= Downtown Tunnel (St. Louis) =

Rail tunnel in St. Louis, Missouri, USA

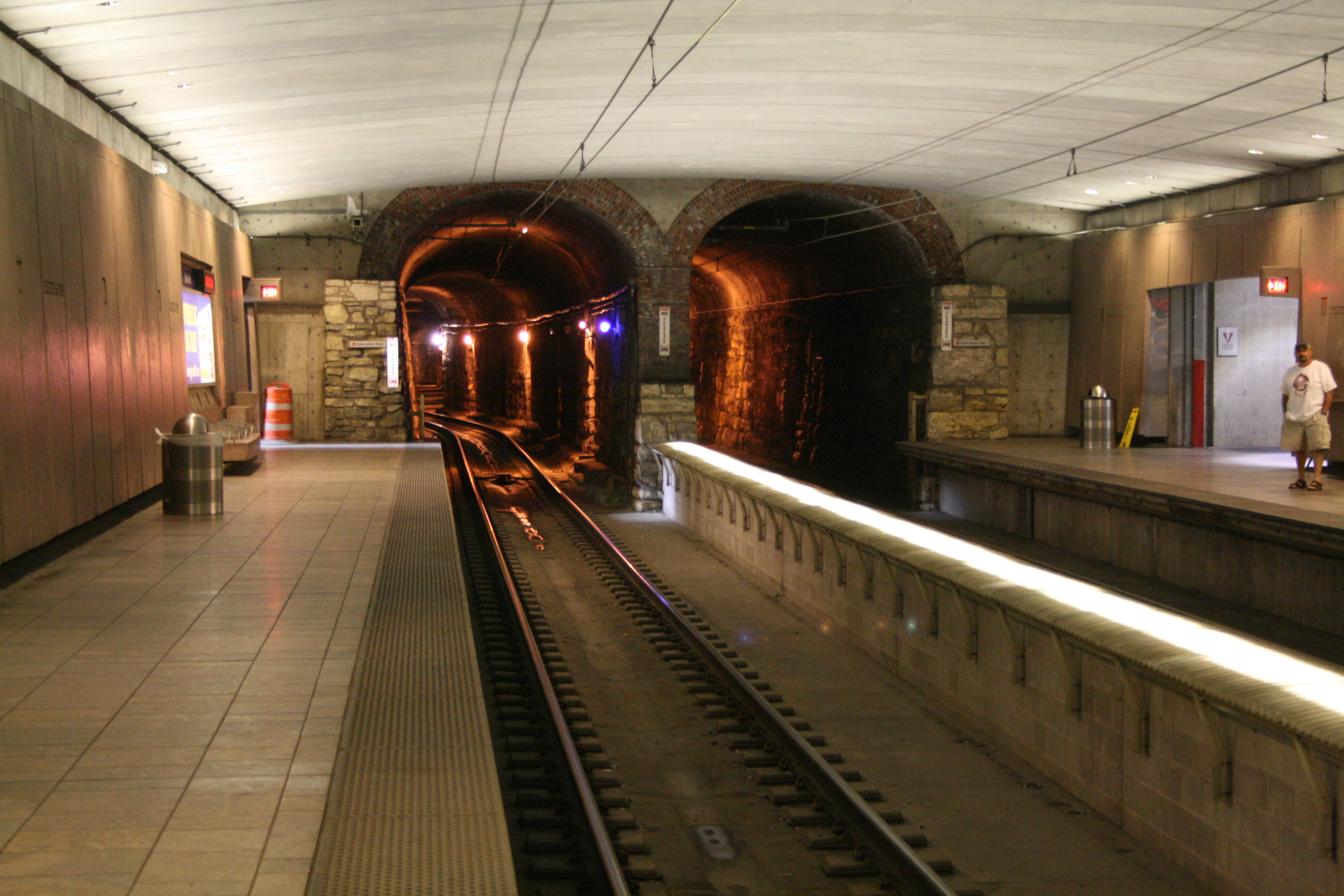
- Platform at 8th & Pine

Overview
- Other name: St. Louis Freight Tunnel
- Status: Operational
- Owner: Bi-State Development Agency
- Locale: St. Louis, Missouri, United States
- Termini: Laclede's Landing; Stadium
- Stations: 4

Service
- Type: Light rail
- System: MetroLink
- Services: Red Blue
- Operator(s): St. Louis Tunnel Railroad Company (1874–1878); St. Louis Bridge Company (1878–1889); Terminal Railroad Association of St. Louis (1889–1974); Metro Transit (1993–present)
- Rolling stock: Siemens SD-400; Siemens SD-460

History
- Opened: 1874
- Closed: 1974
- Reopened: 1993

Technical
- Line length: 0.9 mi (1.4 km)
- Number of tracks: 2
- Character: Underground
- Track gauge: 4 ft 8 1/2 in (1,435 mm) standard gauge
- Electrification: Overhead line, 750 V DC

The Downtown Tunnel, sometimes referred to as the St. Louis Freight Tunnel, is a historic railroad tunnel beneath Washington Avenue and Eighth Street in downtown St. Louis. Completed in 1874, it carried freight and passenger trains between the Eads Bridge and the rail yards in the Mill Creek Valley, bypassing busy downtown streets. It closed in 1974 and sat dormant for nearly two decades before its rehabilitation in 1993 for use by MetroLink, the light rail system in Greater St. Louis.

== History ==
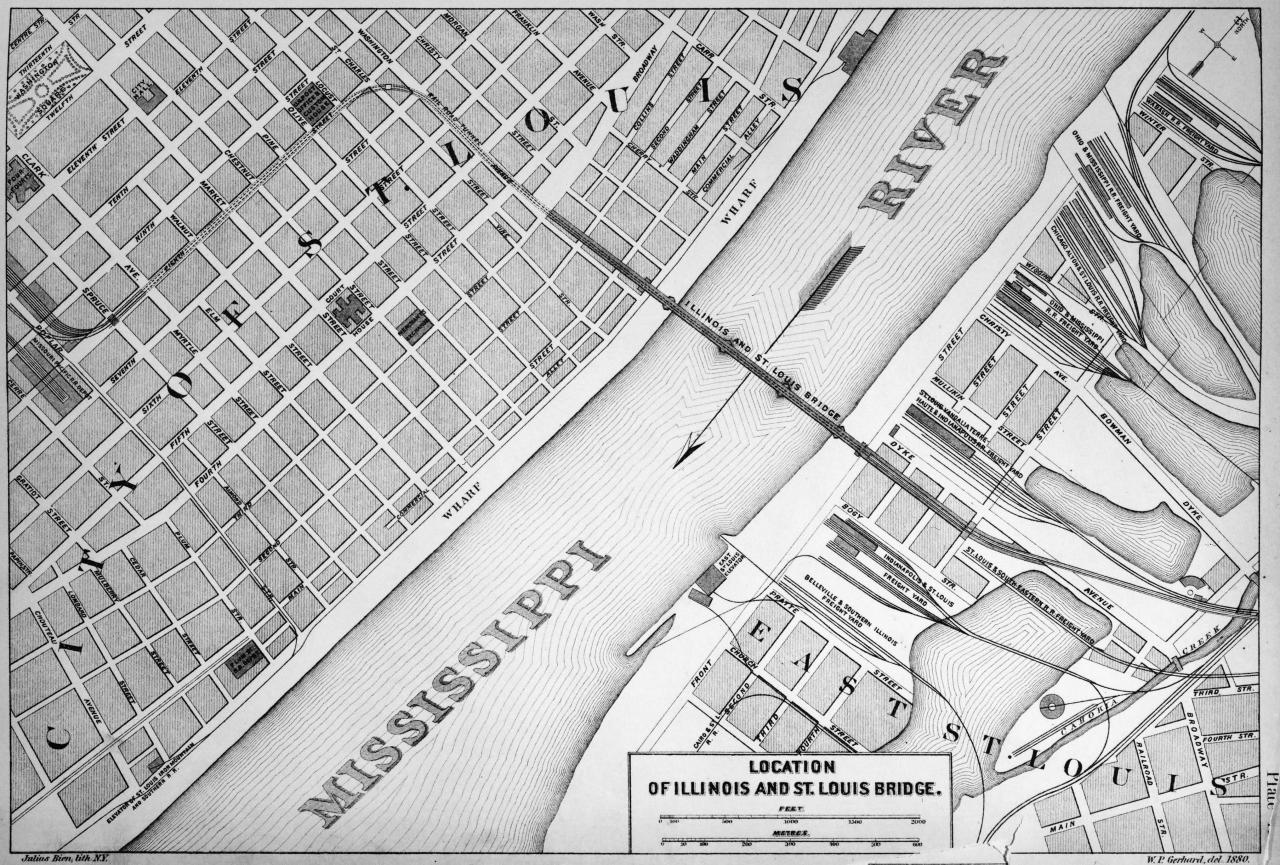
An 1880 map of the route between the Eads Bridge and Mill Creek Valley

City leaders had wanted a wagon bridge to the heart of the city to highlight downtown St. Louis. However, economics required that it be a railroad bridge, but there was no space for railroads on downtown streets. Therefore, a tunnel was authorized to connect the Eads Bridge to the Missouri Pacific Railroad to the south (and later to Union Station).

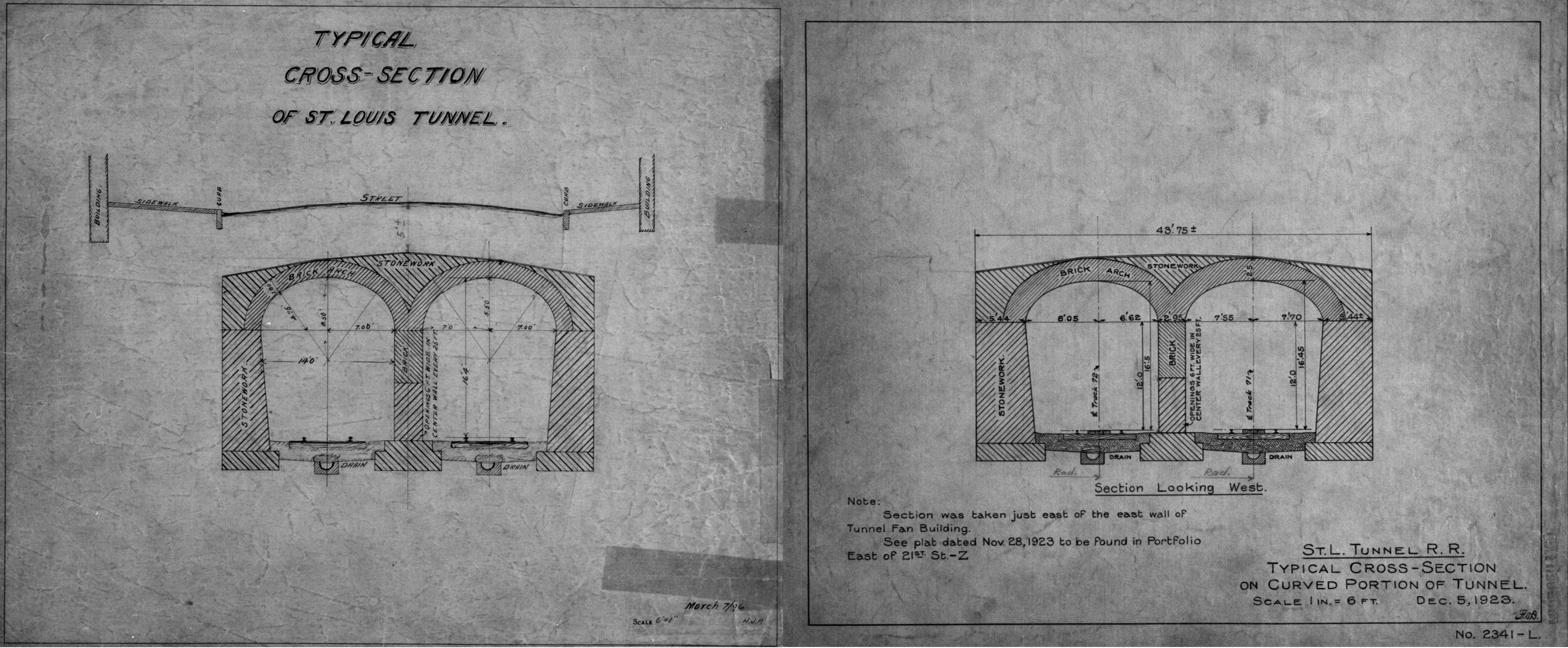
Cross section drawings

The designer of the Eads Bridge, James B. Eads, worked out the specifications for the tunnel. It would be a cut-and-cover tunnel 4,460 feet (1,360 m) long and 30 feet (9.1 m) below street level. Several problems arose during construction of the bridge and tunnel including design changes, inflated land and labor costs, and renegotiated contracts that escalated construction costs 46% over initial estimates. The tunnel structure was completed by June 24, 1874, and the bridge would open less than a month later on July 4.

When it first opened, the tunnel had few users and had already been spun off as the St. Louis Tunnel Railroad Company led by William Taussig. In 1875, Taussig would supervise the opening of the first Union Depot on Poplar Street, between 11th and 12th streets near the mouth of the tunnel. At that time, many railroads did not have licenses to operate in Missouri and the company eventually defaulted on its debts and a federal court appointed J.P. Morgan and Solon Humphreys as receivers. In 1878, the newly formed St. Louis Bridge Company purchased the bridge and tunnel out of bankruptcy for $2 million, a third of its original cost, then transferred it in 1880 to interests controlled by Jay Gould.

Ventilation shaft

By 1882, roughly 272 trains were using the tunnel per day. These trains were steam engines burning a soft, sulphureous bituminous coal that "choked" the tunnel with smoke. Coke burning engines were tried, but offered no improvement. Originally the tunnel was built with four ventilation shafts but these proved insufficient for the volume of traffic. In response, general manager Taussig directed engineer C. Shaler Smith to try mechanical ventilation. The result was a circular ventilation shaft 37 feet in diameter at the base, 15 feet at the top, and 130 feet tall. The fan was 15 feet in diameter and 9 feet wide powered by a 192 horsepower engine. Once complete the fan operated 24/7 and the four older ventilation shafts were permanently closed. The engineers that operated it lived in a building erected around the ventilation shaft. The structure was built above the tunnel near St. Charles Street and has since been demolished.

In 1889, Jay Gould was instrumental in the creation of the Terminal Railroad Association of St. Louis (TRRA), who took ownership of the bridge and tunnel. Gould died in 1892, but his involvement in the TRRA led to the construction of Union Station in 1894. Due to the increasing dimensions of railroad cars, the tunnel saw its last train; an Amtrak passenger train in 1974. Freight and passenger traffic then switched to the MacArthur and Merchants bridges.

=== MetroLink ===
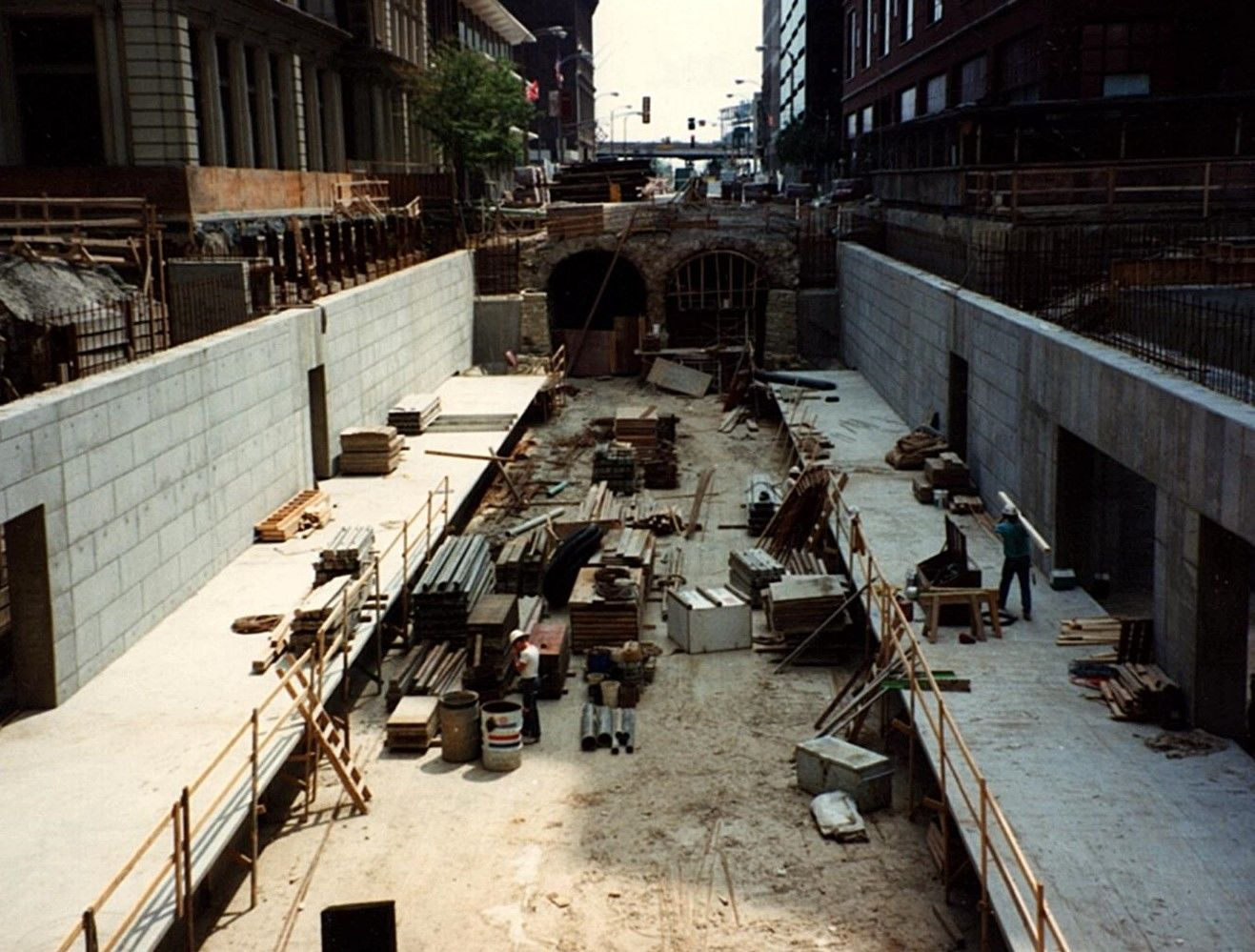
Convention Center station construction along the Washington Avenue alignment of the tunnel

In 1971, regional transit planners identified the Airport/Central Corridor alignment as the region's primary target for further study. In the 1987 draft environmental impact statement, light rail was selected as the region's preferred mode alternative. In 1989, after it was determined the downtown portion would use the Eads Bridge and existing tunnel for light rail, the city of St. Louis swapped the MacArthur Bridge for the Eads Bridge with the Terminal Railroad Association. In 1991, rehabilitation began on the subway tunnel for MetroLink with it reopening in 1993. In July 1992, just east of the present day Convention Center station, a 175-foot section of the tunnel beneath Broadway and Washington Avenue collapsed, injuring no one.

In 2023, Metro Transit began a system-wide rehabilitation program that will last up to three years. That spring, Metro began rehabilitating the Downtown Tunnel, including three of its stations: 8th & Pine, Convention Center, and Laclede's Landing.

=== Architecture ===
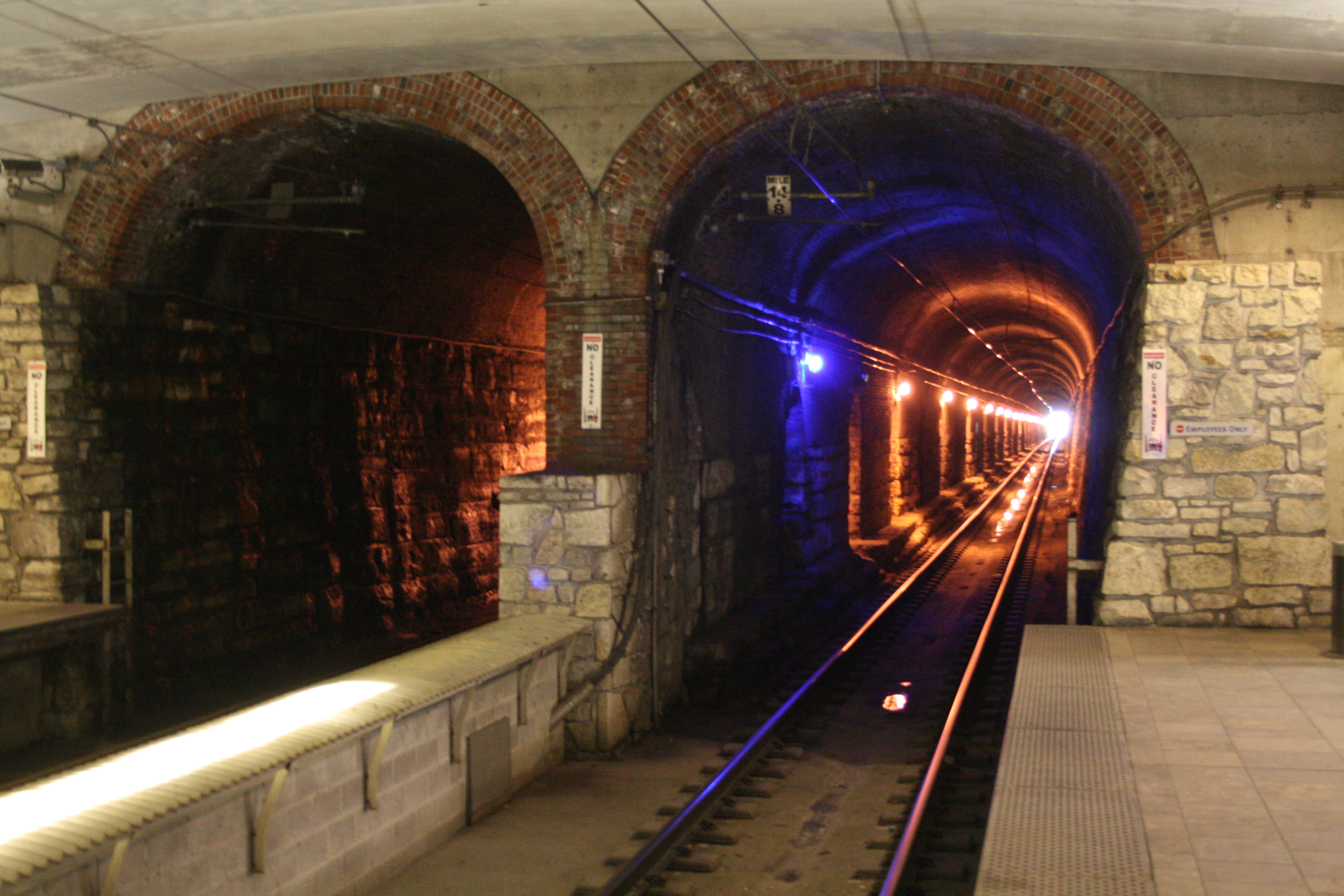
A closeup of the brick barrel vaults at the 8th & Pine station

The tunnel is notable for its brick and stone construction. Its foundations are made up primarily of Aux Vases sandstone while the upper portion of the tunnel is constructed of brick barrel vaults. In the subway stations that were cut into the tunnel, the ends of the platforms are met with brick archways that complement the arch motif used throughout the MetroLink system.

== Station listing ==
Station	Location	Type	Points of interest
Laclede's Landing	200 Washington Avenue	Elevated	Gateway Arch National Park, Horseshoe St. Louis, Laclede's Landing
Convention Center	600 North 6th Street	Underground	600 Washington, America's Center, The Dome at America's Center, Federal Reserve Bank of St. Louis, MX District, National Blues Museum, Washington Avenue Loft District
8th & Pine	323 North 8th Street	Underground	Citygarden, Gateway Mall, Kiener Plaza, Old Post Office Plaza, United States Customhouse and Post Office
Stadium	400 South 8th Street	Below-grade	Ballpark Village, Busch Stadium, Cupples Station, Thomas F. Eagleton Federal Courthouse
