= GalaxyCon =

American conventions company

GalaxyCon, LLC
- Type: Private
- Genre: Comic book; anime; science fiction; fantasy
- Founded: 2006; 20 years ago
- Founder: Mike S. Broder
- Headquarters: Fort Lauderdale, Florida, U.S.
- Area served: United States
- Website: galaxycon.com

GalaxyCon, LLC, formerly known as Super Conventions or Supercon, is a privately owned company based in Fort Lauderdale, Florida, that organizes comic book and anime conventions in the United States. Events currently include: GalaxyCon Raleigh in Raleigh, North Carolina; Animate! Raleigh; GalaxyCon Richmond in Richmond, Virginia; GalaxyCon Columbus in Columbus, Ohio; GalaxyCon Austin in Austin, Texas; and GalaxyCon San Jose in San Jose, California.

In early 2019, the original Supercon trademark, along with the original Florida Supercon events, were sold to ReedPop, at which time all other "Supercon" events were renamed GalaxyCon.

== History ==
In late 2006, Mike Broder sought to bring a large convention to south Florida. He mounted Florida Supercon at the Ramada Hollywood Beach Resort in Hollywood, Florida. He organized Anime Supercon in Fort Lauderdale five months later. Both drew an estimated 2,000 people. Other conventions were organized in the Fort Lauderdale and Miami metro areas. A November 2008 Supercon in Atlanta, Georgia, was not as prosperous as the Florida events.

After the unrelated Wizard World Raleigh Comic Con moved from Raleigh, North Carolina, to Winston-Salem in 2016, the company mounted Raleigh Supercon in July 2017. It drew an estimated 30,000 people for the weekend.

Super Conventions later acquired the former Derby City Comic Con in Louisville, Kentucky, which was re-branded as Louisville Supercon for the November 2018 event.

Two conventions, Animate! Florida (formerly known as Animate! Miami) and Paradise City Comic Con (formerly known as Magic City Comic Con), were discontinued in 2018 so Super Conventions could concentrate on their three Supercon events. Both of those had taken place in Miami.

In 2025, the organizers of the Columbus convention were criticized for overcrowding, poor treatment of disabled people, and poor handling of medical and accessibility devices. The organizers blamed the security company, Allied Universal that was hired through the convention center.

=== Sale of Florida Supercon and convention name changes ===
On March 11, 2019, it was announced that Broder sold Florida Supercon and the "Supercon" trademark to ReedPop of Norwalk, Connecticut. The company owns a number of conventions around the world, including New York Comic Con and MCM London Comic Con. Management for the events in Raleigh and Louisville will remain the same under Broder, but are renamed as GalaxyCon. Also added are GalaxyCon events in Richmond, Virginia, and Minneapolis, Minnesota. Florida Supercon, now managed by ReedPop, will continue to have its annual event in early July.

== List of current GalaxyCon events ==
Name	Location	Venue	Most recent event	Next event	Year first started
Animate! Columbus	Columbus, Ohio	Greater Columbus Convention Center	June 13–15, 2025	June 12–14, 2026	2023
Animate! Orlando	Orlando, Florida	Orange County Convention Center	August 8–10, 2025	August 14–16, 2026	2025
Animate! Philadelphia	Oaks, Pennsylvania	Greater Philadelphia Expo Center	October 3–5, 2025	May 1–3, 2026	2025
Animate! Raleigh	Raleigh, North Carolina	Raleigh Convention Center	January 3–5, 2025	January 9–11, 2026	2024
GalaxyCon Columbus	Columbus, Ohio	Greater Columbus Convention Center	December 5–7, 2025	December 4–6, 2026	2022
GalaxyCon Des Moines	Des Moines, Iowa	Iowa Events Center	September 12–14, 2025	September 11–13, 2026	2023
GalaxyCon Milwaukee	Milwaukee, Wisconsin	Baird Center	—N/a	October 30–November 1, 2026	2026
GalaxyCon Nashville	Nashville, Tennessee	Nashville Fairgrounds	May 29-31, 2026	N/A	2026
GalaxyCon New Orleans	New Orleans, Louisiana	Ernest N. Morial Convention Center	July 11–13, 2025	July 10–12, 2026	2025
GalaxyCon Oklahoma City	Oklahoma City, Oklahoma	Oklahoma City Convention Center	May 23–25, 2025	May 22–24, 2026	2024
GalaxyCon Raleigh	Raleigh, North Carolina	Raleigh Convention Center	July 24–27, 2025	July 23–26, 2026	2017
GalaxyCon Richmond	Richmond, Virginia	Greater Richmond Convention Center	March 27–30, 2025	March 19–22, 2026	2019
GalaxyCon San Jose	San Jose, California	San Jose McEnery Convention Center	August 15–17, 2025	August 21–23, 2026	2024
GalaxyCon St. Louis	St. Louis, Missouri	America's Center	October 10–12, 2025	October 23–25, 2026	2025
Superstar Comic Con Savannah	Savannah, Georgia	Savannah Convention Center	November 14–16, 2025	November 20–22, 2026	2025

As a result of the COVID-19 pandemic, GalaxyCon Raleigh was rescheduled for July 29 – August 1, 2021. In April 2020, the convention announced that, due to economic conditions and issues with the venue, GalaxyCon would not be returning to Louisville for 2020.

=== Former GalaxyCon events ===
Name	Location	Venue	Last event	Year first started
Animate! Miami	Miami, Florida	Miami Airport Convention Center	February 14–16, 2025	2013
GalaxyCon Louisville	Louisville, Kentucky	Kentucky International Convention Center	November 22–24, 2019	2018
GalaxyCon Minneapolis	Minneapolis, Minnesota	Minneapolis Convention Center	November 8–10, 2019	2019
Nightmare Weekend Chicago	Rosemont, Illinois	Donald E. Stephens Convention Center	May 2–4, 2025	2025
Nightmare Weekend Des Moines	Des Moines, Iowa	Iowa Events Center	September 27–29, 2024	2024
Nightmare Weekend Miami	Miami, Florida	Miami Airport Convention Center	October 18–20, 2024	2024
Nightmare Weekend Richmond	Richmond, Virginia	Greater Richmond Convention Center	October 17–19, 2025	2023

== See also ==
- Florida Supercon
