= Animate! Raleigh =

Anime convention held in Raleigh, North Carolina

Coordinates: 35°46′25″N 78°38′28″W

- Status: Active
- Genre: Anime
- Venue: Raleigh Convention Center
- Location: Raleigh, North Carolina
- Country: United States
- Inaugurated: 2024
- Organizer: GalaxyCon
- Website: https://galaxycon.com/pages/animate-raleigh

Animate! Raleigh is an annual three-day anime convention held during October at the Raleigh Convention Center in Raleigh, North Carolina. The convention is organized by GalaxyCon.

== Programming ==
The convention typically offers autographs, cosplay wrestling, costume contests, panels, tabletop gaming, video gaming, and vendors.

== History ==
Animate! Raleigh held its first event in 2024 and will be located in Raleigh through 2030. The 2026 event was postponed from January to March due to a roof fire at the Raleigh Convention Center in December 2025. Animate used two-thirds of the convention centers space and shared the venue with the SAVMA Symposium, while having main events in the Raleigh Marriott City Center's ballroom. Starting in 2027, the convention is moving to October.

=== Event history ===
Dates	Location	Atten.	Guests
January 5-7, 2024	Raleigh Convention Center; Raleigh, North Carolina	12,000 (est.)	AllieCat, Peter Behn, Dawn M. Bennett, Peter Blomquist, Johnny Yong Bosch, Ray Chase, Roger Clark, Lisa Corrao, Robbie Daymond, Jason Douglas, Brian Drummond, Donnie Dunagan, Barbara Dunkelman, Kara Eberle, David Errigo Jr., Guy Hutchinson, Nadji Jeter, Lindsay Jones, Margaret Kerry, Morgan Le Foy, Maki Roll, Jamie Marchi, Vincent Martella, Adam McArthur, Carey Means, Max Mittelman, Noise Complaint, Paige O'Hara, Michelle Ruff, Jad Saxton, Dana Snyder, Kaiji Tang, Alexis Tipton, Eric Vale, Chris "mc chris" Ward, David Willis, Anne Yatco, Stephanie Young, and Arryn Zech.
January 3-5, 2025	Raleigh Convention Center; Raleigh, North Carolina		501st Legion, Greg Baldwin, Tia Ballard, Jeff Brennan, Colleen Clinkenbeard, Amber Lee Connors, Justin Cook, Lisa Corrao, Robbie Daymond, Grey DeLisle Griffin, John DiMaggio, GiveWave Studios, Kimiko Glenn, Matt Hardy, Erika Henningsen, Richard Horvitz, Guy Hutchinson, Cee Kaye, Phil LaMarr, Erica Lindbeck, Brandon McInnis, Max Mittelman, Sarah Natochenny, Nerds Know, Noise Complaint, Joel Perez, Bryce Pinkham, Blake Roman, Silwen Cosplay, Roger Craig Smith, Dana Snyder, Amir Talai, J. Michael Tatum, Lauren Tom, Joe Wos, Lilli Cooper, Neil Ellice, Sam Haft, and Daphne Rubin-Vega.
March 13-15, 2026	Raleigh Convention Center; Raleigh, North Carolina	Roughly 10,000	501st Legion, AstraVoid, Awesomus Prime, Don Bluth, Jack DeSena, Brian Donovan, Zach Tyler Eisen, Maile Flanagan, Brittney Karbowski, Lex Lang, Alan Lee, E. Jason Liebrecht, The Mandalorian Mercs, Elizabeth Maxwell, Adam McArthur, Trina Nishimura, Kyle Phillips, Rebel Legion, Brandon Rogers, William Salyers, Sarelcon, Silwen Cosplay, Kaiji Tang, Courtenay Taylor, Janet Varney, Christopher Wehkamp, Joe Wos, Anne Yatco, and Janie Haddad Tompkins.
October 22-24, 2027	Raleigh Convention Center; Raleigh, North Carolina		

== See also ==
- Animazement
- GalaxyCon
