= 8th & Pine station =

Light rail station in St. Louis, Missouri, US

8th & Pine
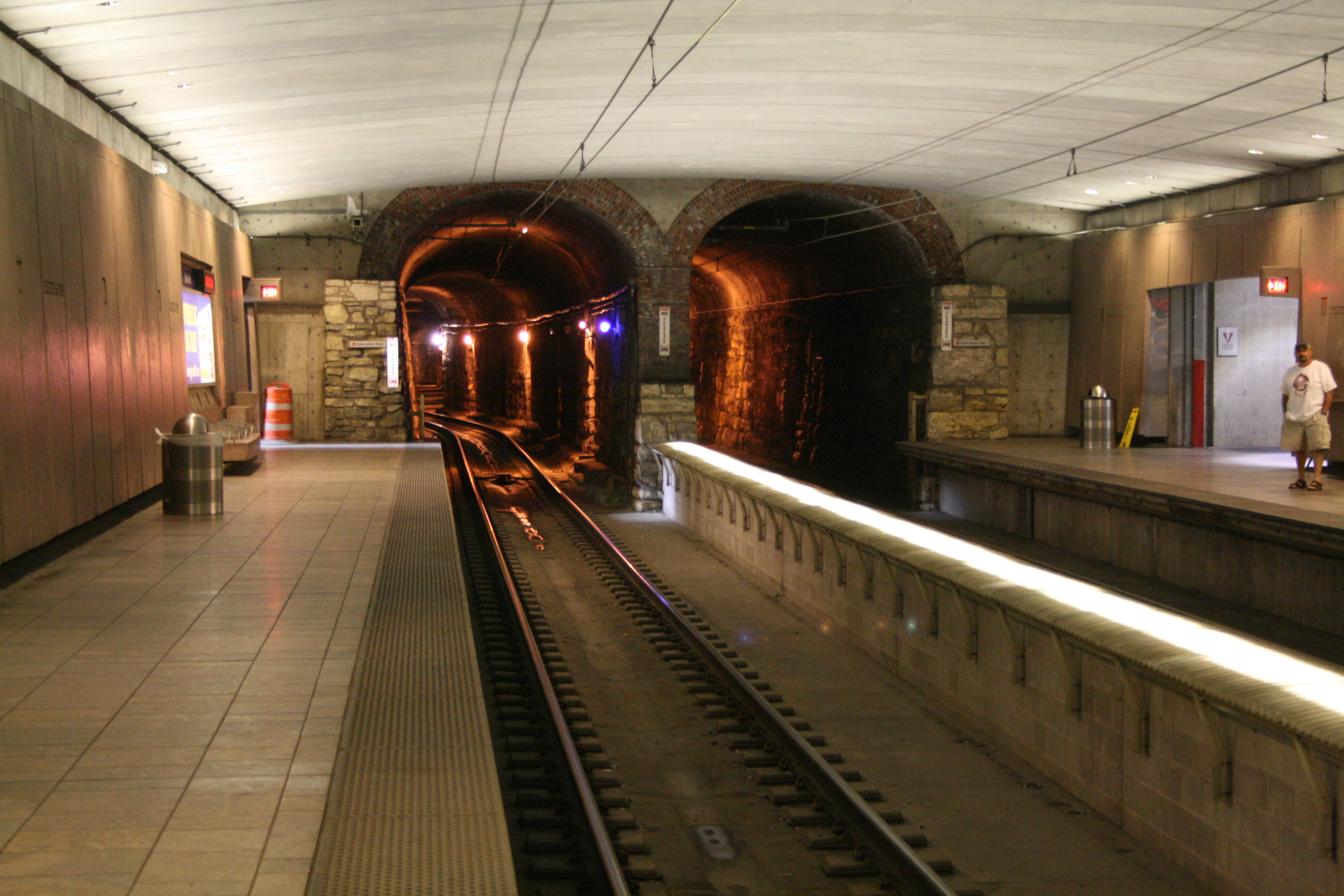
- 8th & Pine station platform

General information
- Location: 323 North 8th Street; St. Louis, Missouri
- Coordinates: 38.62805°N 90.19236°W
- Owner: Bi-State Development
- Operator: Metro Transit
- Platforms: 2 side platforms
- Tracks: 2
- Connections: Madison County Transit: 1X, 5, 14X, 16X

Construction
- Structure type: Underground
- Accessible: Yes

History
- Opened: July 31, 1993
- Rebuilt: 2024

Passengers
- 2018: 1,382 daily
- Rank: 10 out of 38

Services
Preceding station	MetroLink	Following station
Stadium toward Shrewsbury–Lansdowne I-44	Blue Line	Convention Center toward Fairview Heights
Stadium toward Lambert Airport Terminal 1	Red Line	Convention Center toward Shiloh–Scott
Location

8th & Pine station is a light rail station on the Red and Blue lines of the St. Louis MetroLink system. This subway station is located beneath the intersection of 8th and Pine streets in St. Louis' Central Business District.

== History ==
8th & Pine was built within the historic Downtown Tunnel, constructed in 1874 to carry trains between the Eads Bridge and the Mill Creek Valley rail yards. The tunnel closed after a final Amtrak train passed through in 1974. Rehabilitation began in 1991 in preparation for the opening of MetroLink in 1993, which now uses the tunnel to connect communities in Illinois and Missouri via downtown St. Louis.

On April 8, 2024, Metro Transit closed the 8th & Pine station for cleaning and rehabilitation. Major projects included removal of aging escalators, construction of new staircases and upgraded lighting and way-finding. Initially, the project was to take three months but construction crews discovered structural issues in the abutment walls during escalator removal leading to delays. During the closure Metro operated a bus shuttle between the 8th & Pine and Civic Center stations. The station re-opened to the public on December 16, 2024.

== Station layout ==
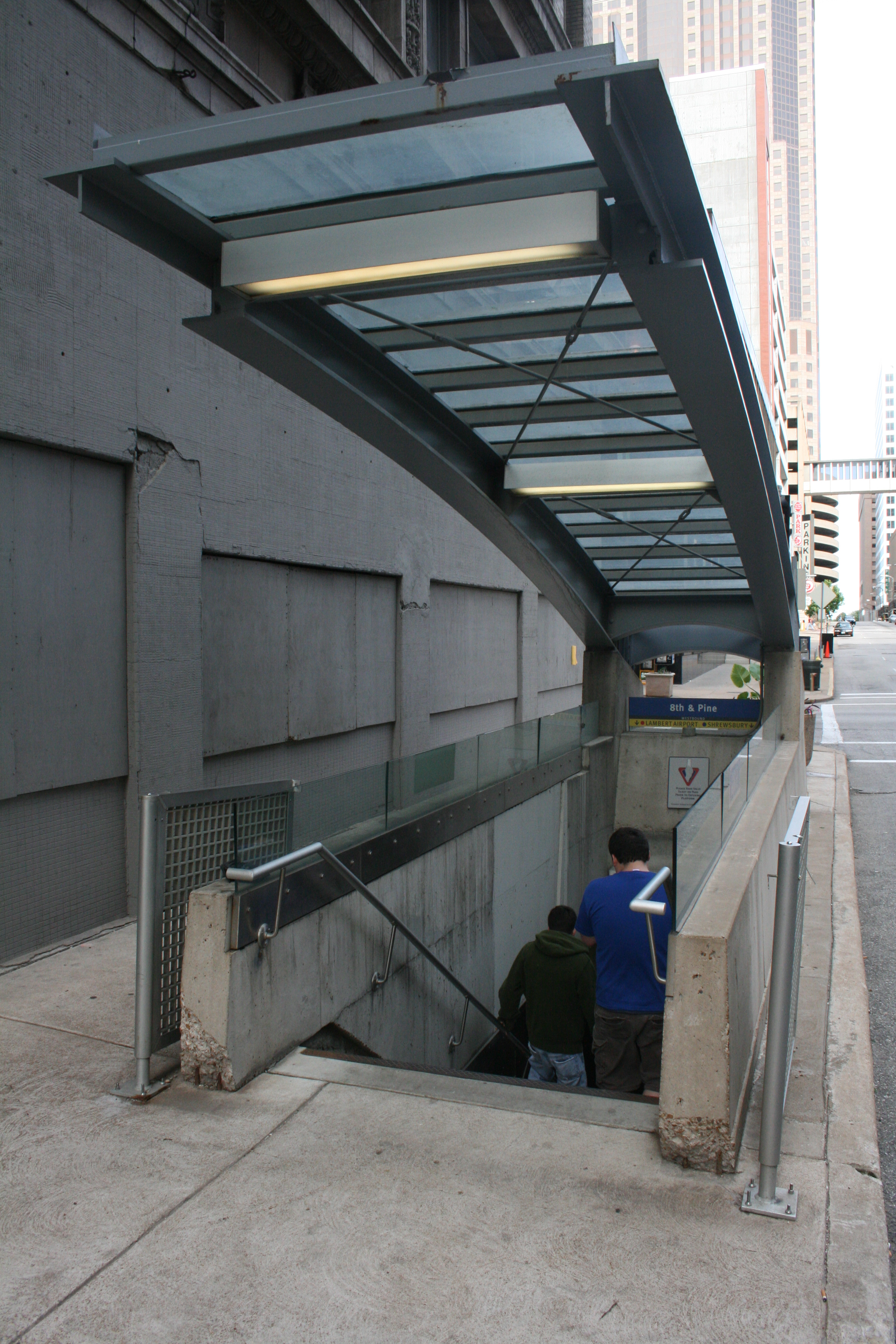
8th & Pine subway stair

The station's westbound platform is accessed via an entrance in the base of the 800 Pine Street building in addition to a set of subway stairs across Pine. The eastbound platform is accessed via an entrance in the base of the Laclede Gas Building and a set of subway stairs on 8th Street near Chestnut Street.

== Notable places nearby ==
Gateway Arch National Park recommends visitors accessing the park via public transportation use this station or the Laclede's Landing station. Other nearby places of note include:

- Citygarden
- Downtown St. Louis
- Gateway Mall
- Kiener Plaza
- Old Courthouse
- United States Customhouse and Post Office
- Wainwright Building
