= Raleigh Downtown Live =

Former American concert series

Raleigh Downtown Live was a free summer concert series held in Raleigh, North Carolina, United States, in Moore Square Park, in the Moore Square Historic District of downtown from 2005 to 2009. It featured many top music artists from around the world, drawing over 70,000 music fans annually. It was a joint partnership between the City of Raleigh Convention Center and Deep South Entertainment of Raleigh, North Carolina. Deep South Entertainment continues to be based in downtown Raleigh, North Carolina, with a second office in Nashville, Tennessee. Deep South Entertainment currently produces the Oak City 7 summer concert series in Downtown Raleigh.

== Lineups ==
Below is a list of previous music artists that have been featured in the Raleigh Downtown Live concert series.

Date	Headliners
2004
October 7, 2004	Vertical Horizon, Drivin N Cryin, Stroke 9
2005
April 30, 2005	Big Bad Voodoo Daddy
June 11, 2005	Better Than Ezra, Dishwalla
July 17, 2005	Violent Femmes, Sponge
August 27, 2005	Naughty By Nature, 7 Mary 3
September 3, 2005	Saturday Night Special Band, Little Texas
2006
May 27, 2006	Lit, Travis Meeks
June 10, 2006	Arrested Development, Cowboy Mouth
June 24, 2006	Big Head Todd and the Monsters, 13 Stories
July 8, 2006	Spin Doctors, Blue October
July 22, 2006	Butch Walker, Dillon Fence
August 5, 2006	Candlebox, Urge Overkill
August 19, 2006	Gin Blossoms, Athanaeum
September 2, 2006	The Presidents of the United States of America, Denny Diamond
2007
June 2, 2007	Everclear, Hobex
June 16, 2007	Unforgettable Fire, Weekend Excursion
June 30, 2007	FireHouse, Nine Days
July 14, 2007	The Romantics, Will Hoge
July 28, 2007	Night Ranger, The Backsliders
August 11, 2007	Soul Asylum, Yo Mama's Big Fat Booty Band
August 25, 2007	Warrant, Parmalee
2008
May 1, 2008	The Wailers, Braco
June 14, 2008	Cravin Melon, Pete Francis of Dispatch
June 28, 2008	Carbon Leaf, Blind Melon
July 12, 2008	Alter Bridge, Tantric
July 26, 2008	The Old 97's, The Connells
August 9, 2008	Brian Howe of Bad Company, Will Hoge, Left Outlet
August 23, 2008	Puddle of Mudd, Saving Abel, Rev Theory
2009
May 30, 2009	Candlebox, Parmalee, Jimmie's Chicken Shack
June 13, 2009	Filter
June 27, 2009	The Tubes, Cracker
July 11, 2009	Joan Jett and The Blackhearts
July 25, 2009	Charlie Daniels Band
August 8, 2009	Tonic, Marcy Playground
August 22, 2009	Better Than Ezra

== 2010 Cancellation ==
Raleigh Downtown Live was cancelled for the summer of 2010, due to the opening of a new amphitheater in downtown Raleigh, North Carolina.
