= Convention Center station (MetroLink) =

Light rail station in St. Louis, Missouri, US

Convention Center
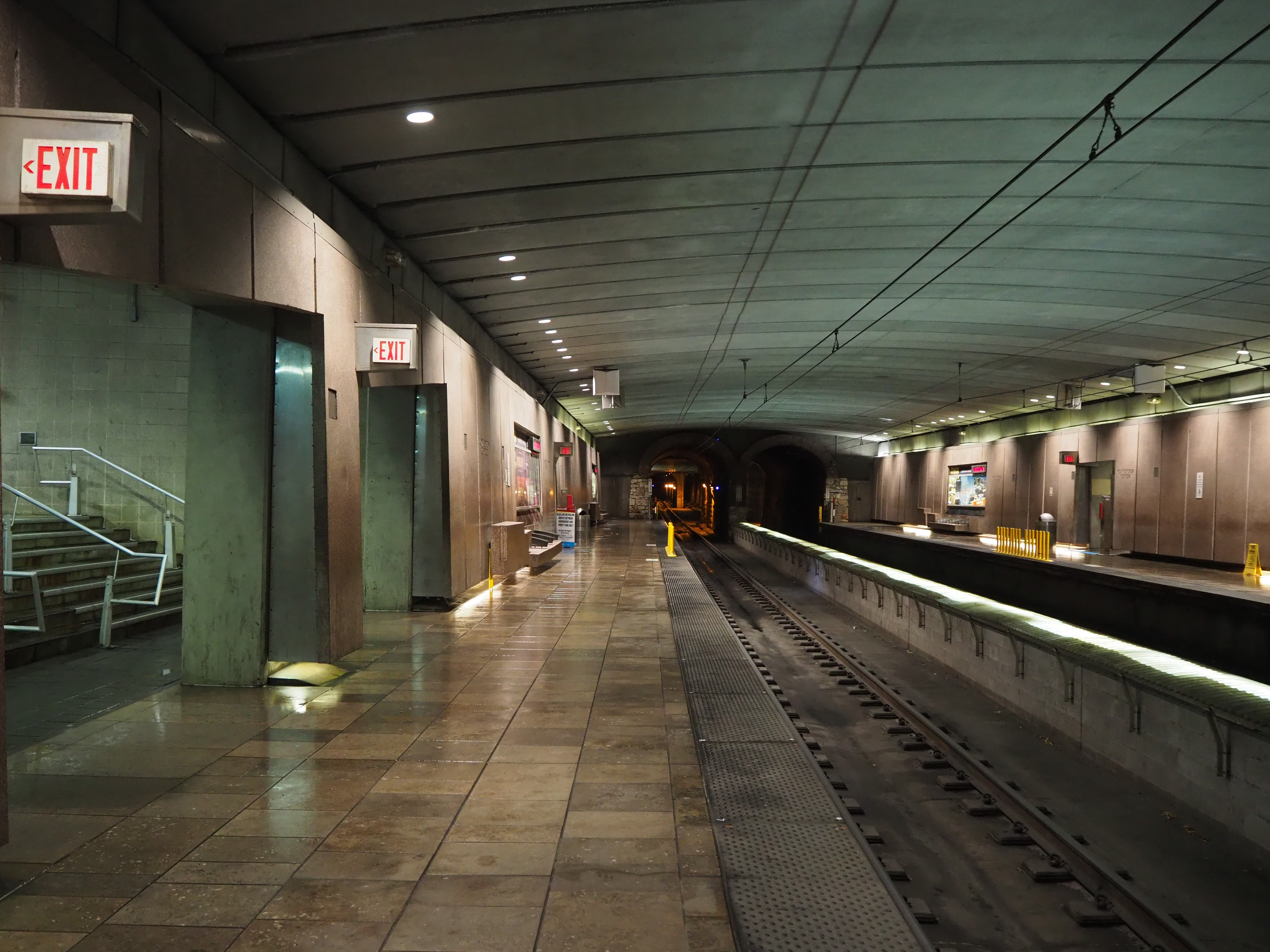
- Convention Center station platform

General information
- Location: 600 North 6th Street; St. Louis, Missouri
- Coordinates: 38.630224°N 90.189362°W
- Owner: Bi-State Development
- Operator: Metro Transit
- Platforms: 2 side platforms
- Tracks: 2
- Connections: Madison County Transit: 1X, 5, 14X, 16X

Construction
- Structure type: Underground
- Accessible: Yes

History
- Opened: July 31, 1993

Passengers
- 2018: 1,309 daily
- Rank: 12 out of 38

Services
Preceding station	MetroLink	Following station
8th & Pine toward Shrewsbury–Lansdowne I-44	Blue Line	Laclede's Landing toward Fairview Heights
8th & Pine toward Lambert Airport Terminal 1	Red Line	Laclede's Landing toward Shiloh–Scott
Location

Convention Center station is a light rail station on the Red and Blue lines of the St. Louis MetroLink system. This subway station is located beneath the intersection of 6th Street and Washington Avenue in St. Louis' Central Business District.

== History ==
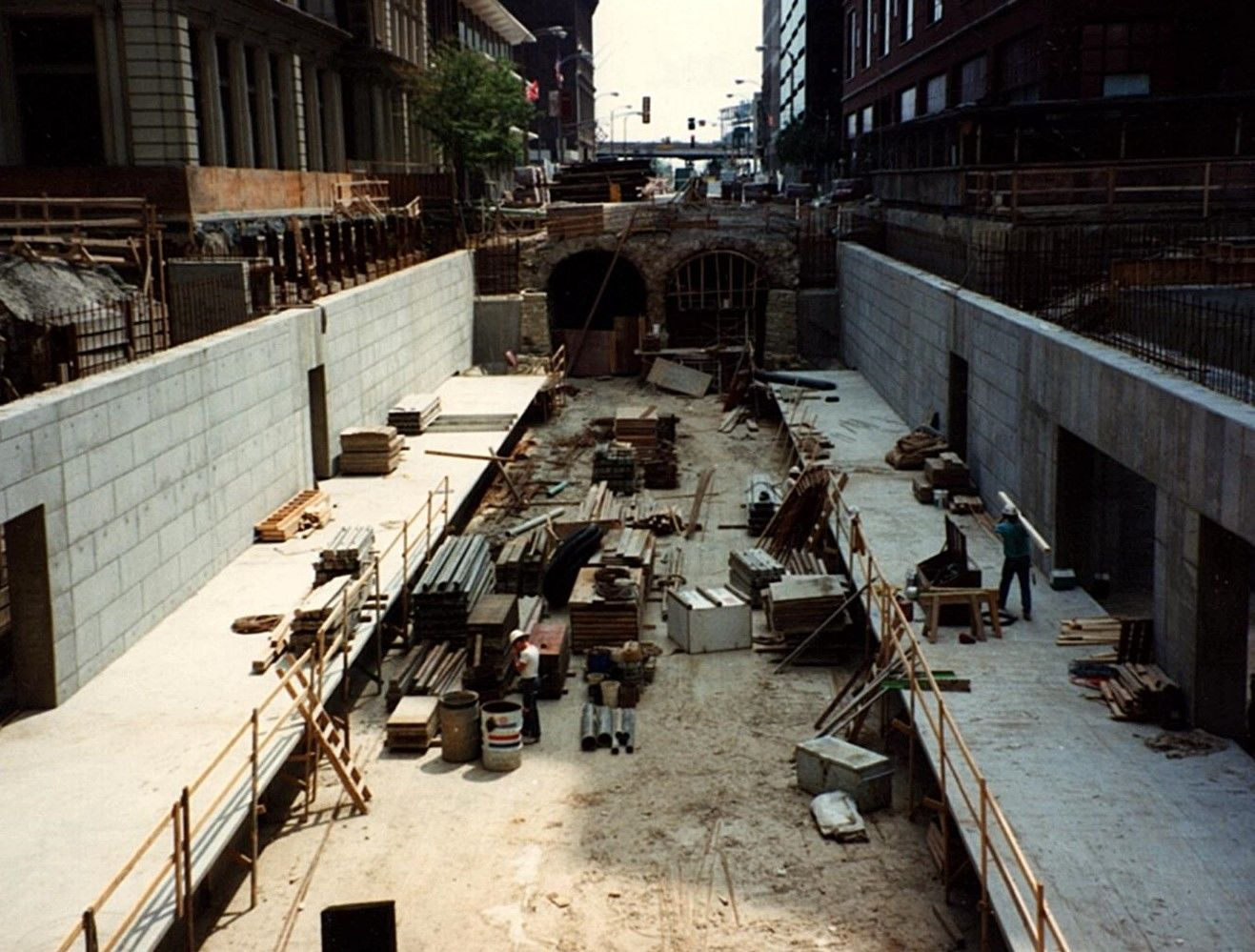
Station construction in 1991

Convention Center was built within the historic Downtown Tunnel, constructed in 1874 to carry trains between the Eads Bridge and the Mill Creek Valley rail yards. The tunnel closed after a final Amtrak train passed through in 1974. Rehabilitation began in 1991 in preparation for the opening of MetroLink in 1993, which now uses the tunnel to connect communities in Illinois and Missouri via downtown St. Louis. In July 1992, just east of this station, a 175-foot section of the tunnel beneath Broadway and Washington Avenue collapsed, injuring no one.

On January 20, 2023, Metro Transit announced that Convention Center will receive a cleaning and rehabilitation. Major projects include removal of aging escalators, construction of new staircases and upgraded lighting and way-finding. Work began shortly after the completion of the 8th & Pine station rehabilitation, with the station closing to the public on January 6, 2025. The station reopened to the public on June 2, 2025.

== Station layout ==
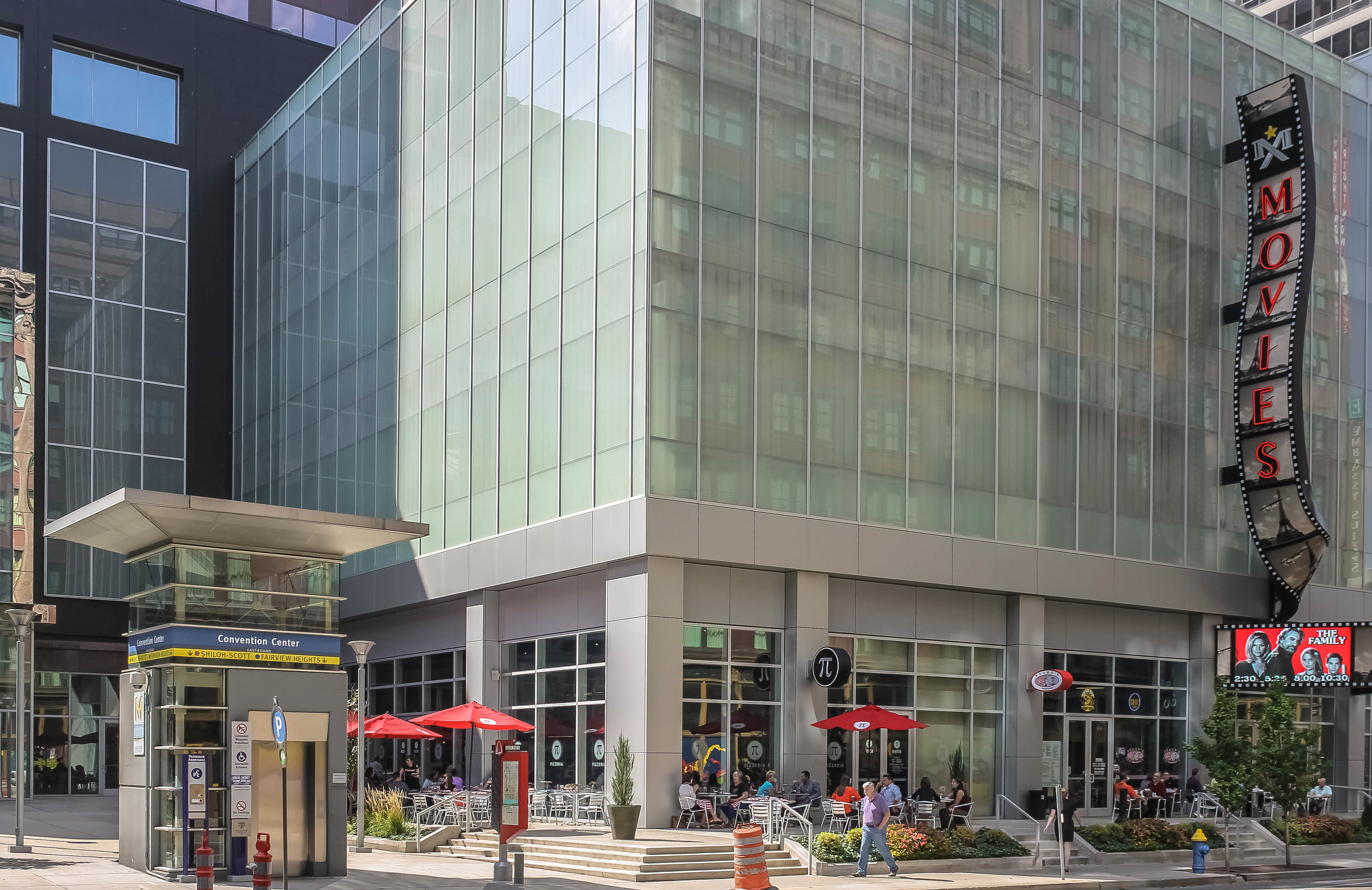
Eastbound elevator access in 2016

The station's westbound platform is accessed via an entrance in the base of the former Stix, Baer, and Fuller flagship department store building, now known as The Laurel. The westbound side can also be accessed via a set of subway stairs on the northeast corner of 6th Street and Washington Avenue. The eastbound platform is accessed via a set of subway stairs, an escalator, and an elevator in the public plaza of 600 Washington in addition to another set of subway stairs across 6th Street.

== Public artwork ==
In 1997, Metro's Arts in Transit program commissioned the work Birds in Flight by artists Peter Tao, Helen Lee, and Stuart and Stacey Morse for installation in the tunnel between the Convention Center and Laclede's Landing stations. The painted panels are meant to mimic the motion of a flying bird.

== Notable places nearby ==
- America's Center
- The Dome at America's Center
- Downtown St. Louis
- Marriott St. Louis Grand Hotel
- Missouri Athletic Club
- National Blues Museum
- Washington Avenue Historic District
