= Civic Center station (MetroLink) =

Light rail station in St. Louis, Missouri, US

Civic Center
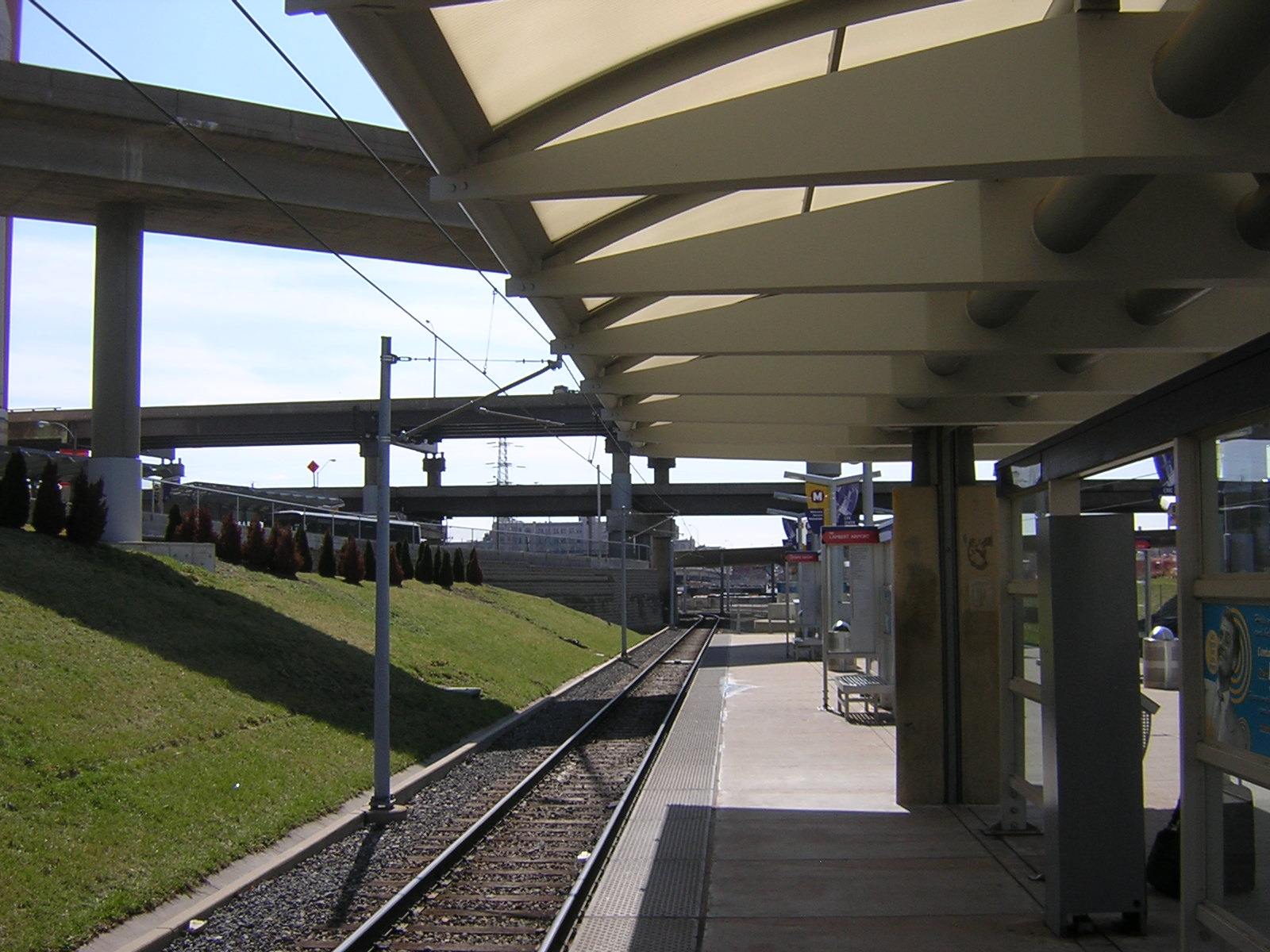
- Civic Center station platform

General information
- Location: 1413 Spruce Street; St. Louis, Missouri
- Coordinates: 38.624925°N 90.203170°W
- Owner: Bi-State Development Agency
- Operator: Metro Transit
- Platforms: 1 island platform
- Tracks: 2
- Bus stands: 17
- Connections: MetroBus Missouri: 04, 10, 11, 19, 30, 31, 32, 40, 41, 73, 74, 94, 97; Madison County Transit: 1X, 5, 14X, 16X; at Gateway Station

Construction
- Structure type: Below-grade
- Cycle facilities: Racks
- Accessible: Yes

History
- Opened: July 31, 1993
- Rebuilt: 2017
- Former names: Kiel / Kiel Civic Center

Passengers
- 2018: 2,217 daily
- Rank: 5 out of 38

Services
Preceding station	MetroLink	Following station
Union Station toward Shrewsbury–Lansdowne I-44	Blue Line	Stadium toward Fairview Heights
Union Station toward Lambert Airport Terminal 1	Red Line	Stadium toward Shiloh–Scott
Location

Civic Center station, originally Kiel station (for the Kiel Center under construction when the station opened), is a light rail station on the Red and Blue lines of the St. Louis MetroLink system. This below-grade station is located near 14th and Spruce streets near Interstate 64. It is the primary transfer station for MetroBus and serves regional bus routes operated by Madison County Transit. Additionally, the station adjoins the Gateway Transportation Center which has intercity services provided by Amtrak, Greyhound, and others.

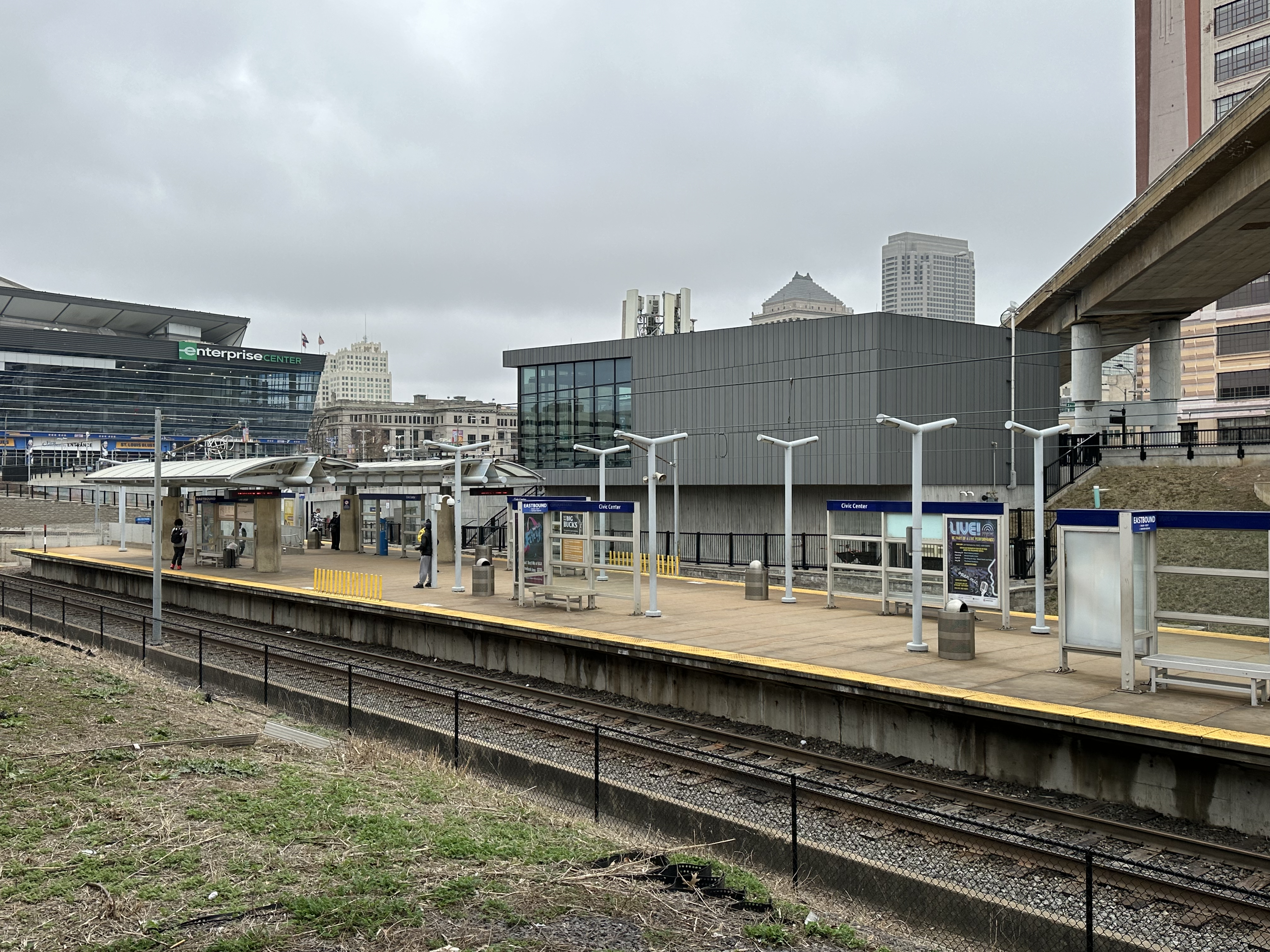
The security center and waiting area built in 2017 seen behind Civic Center in 2024

On August 14, 2017, MetroBus service returned to the station after an extensive renovation of the bus station portion of Civic Center. It included multiple new bus bays, a security center, an indoor waiting area and public restrooms.

== Station layout ==
Civic Center's platform is accessed via stairs and a ramp from the MetroBus transfer and another ramp from the Gateway Transportation Center.

== Bus connections ==
Civic Center is a major MetroBus transfer and also serves several regional Madison County Transit routes at adjacent stops on Spruce Street.

=== MetroBus ===
- 04 Natural Bridge
- 10 Gravois-Lindell
- 11 Chippewa
- 19 St. Louis Avenue
- 30 Arsenal
- 31 Chouteau
- 32 Dr. M.L. King
- 40 Broadway-Halls Ferry
- 41 Lee
- 73 Carondelet
- 74 Florissant
- 94 Page
- 97 Delmar

=== Madison County Transit ===
- 1X Riverbend Express
- 05 Tri-City Regional
- 14X Highland Express
- 16X Edwardsville-Glen Carbon Express

== Public artwork ==
In 2018, Metro's Arts in Transit program commissioned the work Wheels by Claudia Cuesta and Bill Baker for this station. The stainless steel work is a highly visible site marker that integrates the different forms of transportation at this station. Wheels minimal footprint and the inscribed poem from T. S. Eliot invites people to circle the sculpture as they read the poem, creating the fourth wheel.

== Notable places nearby ==
- Campbell House Museum
- Central Library
- Enterprise Center, home of the St. Louis Blues
- Gateway Mall
- Soldiers' Memorial
- Stifel Theatre
- St. Louis City Hall
