= Florida Supercon =

Comic book convention

- Type: Subsidiary
- Genre: comic book, anime, science fiction, fantasy
- Founded: 2006; 20 years ago Fort Lauderdale, Florida, U.S.
- Founder: Mike S. Broder
- Headquarters: Norwalk, Connecticut, U.S.
- Area served: Florida, U.S.
- Parent: ReedPop
- Website: https://www.floridasupercon.com

Florida Supercon is an annual comic book convention held in the Miami and Fort Lauderdale metro areas of Florida. The event takes place in early July. Florida Supercon is a subsidiary of ReedPop, located in Norwalk, Connecticut, acquired in March 2019. It was originally part of Super Conventions, or Supercon, which also had included events now branded as GalaxyCon.

== History ==
Supercon logo from 2012-2018

The first Supercon was organized by founder Mike Broder in late 2006 at the Ramada Hollywood Beach Resort in Hollywood, Florida, called Florida Supercon. He was looking to bring a large scale convention to south Florida. Another event, Anime Supercon, took place in Fort Lauderdale five months later. Estimated attendances at each event averaged around 2,000 people. As success grew, other conventions were added throughout the Fort Lauderdale and Miami metro areas.

An attempt was made in November 2008 to hold a longstanding Supercon outside of Florida, in Atlanta, Georgia, but it was not as prosperous as the Florida events. Another try didn't take place until July 2017 with Raleigh Supercon in Raleigh, North Carolina, replacing the promotional Wizard World Raleigh Comic Con which eventually moved to nearby Winston-Salem after the 2015 event. Raleigh Supercon 2017 drew in an estimated 30,000 people for the weekend. Super Conventions later acquired the former Derby City Comic Con in Louisville, Kentucky, which was re-branded as Louisville Supercon. The inaugural event took place in November 2018.

Two other recent conventions, Animate! Florida (formerly known as Animate! Miami) and Paradise City Comic Con (formerly known as Magic City Comic Con), were discontinued in 2018 so Super Conventions could concentrate on their three Supercon events. Both of those had taken place in Miami.

=== Sale of Florida Supercon and convention name changes ===
On March 11, 2019, it was announced that Broder sold Florida Supercon and the "Supercon" trademark to ReedPop of Norwalk, Connecticut. The company owns a number of conventions around the world, including New York Comic Con and MCM London Comic Con. Management for the events in Raleigh and Louisville would remain the same under Broder, but are renamed as GalaxyCon. Two other events have also been added. Florida Supercon, now managed by ReedPop, will continue to have its annual event in early July.

The 2020 convention was rescheduled and then canceled due to the COVID-19 pandemic.
