= Stadium station (MetroLink) =

Light rail station in St. Louis, Missouri, US

Stadium
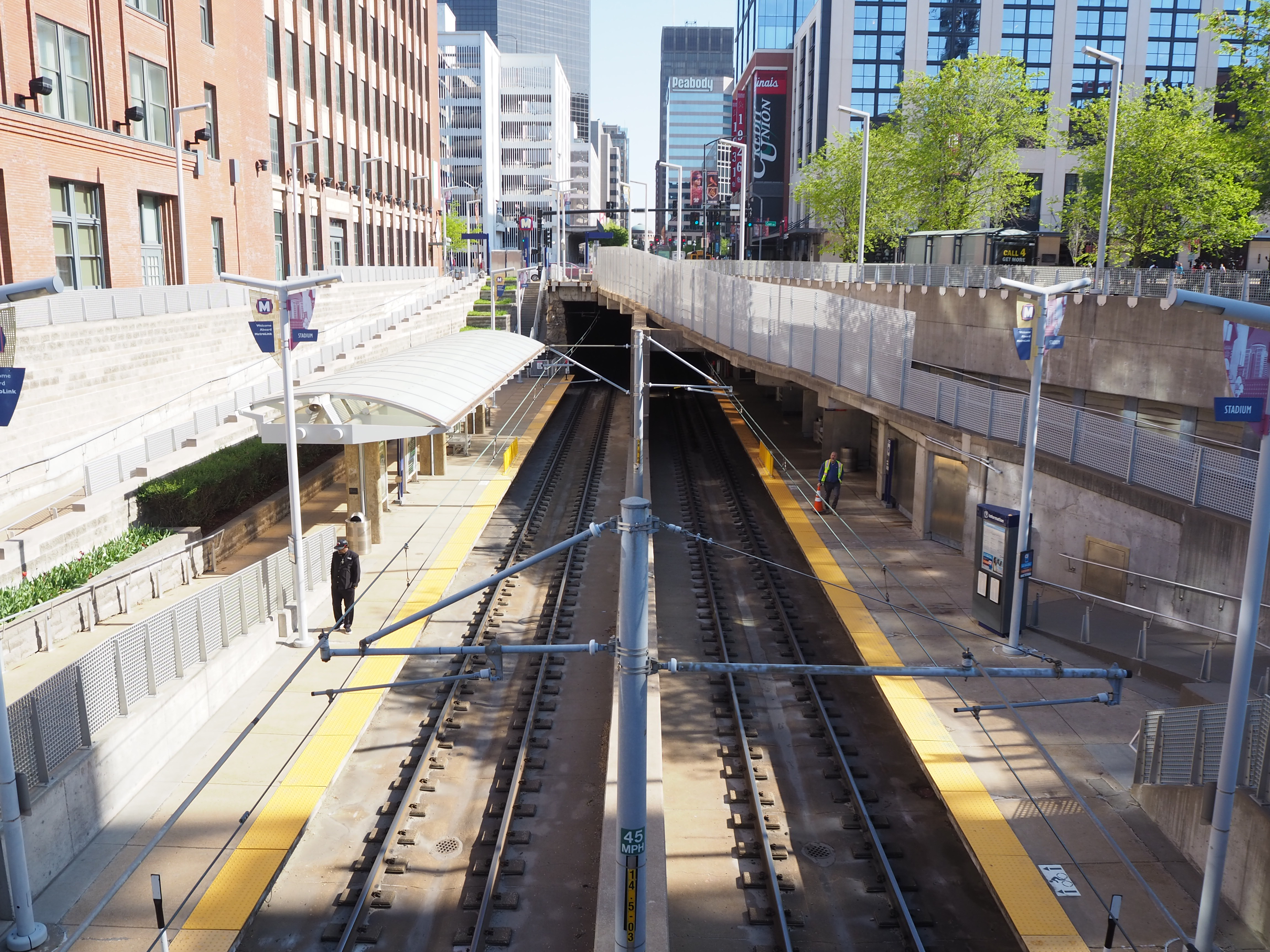
- Stadium station in 2022

General information
- Location: 400 South 8th Street; St. Louis, Missouri
- Coordinates: 38.623475°N 90.194615°W
- Owner: Bi-State Development
- Operator: Metro Transit
- Platforms: 2 side platforms
- Tracks: 2

Construction
- Structure type: Below-grade
- Accessible: Yes

History
- Opened: July 31, 1993
- Former names: Busch Stadium

Passengers
- 2018: 1,180 daily
- Rank: 13 out of 38

Services
Preceding station	MetroLink	Following station
Civic Center toward Shrewsbury–Lansdowne I-44	Blue Line	8th & Pine toward Fairview Heights
Civic Center toward Lambert Airport Terminal 1	Red Line	8th & Pine toward Shiloh–Scott
Location

Stadium station is a light rail station on the Red and Blue lines of the St. Louis MetroLink system. This below-grade station is located alongside 8th Street between Spruce Street and Clark Avenue. The station is named for nearby Busch Stadium.

In September 2025, Metro announced an approximately one month closure of the station for construction related to the Secure Platform Plan. It reopened the following October.

== Station layout ==
Both platforms are connected to Clark Avenue with accessible ramps or stairs. There are also stairs connecting the platforms to Spruce Street.

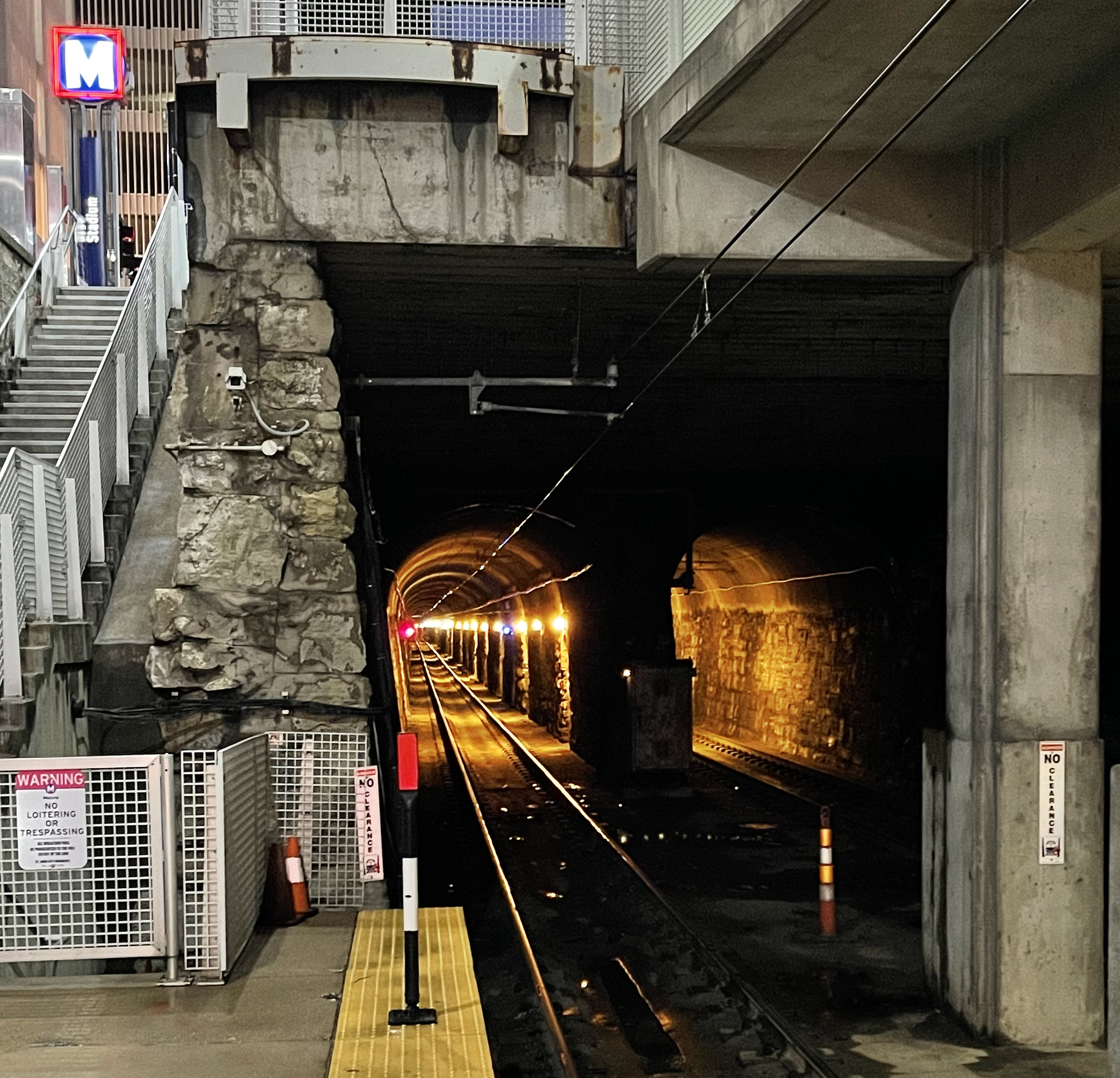
The west portal of the Downtown Tunnel at Stadium

Stadium sits at the west portal of the historic Downtown Tunnel, constructed in 1874 to carry trains between the Eads Bridge and the Mill Creek Valley rail yards. The tunnel closed after a final Amtrak train passed through in 1974. Rehabilitation began in 1991 in preparation for the opening of MetroLink in 1993, which now uses the tunnel to connect communities in Illinois and Missouri via downtown St. Louis.

== Public artwork ==
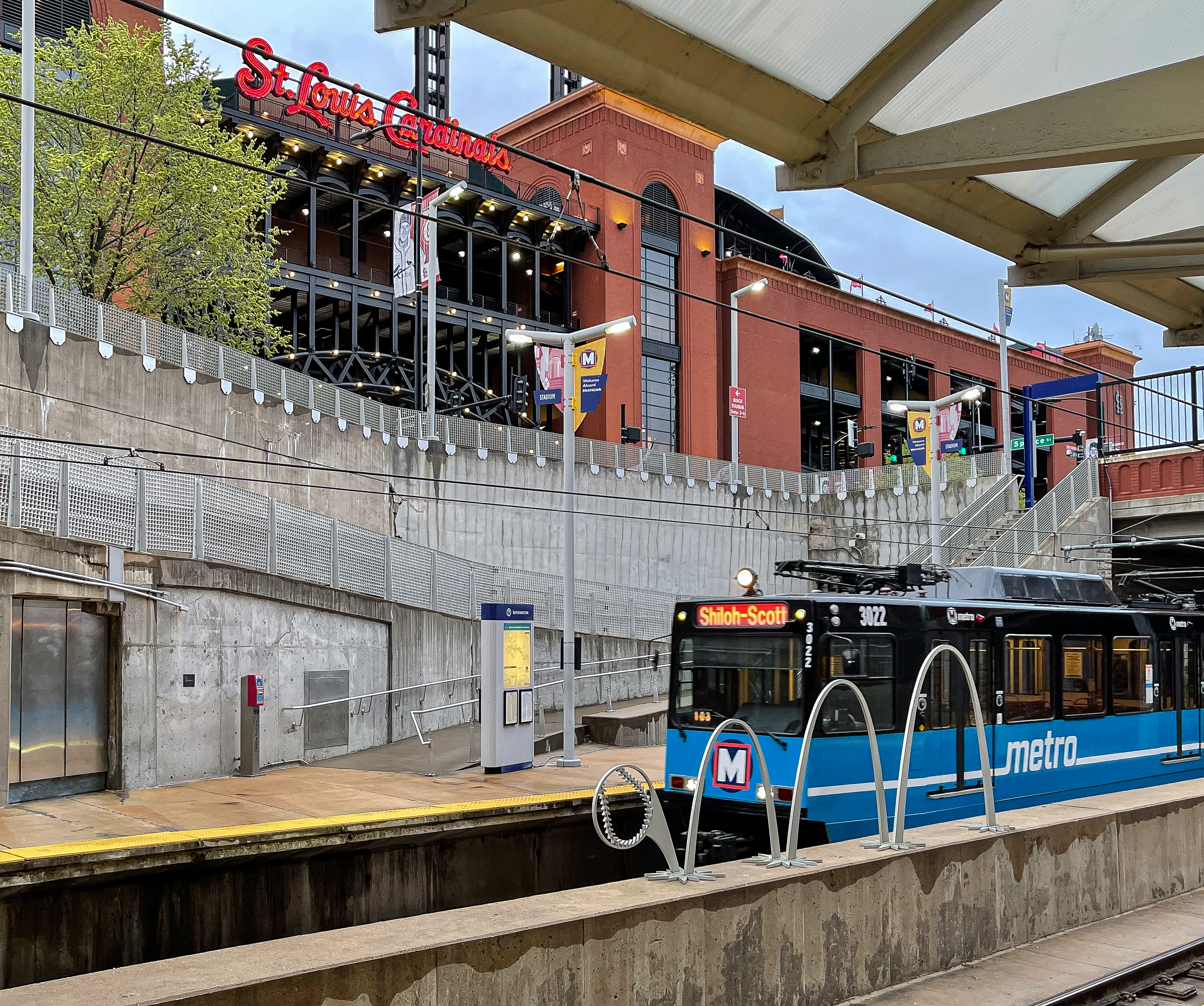
Out of the Park by Andrews/LeFevre Studios

In 2013, Metro's Arts in Transit program commissioned the work Out of the Park by Andrews/LeFevre Studios for this station. The anodized aluminum sculpture is a dynamic abstraction of a baseball being hit “out of the park” and echoes the shape and proportions of the Gateway Arch.

== Notable places nearby ==
- Ballpark Village
- Busch Stadium, home of the St. Louis Cardinals
- Field House Museum
- Thomas F. Eagleton United States Courthouse
