= Kiener Plaza =

Park in St. Louis, Missouri, USA

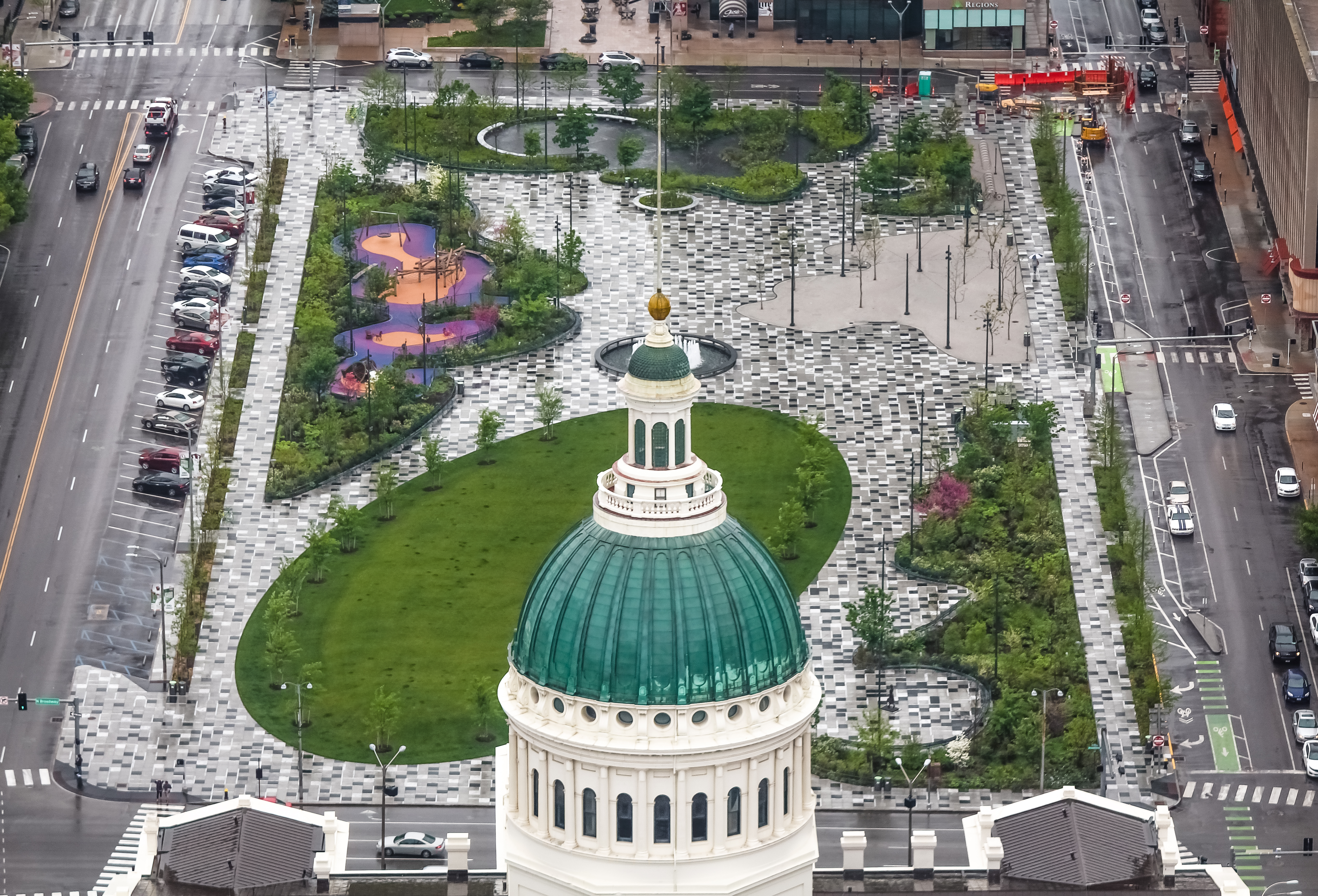
- Kiener Plaza seen from the Arch 2018
- Interactive map of Kiener Plaza
- Type: Urban park
- Location: St. Louis, Missouri
- Coordinates: 38.6261°N 90.1911°W
- Area: 1.9 acres (0.77 ha)
- Opened: 1965 (East Kiener Plaza); 1986 (West Kiener Plaza)
- Designer: Michael Van Valkenburgh Associates, Inc.
- Manager: City of St. Louis
- Parking: Street parking
- Public transit: MetroBus; Red Blue; At 8th & Pine station
- Website: Kiener Plaza

Kiener Plaza is a public park in downtown St. Louis, Missouri. The park is part of the Gateway Mall and is bounded by Chestnut and Market streets on the north and south and Broadway and 7th Street on the east and west.

== History ==
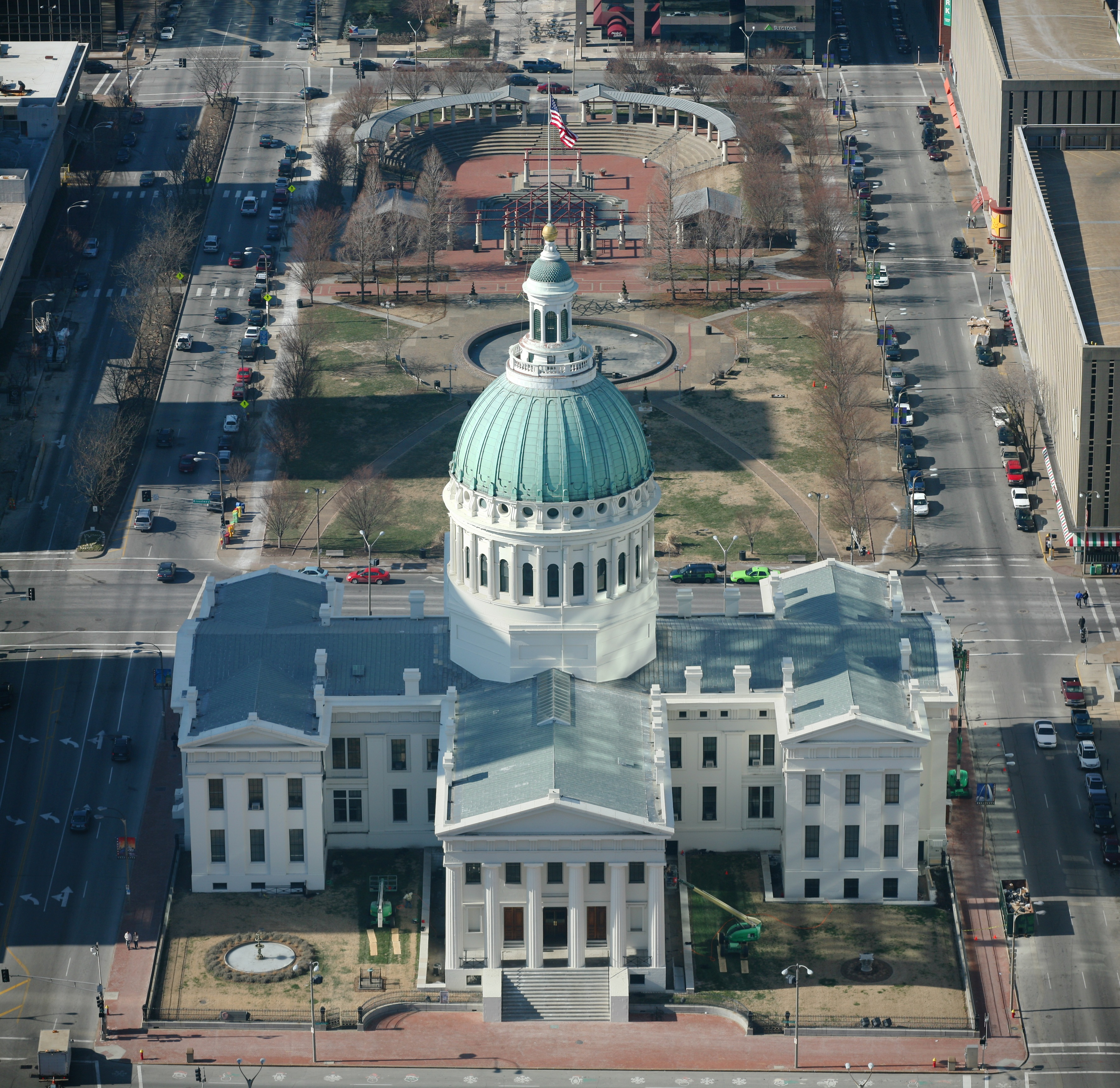
Kiener Plaza prior to reconstruction

Kiener Plaza was built in two halves across 21 years. After city voters passed a $2 million bond issue in 1962, the eastern half opened in 1965 between Broadway and 6th Street. This first section included a circular fountain with William Zorach’s sculpture, The Runner, placed in the center with the runner facing west. A $6.2 million bond issue to complete the Mall was rejected by voters in 1965 leaving the western half unfinished. In 1986, 6th Street was closed and Kiener Plaza was extended west with the Morton D. May Amphitheater, designed as a postmodern Roman ruin with a capacity for about 500 people.

After a real estate dispute in 1984, the city took ownership of 25% of the block with the remaining share owned by Southern Real Estate and Financial Company which leased it back to the city of St. Louis.

Improvements proposed in the 2009 Gateway Mall Master Plan included an event lawn, a performance pavilion and plaza, new lighting, and bringing the sunken portion of the park up to street level. Many of these improvents were carried out during the 2016-17 rebuild.

In February 2016, Kiener Plaza closed for a $23 million rebuild as part of the $380 million CityArchRiver project. It reopened on May 19, 2017 and saw the sunken amphitheater replaced with street level open spaces, a playground, a water feature, and a lawn that can accommodate up to 3,000 people. The Runner statue and fountain were moved to the center of the park with a new LED lighting system.

The plaza is named for Harry Kiener, a local philanthropist and member of the U.S. track team at the 1904 Olympics held in St. Louis. In his will, Kiener left the city a bequest to build a fountain and statue. Because of its central location within downtown St. Louis, the plaza is often host to public events including outdoor free movies and a winter festival. It is often used as a rallying point for demonstrations and protest marches.

East of Kiener Plaza is the Old Courthouse and Gateway Arch National Park. To the west is Peabody Plaza, to the north the Kiener Plaza garages and to the south the Hilton St. Louis at the Ballpark, whose lobby is constructed out of the Spanish Pavilion from the 1964 New York World's Fair.
