= Ballpark Village (St. Louis) =

Mixed-use development in St. Louis, Missouri

Coordinates: 38.6239°N 90.1926°W

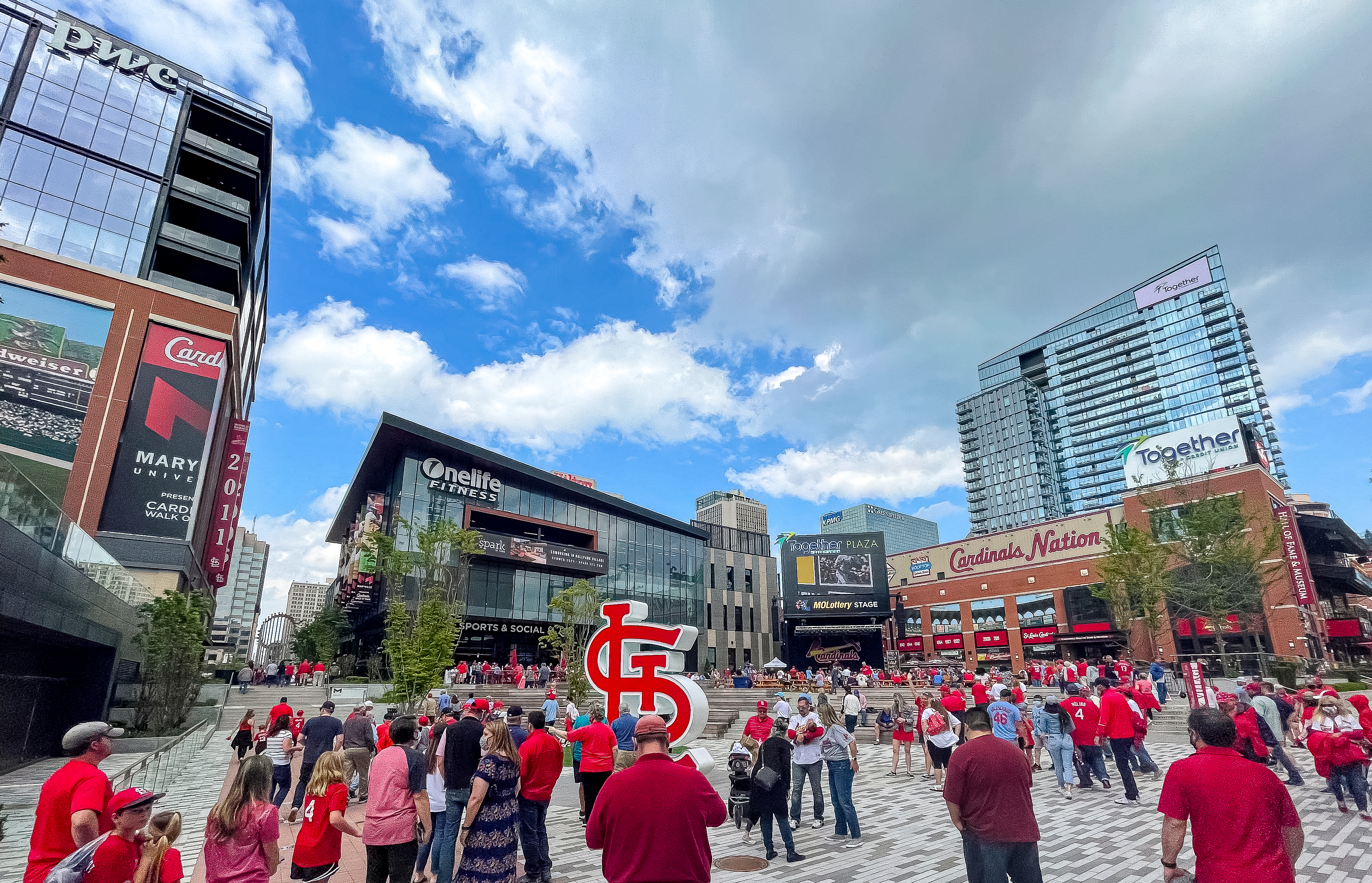
- Fans at Ballpark Village in 2021
- Interactive map of Ballpark Village
- Address: 601 Clark Avenue
- Location: St. Louis, Missouri, U.S.
- Owner: St. Louis Cardinals
- Operator: The Cordish Companies (Live! Hospitality & Entertainment for Bally Sports Live!)
- Capacity: 2,200 (Bally Sports Live!); 2,600 (Outdoor Plaza)
- Type: Mixed-use development
- Public transit: Red Blue; At Stadium

Construction
- Opened: 2014
- Expanded: 2020
- Cost: $100 million (Phase I) $260 million (Phase II)

Website
- https://www.stlballparkvillage.com

Ballpark Village (BPV) is a mixed-use development district in Downtown St. Louis, Missouri, U.S.. Located on the 200 and 300 blocks of Clark Street, it sits across the street from and is meant to complement Busch Stadium, the home ballpark of the St. Louis Cardinals of Major League Baseball (MLB), on the site of the demolished Busch Memorial Stadium.

Proposed in the late 1990s, the development was executed in two phases by primary developer Cordish Company. The first phase, opened before the start of the 2014 Major League Baseball season, is a $100 million, 150,000-square-foot (14,000 m^{2}) facility that includes bars, restaurants — several with a view onto the field — events venues, 720 parking spaces, and the Cardinals Hall of Fame and Museum. The second phase of the development, a $260 million, 700,000-square-foot expansion which included a luxury highrise apartment building, a ten-story office building, a boutique hotel, a fitness club, and numerous new restaurants and retail spaces, broke ground in late 2017 and was opened in stages, beginning in mid-2020.

== Components ==
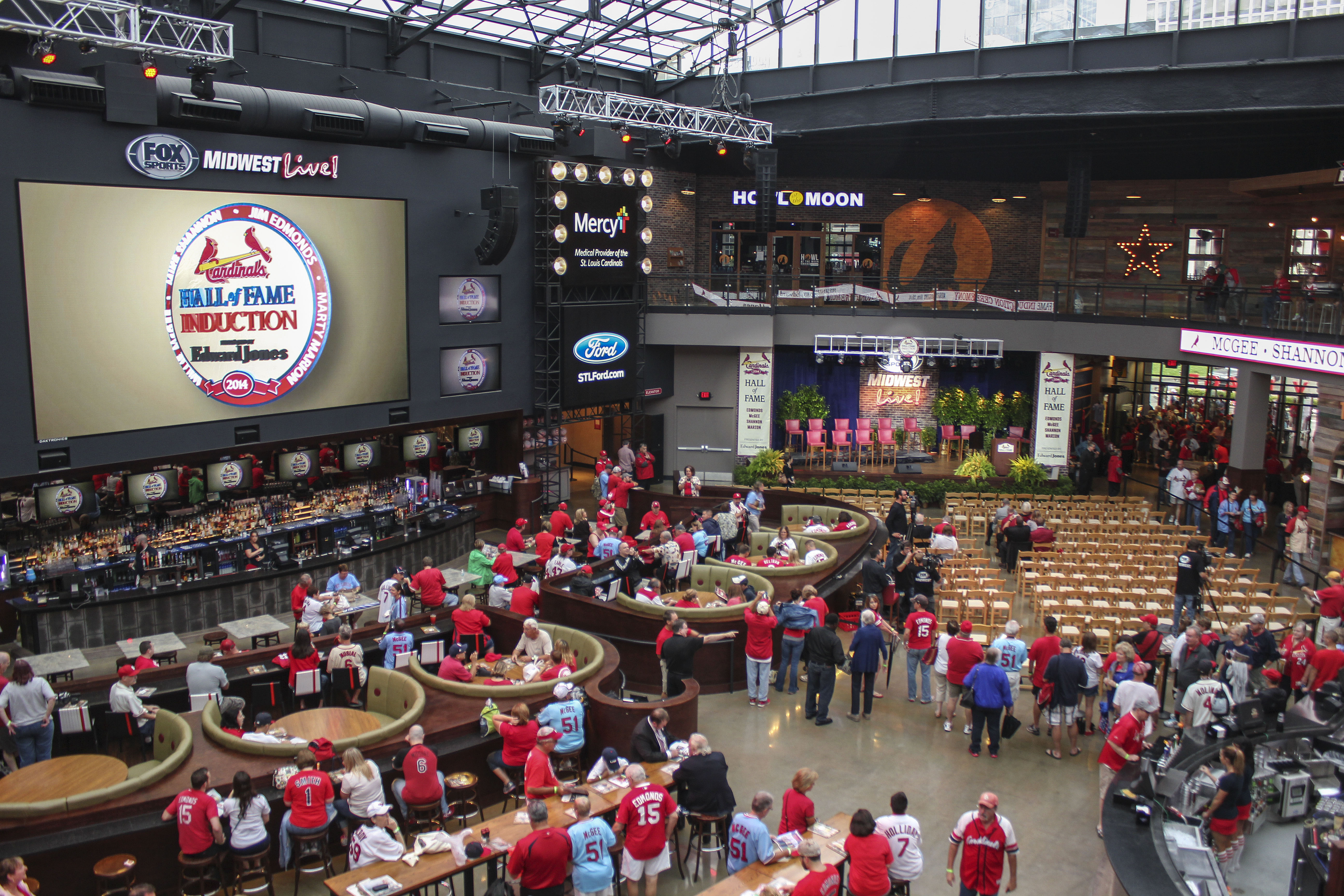
Cardinals Hall of Fame ceremony in 2014

- A 30,000-square-foot (2,800 m^{2}), three-story building houses the St. Louis Cardinals Hall of Fame Museum on the third floor and the Cardinal Nation Restaurant on the first two floors. The restaurant was designed by Jeffrey Beers International and features memorabilia, three patios, two large bars, and large flatscreen TVs. On the roof, more than 300 ticketed seats provide views into the stadium plus audio and visual feeds of games and food and beverage service. The Cardinals Hall of Fame has plaques of the greatest players in team history and other artifacts in 8,000 square feet of display space. In January 2014, less than two months before Opening Day, 2014, Cardinals chairman William DeWitt, Jr., introduced a formal selection process to enshrine former Cardinals players and personnel as members of the team Hall of Fame. As of 2015, a total of 30 people were enshrined.
- Budweiser Brew House: 20,000 square foot (1,900 m^{2}) beer garden serving more than 100 beers, German-inspired cuisine, nightly live music, and rooftop seating with views into the stadium.
- Bally Sports Midwest Live! a marketplace and event venue with a retractable canopy. Intended to be the main gathering place in Ballpark Village, it connects the Brew House and Cardinal Nation buildings.
- PBR St. Louis, a cowboy bar featuring a southwestern-style menu, beer and bourbon selection, dance floor, a mechanical bull, soft-seating lounge, several private balconies, and multiple bars. It features live country music performances in the style of Hot Country Nights throughout the year.
- Together Credit Union Plaza, which features a large outdoor video screen, lounge chairs, a stage, and a bar. The plaza was built on the site of Busch Memorial Stadium's infield and locations of the bases are marked with plaques. It is used for away game watch parties, pre-game concerts and events, and other functions including movie screenings and fitness classes.
- A Cardinals Authentics Store and two other retail outlets, Arch Apparel (a local brand that sells St. Louis-themed shirts and hats) and Baseballism (offering clothing and accessories inspired by baseball).
- The second phase added Sports & Social (an indoor-outdoor bar with popular pub games and Tex-Mex cuisine), The Original Meatball Co. (sandwiches and meatballs), local BBQ restaurant Salt + Smoke, a Onelife Fitness gym, and a full branch of Scott Credit Union.

The venues offer more than 200 events annually, a complement to the 81 days of Cardinals home games.

== History ==
The Ballpark Village project was first proposed in the late 1990s, when the Cardinals’ owners began planning to replace the 1966 Busch Memorial Stadium with a new structure, dubbed Busch Stadium. But after the new stadium opened in 2006, Ballpark Village stalled and the site sat dormant. The project’s size and scope changed repeatedly over the years.

=== Phase One ===
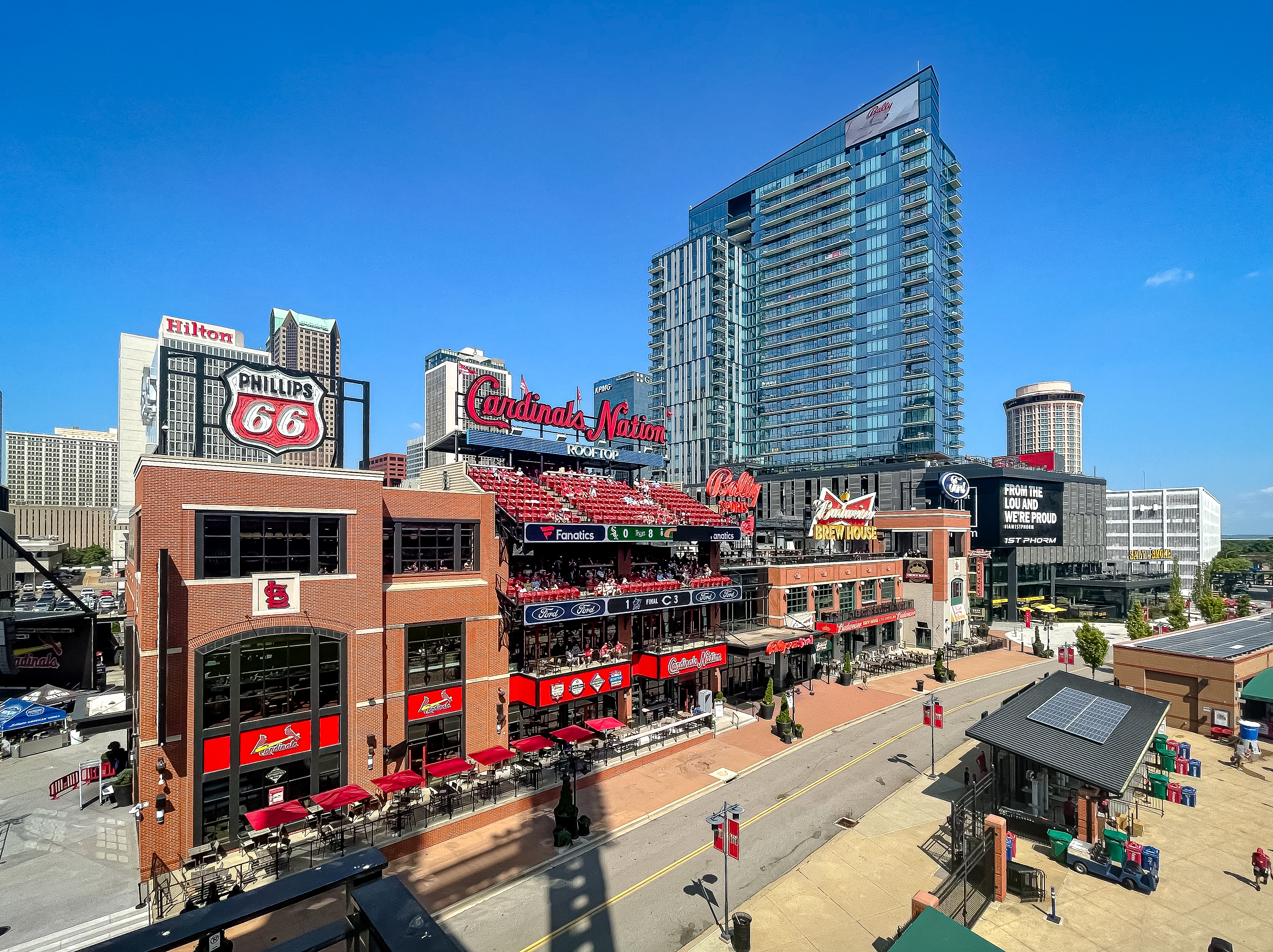
Phase One in the foreground with the Phase Two residential tower in the background

The Cardinals corporation asked for and received $49 million in tax breaks from the City of St. Louis to help build the $100 million first phase.

Ground was officially broken on February 8, 2013, for the 150,000-square-foot (14,000 m^{2}) first-phase of the project. A few days earlier, the Cardinals corporation released artist's illustrations of the planned venue. On February 14, the Cardinals announced plans to add the PBR Cowboy Bar to the entertainment area. This part of the project moved along with little delay. On August 27, the final truss intended to hold the retractable roof was laid into place. On September 18, chief operations officer Jim Watry announced plans for more than 1,000 jobs. The Cardinals Museum and Cardinal Nation Restaurant and Budweiser Brew House have rooftop seating similar to that found outside Chicago's Wrigley Field.

The St. Louis Cardinals announced the addition of three tenants to BPV on November 14, 2013, including The Drunken Fish (a sushi restaurant), Howl at the Moon (a piano bar), and Ted Drewes Frozen Custard.

The grand opening was March 27, 2014.

=== Phase Two ===
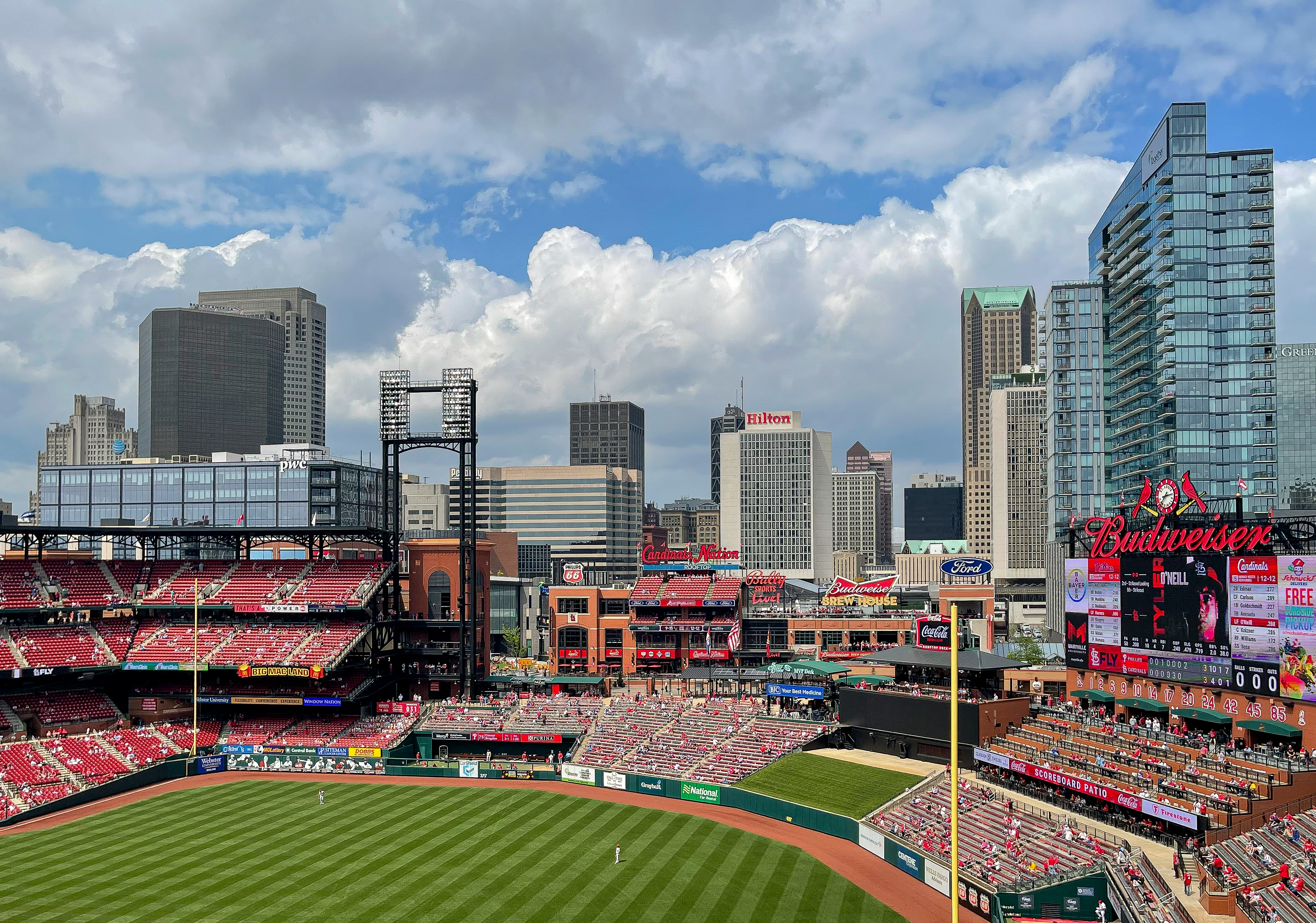
Phase Two buildings seen from Busch Stadium in 2021

On October 25, 2016, the Cardinals announced the second phase of Ballpark Village, scheduled to begin construction in late 2017 and be completed 18 months later, pending governmental and funding approval. The $260 million plan includes a 29-story residential tower, a 10-story office building, an 8-story Live! by Loews hotel, and a 3-story retail building with shops, restaurants, Onelife Fitness, and more amenities. The total amount of space in this phase will be 100,000 square feet (9,300 m^{2}) of office space, 10,000 square feet (930 m^{2}) of entertainment, 50,000 square feet (4,600 m^{2}) of retail, and 340,000 square feet (32,000 m^{2}) of residential. Ground was officially broken on December 14, 2017.

On November 30, 2016, a committee within the St. Louis Board of Aldermen approved a plan to give the Cardinals corporation $16 million in tax breaks for the second phase.

Construction of the $260 million second phase officially began on December 14, 2017 and began opening in June 2020.

=== Phase Three ===
On November 3, 2021, the Cardinals and Cordish announced the start of Phase 3, which is projected to develop the remaining land in the area within three to six years. Cardinals President Bill Dewitt III said the work would focus on residential use, thanks to the success of earlier such efforts.

== See also ==
- The Battery Atlanta - a similar mixed-use development adjacent to Truist Park, home of the Atlanta Braves
- Metropolitan Park (Queens) - a planned mixed-used development adjacent to Citi Field, home of the New York Mets
