= National Blues Museum =

Museum in St. Louis, Missouri, USA

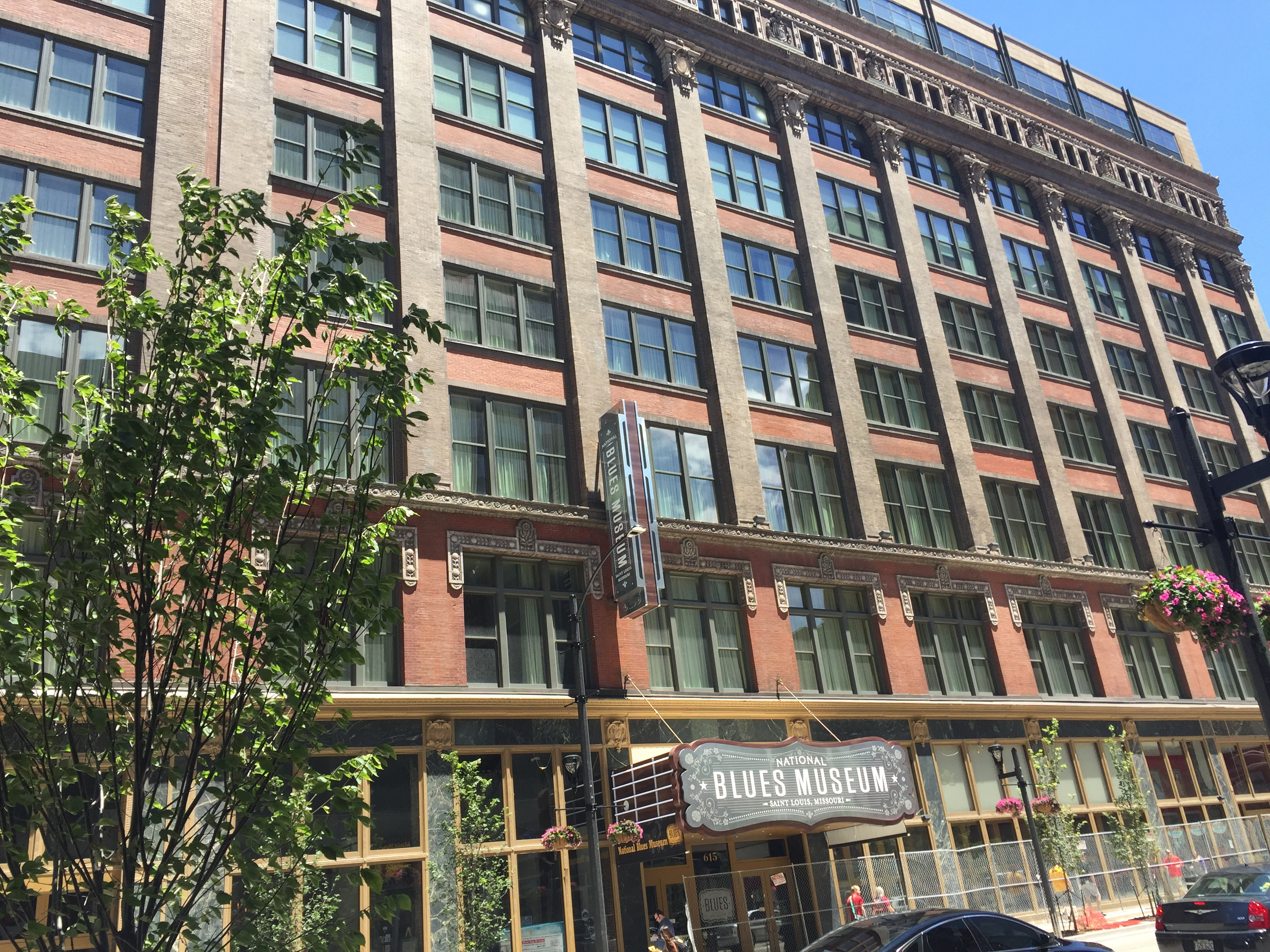
- National Blues Museum
- Established: April 8, 2016
- Dissolved: March 27, 2026
- Location: St. Louis, Missouri, United States
- Coordinates: 38.6305°N 90.1898°W
- Executive director: Robert Nelson
- Chairperson: Robert J. Endicott
- Public transit access: MetroBus; Red Blue; At Convention Center
- Website: www.nationalbluesmuseum.org

The National Blues Museum was a 501(c)(3) non-profit museum in St. Louis, Missouri, United States, dedicated to exploring the musical history and impact of the blues. It existed as an entertainment and educational resource focusing on blues music. The Museum offered a rotating collection of exhibits, live performances in the Lumiere Place Legends room, and was available for private events.

== History ==
The museum opened on April 8, 2016. Surly King, the daughter of B.B. King, spoke at the museum opening. The museum cost $14 million (equivalent to $18.8 million in 2025) to create in a renovated historic building in downtown St. Louis. Prior to the museum’s opening, the agency Project 13 developed the museum’s original brand identity, graphic design, fundraising collateral, and website.

In the 2023–24 NHL season, the St. Louis Blues partnered with the museum to provide pre-game performances at the Blues' hockey games and STEM-focused community outreach from the museum.

The museum closed on March 27, 2026, due to ongoing economic challenges and a decline in visitors.

== See also ==
- List of music museums
- Delta Blues Museum
