= Red Hat Amphitheater =

Entertainment venue in Raleigh

Coordinates: 35.7736°N 78.6428°W

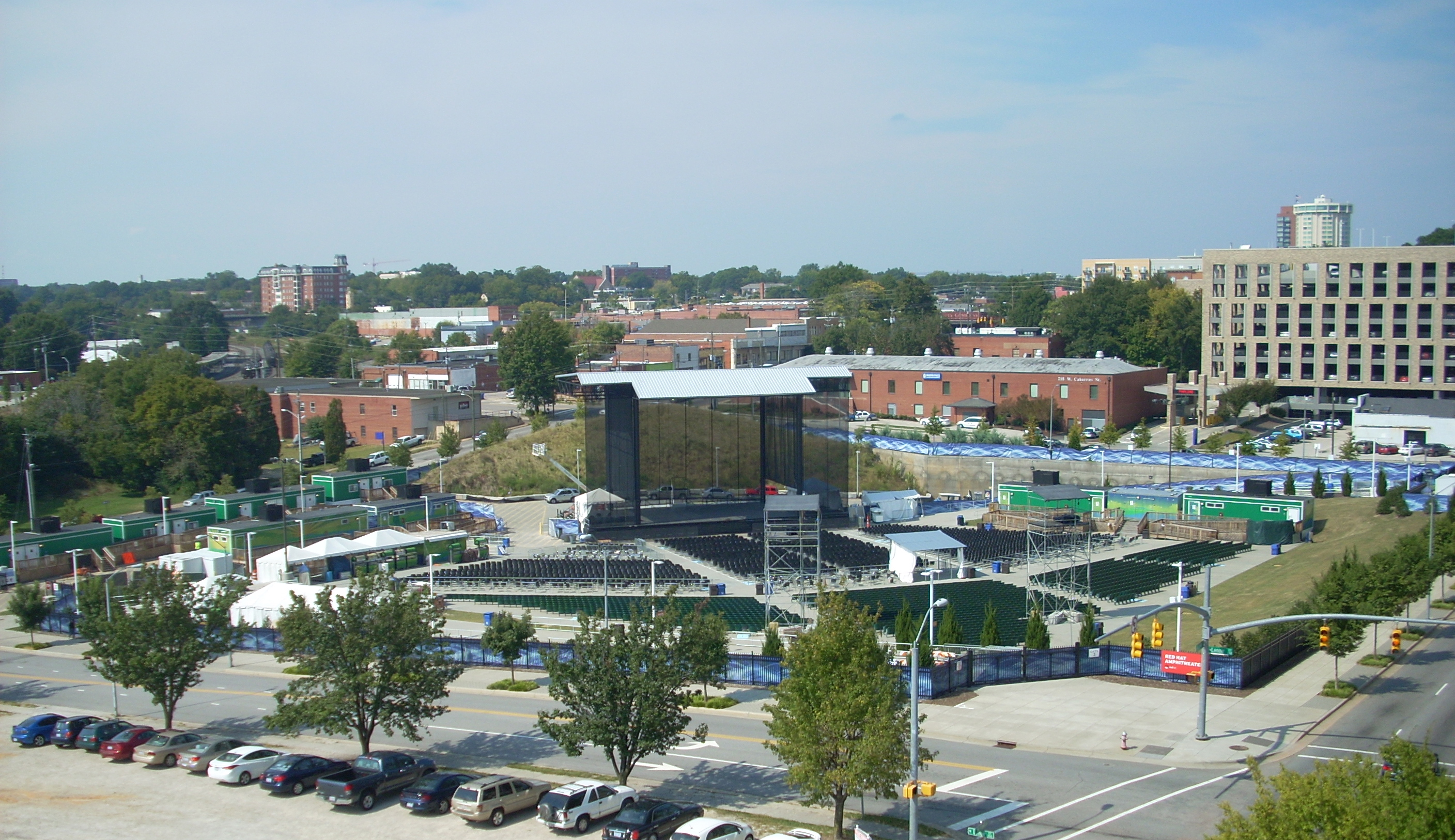
- Interactive map of Red Hat Amphitheater
- Former names: Raleigh Amphitheater (2010–2012)
- Address: 500 South McDowell Street; Raleigh, North Carolina 27601
- Owner: City of Raleigh
- Operator: Live Nation
- Capacity: 5,990
- Type: Amphitheater

Construction
- Opened: June 4, 2010; 16 years ago
- Closed: October 23, 2026; 25 days ago

Website
- Venue website

The Red Hat Amphitheater (formerly the Raleigh Amphitheater) was an amphitheatre in Raleigh, North Carolina. It was adjacent to the Raleigh Convention Center.

Artists were signed to the Red Hat Amphitheater through an agreement with Live Nation, and was owned by the City of Raleigh and operated by Live Nation. The amphitheater's season run from April to October. The seating capacity was 5,990: 1,800 fixed seats; 2,700 movable seats; and lawn space for 1,000.

The venue's original name was the Raleigh Amphitheater during its construction and first two years of operation. Budweiser had planned a $300,000 deal to name the venue the Bud Light Amphitheater, but plans were canceled when the North Carolina Alcohol Control Board refused to give an exception to rules which disallow naming rights for public facilities to be sold to alcohol manufacturers. On September 4, 2012, Red Hat signed a $1.175 million deal with the City of Raleigh for naming rights to the amphitheater.

The amphitheater closed its original location on October 23, 2026, and will relocate to a different location in 2027.

== Concerts ==
The amphitheater hosted numerous concerts with bands and artists such as Arctic Monkeys, Disturbed, Huddy, Marilyn Manson, Melanie Martinez and The Smashing Pumpkins.

== See also ==
- List of contemporary amphitheatres
