= Claudia Cuesta =

Colombian artist

Claudia Cuesta is a Colombian artist based in Sechelt, British Columbia.

== Education ==
She obtained an MFA from the Slade School of Fine Art, University College of London where she studied with Rachel Whiteread, Marcus Taylor, and Melanie Counsell.

== Exhibitions ==
Since coming to Canada after studying in the UK in 1990, she has participated in several group exhibitions. Her installation Relic of Time (1987–88) and Symbolic Correspondence (1993) at the Toronto Power Plant 1993 exhibition Whiteness and Wounds addressed the issue of hurt and repair. At the Vancouver Art Gallery 1993 exhibition Out of Place, Cuesta contributed three installations Attempting to Integrate (1986-1987), Life Perpetually Starting (1993), and Journey (1993) that explored her self-reflexive journey to becoming an artist.

In 1998, Cuesta had a solo exhibition at the Vancouver Contemporary Art Gallery entitled CONFESSION (from a payphone). The exhibition centred on resolving personal, religious concerns, on acknowledging the Roman Catholic household in which she was raised and her current attitude towards the religion.

== Public art works ==
Cuesta collaborates with urban designer Bill Baker on a number of public projects under the name art.site. Installations by Cuesta and Baker can be seen in various cities of the Greater Vancouver area including: the cities of Richmond, BC, Surrey, BC and North Vancouver, BC.

== Awards ==
Cuesta is the recipient of numerous Canada Council grants and a B. C. Cultural Fund Award. In 2011, Cuesta and Baker received the Public Award of Excellence for their public art installation Trees and Trail Markers in the city of North Vancouver.
