= Joe Wos =

American cartoonist

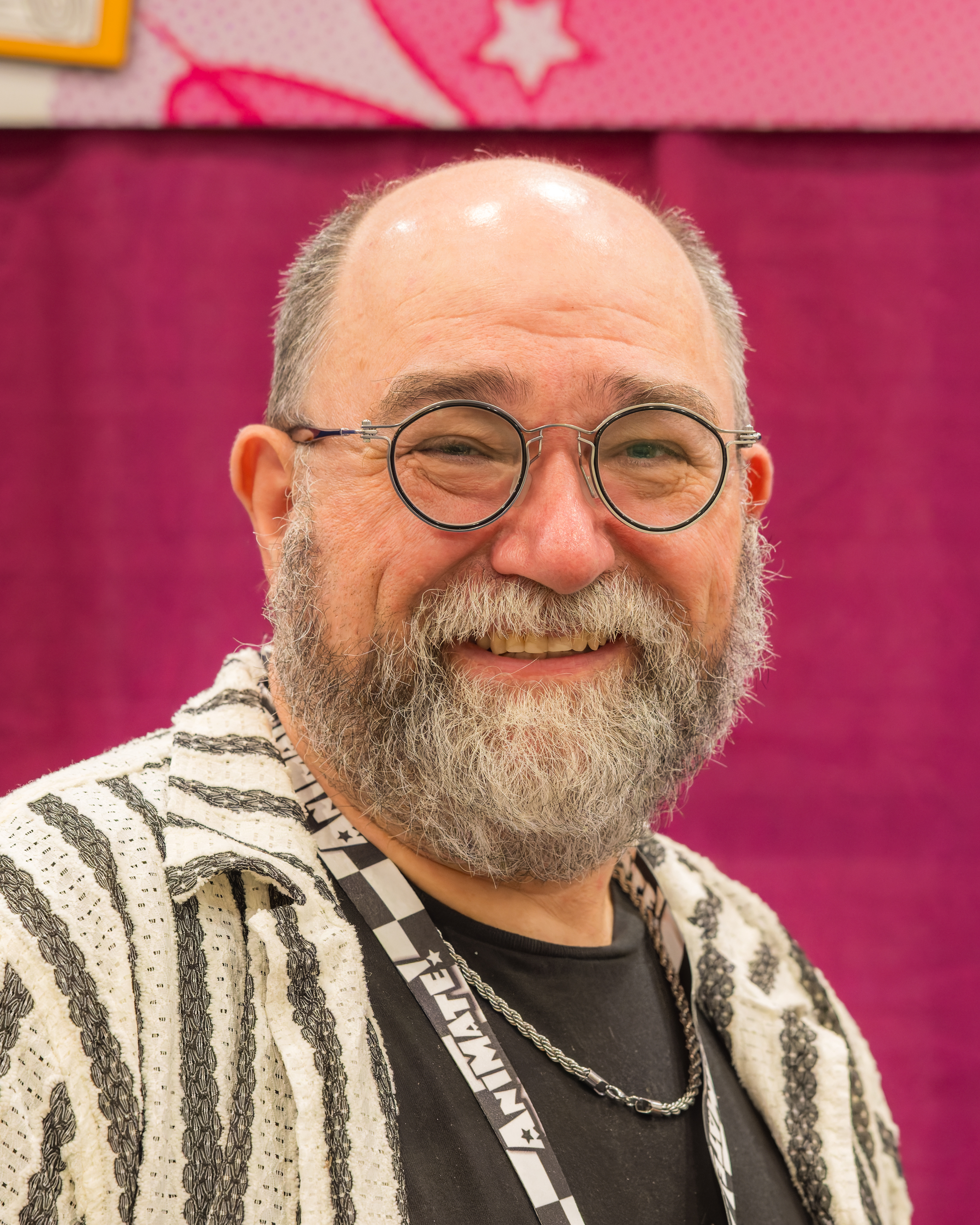
- Wos at Animate! Orlando in 2026
- Areas: Cartoonist, Writer, Inker
- Awards: Silver Reuben Award, Variety category, 2019

Joe Wos is an American cartoonist, author, and television presenter. He founded the ToonSeum in Pittsburgh, Pennsylvania, US, the third museum devoted exclusively to the cartoon arts in the United States of America. He hosts the series Cartoon Academy with Joe Wos, which airs on WQED and digitally, and created the Mazetoons syndicated cartoon and related series of books. He has also served as visiting cartoonist at the Charles M. Schulz Museum in California since its opening in 2001, and draws the Charlie the Tuna mascot for StarKist.

== Awards and recognition ==
In 2019, Wos received the National Cartoonists Society Silver Reuben Award in the Variety category for Mazetoons.

Wos has received four Mid-Atlantic Emmy Awards for his television show Cartoon Academy with Joe Wos for Education/Schools—Short Form Content and Talent—Program Host/Moderator in 2022, and for Education/Schools—Long Form Content and Talent—Program Host/Moderator in 2023.
