= America's Center =

Convention center located in downtown St. Louis, Missouri

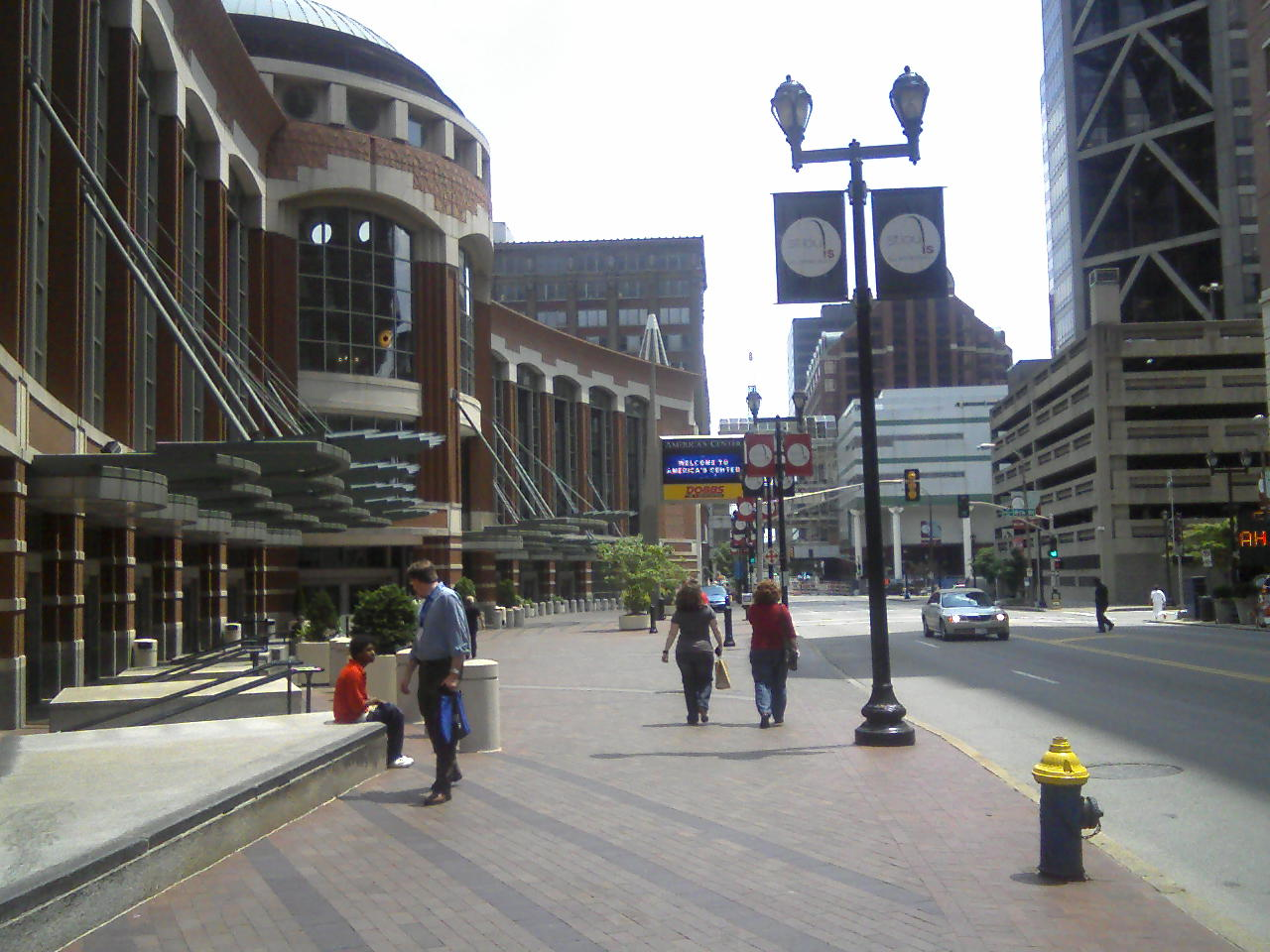
- Outside of America's Center during the 2010 American Society for Quality (ASQ) annual meeting on 24 May.
- Interactive map of America's Center
- Former names: Cervantes Convention Center
- Location: St. Louis, Missouri
- Coordinates: 38°37′56″N 90°11′27″W
- Owner: St. Louis Regional Sports Authority
- Operator: St. Louis Convention/Visitors Bureau
- Public transit: Red Blue; At Convention Center

Construction
- Opened: July 1977
- Expanded: 1995

Website
- explorestlouis.com/meetings-conventions/americas-center/

America's Center is a convention center located in downtown St. Louis, Missouri, and is situated next to the Dome at America's Center, the former home of the National Football League's St. Louis Rams (now the Los Angeles Rams) and the current home of the United Football League's St. Louis BattleHawks. The Center and the Dome often combine to hold large events. The venue opened in 1977 as the Cervantes Convention Center (named for former mayor Alfonso J. Cervantes), and has held many events over the years, including the Working Women's Survival Show, the All-Canada Show, the National Rifle Association Annual Meeting, the St. Louis Boat and Sports Show, and the triennial Urbana Christian missions conference. It also held the 2026 VEX Robotics World Championship, with the Dome hosting finals.

America's Center was the scene for the 2007 National Rifle Association Annual Meetings and Exhibits, and hosted the DHL Major League Baseball All-Star Fan Fest in July 2009. It hosted the American Society for Quality 2010 meeting.

== Layout ==
America's Center consists of a single building which has seven contiguous exhibit halls, 97 flexible rooms (59 meeting rooms and 38 show office/storage rooms), The Dome at America's Center, the Fererra theatre, and a ballroom.

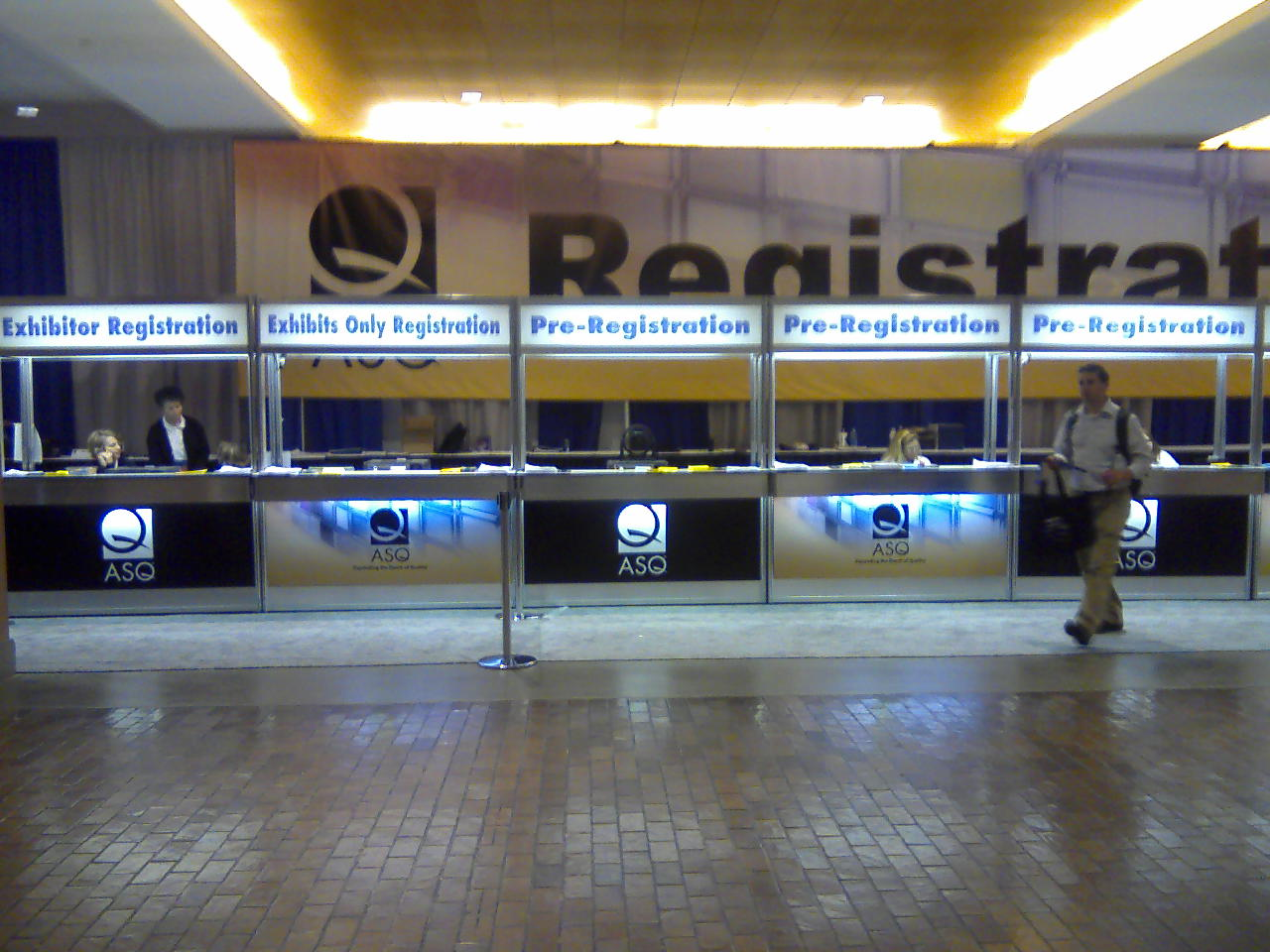
Registration booth for ASQ's 2010 meeting at America's Center on 24 May.

== History ==
In the 1990s Trans World Airlines operated a ticket office in the center.

In May 2022, construction began on AC Next Gen, a $210 million expansion project including a 72,000-square foot expansion to hall four, two new entrances, enclosed loading docks, and reconfiguring Cole St.
