= Atlantic Union Bank Convention Center =

Convention and exhibition facility in downtown Raleigh, North Carolina

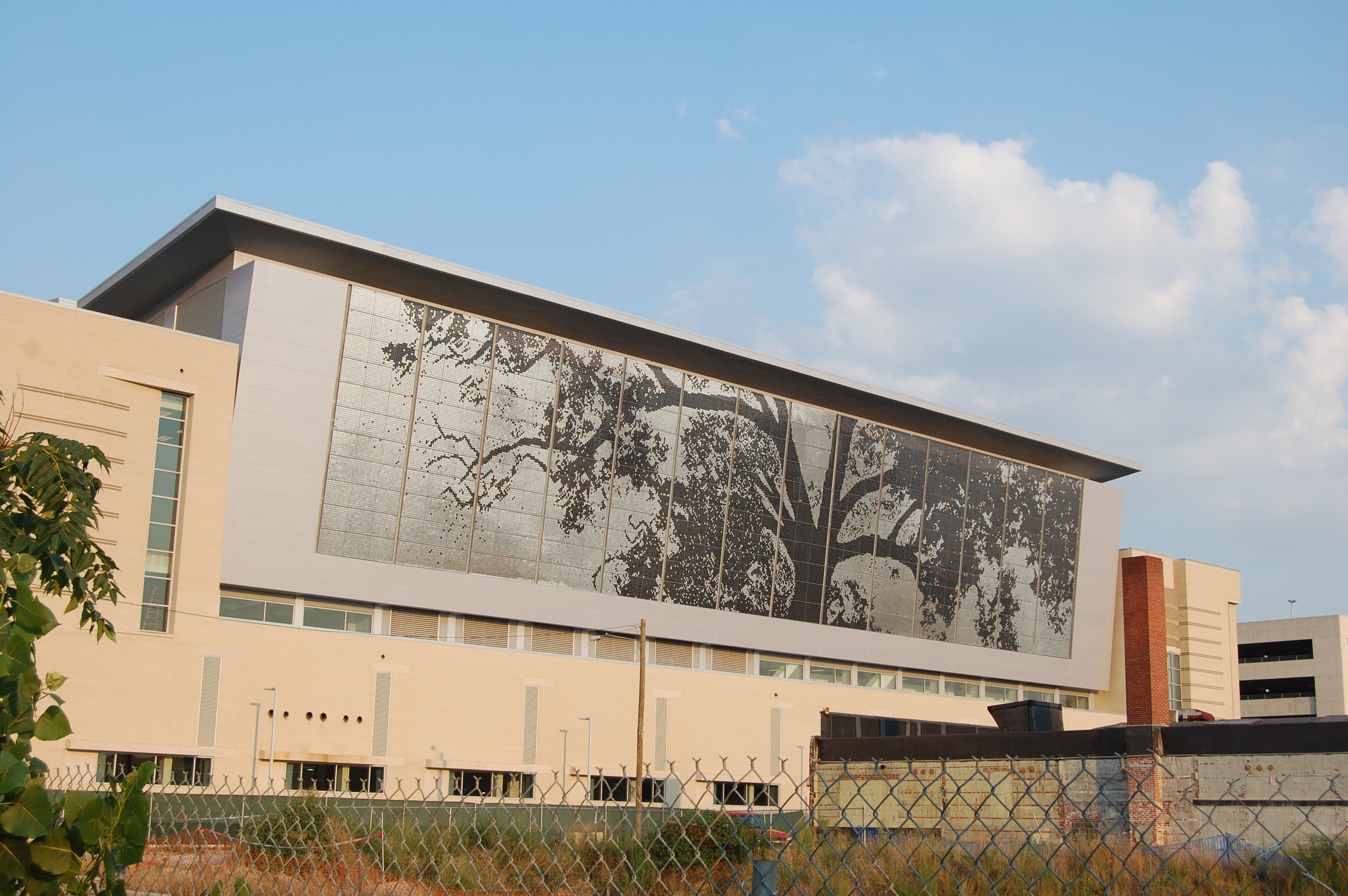
- Side facing McDowell Street along with Shimmer Wall
- Interactive map of Atlantic Union Bank Convention Center
- Former names: Raleigh Convention Center (2008-2026)
- Address: 500 S. Salisbury St; Raleigh, NC 27601
- Coordinates: 35°46′25″N 78°38′28″W

Construction
- Built: 2006–2008
- Opened: September 5, 2008

Website
- atlanticunionbankconventioncenter.com

The Atlantic Union Bank Convention Center, formerly known as the Raleigh Convention Center, is a convention and exhibition facility in downtown Raleigh, North Carolina. Opening in September 2008, the venue is 500,000 square feet. The center hosts over 300 event days annually. It is one of four venues in the Raleigh Convention and Performing Arts Complex. The RCC is located near the North Carolina State Capitol, Fayetteville Street, and Raleigh Union Station. The International Association of Venue Managers (IAVM) recognized the Raleigh Convention Center as one of the leading venues globally with the 2025 Venue Excellence Award. The architect was Tvsdesign with the participation of local firms O'Brien/Atkins Associates and Clearscapes.

== Description ==
Located at 500 South Salisbury Street, the three-level 500,000-square-foot (46,000 m^{2}) building contains a 150,000-square-foot (14,000 m^{2}) exhibit hall, twenty meeting rooms and a 32,000-square-foot (3,000 m^{2}) ballroom.

The ballroom on the highest level can seat up to 2,715 persons (banquet-style) or 3,630 persons (theater-style). The exhibit hall on the lowest level can hold up to 790 booths or seat up to 6,800 persons (banquet-style) or 9,600 persons (theater-style). Extensive acoustics work was performed to not only provide sound isolation between adjacent activities within the center, but also to control noise output to the surrounding community.

The facility is more than double the size of the older convention center that was erected in 1977, renovated in 1997, and torn down in February 2006. There had been controversy about the older building as well as the site of the new building.

The building cost $225 million to construct. A new Marriott hotel named Marriott City Center was built to provide lodging for visitors and now connects to the Convention Center.

The west-facing wall of the new convention center boasts a large public art piece called the 'Shimmer Wall', which was completed in 2009. It contains 80,000 aluminum panels backed by LED lights. The piece is 44 feet tall and 210 feet wide. It is a work of a local artist Thomas Sayre. 'Shimmer Wall' features a giant oak tree, which represents Raleigh's nickname, the 'City of Oaks'. The wall was sponsored by Cree Inc., a local company that manufactures LED lights.

National Agents Alliance held its NAA Leadership Conference on Sept. 11-14, 2008 and was the first convention held in the new center.

On the night of December 1, 2025, a fire broke out on the roof of the convention center, caused by a gas leak. There was limited damage to the building and the fire did not spread to other buildings before being extinguished. Several scheduled events at the center were canceled or postponed as a result.

== Expansion ==
In February 2023, the City of Raleigh announced a $425M expansion that will add 500,000 sqft of meeting space, a 50,000 sqft, and an additional capacity of 20,000 people. In addition, the Red Hat Amphitheater will be relocated and built in a more permanent style.

== Raleigh Convention Hotel and Downtown Development Project ==
In the late 2010s, the City of Raleigh would realize the lack of hotel space near the convention center and began a project to build a new hotel and office building next to the convention center. However, due to Covid, this project was put on hold, until it was resumed in summer of 2022. The city would then realize more need for residential spaces over office spaces in downtown and modified the plan to better accommodate this. The city is currently accepting design proposals and will select a plan sometime in 2023 with the project expected to be complete in 2028. While exact building heights are still unknown, based on conceptual renderings, it is expected that the hotel will rise to roughly 550 feet tall and the residential building will rise to roughly 800 feet tall.

== Downtown Raleigh Amphitheater ==
On June 4, 2010 the City opened the Downtown Raleigh Amphitheater adjacent to the Convention Center, which seats around about 6,000. It got a sponsor name (Red Hat) in September 2012.

== See also ==
- Raleigh Downtown Live
