= Streets of St. Louis =

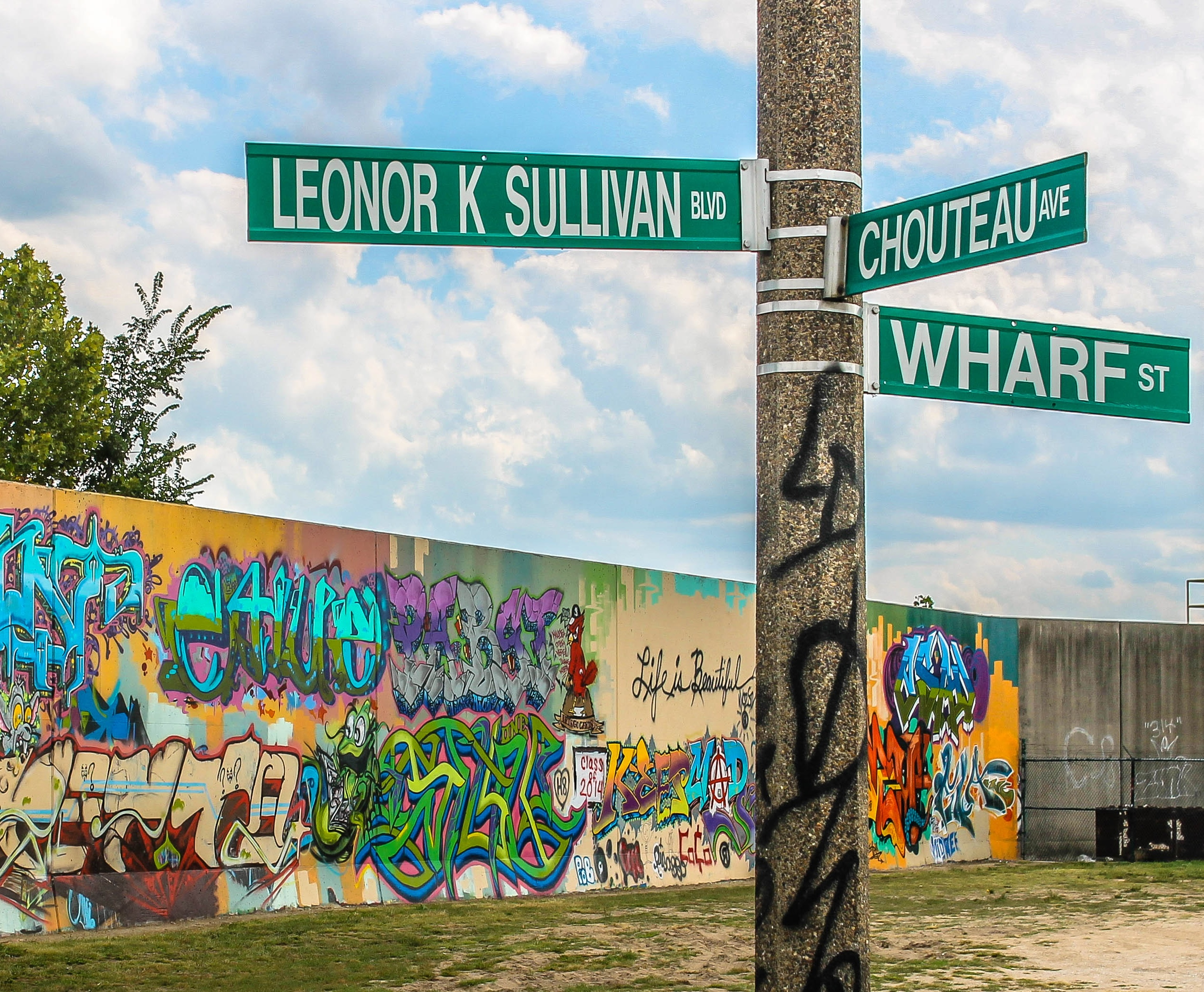
Street signs near the St. Louis Riverfront and Mural Mile

Streets of St. Louis, Missouri, United States, includes avenues, boulevards, highways, and streets under the jurisdiction of the City of St. Louis, St. Louis County and its constituent municipalities.

== Named Streets ==
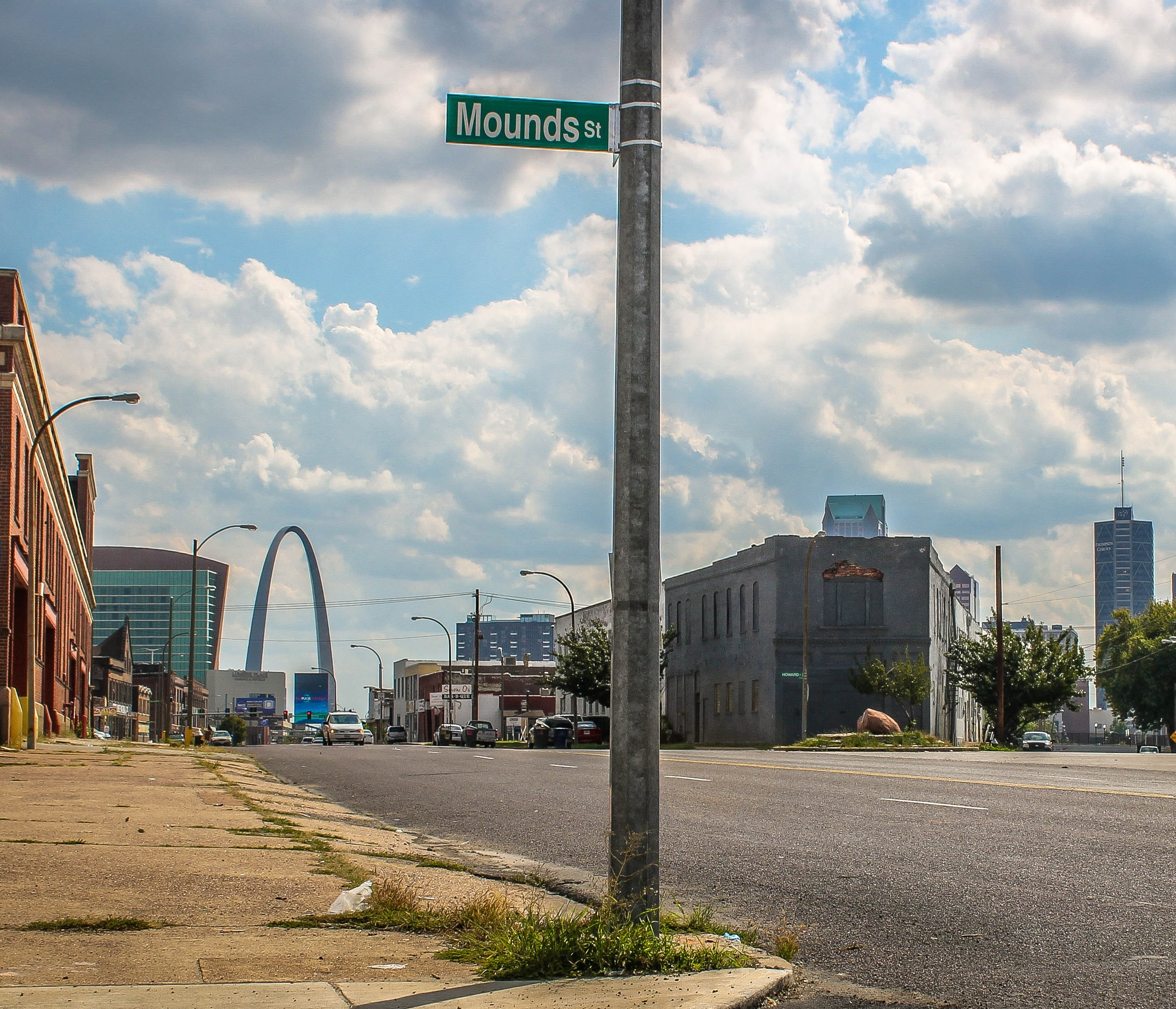
Mounds Street on the North Side

According to the City's Streets Division, there are 1,000 miles (1,600 km) of streets and 600 miles (970 km) of alleys within the city. Streets of note include:

=== Arsenal Street ===
Arsenal runs east–west in South St. Louis from South Broadway near the neighborhoods of Marine Villa and Kosciusko bordering the Mississippi River to the River Des Peres in the Lindenwood Park neighborhood. The street acquired its name from the St. Louis Arsenal, a military equipment storage depot on the east end of the street that is now used primarily for the National Geospatial-Intelligence Agency

=== Bates Street ===
Bates runs in a northwest–southeast direction from Eichelberger Street in the Bevo Mill and Holly Hills neighborhoods to South Broadway in the neighborhood of Carondelet. It is named after Frederick Bates, the second governor of Missouri.

=== Biddle Street ===
Biddle runs east–west from the neighborhood of Near North Riverfront (near the Mississippi River) to 20th Street in the neighborhood of Carr Square in the west. Biddle Street was named after area landowners, Major Thomas Biddle and Mrs. Anne Biddle, the sister of Bryan Mullanphy the tenth mayor of St. Louis. It was previously called Willow Street.

=== Carr Street ===
Carr runs east–west in Downtown St. Louis from the Mississippi River to Jefferson Avenue, between the neighborhoods of Carr Square and JeffVanderLou. It is named after Judge William C. Carr, who in 1813 built the first brick dwelling in St. Louis. In 1822, Carr Street formed part of the northern boundary of the city.

=== Cherokee Street ===
Cherokee runs east–west in South City from Grand Boulevard to South Broadway. It is a historically economically significant area and a culturally significant area in contemporary times.

=== Chestnut Street ===
Chestnut runs east–west street in downtown St. Louis and is the northern boundary of the Gateway Mall.

Originally "La Rue Missouri", it was one of the first named east to west streets in Colonial St. Louis. After the American takeover of the city in 1804 the name was changed to North "A" Street. In 1826, in a general planning scheme to name east–west streets after trees, it became "Chesnut". The spelling was altered to its current form "Chestnut" in 1893.

=== Chippewa Street ===
Chippewa runs east–west from the neighborhoods of Marine Villa, Gravois Park and Dutchtown to the neighborhoods of Lindenwood Park and St. Louis Hills. The street is named after the Chippewa people. The street is part of Missouri Route 366, and from Gravois Road to the west city limits (where it continues as Watson Road), it was part of US Route 66.

=== Cole Street ===
Cole runs east–west from near the intersection of Dr. Martin Luther King Drive and Jefferson Avenue in the neighborhoods of Grand Center and Midtown St. Louis, to North Broadway near Downtown St. Louis and the Near North Riverfront.

Cole Street was once called Wash Street; the name changed sometime after 1900, when documents show that American Arithmometer Company (later the Burroughs Corporation), moved from The LaSalle Building at 509 Olive Street to 1212 Wash Street. Today, 1212 Cole Street is the location of the employee parking lot for KDNL-TV.

=== Commercial Street ===
Commercial is a cobblestone street that runs north–south in Laclede's Landing near Gateway Arch National Park.

=== Delor Street ===
Delor runs east–west from McCausland Avenue in St. Louis Hills, to Nebraska Avenue in the neighborhoods of Mount Pleasant and Carondelet.

Named in honor of Clement Delor deTreget who founded the settlement which later became Carondelet, Missouri in 1767. Prior to 1893 a section was called Termination Street as it marked out the northern border of the Carondelet Commons.

=== Germania Street ===
Germania runs from Gravois Avenue along the River Des Peres in the neighborhood of Boulevard Heights to Alabama Street in the neighborhood of Carondelet. The name refers to a personification of the German nation.

=== Hall Street ===
Hall runs north–south in North St. Louis from Riverview Drive in the neighborhood of Baden to East Grand Boulevard in the Near North Riverfront neighborhood. Named after Edward Hall, a Missouri River ferry operator.

=== Itaska Street ===
Itaska runs from McCausland Street in the neighborhood of St. Louis Hills to South Broadway in the Mount Pleasant neighborhood.

Though spelled with a "k" instead of a "c" it is named to commemorate Lake Itasca in Minnesota, the source of the Mississippi River.

=== Keokuk Street ===
Keokuk runs east–west from Marine Avenue in the Marine Villa neighborhood to the east to Meramec Street in the neighborhood of Dutchtown on the west. It is named for Keokuk a leader of the Sauk Native American people who refused to aid the British in the War of 1812.

=== Laclede Avenue ===
Laclede runs from east to west starting in Midtown, through the Central West End, and stopping at Forest Park. The street is named in honor of St. Louis founder Pierre Laclède Liguest.

=== Lasalle Street ===
Lasalle runs east–west from South Fourth Street through the neighborhoods of Kosciusko, LaSalle Park, Lafayette Square, Gate District, and Tiffany to South Spring Avenue. Named in recognition of René-Robert Cavelier, Sieur de La Salle an explorer of the Mississippi Valley working for the French government to collect information about developing a French empire in the lands of North America. La Salle traveled down the Mississippi River past the future site of St. Louis in 1682.

=== Locust Street ===
Locust runs east–west from North Broadway in Downtown St. Louis to North Theresa Avenue in the Grand Center neighborhood.

=== Lynch Street ===
Lynch is the northern boundary of what was a long narrow strip of land in the Petit Prairie section of St. Louis common land named after William A. Lynch, who developed the area, which was called Labadie and Lynch's Addition in 1856. It begins at South Second Street in the Kosciusko neighborhood, runs through Soulard, Benton Park, Benton Park West, and Fox Park and ends at Pennsylvania Avenue in the Tower Grove East neighborhood.

=== Market Street ===
Market runs east–west from Memorial Drive by the grounds of the Gateway Arch to Compton Avenue in Midtown, where it becomes Forest Park Parkway. Downtown, it is the southern boundary of the Gateway Mall. Further west in Midtown, it is the southern boundary of Harris-Stowe State University. It is the main street in St. Louis for parades and public festivals. There is also a small stretch of Market St. that runs between Prospect Ave. and South Vandeventer Ave. This section is the only part of Market St. that is south of Highway 40/Interstate 64. The old armory of the 138th Infantry building and the old Famous-Barr warehouse are located on this section of Market St.

=== Meramec Street ===
Meramec runs east–west from S. Broadway in the Mount Pleasant neighborhood near the Mississippi River to Chippewa Street in the neighborhoods of Tower Grove South and Dutchtown. Named for the Meramec River the name in turn comes from a Native American term referring to the range of catfish in the waters, and a more unusual fish species, the very large and ancient Paddlefish sometimes called a "Spoonbill Catfish" for its long and flat snout.

=== O'Fallon Street ===
O'Fallon runs east–west from Laclede's Landing in Downtown St. Louis to Jefferson Avenue. The street was named after John O'Fallon a soldier, merchant, and later investor in and president of several early railroads built through St. Louis.

=== Oleatha Avenue ===
Oleatha has two east–west stretches, separated by rail tracks. It runs east–west from Gustine Avenue in the Tower Grove South neighborhood to Bent Avenue. Then it picks up again after the tracks, running west from Morgan Ford Road to Sublette Avenue in the Kingshighway Hills neighborhood.

=== Olive Street ===
Olive runs east–west from Downtown St. Louis to the northern part of the Central West End. In 1821 this road was first named "North C Street", in 1826 it was renamed after the hardy Mediterranean tree and its well-known fruit, the olive. During the 1850s, the road's extension west of Eighteenth Street was called the Olive Street Plank road due to its wooden construction.

=== Parnell Street ===
Parnell runs north–south in the neighborhood of St. Louis Place where it becomes Jefferson Avenue near south of the neighborhoods border. Parnell Street is named to honor Charles Stewart Parnell the prominent Irish parliamentarian, political leader, and supporter of Ireland's return to independence from England.

=== Pestalozzi Street ===
Pestalozzi runs east–west from Soulard through Benton Park and Tower Grove East to Tower Grove Park in the South Grand area. The street is named in honor of Johann Heinrich Pestalozzi, the Swiss educational reformer whose theory and practices influenced modern elementary education.

=== Pine Street ===
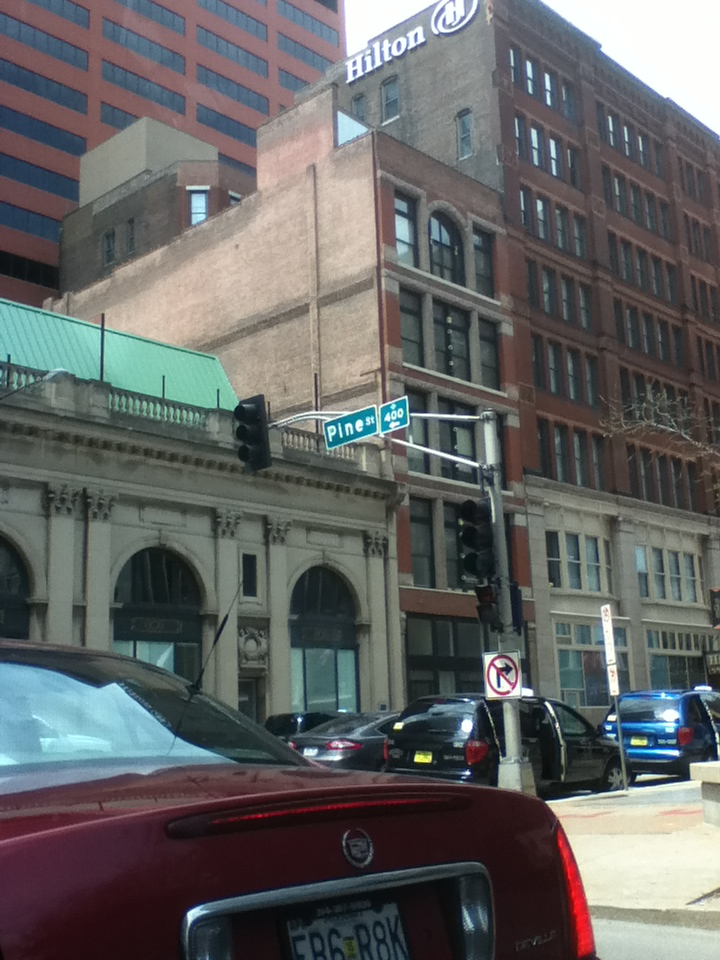
Street sign naming Pine Street

Pine runs east–west from Memorial Drive in Downtown St. Louis to Jefferson Avenue in Downtown West, where it turns into a service entrance at the Wells Fargo campus. It then runs for another block Beaumont Street and Leffingwell Avenue, before being interrupted again. Formerly, it connected to West Pine Boulevard in the Central West End (which runs from Vandeventer Avenue to Forest Park). Between Pine Street and West Pine Boulevard are the campuses of Harris–Stowe State University and Saint Louis University. The former path of Pine Street is preserved as the West Pine Mall, the major pedestrian route through the campus of Saint Louis University.

=== Salisbury Street ===
Salisbury is an east–west street in the Hyde Park neighborhood of St. Louis. It is named after James Salisbury, American civil war doctor, and the creator of the Salisbury steak as part of a diet intended to reduce the incidence of diarrhea among soldiers.

=== Sarah Street ===
Sarah is a major north–south street which runs from the Greater Ville neighborhood on Labadie Street to Vandeventer Avenue in the Forest Park Southeast neighborhood. The song "Down on Sarah Street", which refers to this street, is included on Otis Spann's album The Blues Is Where It's At.

=== Sidney Street ===
Sidney runs from the neighborhood of Kosciusko and the Mississippi River to Grand Avenue near the neighborhoods of Compton Heights and Tower Grove East. Named after Sarah Sidney Carr Lane, the daughter of Dr. William Carr Lane the first mayor of St. Louis and a practicing physician.

=== St. Charles Street ===
St. Charles runs east–west in three segments in the Downtown, and Downtown West neighborhoods. It was formerly a continuous street, but has been interrupted by development. Its first segment is between Fourth Street and Broadway in where it is interrupted for three blocks by Stiffel, Nicolas and Co., the Merchandise Exchange Building, and the US Bank building, respectively. It appears again between Eighth Street and Ninth Street, where it runs alongside the Renaissance Hotel on the north and the Orpheum Theater and the Roberts Mayfair Hotel on the south. It is interrupted here by the parking garage for the Renaissance Hotel. St. Charles Street's final segment runs from 10th Street to Jefferson Avenue. The Mayfair Hotel is also notable for the creation of Mayfair salad dressing.

Despite being a named street, Saint Charles Street is little more than an alley. No buildings front onto it, and it is generally used for garbage pickup, parking and loading and unloading of goods.
