= Numbered streets of St. Louis =

The numbered streets of St. Louis, Missouri generally run north–south through the city, starting with 1st Street at the Mississippi River, and increasing in value the further west they are. 1st through 25th Streets are primarily centered around the Downtown and Downtown West neighborhoods, with many extending further north and south into other neighborhoods. There are a few other higher value streets that appear elsewhere in the St. Louis area, and although they are not adjacent to the 1st–25th grid in the eastern part of the city, their numberings in relation to their distances from the river are relatively consistent.

== 1st Street ==
1st Street is broken by the grounds of Gateway Arch National Park, location of the Gateway Arch. South of the Arch, it runs from Poplar Street down through the Kosciusko neighborhood to Victor Street where it dead-ends. 1st Street starts up again on Potomac Street and eventually turns into Gasconade Street. To the north, it runs from Washington Avenue as far as North Market Street (different from the downtown Market Street. 1st Street briefly shows up again in Near North Riverfront before turning into Kissock Avenue.

== 2nd Street ==
2nd Street is also broken by the grounds of Gateway Arch National Park. South of the Arch, it runs from Poplar Street down to President Street where it dead-ends. It is broken up a couple times in the Kosciusko neighborhood by warehouses. To the north, it runs in several sections from Washington Avenue to Adelaide Avenue.

== 3rd Street ==
Map of Downtown and Downtown West, with many of the numbered streets marked.

In the 1930s, the part of 3rd street beside Gateway Arch National Park (which was named Jefferson National Expansion Memorial at the time) was converted into Memorial Drive. North of Biddle Street, 3rd merges with Broadway and continues on to the city limits.

== 5th Street ==
5th Street is officially known as Broadway. Broadway goes as far south as Lemay in St. Louis County where it turns into Kingston Drive. To the north, Broadway intersects with 3rd Street and runs with it as far as Riverview Blvd where it then becomes Bellefontaine Road. Broadway is one of the major boulevards for St. Louis. In the north it passes O'Fallon Park, Bellefontaine Cemetery, and Calvary Cemetery.

== 12th Street ==
12th Street, later 12th Boulevard, is now officially known as Tucker Boulevard, renamed for former Mayor Raymond R. Tucker. It is double sized and serves as the border between Downtown and Downtown West.

== 18th Street ==
At dawn at 18th and Market Streets.

18th Street in runs north–south through Downtown West. To the south, 18th Street passes over the Union MetroLink Station and under I-64 before becoming Truman Parkway at Chouteau Avenue. To the north, 18th Street passes by Union Station on to the Gateway Mall where it separates the Mall's Neighborhood Room from Aloe Plaza. It continues north past the Salvation Army's Railton Building. 18th Street ends in Carr Square at O'Fallon Street.

== 22nd Street ==
As part of Paul McKee's NorthSide project, the broken section of 22nd street near the I-64 interchange is to be restored and rebuilt. A large office tower has been proposed to anchor it to the expanded Gateway Mall.

== 23rd Street ==
23rd is an irregular street that is broken up in many places. One such break was created by the former Pruitt–Igoe site, as well as the future site of the National Geospatial-Intelligence Agency's West headquarters.

== 25th Street ==
25th Street appears to the north of downtown where Jefferson Avenue curves and creates space for another road.

== Higher value streets ==
=== 30s ===
39th Street is the longest numbered street outside of the 1st–25th region. It splits the Tiffany and Botanical Heights neighborhoods, running south through Shaw and stopping at Tower Grove Park. It briefly reappears in south city's Dutchtown neighborhood.

Dutchtown also contains 37th and 38th Streets.

=== 50s ===
59th Street runs through a portion of The Hill and Southwest Gardens.

=== 60s–80s ===
University City contains the only two numbered streets in the St. Louis area to not have a 'Street' suffix: 66th Avenue and 82nd Boulevard. It also contains 78th, 79th, and 81st Streets.

Further north, 67th, 68th, and 69th Streets comprise a residential area off of St. Louis Avenue in Hillsdale, while 70th and 74th Streets lie to the south of St. Charles Rock Road in Pagedale.

== See also ==
- Streets of St. Louis, Missouri
