= Hyde Park (St. Louis) =

Municipal park in St. Louis, Missouri

Coordinates: 38.6617°N 90.2020°W

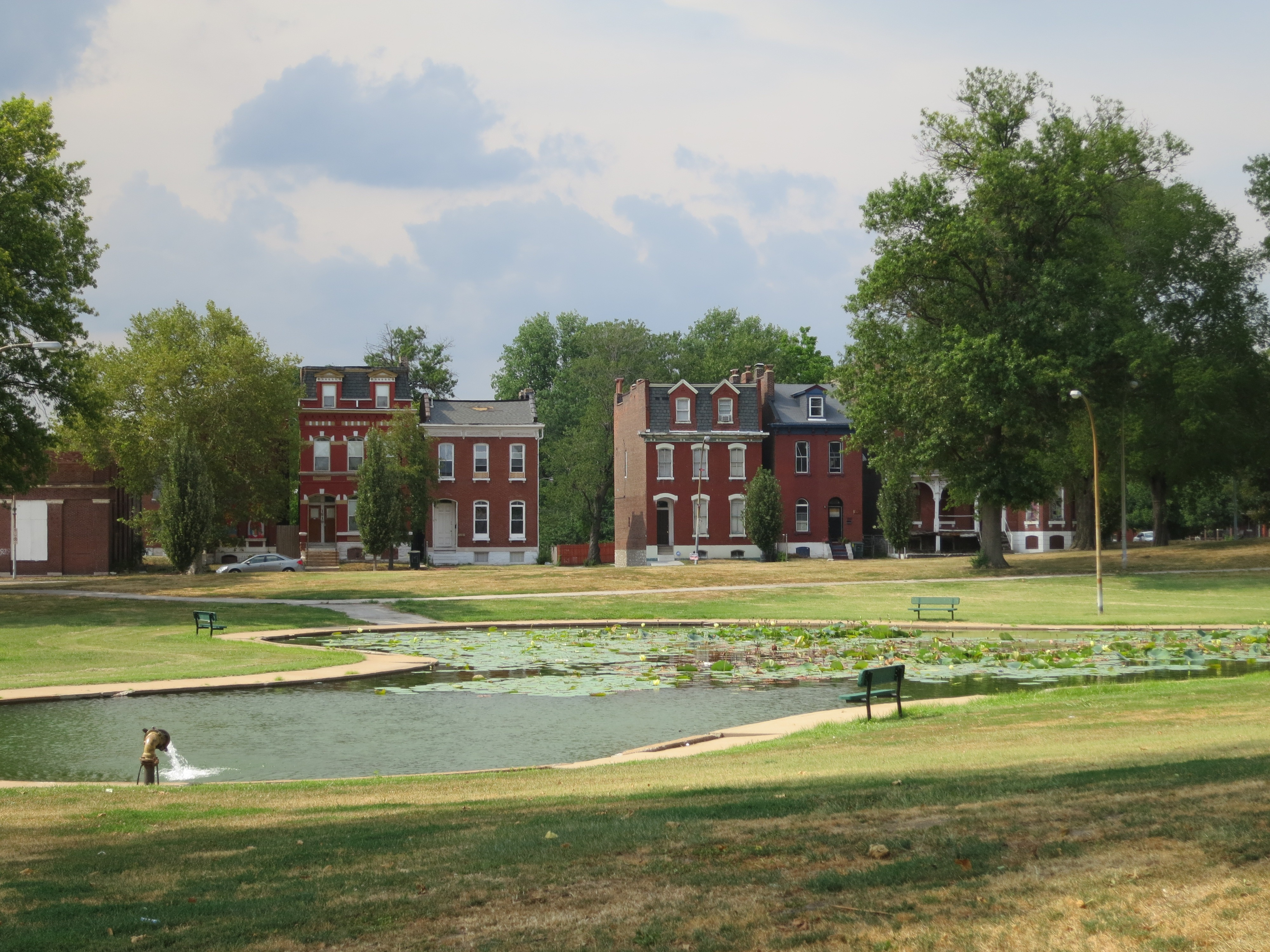
- View of the pond at Hyde Park, July 2012
- Interactive map of Hyde Park
- Type: Municipal Park (St. Louis Park Department)
- Location: St. Louis
- Area: 11.84 acres (47,900 m^{2})
- Created: 1854
- Operator: St. Louis Park Department
- Status: Open
- Public transit: MetroBus

Hyde Park is a municipal park in St. Louis.

== Geography ==
The Hyde Park grounds are centered in the St. Louis neighborhood of Hyde Park.

=== Surrounding area ===
The park is bordered by Blair Ave. on the east, Salisbury Street on the south, 20th Street on the west, and Bremen Ave. on the North.

== See also ==
- People and culture of St. Louis, Missouri
- Neighborhoods of St. Louis
- Parks in St. Louis, Missouri
