= Windsor Park (St. Louis) =

Municipal park in St. Louis, Missouri, US

Coordinates: 38.6655851°N 90.2042459°W

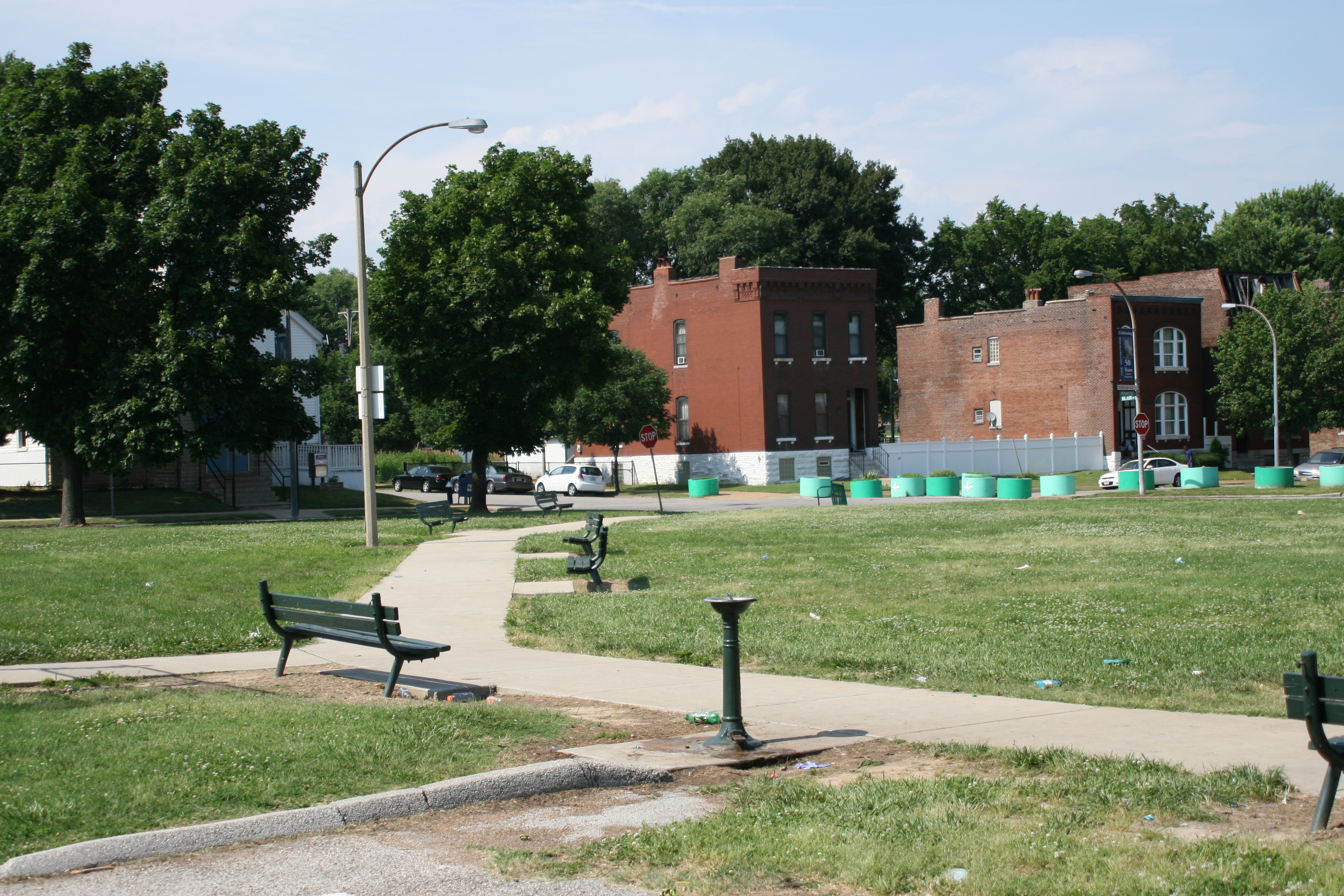
- Windsor Park in 2013
- Interactive map of Windsor Park
- Type: Municipal Park (St. Louis Park Department)
- Location: St. Louis
- Area: 3.33 acres (13,500 m^{2})
- Created: 1947
- Operator: St. Louis Park Department
- Status: Open
- Public transit: MetroBus

Windsor Park is a municipal park in St. Louis.

== Geography ==
Windsor Park is located in the St. Louis neighborhood of Hyde Park.

== Surrounding area ==
The park is bordered by Angelica Street on the south, Blair Ave on the east, 20th Street on the west, and Penrose Avenue on the North.

== See also ==
- Parks in St. Louis, Missouri
