= Meeting of the Waters =

Meeting of the Waters and similar constructs may refer to:

- Meeting of Waters, the confluence of the Rio Negro and Amazon River
- The Meeting of the Waters, a sculpture in Aloe Plaza, St Louis
- Meeting of the Waters, an Irish park where two rivers meet to form the River Avoca
- Meeting-of-the-Waters, an historic house in Franklin, Tennessee
- Meeting of the Waters (EP), by Animal Collective (2017)
- The Meeting of the Waters, a 2002 novel by Caiseal Mór
- The Meeting of the Waters (radio play), 1950 play by Edmund Barclay

== See also ==
- Confluence, discussing the meeting of rivers generally
- Confluence Point State Park at the meeting of the Missouri and Mississippi rivers
- Point State Park, a park where the Allegheny and Monongahela rivers meet to form the Ohio River
- Three Rivers (disambiguation)
