= Memorial Drive =

Memorial Drive may refer to:

== Streets and roads ==
=== Australia ===
- Memorial Drive (Wollongong), New South Wales, Australia
- War Memorial Drive, Adelaide, South Australia

=== Canada ===
- Memorial Drive (Calgary), Alberta, Canada

=== United States ===
- Memorial Drive (Arlington National Cemetery), Virginia
- Memorial Drive (Atlanta), Georgia
- Memorial Drive (Cambridge), Massachusetts
- Memorial Drive (Chicopee, Massachusetts)
- Memorial Drive (Houston), Texas
- Memorial Drive (St. Louis), Missouri
- Memorial Drive (Tulsa), Oklahoma

== Places ==
- Memorial Drive Park, a tennis complex in Adelaide, South Australia
