= Mount Pleasant, St. Louis =

Neighborhood of St. Louis in Missouri, US

Coordinates: 38.5746°N 90.2379°W

Mount Pleasant
- Neighborhood of St. Louis
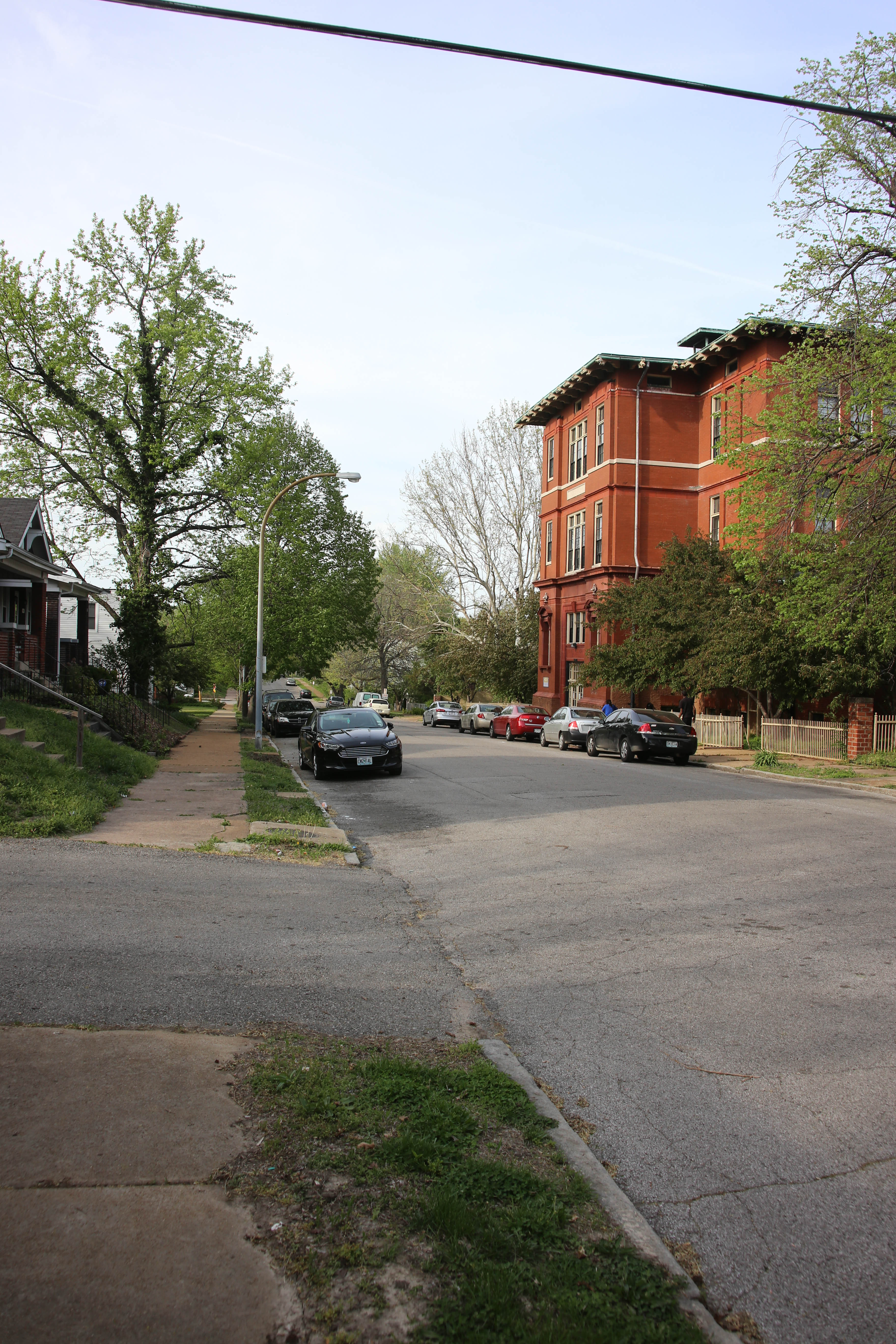
- Mount Pleasant houses and school, April 2017

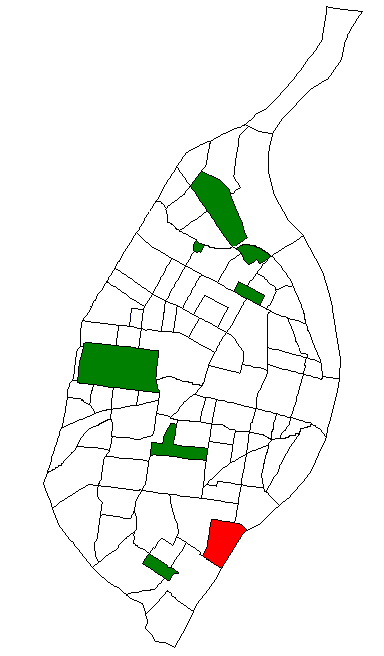
- Location (red) of Mount Pleasant within St. Louis
- Country: United States
- State: Missouri
- City: St. Louis
- Wards: 3, 8

Government
  - Aldermen: Shane Cohn, Jami Cox Antwi

Area
  - Total: 0.60 sq mi (1.6 km^{2})

Population (2020)
  - Total: 4,376
  - Density: 7,300/sq mi (2,800/km^{2})
- ZIP code(s): Part of 63111
- Area code(s): 314
- Website: stlouis-mo.gov

Mount Pleasant is a neighborhood of St. Louis, Missouri. The neighborhood's boundaries are defined by Compton Avenue on the west, the Mississippi River on the east, Meramec Street on the north, and Eichelberger Street on the south. The Mount Pleasant neighborhood is home to several landmarks, most notably St. Anthony of Padua Church and Mount Pleasant Park. Mount Pleasant Park is a major attraction to the neighborhood. It features a unique outdoor roller hockey rink in the southwest corner in addition to various standard playground equipment.

Maryville University was founded in the neighborhood in 1872 and remained until 1961 when it moved to Town and Country. Its landmark Duchesne Hall towered over the neighborhood until being torn down in 1973 after a fire and being replaced by the Maryville Gardens Post Office station and Maryville Gardens apartment complex.

== Demographics ==
Historical population
Census	Pop.	Note	%±
1990	5,144		—
2000	4,889		−5.0%
2010	4,408		−9.8%
2020	4,376		−0.7%

In 2020 Mount Pleasant's racial makeup was 46.7% Black, 36.3% White, 0.6% Native American, 2.1% Asian, 7.8% Two or More Races, and 6.5% Some Other Race. 10.6% of the people were of Hispanic or Latino origin.
