= Memorial Drive (St. Louis) =

Street in St. Louis

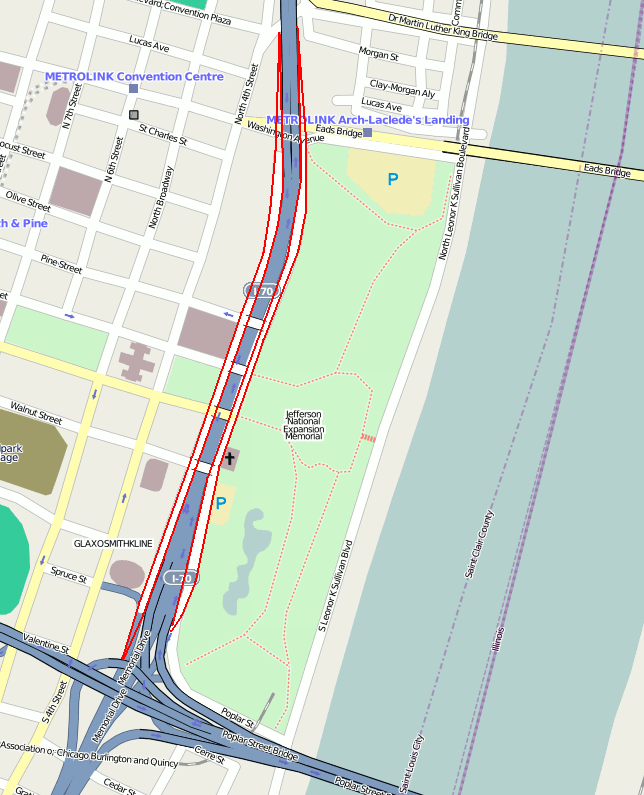
- Memorial Drive outlined in red runs by the Arch Grounds on both sides of I-44
- Owner: City of St. Louis
- Maintained by: St. Louis City Street Department
- Location: Downtown St. Louis, Missouri, United States
- Nearest metro station: Laclede's Landing
- South end: I-44 / Poplar Street
- North end: Morgan Street

Memorial Drive runs north–south in Downtown St. Louis, Missouri, United States. It is between the city's central business district and the grounds of the Gateway Arch and Gateway Arch National Park. It has an intimate relationship with Interstate 44 (formerly Interstate 70); for most of its length, it runs above the sunken highway, but north of Washington Avenue it goes under it as the highway ramps up above the city.

For years, Memorial Drive was a source of connection problems between the Gateway Mall and the Arch Grounds. Imagined by the winners of the 2009 international design competition, Framing a Modern Masterpiece, Michael Van Valkenburgh Associates corrected this issue by designing a "lid" to be placed over the depressed highway with a landscaped plaza acting as a median. The park over the highway was completed in November 2015 as the first component of the CityArchRiver project.

== History ==
In the 1930s, work began on Gateway Arch National Park (which was then known as Jefferson National Expansion Memorial) and the section of 3rd Street running along the western border of the memorial was renamed. The memorial construction continued until 1965 when the Gateway Arch was completed. In the years that followed, Memorial Drive was slowly integrated into the then-Interstate 70, which opened in 1970.

In the years that followed, citizens and urbanists complained of the city being cut off from the memorial by the highway and Memorial Drive. Various calls were made for placing a lid over the sunken highway, and designs were drawn up by the large, locally based firm HOK. The Missouri Department of Transportation did several studies to research the impact of closing the road and diverting traffic along other routes. So far, nothing has happened, but in 2009, MoDOT applied for stimulus funds for repairs on Memorial Drive which would keep it more or less as it is. In December 2009, the National Park Service announced an international competition to improve the memorial and has included Memorial Drive in its plans.

The Stan Musial Veterans Memorial Bridge which opened in 2014, rerouted I-70 north of downtown, and its former route through downtown and under Memorial Drive was redesignated as I-44.

== Gallery ==
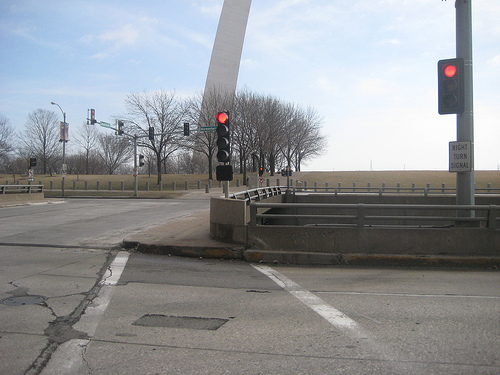

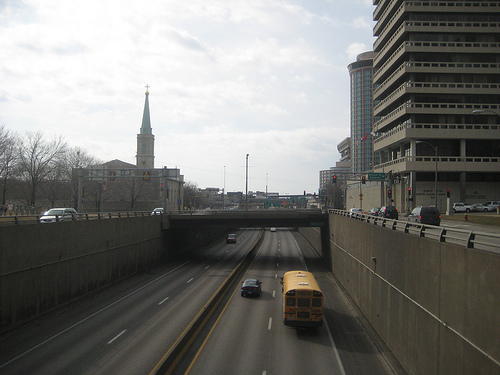

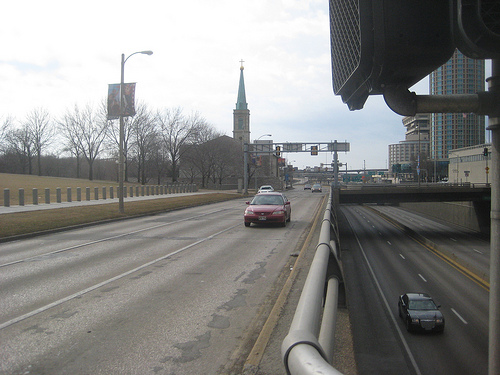

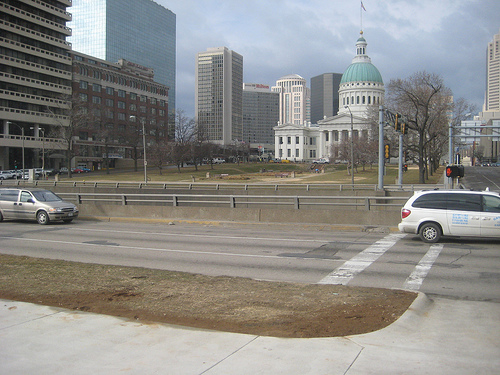

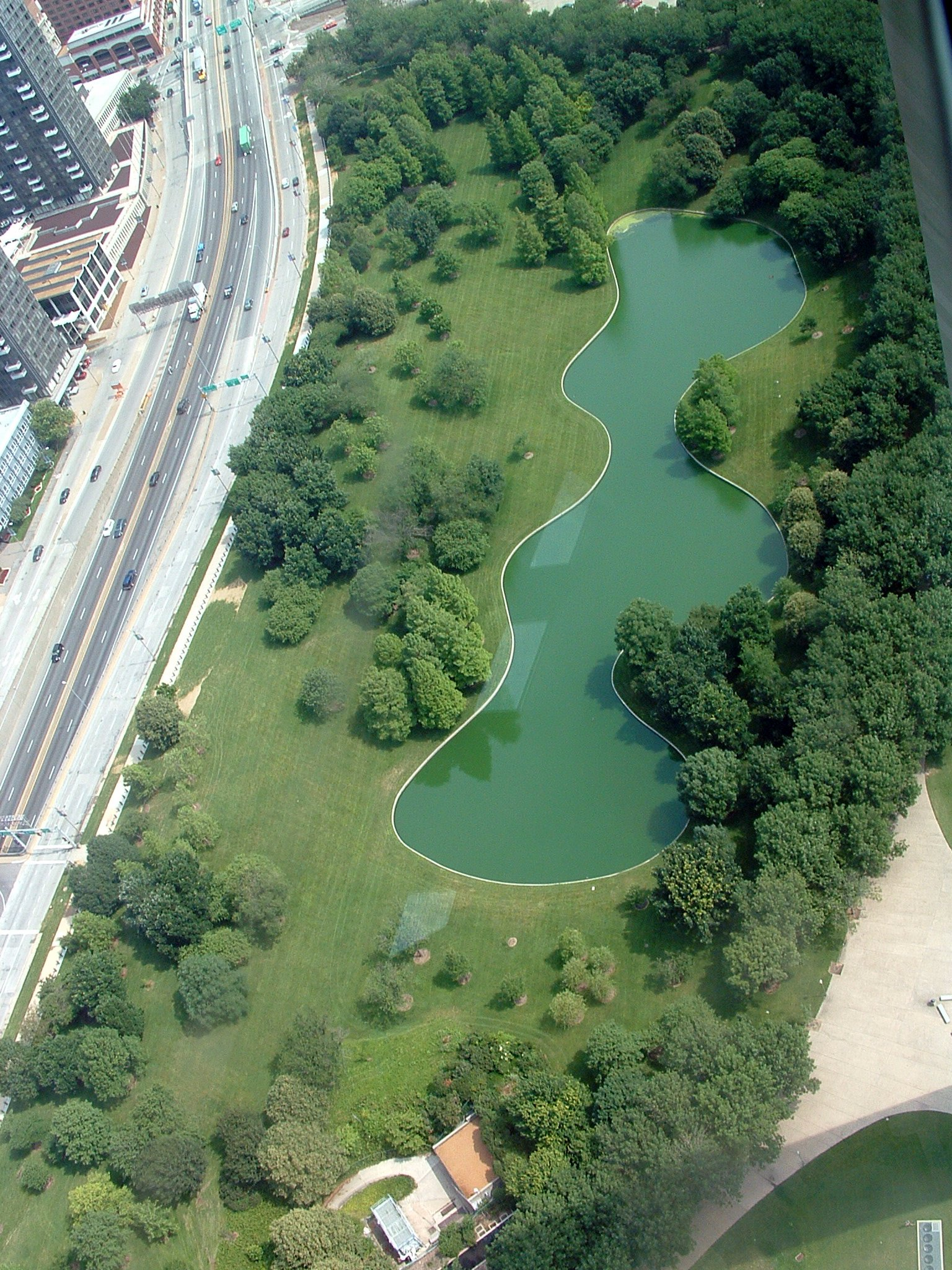

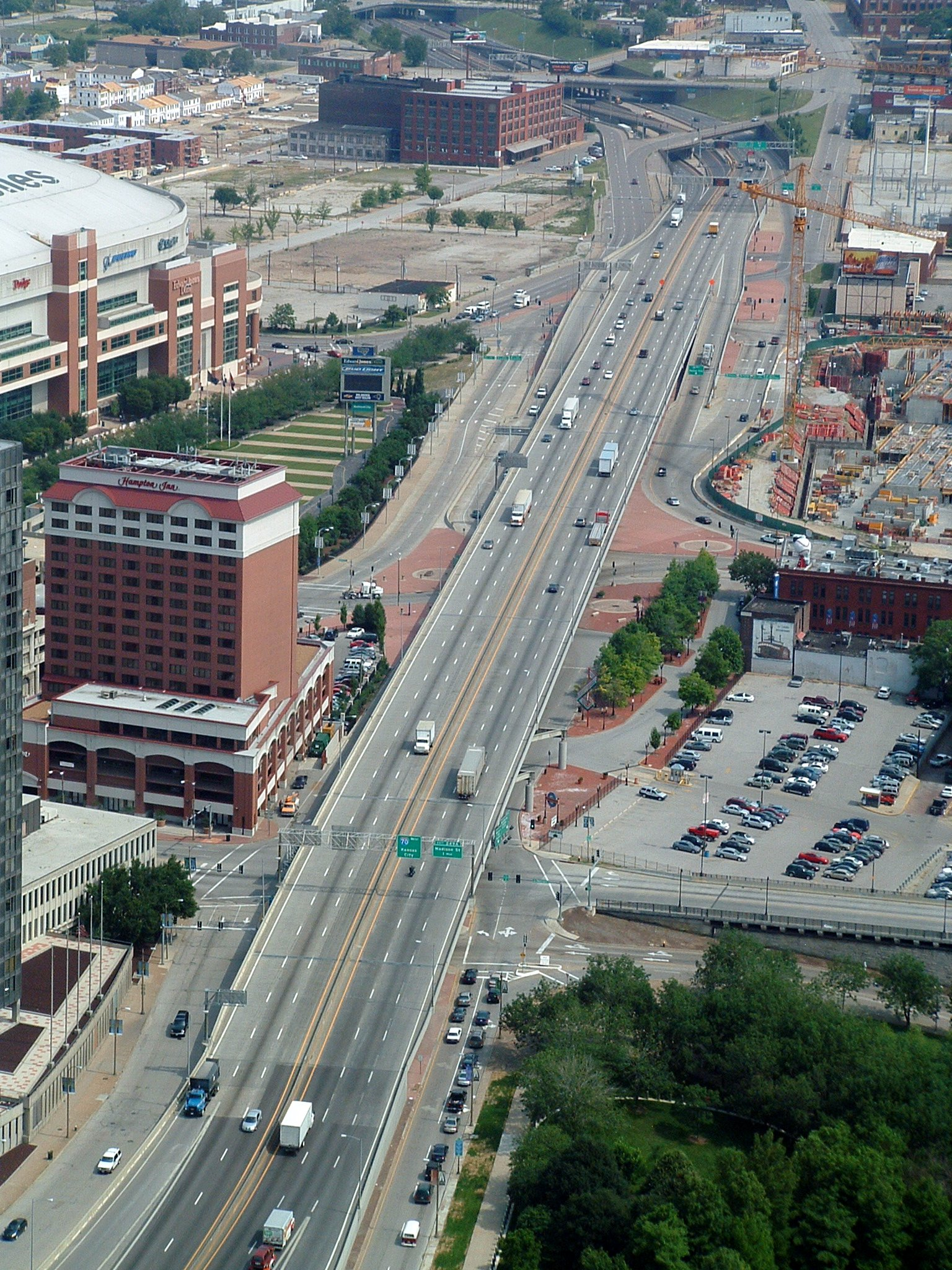
