= Downtown St. Louis =

Neighborhood of St. Louis, Missouri, US

Coordinates: 38.6260°N 90.1922°W

Downtown
- Neighborhood
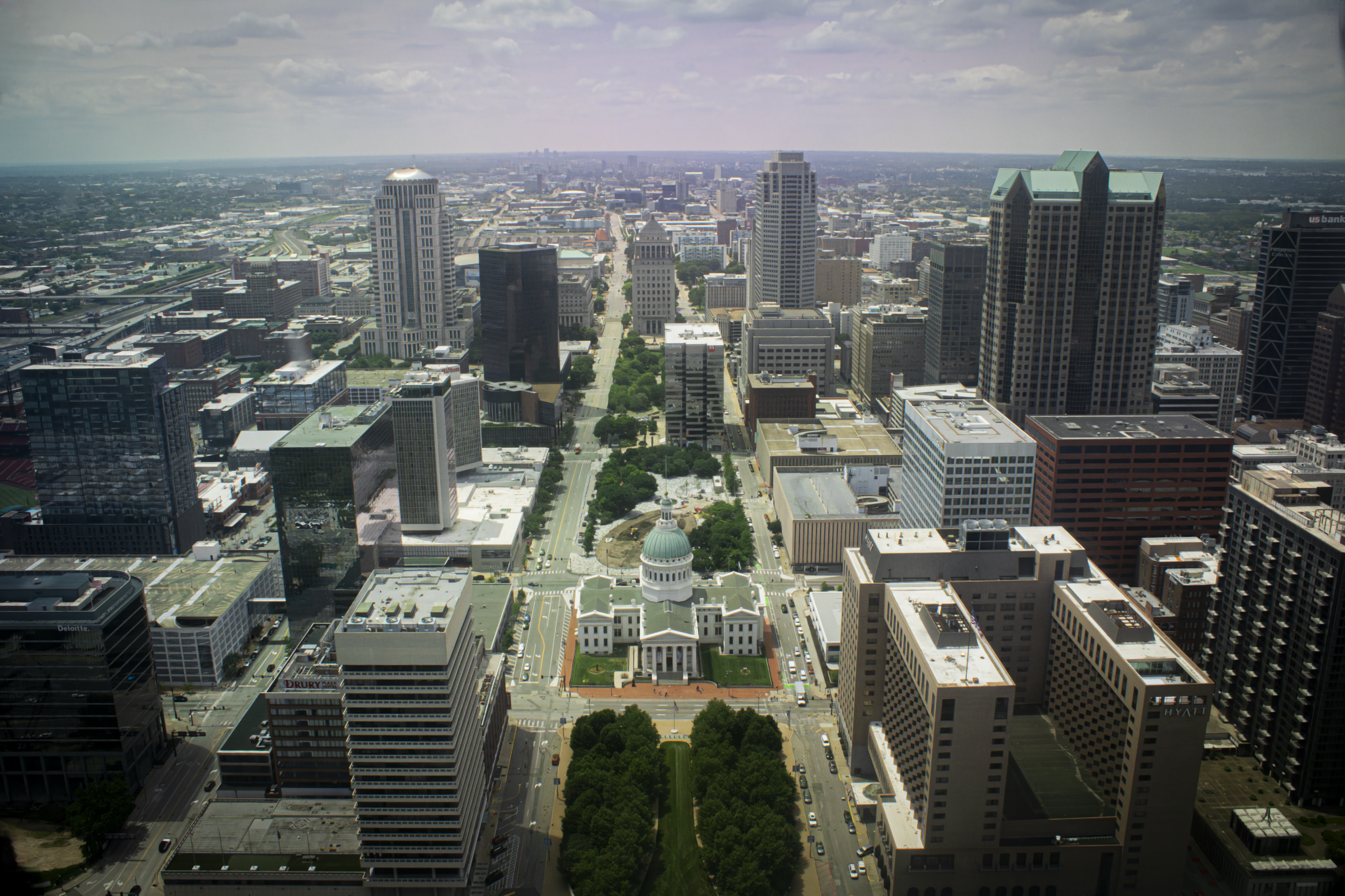
- Downtown St. Louis photographed from atop the Gateway Arch observation deck in 2026

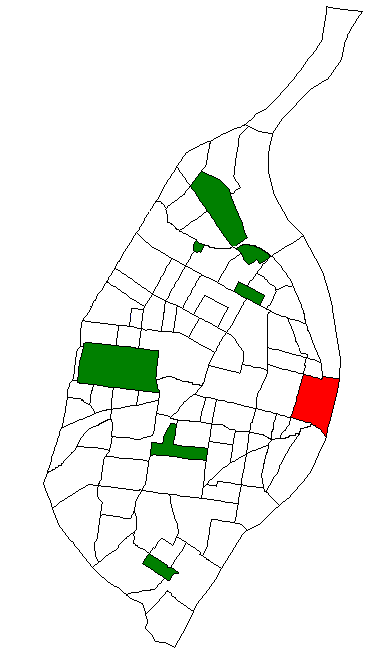
- Location (red) of Downtown within St. Louis
- Country: United States
- State: Missouri
- City: St. Louis
- Wards: 8, 14

Government
  - Aldermen: Jami Cox Antwi, Rasheen Aldridge

Area
  - Total: 1.01 sq mi (2.6 km^{2})

Population (2020)
  - Total: 5,442
  - Density: 5,390/sq mi (2,080/km^{2})
- ZIP code(s): Parts of 63101, 63102
- Area code(s): 314
- Website: stlouis-mo.gov

Downtown St. Louis is the central business district of St. Louis, Missouri, the hub of tourism and entertainment, and the anchor of the St. Louis metropolitan area. The downtown is bounded by Cole Street to the north, the river front to the east, Chouteau Avenue to the south, and Tucker Boulevard to the west. (If the neighborhood defined by the city as Downtown West, St. Louis, is included, however, then it extends further west to Jefferson Avenue.) The downtown is the site of many corporate headquarters, including Stifel Financial Corp., HOK, Spire Inc, and a host of other companies. Downtown is also the site of Busch Stadium, the Dome at America's Center, Gateway Arch National Park, Basilica of St. Louis, King of France, as well as several other notable cultural centers.

== History ==
The founding history of the downtown area of St. Louis relates to the founding of the city. Pierre Laclede chose to found the city on the bluffs because it had access to the river for trade and transportation, was above most floods and defensible against hostile Native Americans. Laclede found the present-day downtown area the perfect place to run a bustling fur trade with the Native Americans of the region.

In the community's early days, Laclede acted as the de facto leader of St. Louis. While the settlement was named after King Louis IX of France, most residents called it "Laclede Village." Laclede planned the format of the city streets, and oversaw the construction of the settlement's first buildings. Although initial growth was slow, the settlement received a stimulus when France surrendered all of its territorial holdings east of the Mississippi River to Great Britain after the Seven Years' War. Many French colonists moved from east of the Mississippi River to St. Louis to escape British rule. By 1776 St. Louis had 300 residents and almost 75 buildings. By 1804 the population had tripled to 900, yet the village was still without a local government. After the Louisiana Purchase of 1803, a flood of immigrants from the United States came to the village. As the newcomers established an American system of government, French influence and use of the French language began to wane, but the leading French colonial mercantile families continued to have power.

With the arrival of the steamboat in 1817, St. Louis became a vital center of American commerce, able to trade goods from the Gulf of Mexico across the country through the great river system connected by the Mississippi River. By 1836 the city had 15,000 inhabitants, but it did not have basic institutions, such as banks, libraries or public schools. The downtown streets were being renamed after prominent American settlers. By the mid-19th century, the area was becoming more commercial than residential, and more people began to live in the western parts of the city. The commercial activity of St. Louis was centered on Main Street (present-day First Street), Washington Avenue, and Walnut Street. The St. Louis Fire of 1849 destroyed much of this district. In time the city recovered from the fire and regained its place as one of the commercial centers of the Midwest.

During the late 19th and early 20th centuries, the St. Louis downtown experienced a building boom, largely because of a lack of room for businesses to expand. In its heyday, the downtown was a bustling center of commerce. By the mid-20th century, the downtown area began to decline as businesses moved west and to the suburbs, and industries restructured. During the 1970s, owners razed dozens of historic buildings and replaced them with parking lots. Also, in 2004, the historic St. Louis Century Building was demolished to create a parking deck. The present-day downtown has moved further south, yet the Historic Downtown remains. Recent preservation efforts have heightened awareness of the architectural significance of the area.

Both major universities in St. Louis began in the downtown region. Saint Louis University was founded in 1818 by Bishop DuBourg, who rented a stone house on Market Street to house its first class. The university was discontinued in 1826 because of Bishop DuBourg's pastoral duties, but the institution was rejuvenated two years later by Father Van Quickenborne. The university expanded greatly, constructing numerous buildings. The university moved to its present location in 1888.

Washington University was founded as Eliot Seminary on February 22, 1853. It received its present name in 1857 at the insistence of its chancellor, William Greenleaf Eliot, as it was chartered on George Washington's birthday. The first school opened on its downtown campus at 17th Street and Washington Avenue was the Smith Academy in 1856. This original building was soon followed by the buildings for other departments. Like Saint Louis University, Washington University in St. Louis relocated from the downtown area, in 1904 moving to its present campus to the west.

After the 1950s, St. Louis, like many other American industrial cities, suffered from industry restructuring, loss of jobs, and demographic changes accompanying suburbanization following highway construction. It has had economic decline and heavy population losses, with rising rates of poverty and crime. Since the early 1990s, the city has directed urban renewal efforts in the downtown area, with greatly increased investment. Over $4 billion was invested downtown between 1999 and 2006. Recently, the population has grown for the first time in 40 years, and numerous residential and commercial units are being built.

== Government and infrastructure ==
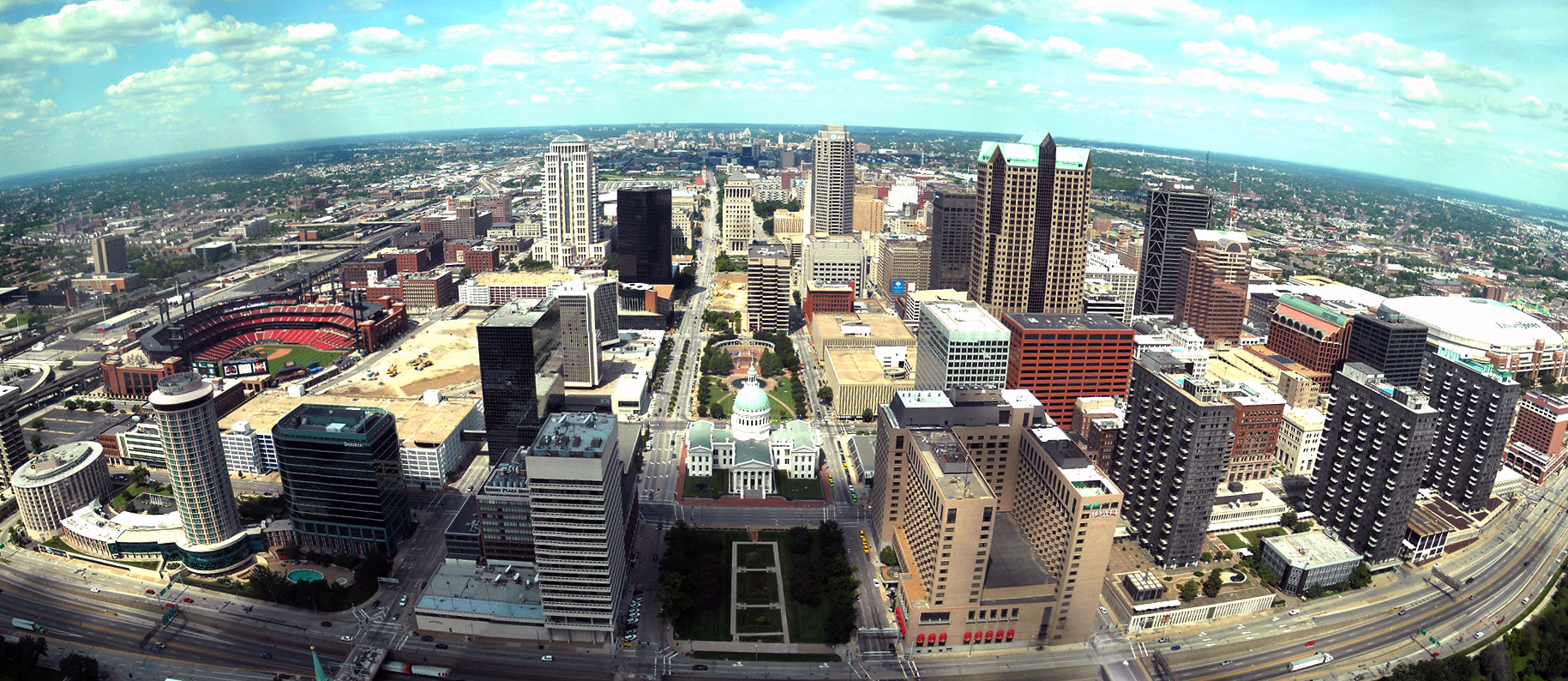
Panoramic image of downtown St. Louis, photographed from the Gateway Arch observation area

The United States Postal Service operates the St. Louis Main Post Office at 1720 Market Street in Downtown St. Louis. Also located in the downtown neighborhood, the St. Louis City Hall at 1200 Market Street.

St. Louis MetroLink Blue and Red light rail lines service downtown with the Stadium, 8th & Pine, Convention Center, and Laclede's Landing stations.

== Economy ==
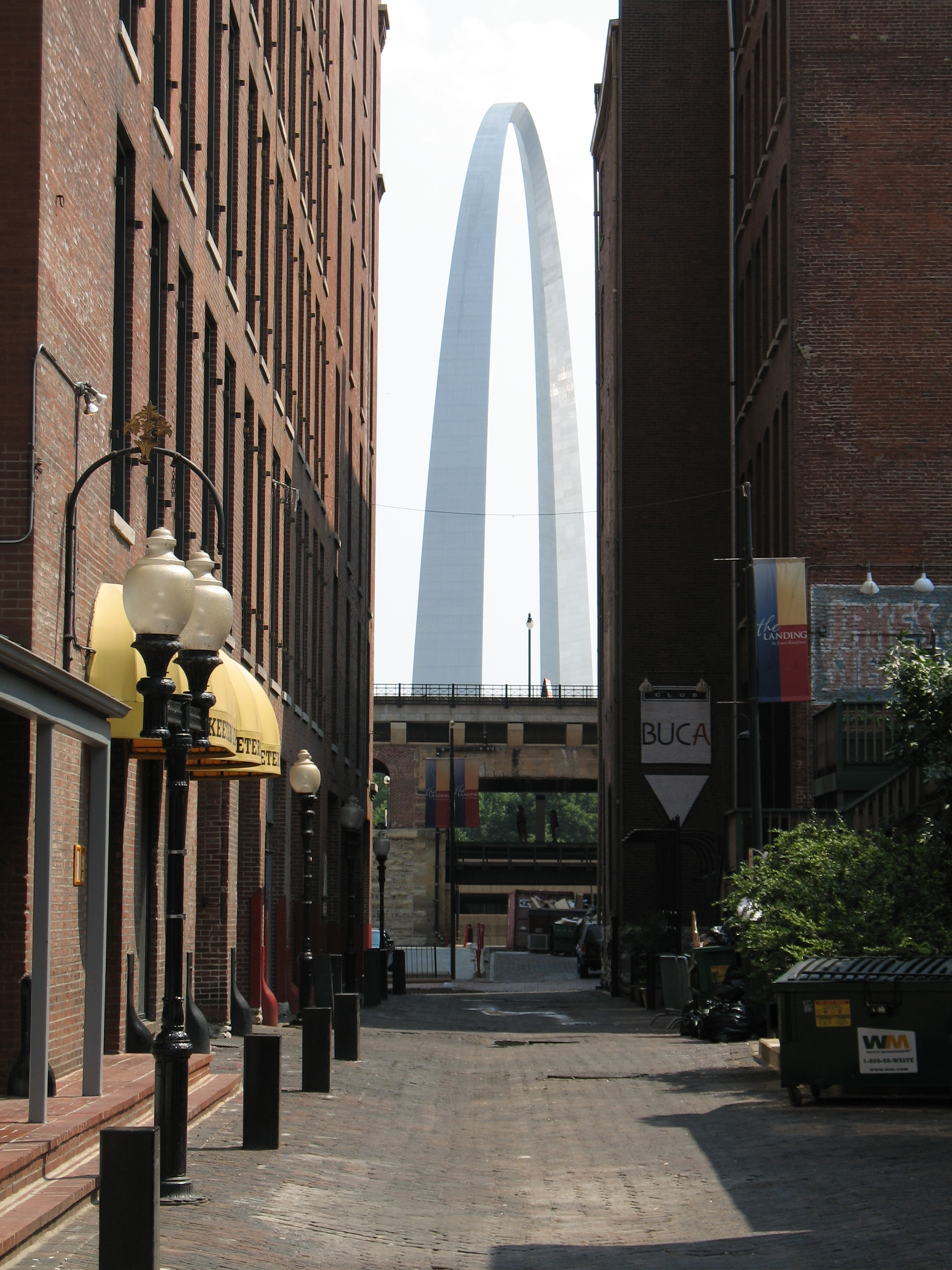
The Gateway Arch from Laclede's Landing

Nestlé Purina PetCare, Peabody Energy Corporation, HOK, and Spire Inc. are headquartered in Downtown St. Louis. Ralcorp and its former subsidiary Post Foods have their headquarters in the Bank of America Plaza in Downtown St. Louis.

In 1999, prior to its merger with American Airlines, Trans World Airlines was headquartered in One City Centre at 515 North 6th Street. In 2006, John Steffen, owner of One City Centre, announced that he planned to redevelop it into a mixed-use building called 600 Washington. Prior to a 2005 merger with Federated Department Stores, May Department Stores was headquartered in Downtown.

Downtown St. Louis remains the region's financial services hub with the headquarters of Stifel, Anders CPA, the regional headquarters of PwC, KPMG, and Deloitte. U.S. Bancorp maintains a corporate headquarters downtown and in 2025 moved its subsidiary Impact Finance to the U.S. Bank tower. Additionally, the Federal Reserve Bank of St. Louis, a regional Federal Reserve Bank covering the 8th district of the Federal Reserve System, is located at 411 Locust Street at its terminus with North Broadway.

With respect to the legal field, Downtown St. Louis remains the regional anchor for law firms, with major white shoe law firms Thompson Coburn, Bryan Cave Leighton Paisner, and Lewis Rice, among others, headquartered Downtown. The Thomas F. Eagleton United States Courthouse houses the U.S. attorney's office for the Eastern District of Missouri, the United States Court of Appeals for the Eighth Circuit, and the United States District Court for the Eastern District of Missouri. The Missouri Court of Appeals for the Eastern District is located Downtown as are the Circuit Court for the City of St. Louis. The United States District Court for the Southern District of Illinois is located just across the Mississippi River from downtown, less than a 10 minute drive from Downtown, which makes Downtown uniquely situated for litigation in multiple federal jurisdictions.

== Education ==
St. Louis Public Schools has its headquarters in Downtown St. Louis. The St. Louis University School of Law (SLU LAW) moved from the main SLU campus in Midtown to a new facility on North Tucker Boulevard during the summer of 2013. In 2015, Webster Groves-based Webster University opened a downtown campus on Olive Street.

== Demographics ==
Historical population
Year	Pop.	±%
1990	1,152	—
2000	806	−30.0%
2010	3,721	+361.7%
2020	5,442	+46.3%

In 2020 Downtown's racial makeup was 43.3% White, 44.2% Black, 0.3% Native American, 4.4% Asian, 5.6% Two or More Races, and 2.1% Some Other Race. 4.9% of the people were of Hispanic or Latino origin.

Racial composition	1990	2000	2010	2020
White	66.2%	64.3%	53.5%	43.3%
Black or African American	32.3%	28.2%	37.1%	44.2%
Hispanic or Latino (of any race)		1.9%	2.9%	4.9%
Asian		3.7%	5.4%	4.4%

== See also ==
- Laclede's Landing, St. Louis
- List of tallest buildings in St. Louis
- Downtown West, St. Louis
- National Register of Historic Places listings in Downtown and Downtown West St. Louis
