= Laclede's Landing station =

Light rail station in St. Louis, Missouri, US

Laclede's Landing
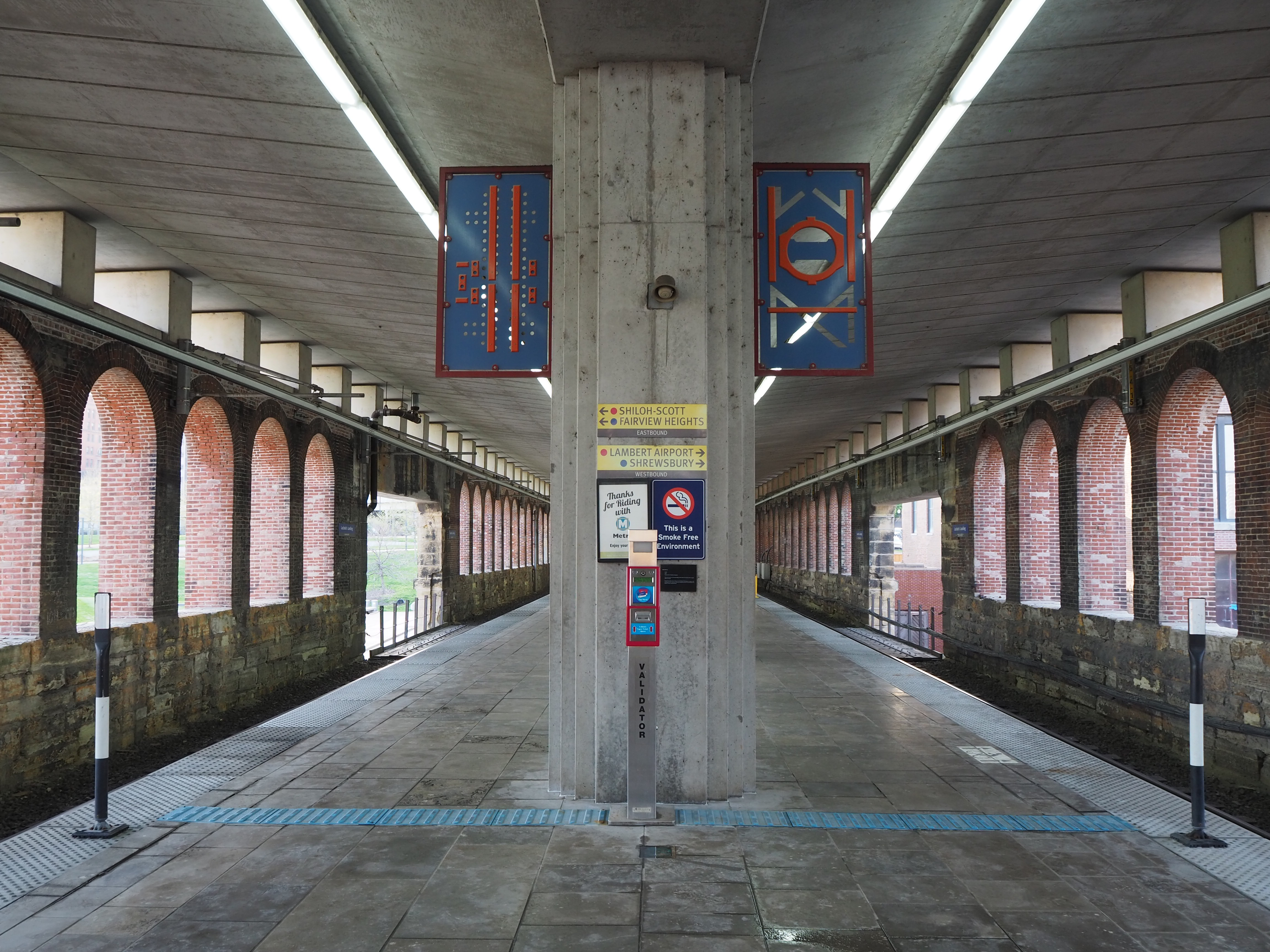
- Laclede's Landing station platform

General information
- Location: 200 Washington Avenue; St. Louis, Missouri
- Coordinates: 38.629473°N 90.184108°W
- Owner: Bi-State Development
- Operator: Metro Transit
- Platforms: 1 island platform
- Tracks: 2

Construction
- Structure type: Elevated
- Cycle facilities: Riverfront Trail
- Accessible: Yes

History
- Opened: July 31, 1993
- Former names: Arch-Laclede's Landing

Passengers
- 2018: 563 daily
- Rank: 26 out of 38

Services
Preceding station	MetroLink	Following station
Convention Center toward Shrewsbury–Lansdowne I-44	Blue Line	East Riverfront toward Fairview Heights
Convention Center toward Lambert Airport Terminal 1	Red Line	East Riverfront toward Shiloh–Scott
Location

Laclede's Landing station is a light rail station on the Red and Blue lines of the St. Louis MetroLink system. This elevated station is located in downtown St. Louis near Laclede's Landing.

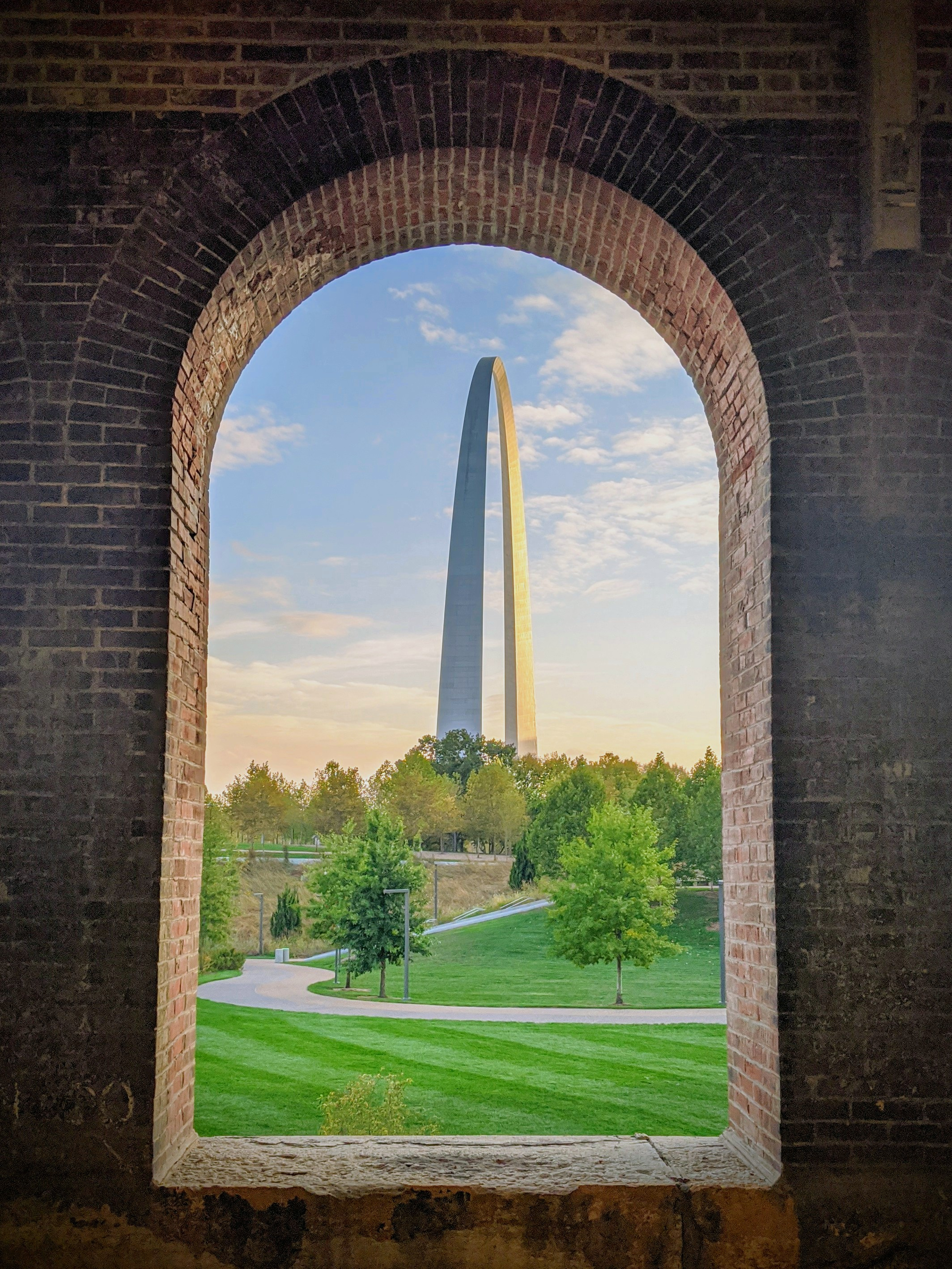
The Gateway Arch seen from Laclede's Landing

The station is known for its historic brickwork that frames the Gateway Arch from the platform level.

== History ==
Laclede's Landing is the easternmost station in Missouri. It is located on the lower deck of the Eads Bridge before crossing the Mississippi River into Illinois.

The station sits at the east portal of the historic Downtown Tunnel, constructed in 1874 to carry trains between the Eads Bridge and the Mill Creek Valley rail yards. The tunnel closed after a final Amtrak train passed through in 1974. Rehabilitation began in 1991 in preparation for the opening of MetroLink in 1993, which now uses the tunnel to connect communities in Illinois and Missouri via downtown St. Louis.

== Station layout ==
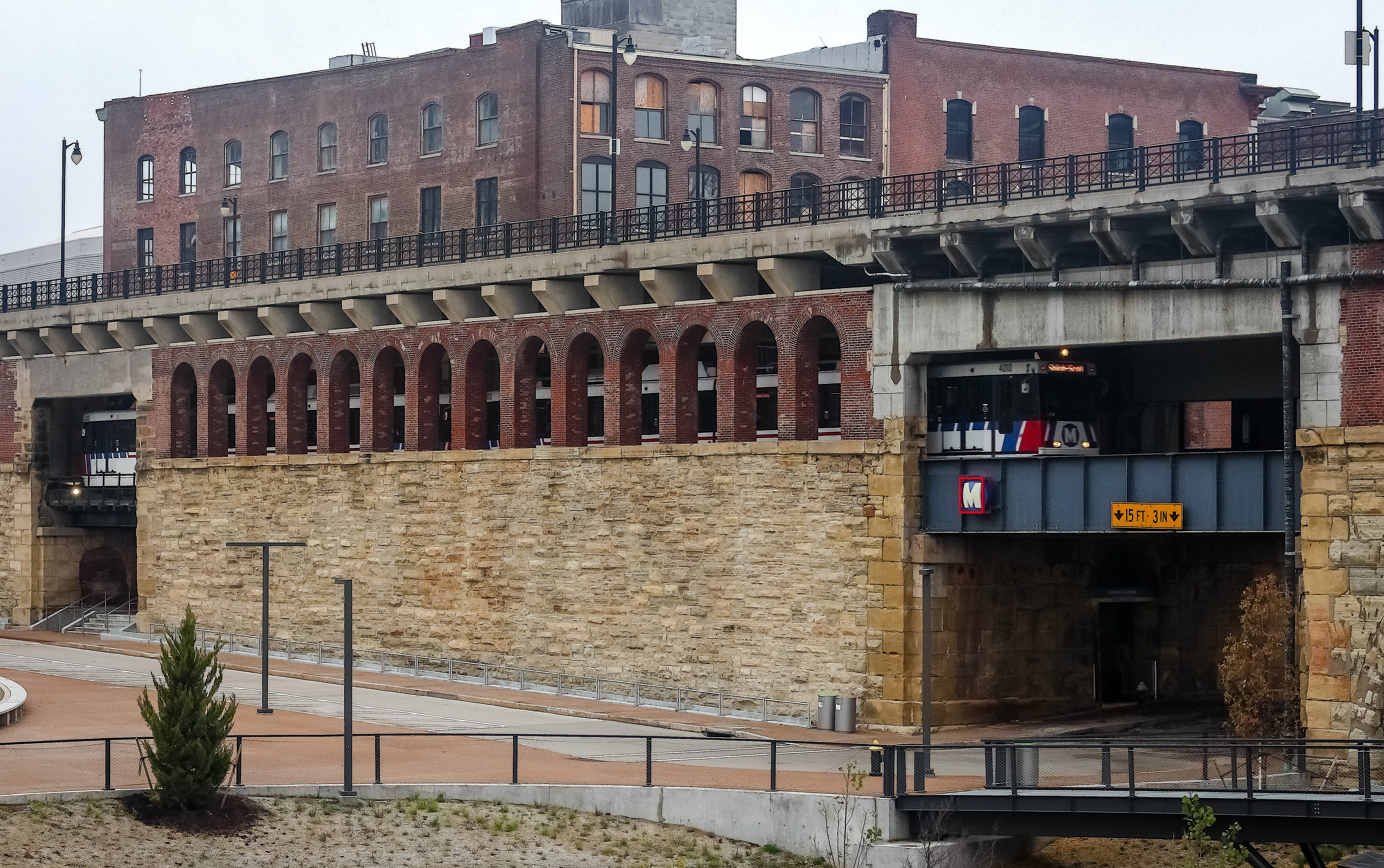
Station exterior in 2016

The station consists of a single island platform with entrances on either end: one on Rue de L'Eglise (2nd Street) at the west end, with stairs and an elevator, and one on 1st Street at the east end, with only stairs.

== Public artwork ==
In 2013, Metro's Arts in Transit program commissioned the work Build by Beliz Brother for this station. The aluminum panels are meant to represent the drawings James Eads used to construct his namesake bridge.

== Notable places nearby ==
Gateway Arch National Park recommends visitors accessing the park via public transportation use this station or the 8th & Pine station. Other nearby places of note include:

- Four Seasons Hotel St. Louis
- Horseshoe St. Louis
- Laclede's Landing
- Mississippi River
- St. Louis Riverfront Trail
