= Meeting-of-the-Waters =

Historic house in Tennessee, United States

- U.S. National Register of Historic Places
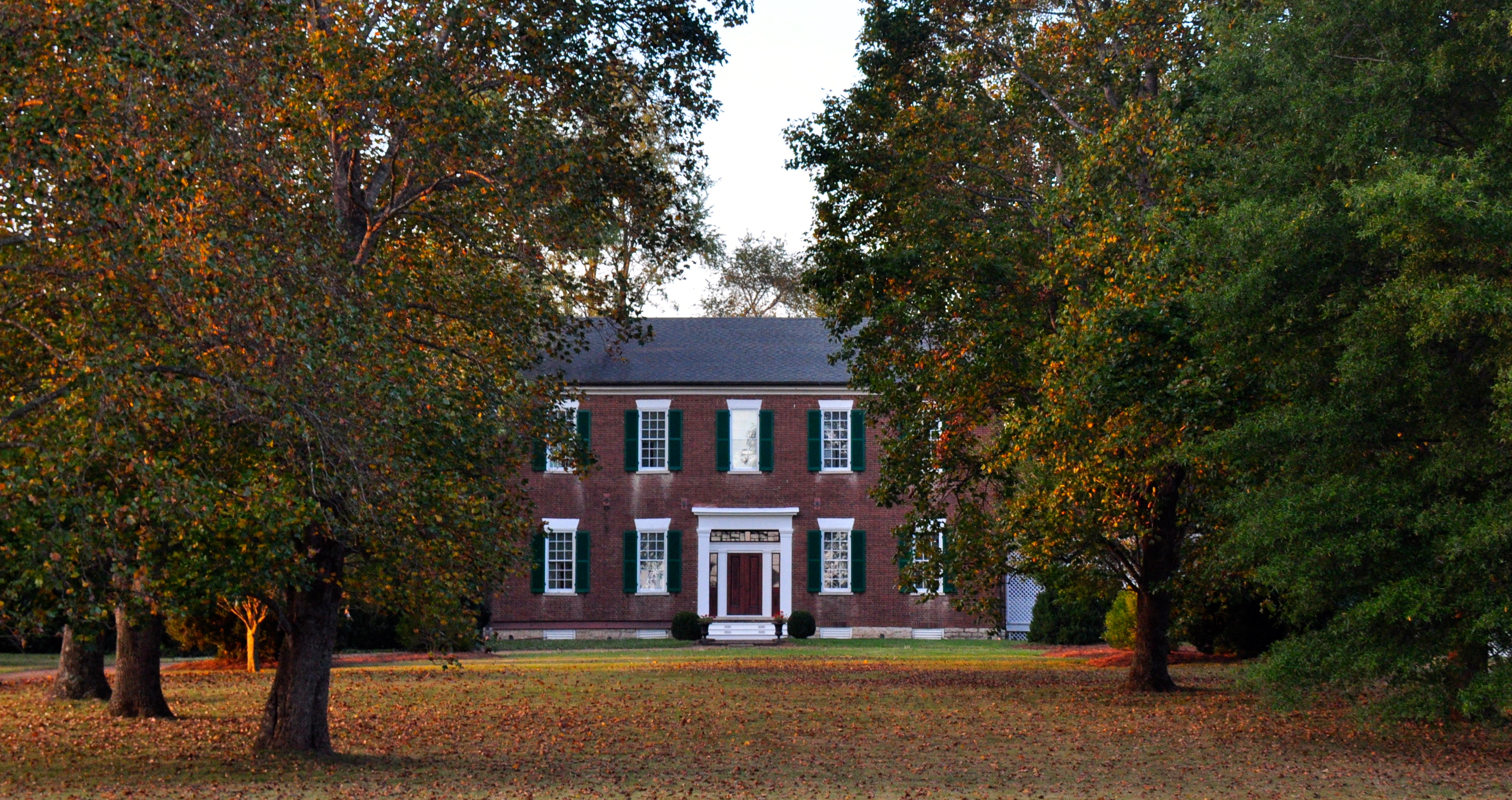
- Meeting-of-the-Waters, September 2014.

- Location within Tennessee Location within the United States
- Location: NW of Franklin on Del Rio Pike, Franklin, Tennessee
- Coordinates: 35°58′11″N 86°55′12″W
- Area: 18.14 acres (7.34 ha)
- Built: 1800-1809
- Architect: Perkins, Thomas Hardin
- Architectural style: Federal
- NRHP reference No.: 82004072
- Added to NRHP: August 26, 1982

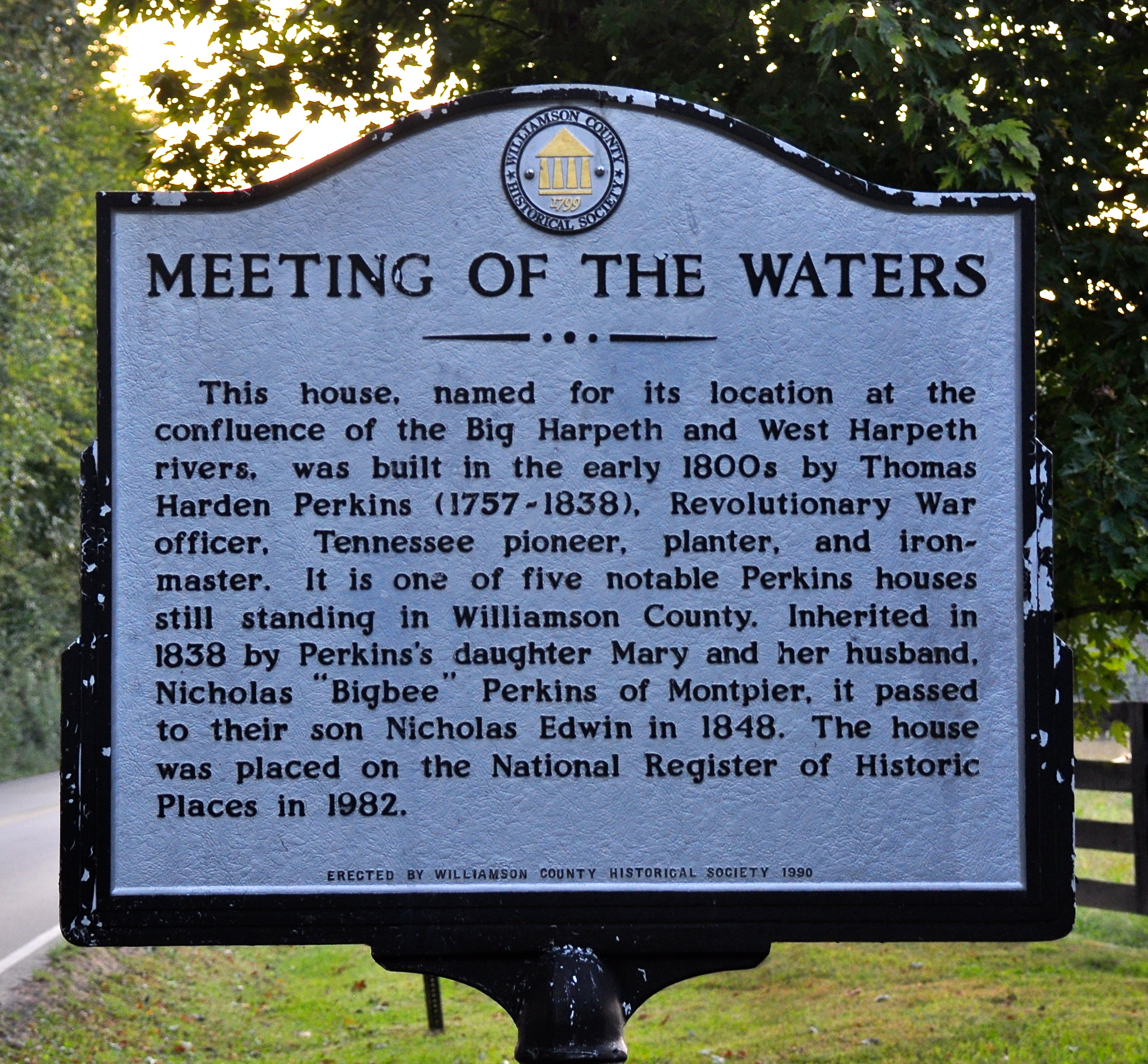
Williamson County Historical Society Marker for Meeting-of-the-Waters.

Meeting-of-the-Waters is a two-story brick home and property in Franklin, Tennessee that dates from 1800 and was listed on the National Register of Historic Places in 1982. It has also been known as the Thomas Hardin Perkins House.

== Construction ==
It was built by Thomas Hardin Perkins, who settled in Williamson County in 1800 and began building this home at the joining of the Big Harpeth River and the West Harpeth River. It was completed c.1810 and "was one of the finest homes built in the county before 1830". It included Federal style detailing and is one of the oldest brick residences surviving in the county.

== Other Buildings ==
Two other historic Williamson County houses were built by relative Nicholas Tate Perkins:

- "Two Rivers", built by relative Nicholas Tate Perkins, a Williamson County designated historic resource
- "River Grange", built c.1825 for his daughter, also a Williamson County designated historic resource
