= Kosciusko, St. Louis =

Neighborhood of St. Louis in Missouri, US

Coordinates: 38.6031°N 90.1993°W

Kosciusko
- Neighborhood of St. Louis
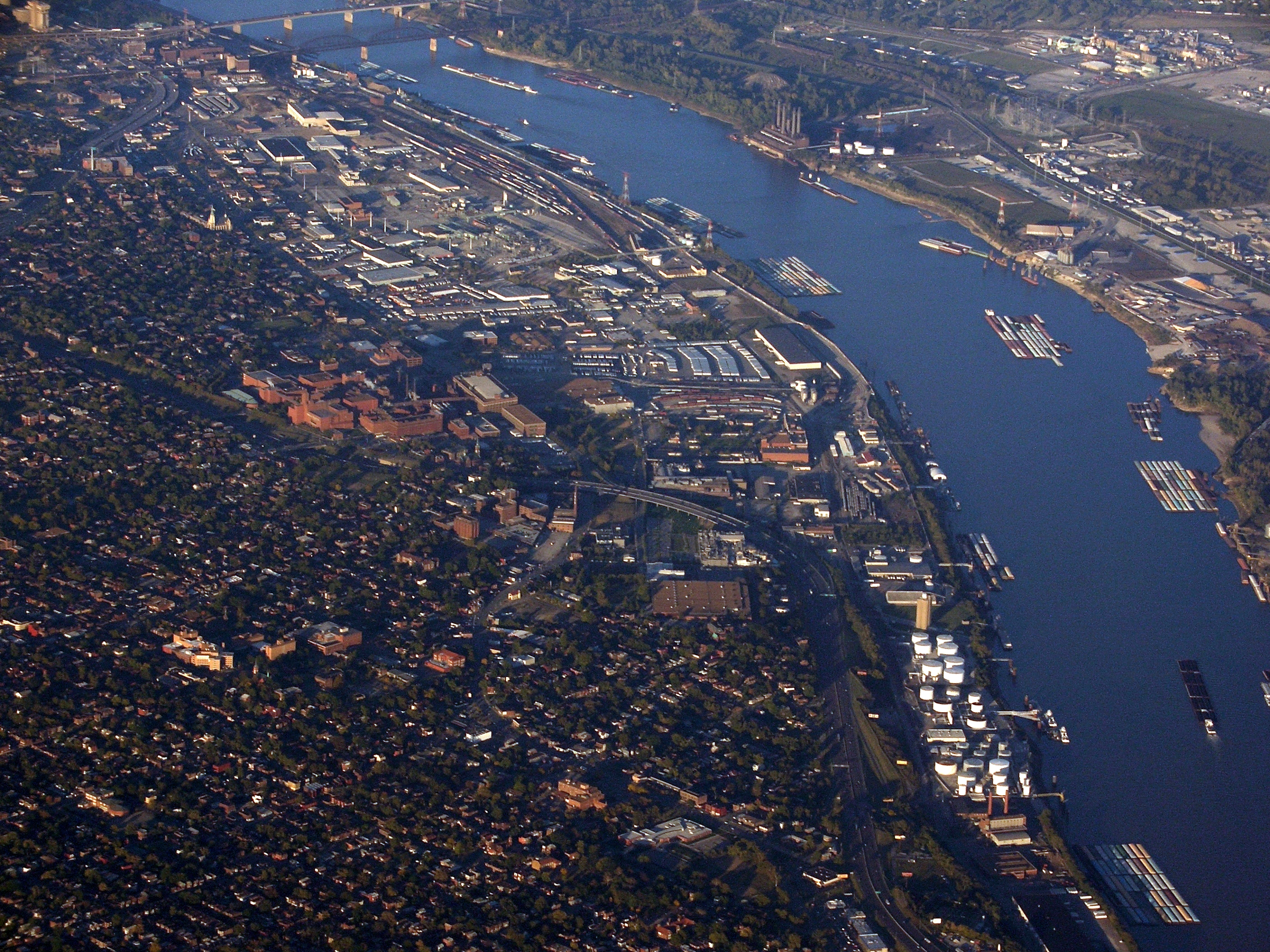
- Barge traffic along the industrial riverfront, October 2006

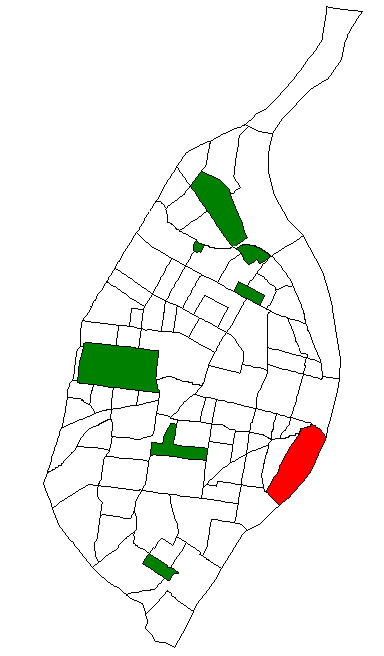
- Location (red) of Kosciusko within St. Louis
- Country: United States
- State: Missouri
- City: St. Louis
- Ward: 8

Government
  - Aldermen: Jami Cox Antwi

Area
  - Total: 1.13 sq mi (2.9 km^{2})

Population (2020)
  - Total: 52
  - Density: 46/sq mi (18/km^{2})
- ZIP code(s): Parts of 63104, 63118
- Area code(s): 314
- Website: stlouis-mo.gov

Kosciusko (/kʌˈʃuskoʊ/ kuh-SHOOS-koh) is a mostly non-residential neighborhood located in St. Louis, Missouri. It begins at the Mississippi River front in the east and goes up to 7th Boulevard and 8th Street in the west. Interstate 55 is a northern border, and St. George and Dorcas Streets border the south of this neighborhood. Kosciusko is named in honor of Tadeusz Kościuszko, an American Revolutionary War general of Polish descent.

Within its limits are several industrial companies, including the Nooter Corporation. The longest continuous graffiti wall, the 1.9 Mile Mississippi River Floodwall, is in this neighborhood. It is home to the annual Labor Day event, Paint Louis. In the northern edge of the neighborhood is an area commonly called "Chouteau's Landing."

== Schooling ==
The first independent charter middle school in the city is located in the neighborhood, as well. Lift for Life Academy, which opened in 2000, offers education for Grades K – 12.

== Lyon Park ==
The City of Saint Louis maintains one city park within the Kosciusko boundaries: Lyon Park, named after Union Civil War General Nathaniel Lyon. It houses two softball fields, an asphalt walking trail, and both a monument to General Lyon (sculpted by Adolphus Druiding) and a statue of his likeness created by artist Charles Steubenraugh. Lyon Park is bounded by South Broadway, South Second Street, Utah Street, and Arsenal Street.

== History ==
Prior to urban renewal projects in the 1960s, Kosciusko was home to European immigrant communities living in 19th century Greek Revival rowhouses. These houses, as well as buildings from local businesses John J. Roe & Co. pork packing plant (built in 1859) which supplied meat to Union soldiers, Phoenix Musical Club, and People's Savings Institution Bank Building were demolished in slum clearance. Among the surviving buildings is the historic St. Mary of Victories Church.

The northern area of the neighborhood includes an area that has been branded "Chouteau's Landing" or "Gateway South" which has been reinvisioned by a number proposed redevelopment projects due to the proximity to the Gateway Arch and Downtown St. Louis. Historic buildings from the Crunden-Martin Manufacturing Company, constructed between 1904 and 1920, have survived deterioration and fires, including a five-alarm fire in November 2025.

== Demographics ==
With a population of 52 in 2020, Kosciusko's racial makeup was 38.5% White, 30.8% Black, 0% Asian, 0% American Indian, 1.9% Pacific Islander, 26.9% Two or more races with 15.4% being of Hispanic origin.

Historical population
Census	Pop.	Note	%±
1990	0		—
2010	14		—
2020	52		271.4%
