= Carr Square, St. Louis =

Neighborhood of St. Louis in Missouri, US

Coordinates: 38.6395°N 90.2024°W

Carr Square
- Neighborhood of St. Louis
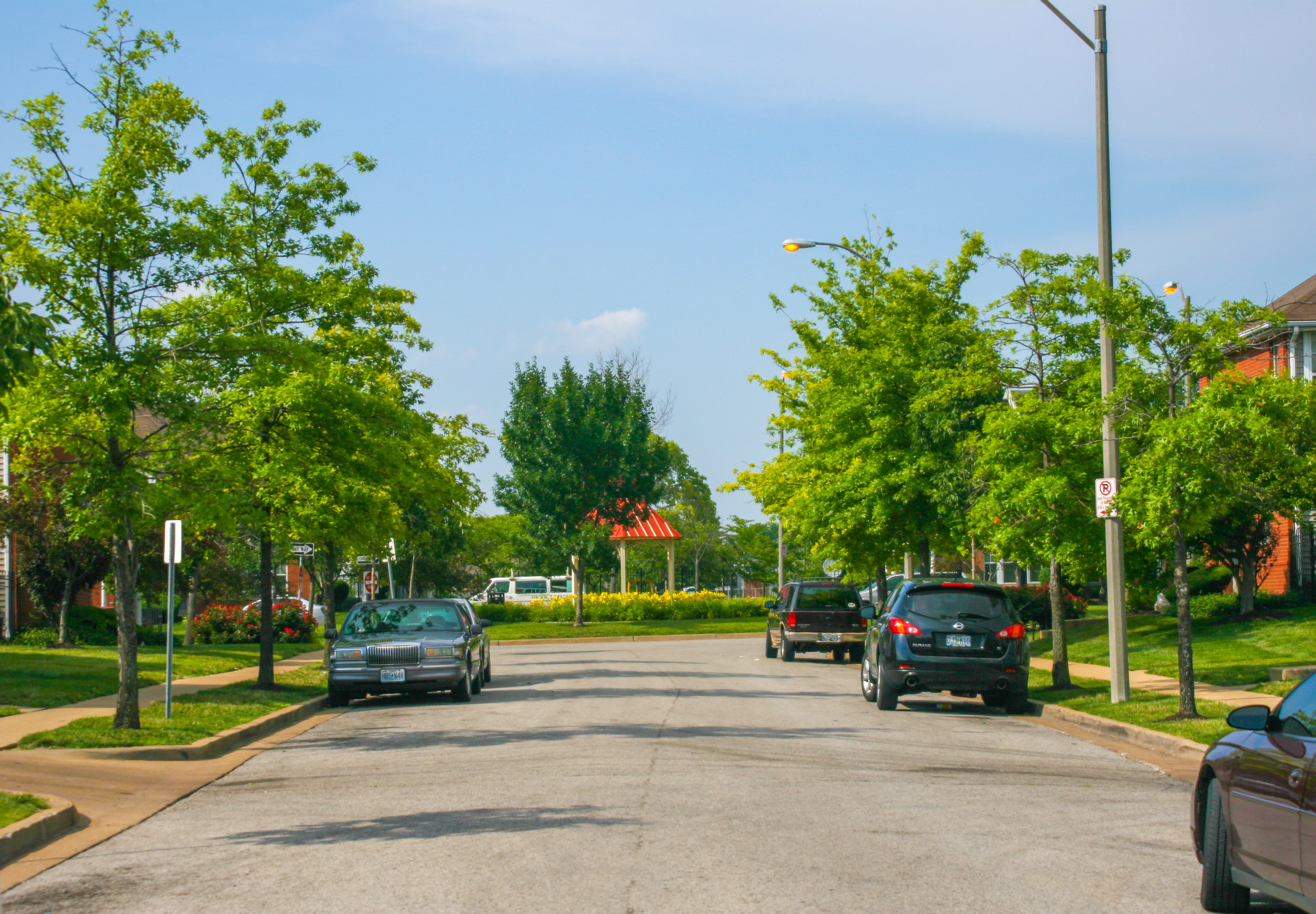
- Carr Square residential area, July 2013

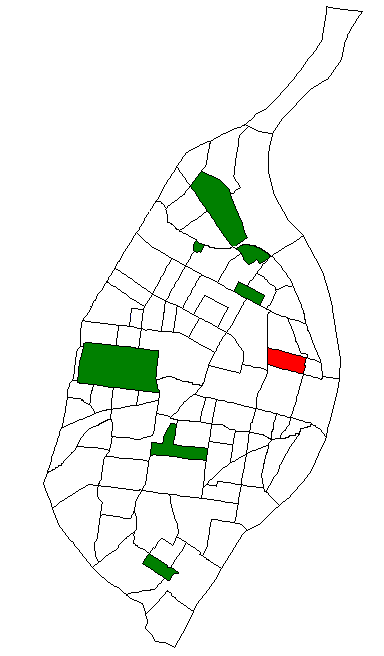
- Location (red) of Carr Square within St. Louis
- Country: United States
- State: Missouri
- City: St. Louis
- Ward: 14

Government
  - Alderperson: Rasheen Aldridge

Area
  - Total: 0.41 sq mi (1.1 km^{2})

Population (2020)
  - Total: 2,236
  - Density: 5,500/sq mi (2,100/km^{2})
- ZIP code(s): Part of 63106
- Area code(s): 314
- Website: stlouis-mo.gov

Carr Square is a neighborhood of St. Louis, Missouri, United States. The neighborhood is bounded by Cass Avenue on the north, Carr Street on the south, North Tucker Boulevard and North 13th Street on the east, and North Jefferson on the west.

== Demographics ==
In 2020 Carr Square's racial makeup was 94.9% Black, 2.1% White, 2.0% Two or More Races, and 0.7% Some Other Race. 0.9% of the population was of Hispanic or Latino origin.

Historical population
Census	Pop.	Note	%±
1990	3,070		—
2000	2,339		−23.8%
2010	2,774		18.6%
2020	2,236		−19.4%
