= Hyde Park, St. Louis =

Neighborhood of St. Louis in Missouri, US

Coordinates: 38.6623°N 90.2039°W

Hyde Park
- Neighborhood of St. Louis
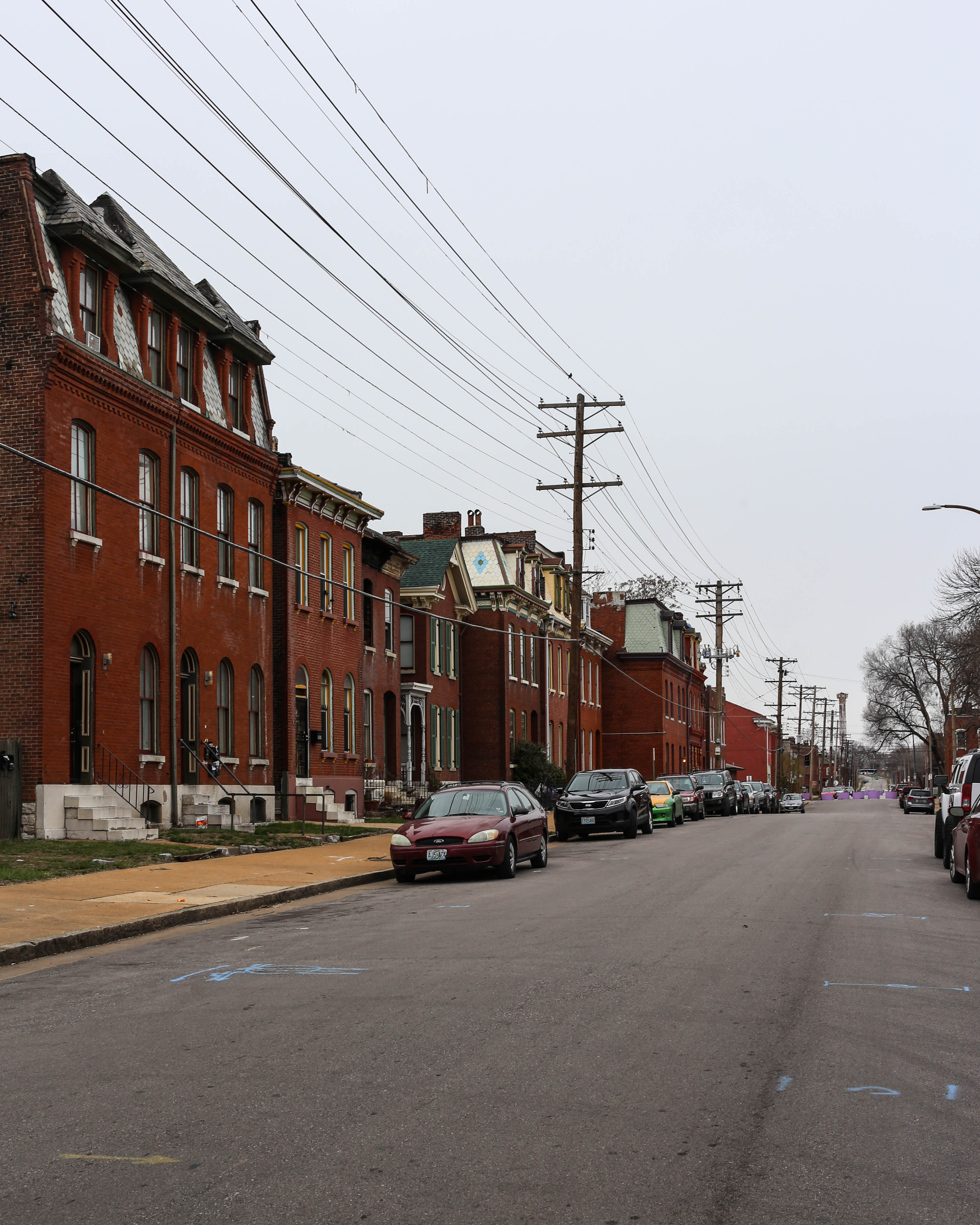
- Houses in Hyde Park, April 2018

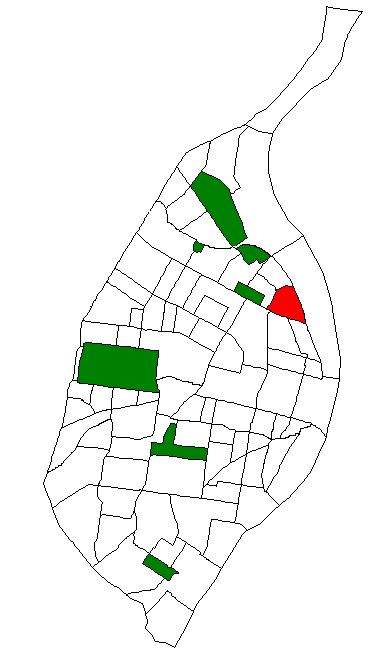
- Location (red) of Hyde Park within St. Louis
- Country: United States
- State: Missouri
- City: St. Louis
- Wards: 14

Government
  - Aldermen: Rasheen Aldridge

Area
  - Total: 0.57 sq mi (1.5 km^{2})

Population (2020)
  - Total: 2,271
  - Density: 4,000/sq mi (1,500/km^{2})
- ZIP code(s): Part of 63107
- Area code(s): 314
- Website: stlouis-mo.gov

Hyde Park is a neighborhood of St. Louis, Missouri. A historic North St. Louis neighborhood, Hyde Park is bound by Ferry to the North, I-70 to the East, Palm Street and Natural Bridge Avenue to the South, and Glasgow to the West.

The community is named after William Hyde.

The neighborhood lost its prosperity to industrial disinvestment following World War II. Harland Bartholomew included Hyde Park among the neighborhoods destined for slum clearance, and with the departure of General Motors, the North Side fell on its way to becoming a "ghost town." Racial conflicts were apparent. The mostly Caucasian leadership referred to the plans for Hyde Park and other neighborhoods in the urban core as "urban renewal," while the African-American leaders within the community referred to it as "Negro removal."

Located near the center of the neighborhood is the eponymous urban park, comprising an area of just less than 12 acres. The park is bounded by Bremen Avenue to the north, Blair Avenue to the east, Salisbury Street along the south edge, and North 20th Street to the west.

== Demographics ==
Historical population
| Census | Pop. | Note | %± |
|---|---|---|---|
| 1990 | 4,917 | | — |
| 2000 | 3,741 | | −23.9% |
| 2010 | 2,668 | | −28.7% |
| 2020 | 2,271 | | −14.9% |

In 2020 Hyde Park's population was 84.6% Black, 9.7% White, 0.3% Asian, 0.4% American Indian, 3.8% Two or More Races, and 1.2% Some Other Race. 1.6% of the population was of Hispanic or Latino origin.
