= Near North Riverfront, St. Louis =

Neighborhood of St. Louis in Missouri, US

Coordinates: 38.6595°N 90.1902°W

Near North Riverfront
- Neighborhood of St. Louis
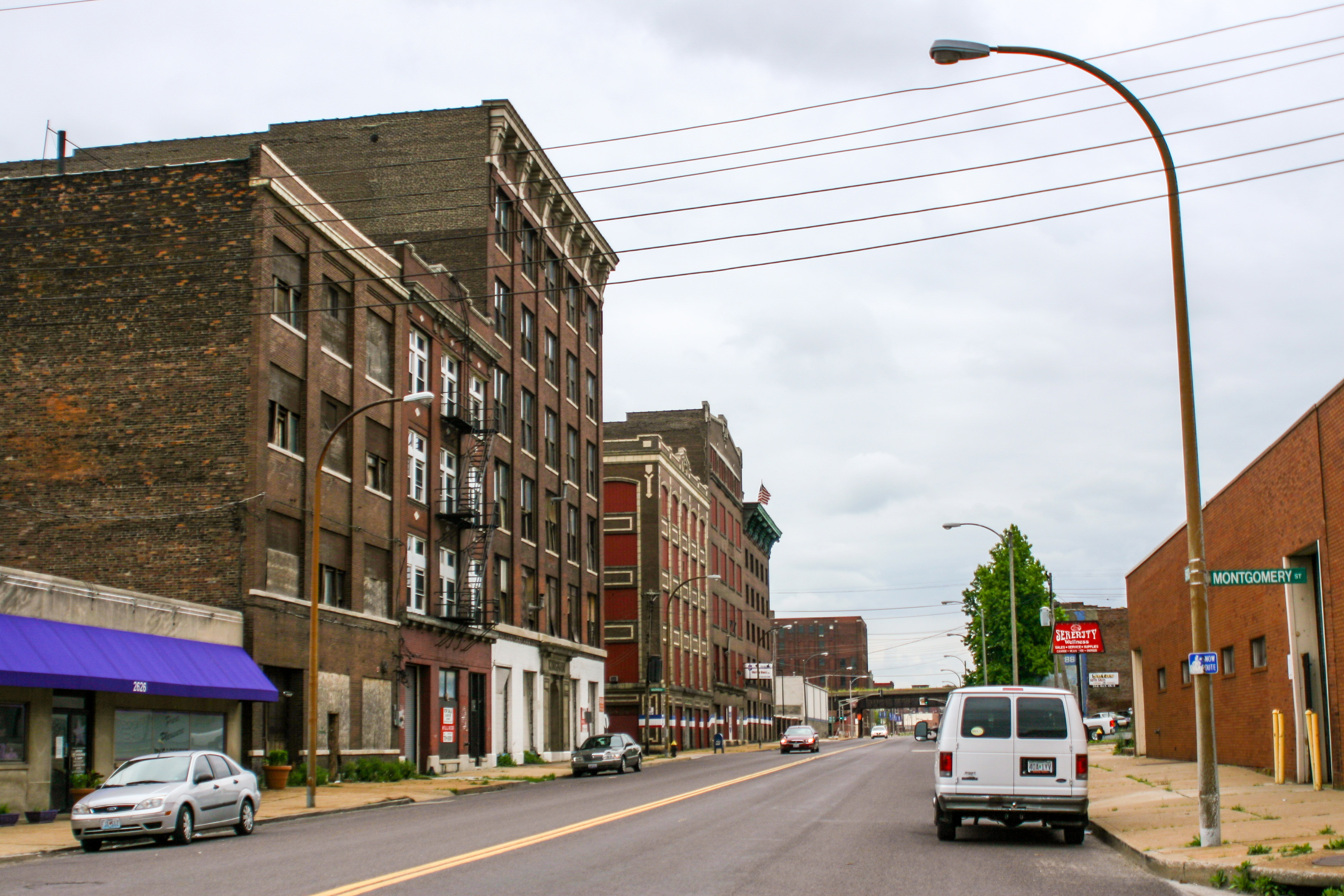
- Montgomery and Broadway, Near North Riverfront, June 2013

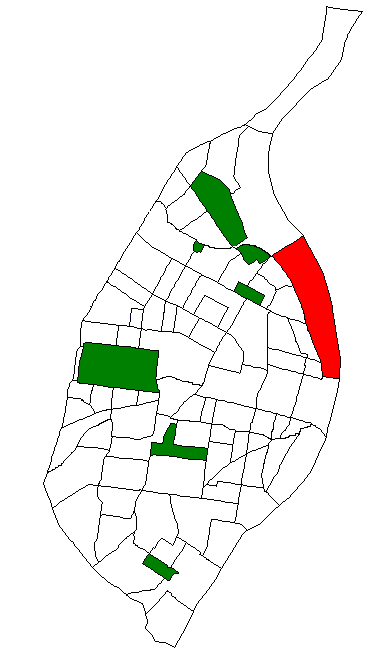
- Location (red) of the Near North Riverfront within St. Louis
- Country: United States
- State: Missouri
- City: St. Louis
- Wards: 8, 14

Government
  - Aldermen: Jami Cox Antwi, Rasheen Aldridge

Area
  - Total: 2.17 sq mi (5.6 km^{2})

Population (2020)
  - Total: 395
  - Density: 182/sq mi (70.3/km^{2})
- ZIP code(s): Parts of 63102, 63147
- Area code(s): 314
- Website: stlouis-mo.gov

Near North Riverfront is a neighborhood of St. Louis, Missouri. Between 1990 and 2000 Near North Riverfront led the city in percentage population growth, growing 89% over the decade. Despite this large percentage growth, Near North Riverfront is largely non-residential and so the 89% percent gain represented a numerical gain of only 306 persons. The neighborhood is served by major city streets such as Tucker Boulevard, West Florissant Avenue, and Broadway Boulevard.

== Demographics ==
In 2020 Near North Riverfront's racial makeup was 50.6% Black, 42.5% White, 0.3% Native American, 2.8% Asian, 2.1% Two or More Races, and 1.8% Some Other Race. 3.8% of the population was of Hispanic or Latino origin.

Historical population
Year	Pop.	±%
1990	342	—
2000	648	+89.5%
2010	553	−14.7%
2020	395	−28.6%
