= Aloe Plaza =

Public park in St. Louis, Missouri

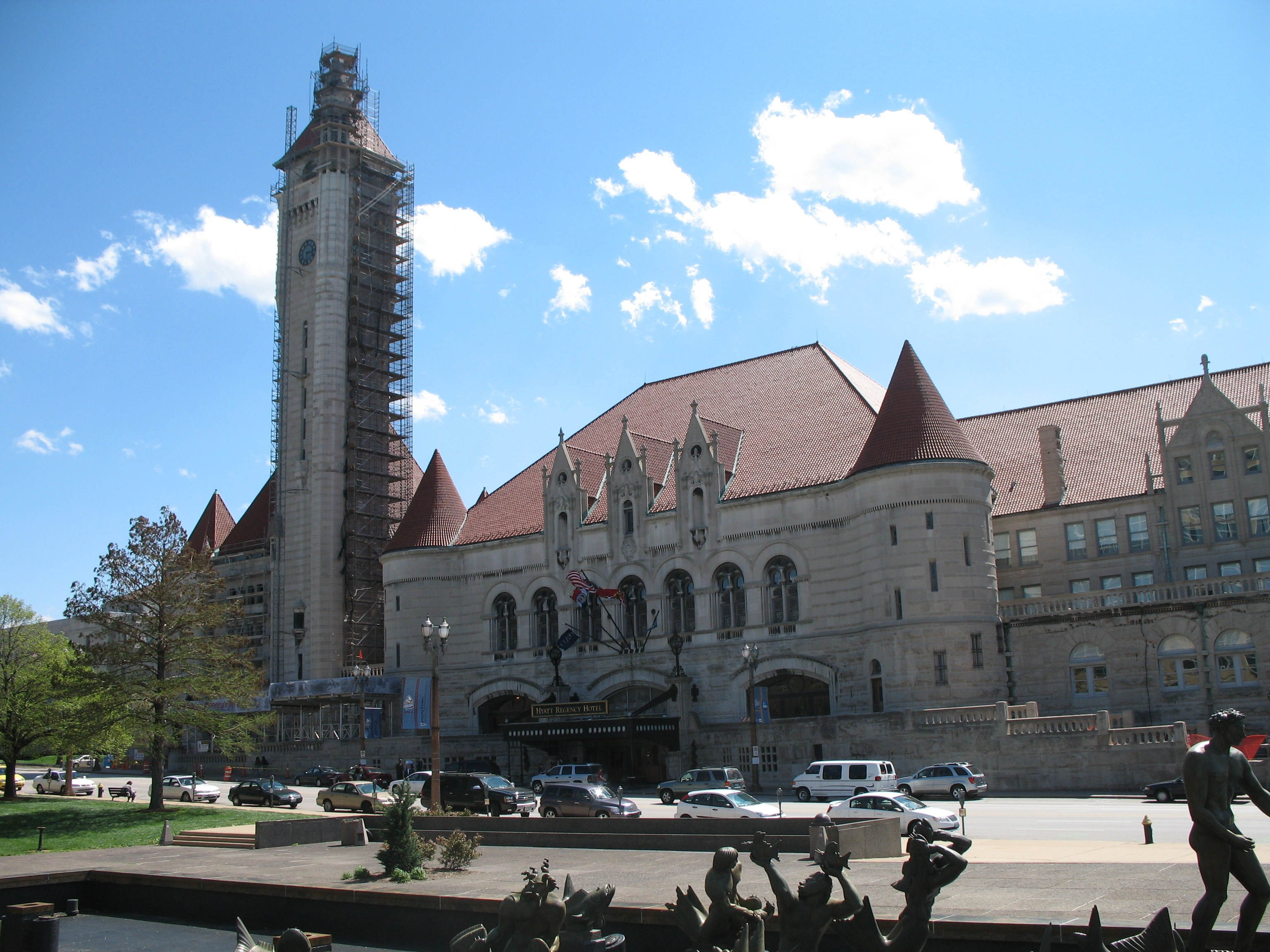
- Aloe Plaza and Meeting of the Waters with Union Station in the background
- Interactive map of Aloe Plaza
- Type: Urban park
- Location: St. Louis, Missouri
- Coordinates: 38°37′47.8″N 90°12′27.7″W
- Area: 3.35 acres (1.36 ha)
- Opened: 1932 (Aloe Plaza); 1969 (Aloe Plaza West)
- Operator: City of St. Louis
- Parking: Street parking
- Public transit: MetroBus; Red Blue; At Union Station
- Website: stlouis-mo.gov

Aloe Plaza is a public park in the Downtown West neighborhood of St. Louis, Missouri. The park is part of the Gateway Mall and is bounded by Chestnut and Market streets on the north and south and 18th and 20th streets on the east and west.

== History ==
In 1923 city voters passed an $87 million bond issue that would fund public improvements, including a civic center downtown. At the time city leaders felt the "slums" that fronted the city's large public buildings were a "depressing influence" on visitors to St. Louis. Using funds from the bond issue the city cleared the block in front of Union Station and opened Aloe Plaza in 1932. Originally the plaza was lightly landscaped with only trees around its perimeter and a circular garden in the center.

In 1940 the city added Carl Milles' fountain, Meeting of the Waters, to the center of the block. Symbolizing the confluence of the Mississippi and Missouri rivers, two large figures represent each river and seventeen mythical creatures representing smaller tributaries adorn the fountain.

In 1969, a small extension named Aloe Plaza West opened to the west of 20th Street. Initially the extension was underutilized green space near the ramps to a never built north-south distributor highway. After being awarded a Major League Soccer team in 2020, team owners elected to demolish the distributor ramps and incorporate Aloe Plaza West into the stadium site and the Brickline Greenway along Market Street.

Originally, the 2009 Gateway Mall Master Plan identified Aloe Plaza and Aloe Plaza West as the Mall's terminus. Aloe Plaza was recommended to get some basic landscaping improvements with some additional gardens. In 2020, the master plan was amended to include Energizer Park (and Aloe Plaza West) as the terminus. Before, the plan had proposed an observation earthwork mound for the west extension, similar to the ancient mounds at Cahokia.

== Meeting of the Waters ==
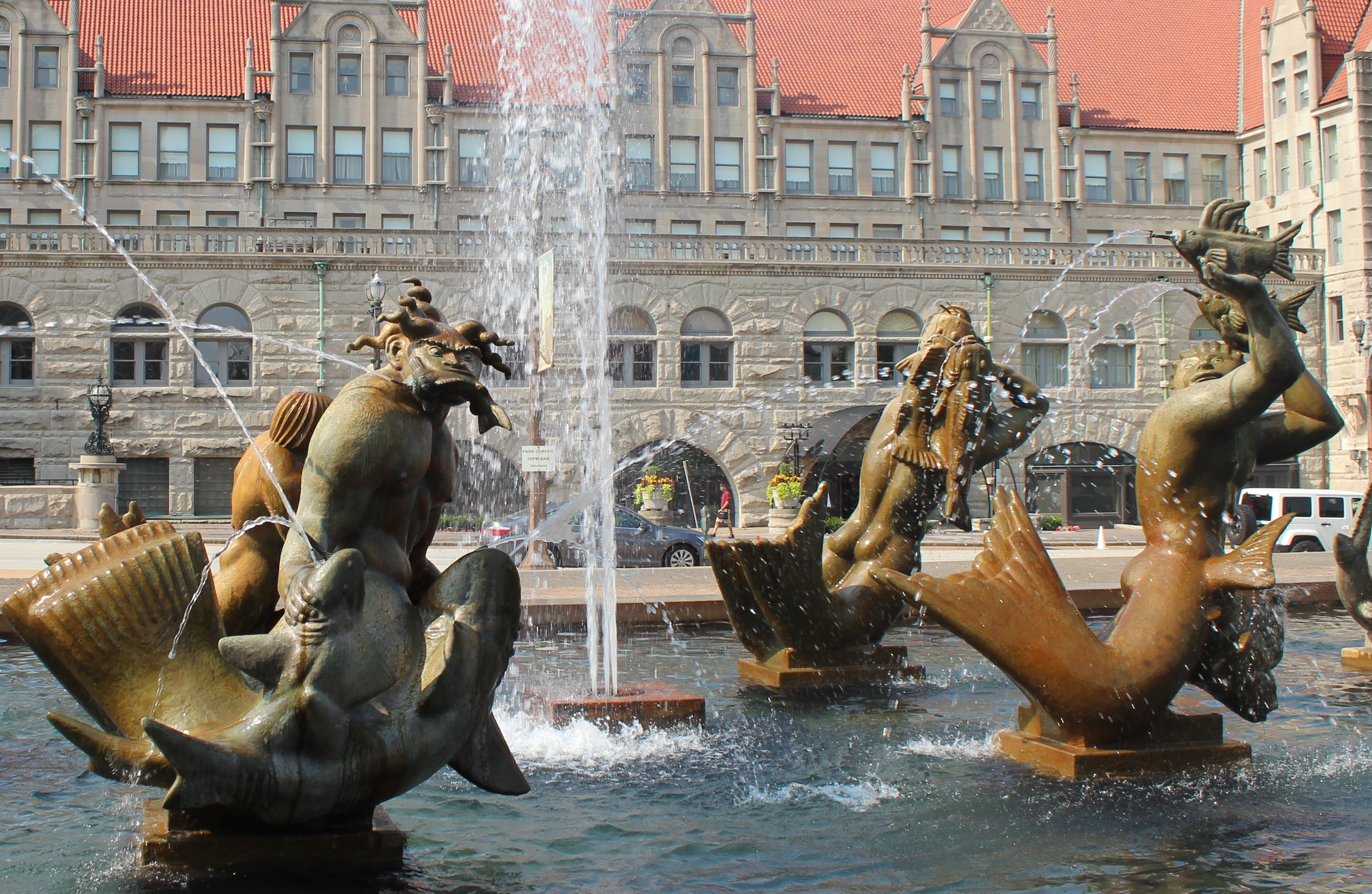
Some of figures from Meeting of the Waters seen from Aloe Plaza

Aloe Plaza is dominated by the large fountain Meeting of the Waters, a St. Louis landmark designed by Carl Milles, symbolizing the confluence of the Mississippi and Missouri Rivers. Two large figures represent the two rivers, and seventeen mythical creatures representing smaller tributaries adorn the fountain.

Meeting of the Waters is Milles' best known American work. Edith Aloe, Louis P. Aloe’s widow, was instrumental in Meeting of the Waters being funded and commissioned.The statue was commissioned in 1936, completed in 1939, and unveiled on May 11, 1940.

Initially, the fountain met some criticism for its irreverent features, particularly for the nudity of the main figures (male and female figures representing the Mississippi and Missouri rivers, respectively). Milles had named the fountain Wedding of the Waters and conceived the seventeen smaller naked figures as a wedding party. Officials felt that a nude wedding ceremony was offensive, and insisted that the name be changed to Meeting of the Waters.
