= Downtown West, St. Louis =

Neighborhood of St. Louis, Missouri, US

Coordinates: 38.6295°N 90.2078°W

Downtown West
- Neighborhood of St. Louis
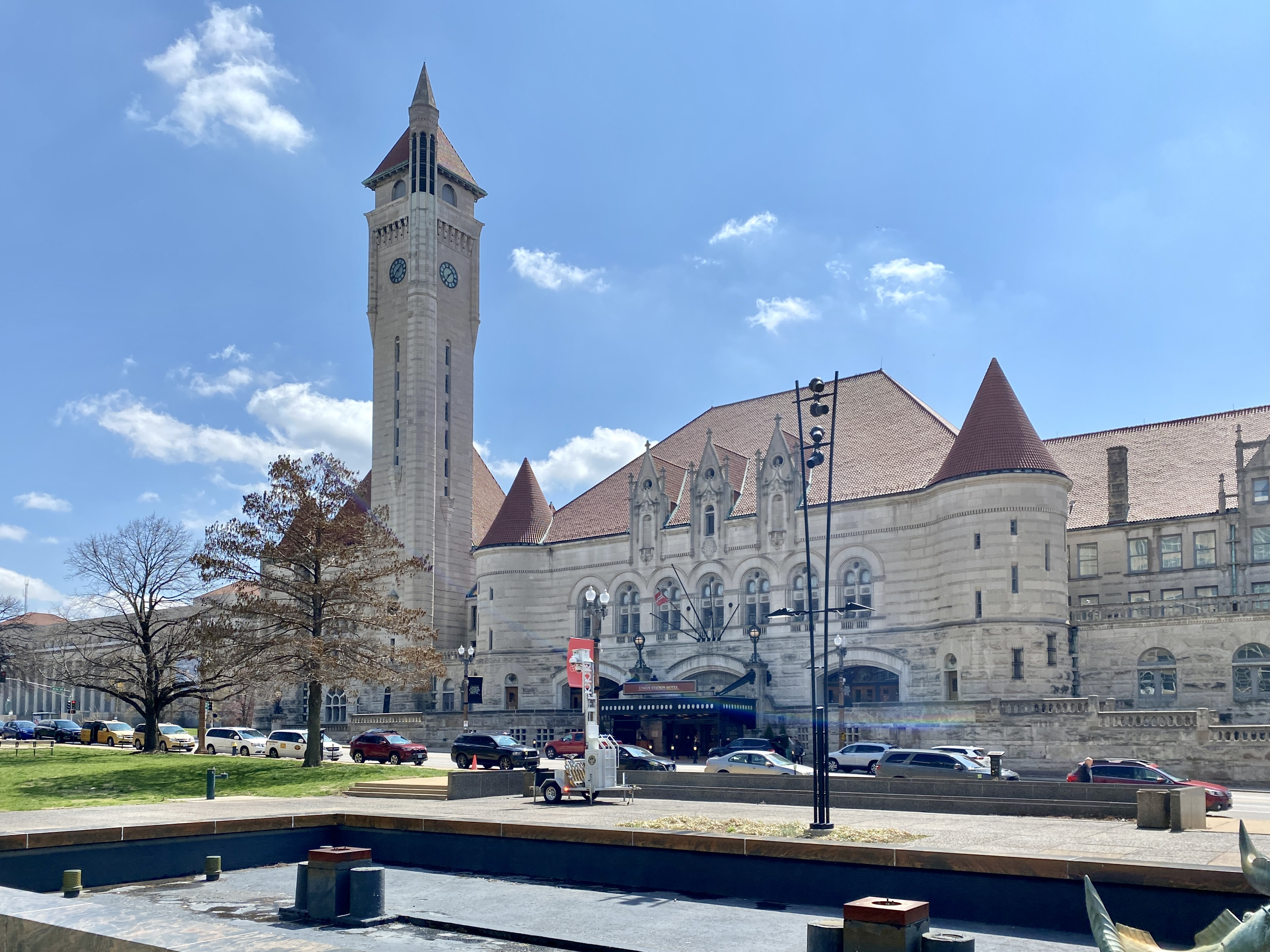
- St. Louis Union Station in Downtown West.

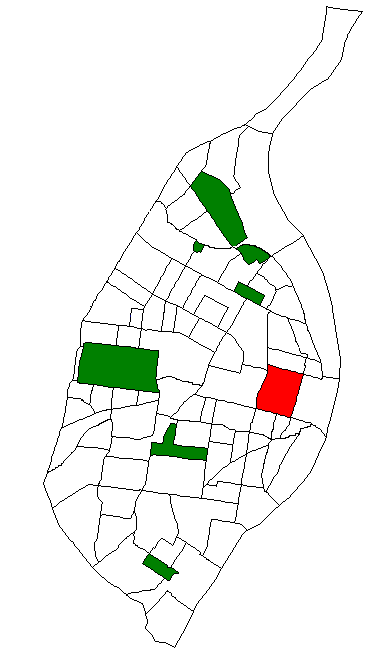
- Location (red) of Downtown West within St. Louis
- Country: United States
- State: Missouri
- City: St. Louis
- Wards: 8, 14

Government
  - Alderpersons: Jami Cox Antwi, Rasheen Aldridge

Area
  - Total: 1.15 sq mi (3.0 km^{2})

Population (2020)
  - Total: 5,115
  - Density: 4,450/sq mi (1,720/km^{2})
- ZIP code(s): Parts of 63103, 63106
- Area code(s): 314
- Website: stlouis-mo.gov

Downtown West is a neighborhood in St. Louis, Missouri. It is, as the name suggests, a section of downtown that is further inland, west from the banks of the Mississippi River. St. Louis City Hall, the Metropolitan Police Headquarters, St. Louis Union Station, Stifel Theatre, Enterprise Center, the City Museum and Energizer Park are all located in Downtown West. The Washington Avenue Historic District is a former garment district consisting of turn of the previous century high rise warehouses converted into residential lofts, restaurants, taverns, and coffee shops. It is bounded by Jefferson Avenue on the west, Tucker Boulevard on the east, Cole Street on the north, and Chouteau Avenue on the south.

== Demographics ==
In 2020 Downtown West's racial makeup was 46.2% White, 41.0% Black, 0.4% Native American, 4.0% Asian, 6.0% Two or More Races, and 2.3% Some Other Race. 4.8% of the population was of Hispanic or Latino origin.

Racial composition	1990	2000	2010	2020
White	58.7%	44.4%	56.3%	46.2%
Black or African American	39.3%	49.5%	36.9%	41.0%
Hispanic or Latino (of any race)		2.5%	2.6%	4.8%
Asian		2.0%	3.7%	4.0%

Historical population
Year	Pop.	±%
1990	2,535	—
2000	2,204	−13.1%
2010	3,940	+78.8%
2020	5,115	+29.8%

== See also ==
- Downtown St. Louis
- Gateway Multimodal Transportation Center
