= Laclede's Landing, St. Louis =

Neighborhood of St. Louis, Missouri, US

Coordinates: 38.63030°N 90.18331°W

- Laclede's Landing
- U.S. National Register of Historic Places
- U.S. Historic district
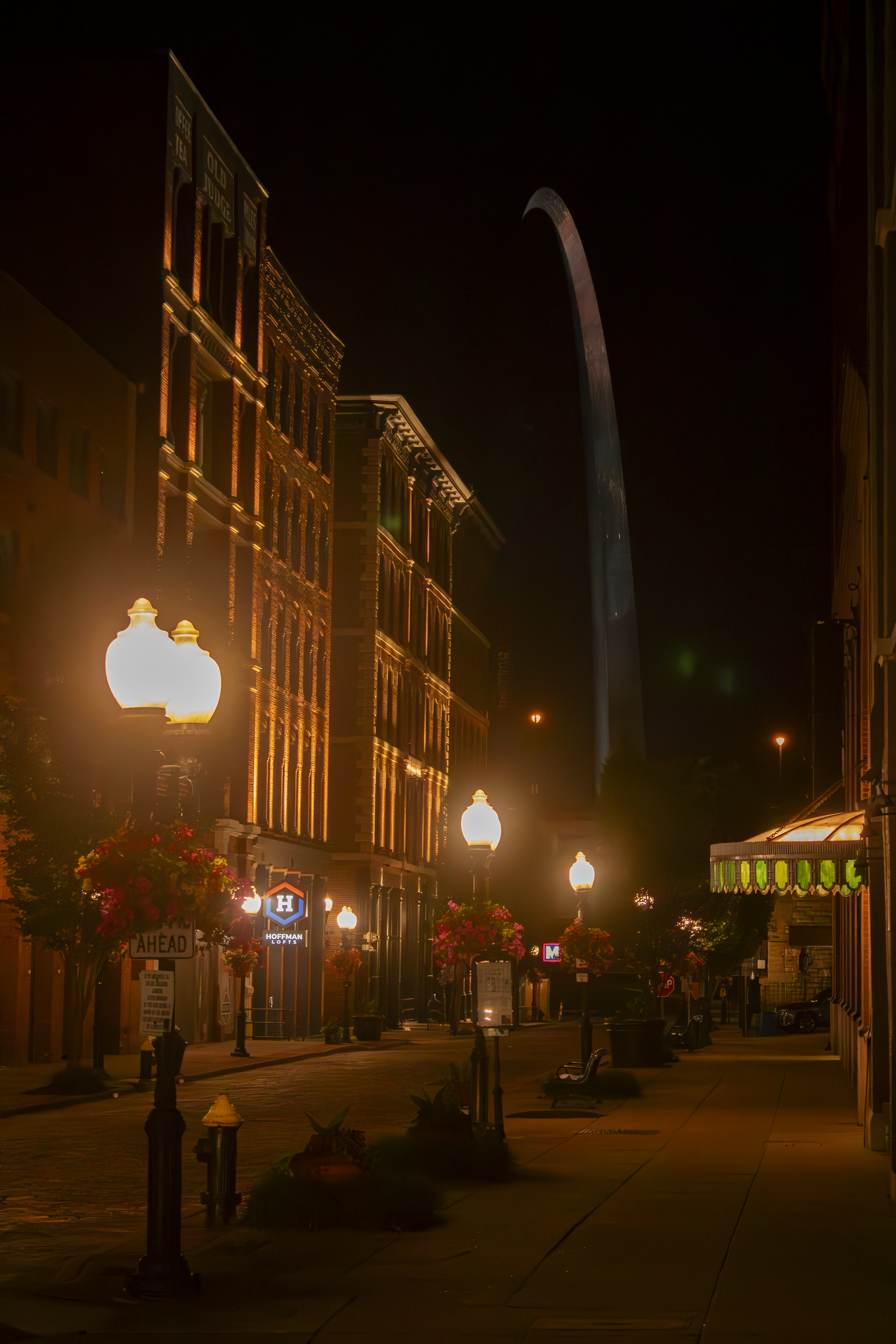
- A street view of historic Laclede's Landing, with the Gateway Arch illuminated from the inside

- Location within St. Louis Location within Missouri Location within the United States
- Location: Roughly bounded by Washington, N. 3rd, Dr. Martin Luther King Dr., and the Mississippi River, St. Louis, Missouri
- Area: 22 acres (8.9 ha)
- Built: 1780
- Architectural style: Late Victorian, Federal
- NRHP reference No.: 76002262
- Added to NRHP: August 25, 1976

Laclede's Landing (/ləˌkliːdz-/), colloquially "the Landing", is a small urban historic district in St. Louis, Missouri. It marks the northern part of the original settlement founded by the Frenchman Pierre Laclède, whose landing on the riverside the placename commemorates. Originally he tasked his 14-year-old stepson, Auguste Chouteau, with the task of preparing the land that sat 10 miles south of the Mississippi-Missouri area. A stone house was erected and named Laclede's home in the village he named "St. Louis" as a homage to King Louis IX of France. Initially, fur trade and trapping was the economic interest that would spark Pierre's interest in using the landing and making his stepson the richest citizen. The area is now decorated with 19th century warehouses and other period buildings.

Located just north of Gateway Arch National Park (separated by the overland spans of the Eads Bridge) on the Mississippi River front, the Landing is a collection of cobblestone streets and vintage brick-and-cast-iron warehouses dating from 1850 through 1900, now converted into shops, restaurants, and bars. The district is the only remaining section of St. Louis' 19th-century commercial riverfront.

== Transportation ==
Laclede's Landing has many cobblestone streets. It is adjacent to the Eads Bridge, and Interstate 44 (I-44 does not run over the Eads Bridge). On the Eads Bridge, there is the Laclede's Landing MetroLink Stop. Laclede's Landing once housed Metro's (the local transit agency) headquarters.

== In popular culture ==
Alternative rock band Wilco mentions the Landing in "Heavy Metal Drummer", a song on the 2002 album, Yankee Hotel Foxtrot. Although now based in Chicago, Wilco was initially based in St. Louis and cut their teeth in rock clubs in and around the Landing. Frontman Jeff Tweedy grew up in nearby Belleville, Illinois.
