= Rasheen Aldridge Jr. =

American politician (born 1994)

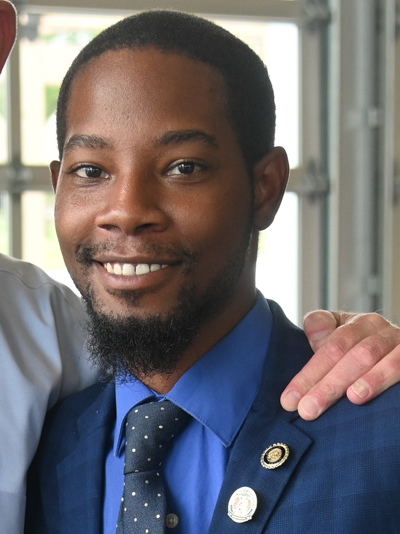

Member of the St. Louis Board of Alderpersons from the 14th ward
- Incumbent
- Assumed office April 18, 2023

Member of the Missouri House of Representatives from the 78th district
- In office 2019–2023
- Preceded by: Bruce Franks Jr.
- Succeeded by: Marty Joe Murray

Personal details
- Born: March 15, 1994 (age 32) St. Louis, Missouri, U.S.
- Party: Democratic
- Occupation: Community organizer, activist
- Website: www.rasheenaldridge.com/issues

Rasheen Aldridge Jr. (born 1994) is an American politician, currently serving in the St. Louis Board of Alderpersons in the 14th ward. He previously served in the Missouri House of Representatives from the 78th district of St. Louis, Missouri.

== Early life ==
Aldridge was born in St. Louis, Missouri to a single mother. He attended Parkway West high school and then enrolled in the St. Louis Community College.

== Activism ==
In 2014, he was recognized by the Youth Council for Positive Development with the ‘2013 Jamala Rogers Young Visionary Award" that supports "young adults who have made efforts to promote social justice, equality, diversity and human rights." In 2015, he was invited to speak at the World Bank's three-day conference on "Fragility, Conflict and Violence."

Aldridge serves as director of the organization "Young Activists United St. Louis" and sits as student co-chair on the non-profit organisation "Missouri Jobs with Justice". He was appointed on the Ferguson Commission, created by the State of Missouri following the shooting of Michael Brown in August 2014 in Ferguson, Missouri and the subsequent civil unrest, whose mandate was to submit policy recommendations in various areas of social life, such as citizen-law enforcement interaction and relations; racial and ethnic relations; municipal government organization and the municipal court system; and disparities in areas including education, economic opportunity, housing, transportation, health care, child care, business ownership, and family and community stability.

Aldridge also leads the workers' movement "Show Me 15", a reference to the demand for a federally mandated $15 minimum wage.

== Politics ==
On May 16, 2019, Bruce Franks Jr. announced that, for reasons of mental illness, he would resign as the 78th District's State Representative. Aldridge was tapped to replace him. In the November 5, 2019, special election, Aldridge won the seat. He is serving in the Committee for Appropriations, and in its sub-committees on Public Safety and on Children & Families.

On January 30, 2020, he introduced, along with co-sponsors Bob Burns and Chris Carter, of Districts 93 and 76 respectively, House Bill 2352 that would designate April as "Limb-Loss Awareness Month" in Missouri.

=== 2020 St. Louis protest ===
On June 28, 2020, Black Lives Matter protesters entered Portland and Westmoreland Places, a private gated community, to protest at the residence of St. Louis Mayor Lyda Krewson, and demand her resignation, on the grounds that she had publicly read names and addresses of those who had submitted letters calling to defund the St. Louis Metropolitan Police Department. As protesters marched toward the mayor's home, the couple of Mark and Patricia McCloskey stood outside their home holding firearms, whereby verbal altercations followed between the couple and marchers.

State Representative Aldridge helped lead the protest through the private community, and, following the McCloskey incident, stated that "no threats were ever made" by the protesters. When asked about the group marching on private property, Aldridge responded, "Just like in many disobedient protests, even in the '60s, you break laws, make people feel uncomfortable [but] we're not doing anything where we're hurting anyone or putting anyone in danger."

== Personal life ==
Aldridge was born with one leg shorter than the other and uses a full prosthetic right-leg. Aldridge is openly gay.

== Electoral history ==
2019 Missouri's 78th House District special election
Party	Candidate	Votes	%
General election
Democratic	Rasheen Aldridge Jr.	909	99.3
Write-in		6	0.7

2020 Missouri's 78th House District election
Primary election
Party	Candidate	Votes	%
Democratic	Rasheen Aldridge Jr.	5,578	100.0
General election
Democratic	Rasheen Aldridge Jr.	11,148	85.5
Republican	Timothy Gartin	1,890	14.5

Missouri House of Representatives Election, November 8, 2022, District 78
Party	Candidate	Votes	%	±%
Democratic	Rasheen Aldridge Jr.	6,869	100.00%	0.00
