= Carl Madsen =

Carl Madsen may refer to:

- Carl Madsen (trade unionist), Danish trade unionist and politician
- Carl Madsen (American football), American football official
- Karl Madsen (Carl Johan Wilhelm Madsen), Danish painter and art historian
- Carl Viggo Madsen, Danish poet and writer
