= General Stewart =

General Stewart may refer to:

== United Kingdom ==
- Alexander Stewart (British Army officer) (c. 1739–1794), British Army major general
- Alexander Stewart, Earl of Mar (c. 1375–1435), Scottish general
- Andrew Stewart (British Army officer), (born 1952), British Army major general
- Sir Donald Stewart, 1st Baronet (1824–1900), British Indian Army general
- Herbert Stewart (1843–1885), British Army major general
- Ian MacAlister Stewart (1895–1987), British Army brigadier general
- James Stewart (British Army general) (c. 1699–1768), Scots Guards lieutenant general
- William Stewart (British Army officer, born 1774) (1774–1827), British Army lieutenant general

== United States ==
- Alexander P. Stewart (1821–1908), Confederate States Army lieutenant general
- David F. Stewart (fl. 1990s–2020s), U.S. Army brigadier general
- James T. Stewart (1921–1990), U.S. Air Force lieutenant general
- James Stewart (1908–1997), American actor who was also a U.S. Air Force major general
- Joseph D. Stewart (1942–2019), U.S. Marine Corps major general
- Merch Bradt Stewart (1875–1934), U.S. Army temporary brigadier general
- Phillip A. Stewart (fl. 1990s–2020s), U.S. Air Force major general
- Robert L. Stewart (born 1942), U.S. Army brigadier general
- Walter Stewart (general) (1756–1796), Continental Army brevet brigadier general and militia major general

== Others ==
- Bernard Stewart, 4th Lord of Aubigny (c. 1452–1508), French Army lieutenant general
- James Stewart (Australian Army officer) (1884–1947), Australian Army brigadier general
- John Smith Stewart (1878–1970), Canadian Army brigadier general
- John Stewart, Earl of Buchan (c. 1381–1424), Scottish nobleman allied with France in the Hundred Years War
- Keith Lindsay Stewart (1896–1972), New Zealand major general
- Robert Stewart, 4th Lord of Aubigny (c. 1470–1544), French soldier who ultimately served as Marshal of France
- Vincent Stewart (born 1958), New Zealand lieutenant general
- William Stewart, 2nd Viscount Mountjoy (1675–1728), Master-General of the Ordnance of Ireland

== See also ==
- Arthur Stewart-Cox (1925–2003), British Army major general
- John Stewart-Murray, 8th Duke of Atholl (1871–1942), British Army brigadier general
- General Steuart (disambiguation)
- General Stuart (disambiguation)
- Attorney General Stewart (disambiguation)
