= St. Louis Public Schools =

School district in Missouri, U.S.

Saint Louis Public School District
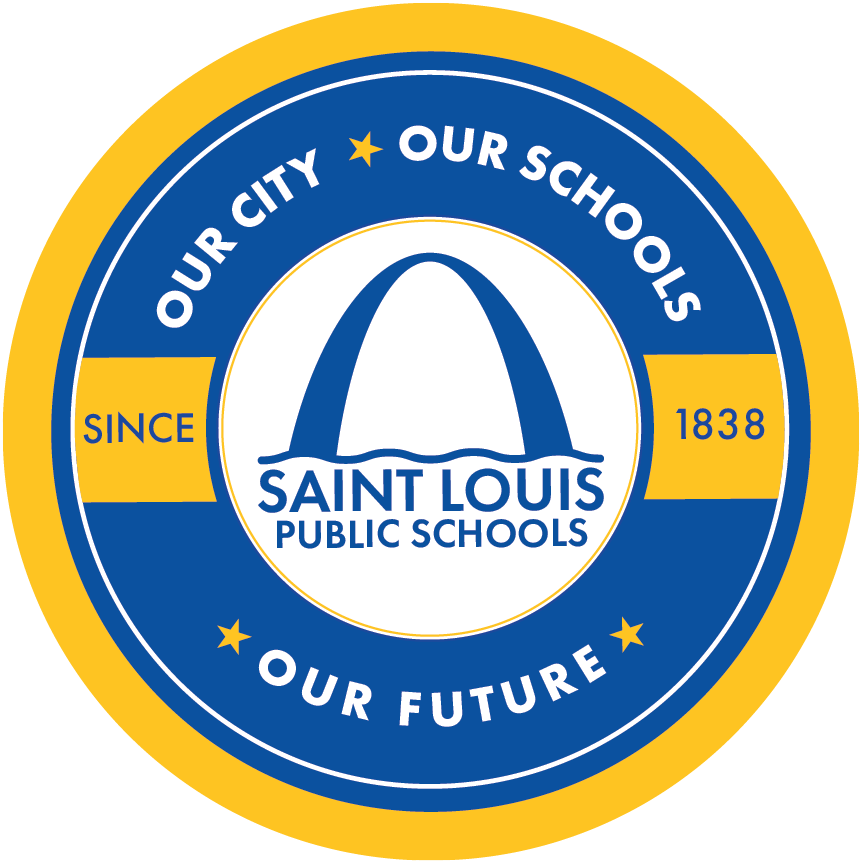

Location
- 801 N 11th Street St. Louis, Missouri, 63101 Missouri

District information
- Type: Public
- Motto: Our City. Our Schools. Our Future.
- Grades: Pre K-12
- Established: April 5, 1838; 188 years ago
- Superintendent: Dr. Myra Berry
- Schools: 60
- Budget: $384,594,337.85 (2020-2021)

Students and staff
- Students: 20,000 (2022-2023)
- Teachers: 1,625
- Staff: 1,937
- Athletic conference: Missouri State High School Activities Association

Other information
- Website: www.slps.org

Saint Louis Public School District (SLPS) is the school district that operates public schools in the City of St. Louis, Missouri (but not St. Louis County, which is an entity independent of the city).

== History ==
=== Beginnings ===
The act of the United States Congress that created the Missouri Territory in June 1812 also required that all land in the territory not belonging to private individuals or to the government for military purposes was reserved for schools. In January 1817, the legislature of the Missouri Territory voted to create a board of trustees to manage all land and property designated to be used for schools in St. Louis. The board also was given the power to employ teachers and create regulations for the schools. The first chairman of the board was William Clark, and its first meeting was held in April 1817. In his role as chairman, Clark repeatedly wrote to President James Monroe requesting that Monroe identify land used for military purposes so that other land could be used for schools. After several exchanges between local military leaders, Clark, and President Monroe, in 1817 the federal government relinquished its claim to all land except for a small part, and further relinquished that area in 1824. Starting in 1817, the board of trustees began leasing its lands to provide income for future schools.

In 1833, the Missouri General Assembly established a second governing body for St. Louis schools, which first met on April 18 of that year. This body, known as the Board of Education, continued to lease vacant land to provide income, although some of this money was mismanaged due to inaccurate boundary lines. In December 1833, the Board began to loan out money on interest, but up to that point, no money had been appropriated for the purposes of an actual school. For the next four years, the board continued to loan money and study school plans, but took no action to build a school. In 1836, the people of St. Louis voted to sell the city's common land and to appropriate 10 percent of the proceeds from the sale toward the establishment of a public school district. From this sale about $15,000 was provided to the board.

=== First schools ===
Enrollment (1848–1970)
Year	Total enrollment
1848	900
1851	2,100
1858	5,814
1859	6,253
1860	7,040
1861	8,098
1862	8,654
1863	5,272
1864	7,714
1865	13,926
1867	15,291
1868	20,594
1871	31,087
1874	34,273
1879	55,122
1899	78,648
1906	92,030
1919	105,795
1921	108,226
1960	108,770
1970	111,233

In July 1837, the board agreed to build two school buildings, known as the North School and the South School, respectively located at the northeast corner of Broadway and Martin Luther King Boulevard (then Cherry Street) and at the southwest corner of 4th and Spruce streets. In December, the board met to purchase supplies and to interview potential teachers, and by March 1838, they had selected two candidates, David Armstrong and Miss M.H. Salisbury. The South School, later named Laclede Primary School, opened on April 1, 1838, with Edward Leavy and Sarah Hardy as co-principals. A third school, later named Benton School, opened in January 1842 at the northwest corner of 6th and Locust. The North School, for which the board initially could not find a teacher, was abandoned and sold shortly after construction of Benton School due to the encroachment of a nearby market.

With the growth of the city, the school building campaign continued at a rapid pace. Between 1840 and 1860, more than twenty new schools were built by the board, while several others occupied rented space. Among these new schools was the first high school in St. Louis, which opened inside Benton School in February 1853. Approximately 70 students enrolled in the school, and its first principal was Jeremiah D. Low. Courses offered included higher arithmetic, grammar and composition, basic and advanced algebra, geometry, trigonometry, surveying, navigation, and the Latin and German languages. The high school proved very popular among all social classes, and it encouraged attendance at lower-level schools. After two years of construction, the first high school building, known as Central High School, opened on Olive Street in July 1855.

In 1848 William Greenleaf Eliot, the Unitarian clergyman in Saint Louis, was elected chair of the school board. He had a passion for creating schools. He and his congregants worked on a campaign to fund the expanding district. Only weeks after the St. Louis Fire of 1849, St. Louis voters approved a 1/10 percent property tax to support the district, and three years later, the Missouri General Assembly passed a school tax, which set aside 25 percent of state funds for education and provided schools with money depending on their enrollment. During the 1850s, it became a St. Louis school tradition for students at each school to "go a Maying", which was to take an excursion into the countryside. These early field trips were more for recreation than for learning, but school administrators regarded them as healthy trips.

School closed six weeks early in 1861 due to a lack of operating funds and the outbreak of the Civil War. After the Civil War, in 1866, the district opened three schools for African American students.

The St. Louis Public Schools also opened the first public high school for black students west of the Mississippi, Sumner High School, in 1875.

St. Louis Public Schools opened the first public kindergarten in North America in 1873 under the direction of William Torrey Harris, then Superintendent of Schools, and Susan Blow, who had studied the methods of Friedrich Fröbel, the founder of the kindergarten system.

By the end of the 19th century, the district had 95 schools and employed more than 1,600 teachers.

=== 1900s to 1930s ===
By the 20th century, the population in St. Louis was 575,238. Public school enrollment was 62,797, employing 1,665 teachers in ninety schools.

Another St. Louis first was the Educational Museum, which featured articles purchased from the 1904 World's Fair Palace of Education. The museum opened in 1905, and in 1943 it evolved into the first audiovisual department in the United States.

The public schools continued to grow with the city, opening special open air schools for children at risk for tuberculosis, schools for deaf children and those needing individualized instruction, as well as children with orthopedic disabilities.

The first vocational school had opened in 1868, with two more opening in the 1920s.

In late 1918, the schools were closed for 45 days due to the worldwide flu epidemic, and in the spring of 1919 school days were lengthened in an attempt to recover lost time.

During the Great Depression, special programs such as free milk and lunches, and sewing classes were established to help families and conserve resources; teacher salaries were reduced, construction was postponed, and class sizes were increased.

Students aided the war effort during both World War I and World War II by knitting scarves and socks for soldiers, raising poultry, cultivating victory gardens, collecting scrap metal, and buying war stamps.

=== 1950s to present ===
By the 1950s a number of new schools were built to ease overcrowding, and in the 1960s, more attention was given to meeting the challenges of urban schools, including racial equality, poverty, overcrowded classrooms, and deteriorating school buildings. The 1956 film A City Decides looked at efforts to desegregate schools in St. Louis, and was nominated for an Academy Award for Best Documentary Short. St. Louis Public Schools attained its peak enrollment of 115,543 students in 1967. The district enrolled 108,770 students in 1960 and 111,233 students in 1970.

Since then, efforts have focused on programs such as magnet schools and the Voluntary Interdistrict Transfer Program which were initiated to provide students with the opportunity to attend racially mixed schools. Metro High School was created as a magnet school for racial integration in the 1970s. Metro High School is ranked as the 220th best public high school in the United States by U.S. News & World Report.

In 2007 the state of Missouri took control of St. Louis Public Schools and stripped them of accreditation. This decision was made due to the poor standardized test scores, graduation rates, leadership, and mismanagement of money. In 2006 SLPS was $25 million in debt and had a graduation rate of approximately 55 percent. Almost 19 percent of students were dropping out and over half of students were scoring below grade level on standardized tests. As a result, the state appointed a board to run the district for 6 years. Over the next decade the district worked to increase test scores, graduation rates and attendance. As a result, St. Louis Public Schools regained accreditation in January 2017. The district had a 72 percent graduation rate, over $19 million surplus, and continually improving test scores.

In April 2025, St. Louis Public Schools president Antionette "Toni" Cousins lost re-election to the St. Louis School Board.

== Demographics ==
In the 2009–2010 school year, the district had an enrollment of approximately 25,000 students and 2,200 teachers, for a student-teacher ratio of 11.4.

In the 2013–2014 school year, the district increased its enrollment to approximately 25,200. Over 88% of students qualify for free or reduced price lunches. Since 2006, more than 80 percent of the student population has been Black, with 82% in 2013–2014. Concurrent with a decline in the population of the city of St. Louis, the district has seen declining enrollment; since 2006 the district student population has decreased by more than 10,000 students.

Enrollment
Year	Total enrollment	Black (%)	White (%)	Hispanic (%)	Asian (%)	Indian (%)	Free or reduced lunch (%)
2001	36,939	—	—	—	—	—	—
2002	37,138	—	—	—	—	—	—
2003	36,084	—	—	—	—	—	—
2004	34,445	—	—	—	—	—	—
2005	32,947	—	—	—	—	—	—
2006	35,361	81.8	14.0	2.3	1.7	0.2	81.0
2007	32,135	81.7	13.6	2.5	1.9	0.2	80.1
2008	27,574	81.4	13.6	2.6	2.2	0.3	71.9
2009	26,108	81.0	13.7	2.7	2.3	0.3	68.7
2010	25,046	80.6	13.7	2.9	2.5	0.3	83.8
2011	23,576	80.5	13.5	3.1	2.7	0.2	85.7
2012	22,516	80.0	13.6	3.3	2.9	0.2	87.4
2013	25,200	82.3	11.7	3.1	2.7	0.2	88.5
2014	24,869	82.7	11.3	-	-	-	88.8
2015	24,154	82.6	11.3	-	-	-	-
2016	22,506	81.8	11.5	-	-	-	-
2017	21,754	80.6	12.6	-	-	-	-
2018	20,879	79.8	13	-	-	-	-
2019	23,810	79	13	-	-	-	-

== Leadership ==
On March 23, 2007, the Missouri State Board of Education ended its accreditation of the St. Louis Public Schools and simultaneously created a new management structure for the district. A three-person Special Administrative Board (SAB) was created, with members selected by the Missouri governor, the mayor of St. Louis, and the president of the St. Louis Board of Aldermen. Control was returned to the local school board on June 30, 2019. The current interim superintendent of the St. Louis Public Schools is Millicent Borishade, who was promoted from deputy superintendent by the school board in December 2024, following the firing of Keisha Scarlett in September 2024. The current seven member elected board consists of Donna Jones, Bill Haas, Katie Wessling, Susan Jones, Charli Cooksey, Dorothy Rohde Collins, and Natalie Vowell.

=== Superintendents ===
- George K. Budd (1839)
- Vacant (1840)
- Henry Pearson (1841–1842)
- Vacant (1843–1847)
- Edward M. Avery (1848–1849)
- Spencer Smith (1850–1851)
- John H. Tice (interim) (1851–1852)
- A. Litton (1852–1853)
- Charles A. Putnam (1853)
- John H. Tice (1854–1857)
- Ira Divoll (1857–1868)
- William Torrey Harris (1867–1880)
- Edward H. Long (1880–1895)
- Frank Louis Soldan (1895–1908)
- Ben Blewett (1908–1917)
- Carl G. Rathman (interim) (1917)
- John W. Withers (1917–1921)
- John J. Maddox (1921–1929)
- Henry J. Gerling (1929–1940)
- George L. Hawkins (interim) (1940)
- Homer W. Anderson (1940–1942)
- Philip J. Hickey (1942–1963)
- William Kottmeyer (1963–1970)
- Clyde Miller (interim) (1970–1971)
- Ernest Jones (interim) (1971–1972)
- Clyde Miller (1972–1974)
- Ernest Jones (interim) (1975)
- Robert Wentz (1975–1982)
- Ronald Stodghill (interim) (1982–1983)
- Jerome Jones (1983–1990)
- David J. Mahan (1990–1996)
- Cleveland Hammonds (1996–2003)
- Bill Roberti (2003–2004)
- Floyd Crues (2004)
- Pamela Randall-Hughes (2005)
- Creg Williams (2005–2006)
- Diana Bourisaw (2006–2008)
- John Wright (interim) (2008)
- Kelvin Adams (2008–2023)
- Keisha Scarlett (2023–2024)
- Millicent Borishade (2024–2025)
- Myra Berry (interim) (2025–Present)

== Schools ==
St. Louis Public Schools Denotes a magnet school Denotes a vocational school
Name	Type	Neighborhood	Opened
Adams	Elementary	Forest Park Southeast	1878
Ames	Elementary	Old North St. Louis	1955
Ashland	Elementary	Penrose	1911
Banneker School	Elementary	Midtown	1940(closed in 2005)
Beaumont	High	JeffVanderLou	1926 (closed in 2014)
Bryan Hill	Elementary	College Hill	1930
Buder	Elementary	Southampton	1921
Busch	Middle	St. Louis Hills	1953
Carnahan	High	Dutchtown	2003
Collegiate School of Medicine and Bioscience	High	Tiffany	2013
Carr Lane	Middle	Carr Square	1958
Central	High	Southwest Garden	1937†
Clay	Elementary	Hyde Park	1905
Cleveland	High	Southwest Garden	1937† (closed in 2021)
Cole	Elementary	Vandeventer	1931
Columbia	Elementary	JeffVanderLou	1930
Compton Drew	Middle	Kings Oak	1996
Cote Brilliante	Elementary	Greater Ville	1904
Dewey	Elementary	Hi-Pointe	1918
Dunbar	Elementary	JeffVanderLou	1913
Fanning	Middle	Tower Grove South	1907
Farragut	Elementary	Greater Ville	1906
Ford	Elementary	Hamilton Heights	1964
Froebel	Elementary	Gravois Park	1895
Gateway	High	The Hill	1992
Gateway	Elementary	Carr Square	1995
Gateway	Middle	Carr Square	1995
Gateway Michael	Elementary	Carr Square	1995
Hamilton	Elementary	Skinker–DeBaliviere	1918
Henry	Elementary	Columbus Square	1906
Herzog	Elementary	North Point	1936
Hickey	Elementary	Greater Ville	1966
Hodgen	Elementary	Gate District	1884
Humboldt	Elementary	Soulard	1910
International Welcome	Elementary	Gate District	
Jefferson	Elementary	Carr Square	1958
	Elementary	Northampton	1930
L'Ouverture	Middle	Gate District	1950
Laclede	Elementary	Wells–Goodfellow	1915
Langston	Elementary	Wells–Goodfellow	1964
Lexington	Elementary	Kingsway West	1995
Long	Middle	Bevo Mill	1924
Lyon at Blow	Elementary	Carondelet	1904‡
Mallinckrodt	Elementary	Lindenwood Park	1940
Mann	Elementary	Tower Grove South	1902
Mason	Elementary	Clifton Heights	1921
McKinley	Middle	McKinley Heights	1904
McKinley	High	Mckinley Heights	1904
Meramec	Elementary	Dutchtown	1911
Metro	High	Central West End	1997
Miller	High	Covenant Blu–Grand Center	2004
Monroe	Elementary	Marine Villa	1899
Mullanphy	Elementary	Shaw	1915
Nance	Elementary	North Point	2002
Northwest	High	Walnut Park East	1964
Nottingham	High	St. Louis Hills	1953
Oak Hill	Elementary	Bevo Mill	1908
Peabody	Middle	Peabody–Darst–Webbe	1957
Roosevelt	High	Tower Grove East	1925
Shaw	Elementary	The Hill	1908
Shenandoah	Elementary	Tower Grove East	1926
Sherman	Elementary	Shaw	1899
Sigel	Elementary	McKinley Heights	1906
Soldan	High	Academy	1909
Stix	Elementary	Central West End	1997
Sumner	High	The Ville	1910
Turner	Middle	The Ville	2007 (closed)
Vashon	High	JeffVanderLou	2002
Walbridge	Elementary	Walnut Park East	1924
Washington	Elementary	Fountain Park	1893
Wilkinson	Elementary	Franz Park	1921††
Woerner	Elementary	Bevo Mill	1932
Woodward	Elementary	Carondelet	1922
Yeatman–Liddell	Middle	O'Fallon	1967
†Both Cleveland NJROTC High School and Central VPA High School operate within the former Southwest High School building. ‡Lyon at Blow operates within the former Blow School building. ††Wilkinson School operates within the former Roe School building.

=== Photo gallery ===
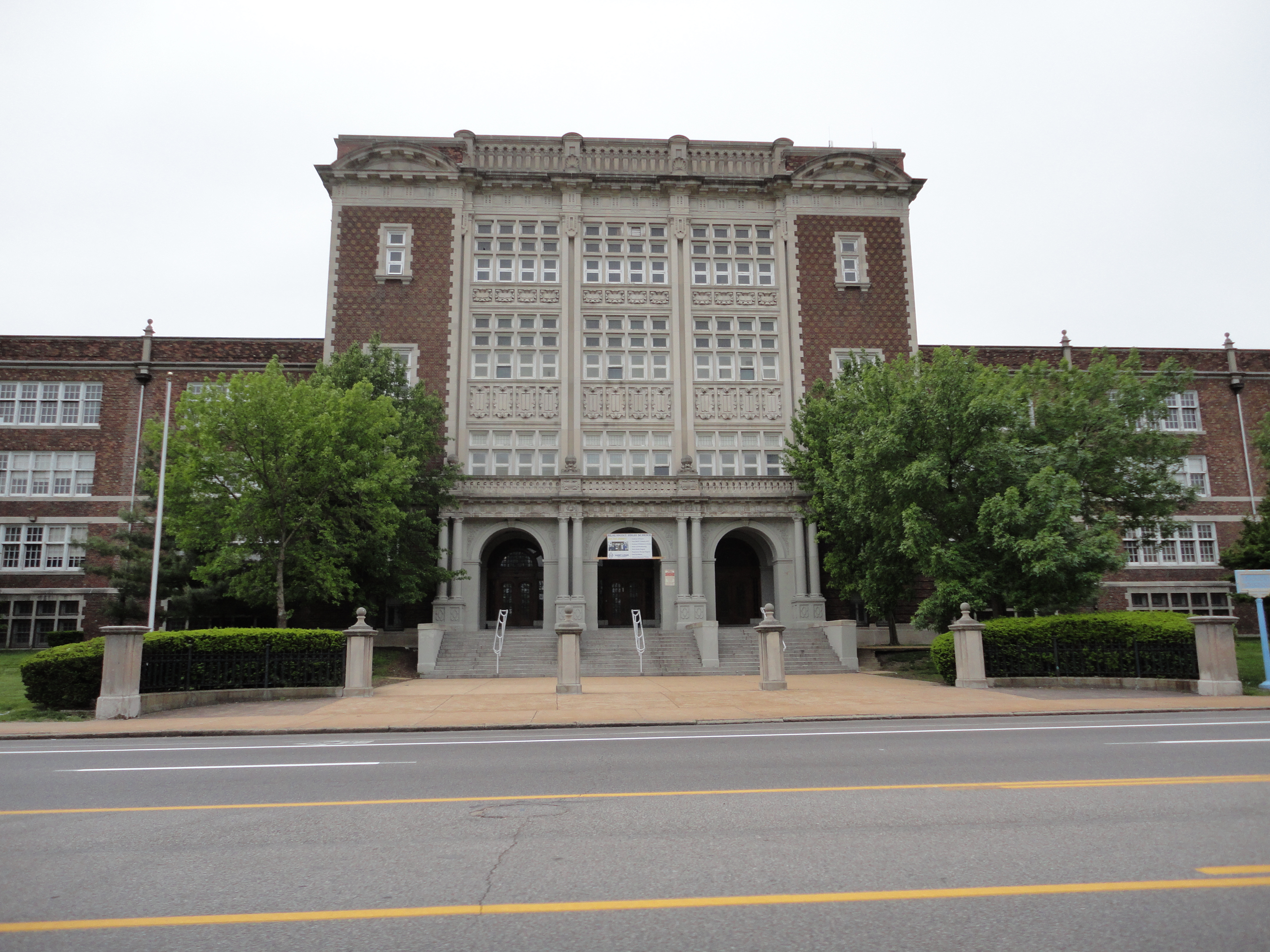
Beaumont High School

Carnahan High School of the Future

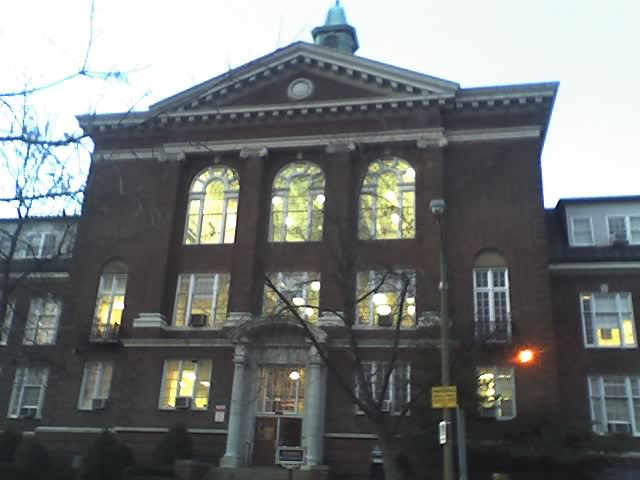
Sumner High School (St. Louis)

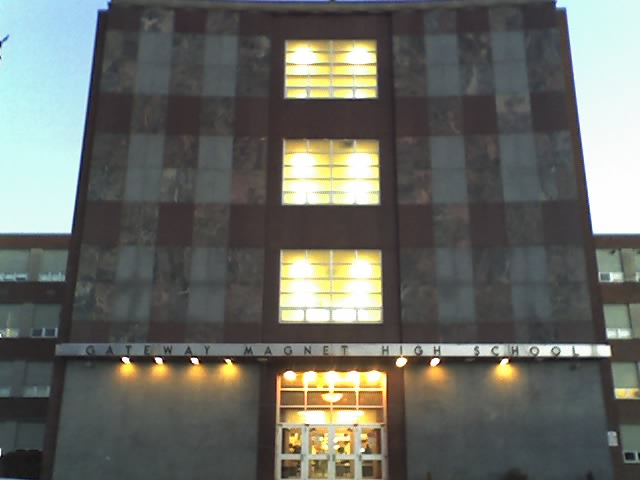
Gateway Institute of Technology

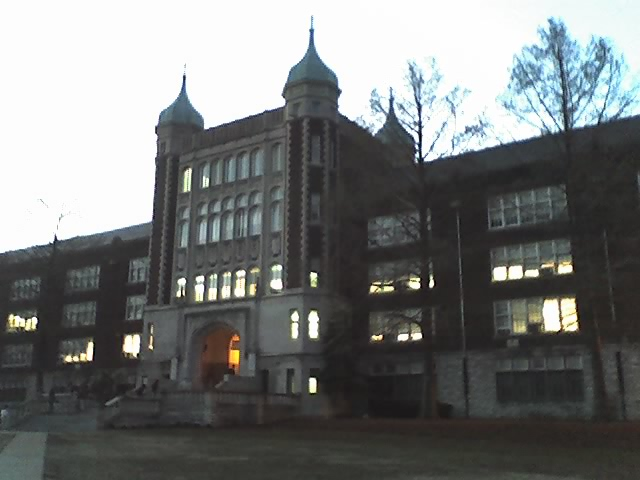
Roosevelt High School

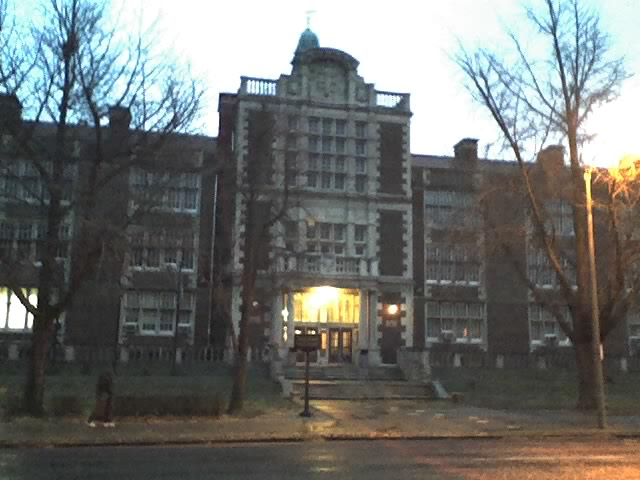
Soldan International Studies High School

Vashon High School

== See also ==
- School gardens and youth education
