= Berjon =

Berjon may refer to:

== People ==
- Saúl Berjón, the Spanish footballer
- Antoine Berjon, the French painter
- Robin Berjon, the computer scientist, editor of HTML5
