= Chris Lilley =

Chris Lilley may refer to:

- Chris Lilley (comedian) (born 1974), Australian comedian
- Chris Lilley (computer scientist) (born 1959), technical director, W3C
