= Technical Architecture Group =

Working group within the World Wide Web Consortium

- Abbreviation: TAG
- Formation: 2001
- Founder: World Wide Web Consortium
- Type: Nonprofit working group
- Owner: World Wide Web Consortium
- Website: tag.w3.org

The W3C Technical Architecture Group (TAG) is a special working group within the World Wide Web Consortium (W3C) created in 2001 to:

- document and build consensus around principles of Web architecture and to interpret and clarify these principles when necessary;
- resolve issues involving general Web architecture brought to the TAG;
- help coordinate cross-technology architecture developments inside and outside W3C.

The TAG consists of inventor of the Web and W3C director Sir Tim Berners-Lee, engineers elected by W3C member organizations, as well as participants directly appointed by Tim Berners-Lee.

== Role and deliverables ==
Today, the TAG's primary responsibilities are two-fold:

1. to conduct specification reviews ("design reviews") of new Web platform features, to ensure API design consistency, and respect for web users' security and privacy
2. to document the design principles of the Web platform, which is done in the Web Platform Design Principles document, the Ethical Web Principles document as well as various separate "Findings" documents. Notable past publications include Architecture of the World Wide Web, volume one (2004)

Google requires an approving TAG review for a Web platform feature to ship in Blink, Google Chrome's rendering engine. An approving review is also required for a W3C draft specification to be able to become a Recommendation.

While the TAG is a W3C working group, design reviews are not limited to W3C specifications. The TAG is often asked to review TC39, WHATWG, or IETF specifications as well.

== Participants ==
The current participants (as of February 2026) are:

1. Hadley Beeman (W3C Invited Expert, Chair)
2. Lola Odelola (W3C Invited Expert, Chair)
3. Jeffrey Yasskin (Google LLC, Chair)
4. Matthew Atkinson (Samsung Electronics Co.)
5. Marcos Cáceres (Apple Inc.)
6. Sarven Capadisli (W3C Invited Expert)
7. Xiaocheng Hu (Huawei)
8. Christian Liebel (Thinktecture AG)
9. Sen Yu (Ant Group)
10. Brian Kardell (Igalia)
11. Heather Flanagan (Spherical Cow Consulting)
12. Yves Lafon (W3C) (staff contact)
13. Tim Berners-Lee (W3C) (Emeritus Chair)

Despite some participants having a corporate affiliation, when participating in TAG meetings they are expected to act in their personal capacity to find the best solutions for the Web, not just for any particular network, technology, vendor, or user.

Notable past participants include:

- Roy Fielding
- Chris Lilley
- Tim Bray
- Dan Connolly
- Mario Jeckle
- T.V. Raman
- Larry Masinter
- Jeni Tennison
- Robin Berjon
- Anne van Kesteren
- Yan Zhu
- David Baron
- Lea Verou

== History ==
=== 2012 Reform ===
During its first decade, the TAG had a very different role and responsibilities than what it does today.

The primary focus of the first three years of the TAG was on documenting in a clear and easily understood manner the architectural foundations of the Web. The result was published at the end of 2004 as Architecture of the World Wide Web, Volume One. It is written in a relatively informal style, with illustrations, and many of its conclusions are expressed in succinct 'principles', 'constraints' and 'good practice notes', such as:

- Principle: Global Identifiers Global naming leads to global network effects.
- Good practice: Identify with URIs To benefit from and increase the value of the World Wide Web, agents should provide URIs as identifiers for resources.
- Constraint: URIs Identify a Single Resource Assign distinct URIs to distinct resources.

After this publication and until 2012, the work of the TAG primarily resulted in publishing Findings documents, centered around XML, RDF, and URIs.

In 2012, four prominent web developers felt that the TAG had become disconnected from the realities and pain points of web developers. Led by Alex Russell, they dubbed themselves "the reformers" and participated in the 2012 TAG election for four vacant seats. All of them got elected. It was only after this reform that design reviews of new specifications became a significant part of the TAG's work and the process for requesting a design review moved to GitHub and became streamlined.

=== First Party Sets Controversy ===
In February 2019, Google requested a TAG design review of their First Party Sets proposal as required per their shipping policy. The proposal was rejected by the TAG in 2021. The group's review concluded that "the First Party Sets proposal harmful to the web in its current form". This initially resulted in Google updating its timeline for removing third-party cookies and postponing it to 2023. Following further delays, Google completely abandoned its cookie deprecation plan in July 2024, opting instead to maintain third-party cookies while introducing new user-level privacy controls in Chrome.

This follows earlier public statements by the TAG about prioritizing user security and privacy when conducting design reviews.
