= Nottingham High School (disambiguation) =

Nottingham High School may refer to:

- Nottingham High School in Nottingham, United Kingdom
- Nottingham Girls' High School in Nottingham, United Kingdom
- Nottingham High School (New Jersey) in Hamilton Township, Mercer County, New Jersey, United States
- Nottingham High School (New York) in Syracuse, New York, United States
- High School tram stop on the Nottingham Express Transit
- Nottingham Community Access and Job Training School in St. Louis, Missouri, United States
