= Chris Lilley (computer scientist) =

British computer scientist

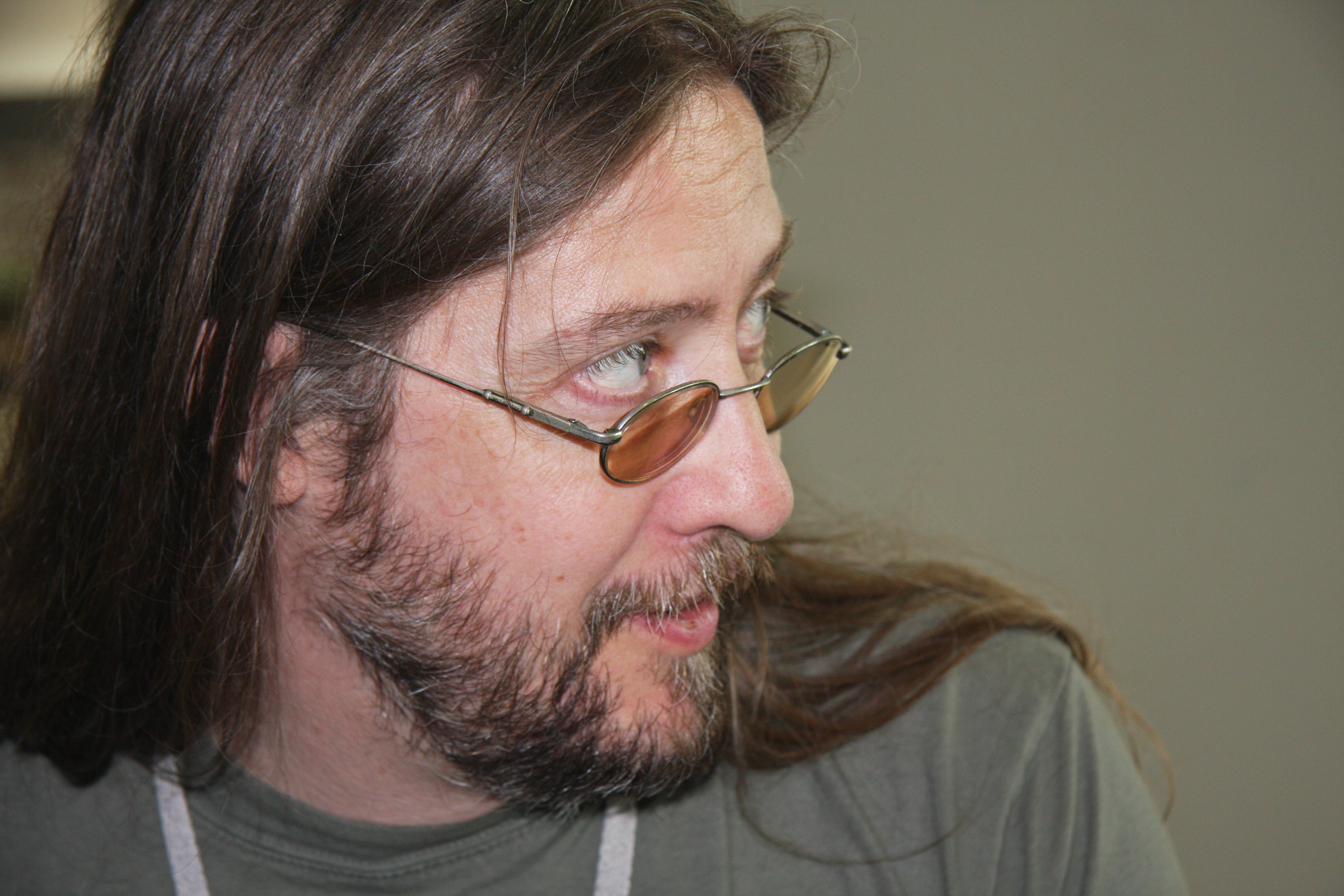
- Lilley in 2008
- Born: 31 December 1959 (age 66)
- Occupation: Computer scientist
- Employer: W3C
- Known for: SVG, PNG, HTML2, CSS2
- Website: https://svgees.us/

Chris Lilley (born 1959 in the UK) is a British computer scientist known for co-authoring the Portable Network Graphics (PNG) format, starting the Scalable Vector Graphics (SVG) format, and his work on HTML2, CSS2, and Web fonts.

== Education ==
Lilley was educated at Broxburn Academy in West Lothian, Scotland. In 1983, he obtained a bachelor's degree in Biochemistry at the University of Stirling, Scotland.

In 1990, he obtained a master's degree in Computing at the University of York.

== Career ==
After his bachelor's degree in Biochemistry he worked in Haematology and Blood transfusion at the hospital laboratories of Stirling and Falkirk for a few years before eventually switching to Computer Science.

Around 1990, he worked at the Computer Graphics Unit at the University of Manchester as a technical author and electronic teaching specialist in the field of Computer Graphics and Scientific Visualization. While at Manchester he was a member of the IETF Working Group on HTML, developing HTML 2.0, and was also one of the authors of the PNG raster graphics format. In 1994 he was a consulting student on the Biocomputing course run by the GNA's Virtual School of Natural Sciences, where he obtained a postgraduate diploma in Bioinformatics. In 1993 he presented a paper at the Eurographics Workshop on Graphics and Visualisation Education in Barcelona on the potential of the World Wide Web for technical education in Computer Graphics.

In 1994, he attended the First International World Wide Web conference, held at CERN in Switzerland. He presented a paper on Web Graphics at the Fourth International World Wide Web conference, held at Boston in December 1995.

In April 1996, he moved to Antibes, France to join the European branch of W3C with responsibility for Graphics and Fonts, joining a team including Håkon Wium Lie, Yves Lafon, Philipp Hoschka and Bert Bos. He chaired a working group developing Web Fonts, a technical activity which was later merged with CSS.

Early in 1997, the W3C HTML ERB was split into three Working Groups: the HTML WG, chaired by Dan Connolly of W3C, the DOM WG, chaired by Lauren Wood of SoftQuad, and the CSS WG, chaired by Chris Lilley of W3C. He was co-editor of CSS2, published in 1998.

In 1998, he was appointed as chair of the W3C Scalable Vector Graphics (SVG) Working Group, a position he held for ten years, until January 2008. He also joined the XML Coordination Group at W3C.

In December 2001, he was appointed at the Technical Architecture Group of the W3C, a position he held for three years until February 2005. He was a co-author of the Architecture of the World Wide Web, Volume One.

In April 2005, he joined the Compound Document formats (CDF) Working Group, became co-chair of the W3C Hypertext Coordination Group, and also took on managerial responsibility for HTML, CSS, SMIL, Timed Text, MathML, and VoiceXML.

In 2022 he was awarded a Technical Emmy for his work on web fonts.

He was an Associate of the Institute of Medical Laboratory Sciences, a member of the British Computer Society Electronic Publishing Specialist Group. He was on the executive board of Eurographics UK Chapter 1995–1996 and the program committee of the International Unicode conference, 1998–2003.

He currently holds the position of Technical Director, Interaction Domain at W3C.

== Bibliography ==
- Anderson, A.; Berjon, R. et al. (2006) Scalable Vector Graphics (SVG) Tiny 1.2 Specification. W3C Candidate Recommendation, 10 August 2006
- Jacobs, Ian; Walsh, Norm (eds)(2004) Architecture of the World Wide Web, Volume One. W3C Recommendation, 15 December 2004
- Lilley, C. (2003) Extending SVG Fonts with Graphite. In Proceedings of the 23rd International Unicode Conference.
- Diaz, A. et al. (2001) Component Extension (CX) API requirements Version 1.0. W3C technical report, 11 December 2001
- Lilley, C. (2001) SVG: Unicode meets Vector Graphics. In Proceedings of the 18th International Unicode Conference.
- Lilley, C. (2000) Internationalisation and Localisation with SVG in Proceedings of the 16th International Unicode Conference.
- Lilley, C. (1998) Rendering Multilingual Documents – CSS and XSL in Proceedings of the 13th International Unicode Conference.
- Bos, Bert; Lie, Håkon Wium; Lilley, Chris; Jacobs, Ian (1998) Cascading Style Sheets, level 2. W3C Recommendation, 12 May 1998
- Lilley, C. (1997) The Design of an International Web Font Extension for Cacading Style Sheets in Proceedings of the 11th International Unicode Conference.
- Lilley, C.; Platon, R. (1997) Use of CGM as a Scalable Graphics Format. W3C technical report, 18 June 1997
- Lilley, C (1995) Not Just Decoration : Quality Graphics for the Web. World Wide Web Journal 1(1): pp. 291–307, Boston, 1995.
- Lin F, Wyrwas K, Irwin J, Lilley C, Hewitt W T, Howard T L J, (1995) Geometry for Computer Graphics. Sheffield, UCoSDA. ISBN 1-85889-059-4
- Lilley, C. (1995) Active Web Pages. In Proceedings of the 1995 Eurographics UK Conference, Loughborough, 1995, pp 267–281
- Lilley, C; Lin, F; Hewitt, W.T.; Howard, T.L.J. (1994) The Design and Development of Distance Learning Materials for Graphics and Visualisation. In Eurographics Workshop on Graphics and Visualisation Education (GVE), Barcelona, 1993. Also reprinted in Computers & Graphics 18(3), pp. 269–275
- Lilley, C. (1994) An Introduction to Standardised Colour Measurement. in Proceedings of 12th Eurographics UK Conference, 22–24 March 1994 pp 163–177
- Lilley, C.; Lin, F.; Hewitt, W.T.; Howard, T.L.J. (1993) Visualisation 1: Graphical Communication. Sheffield, UCoSDA. ISBN 1-85889-027-6
- Lilley, C.; Lin, F.; Hewitt, W.T.; Howard, T.L.J. (1993) Colour in Computer Graphics. Sheffield, UCoSDA. ISBN 1-85889-022-5
- Lilley, C.; Lin, F.; Hewitt, W.T.; Howard, T.L.J. (1993) Standards for Computer Graphics. Sheffield, UCoSDA. ISBN 1-85889-017-9
