= Roosevelt High School (Missouri) =

American high school in St. Louis

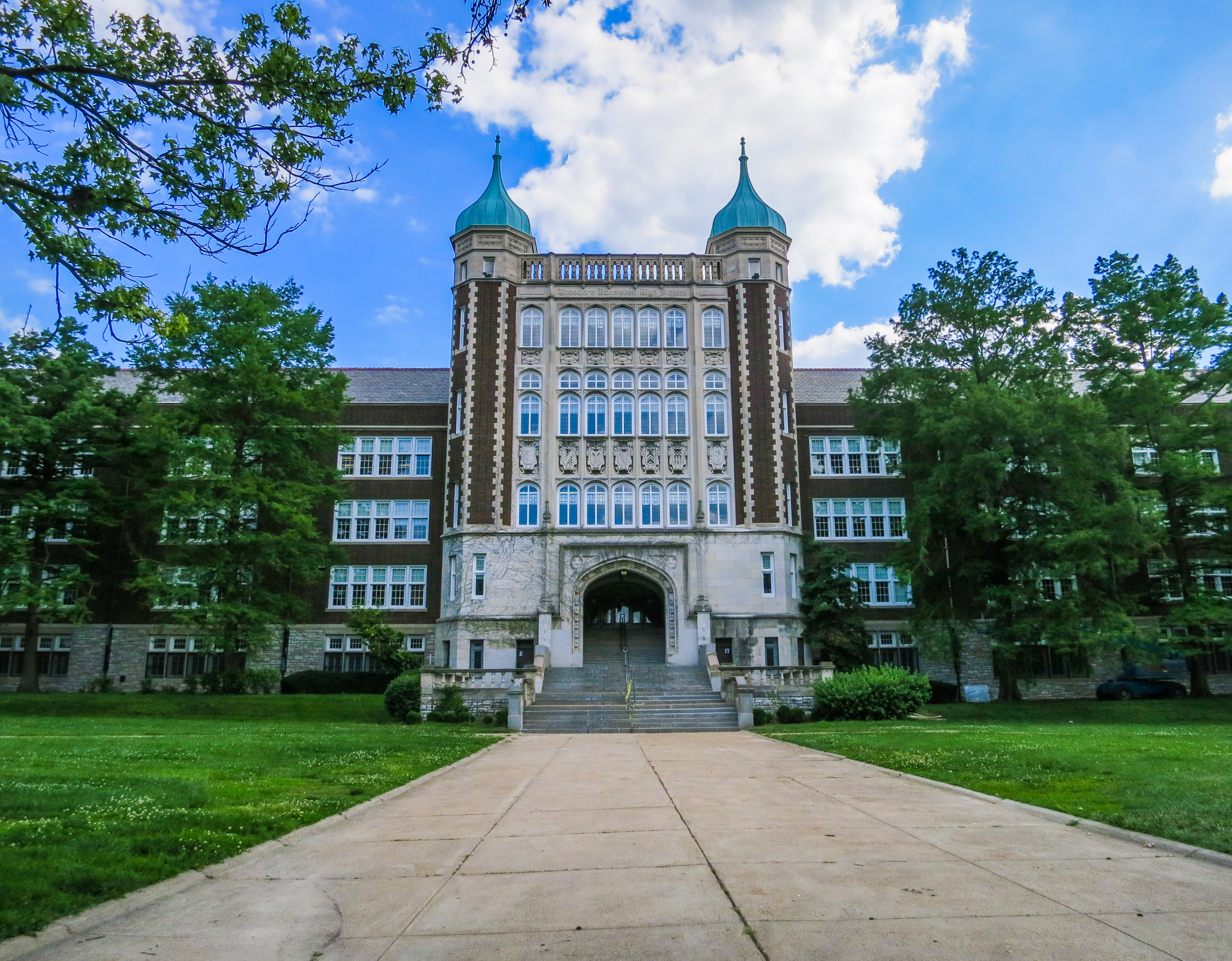
- Entrance to Roosevelt High School, June 2013

Location
- 3240 Hartford Avenue; St. Louis, Missouri 63118; United States; 38.6002°N 90.2368°W

Information
- Type: Comprehensive public high school
- Opened: 1925; 101 years ago
- School district: St. Louis Public Schools
- Superintendent: Kelvin Adams
- Principal: Enna Dancy
- Teaching staff: 60.85 (FTE)
- Grades: 9–12
- Enrollment: 734 (2024–25)
- Student to teacher ratio: 12.06
- Campus type: Urban
- Colors: Crimson and white
- Athletics conference: Public High League
- Nickname: Rough Riders
- Newspaper: The Rough Rider
- Yearbook: Yearbook, formerly Bwana
- Website: rhs.slps.org

Roosevelt High School is a public high school in St. Louis, Missouri that is part of St. Louis Public Schools. Roosevelt opened in 1925 after two years of construction and the evacuation of a cemetery for the building site. From the 1930s through the 1970s, Roosevelt served a predominantly white, ethnically German population, and among its graduates was Clyde Cowan, the co-discoverer of the neutrino particle. As a result of intradistrict busing in the 1980s and 1990s, Roosevelt served increasing numbers of black students, and it continues to be among the most integrated comprehensive schools in the district. During the late 1980s and early 1990s, Roosevelt operated a magnet school within its building as a small learning community; however, the magnet school operation shifted to Soldan High School in 1993. Despite a two-year renovation in the mid-1990s, Roosevelt has since suffered from academic and discipline issues, and its test scores and graduation rates remain below state averages.

== History ==
=== Construction and early years ===
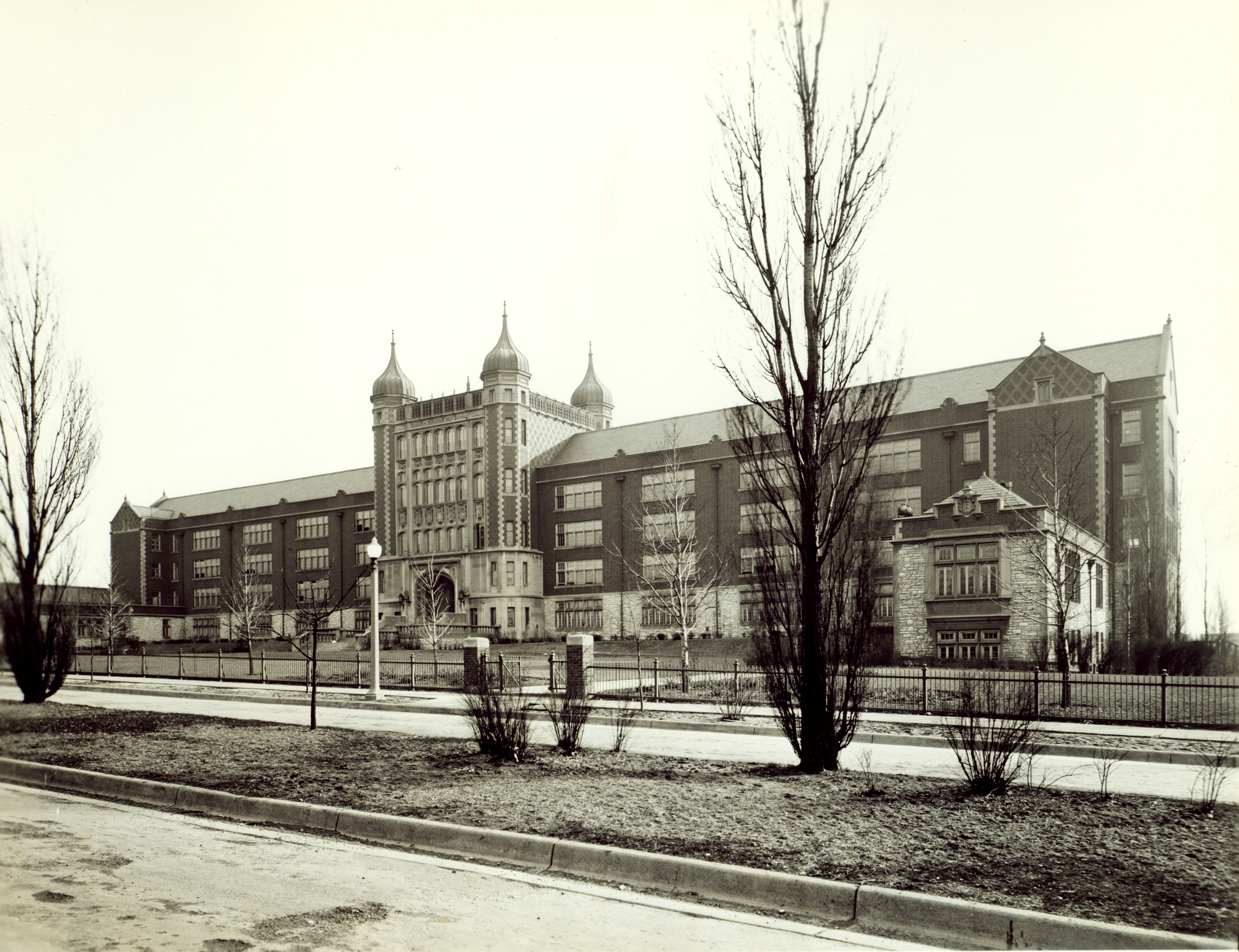
Roosevelt High School, 3230 Hartford Street, 12 February 1937

To relieve overcrowding at McKinley High School and Cleveland High School, the city's south side high schools for whites, the St. Louis Public Schools ordered the acquisition of property to construct a "New Southside High School" in 1922. Due to a lack of vacant land in the area, the Picker Cemetery (also known as Holy Ghost Cemetery) was acquired for the school's site, and evacuation of its graves began in October 1922. Most graves were relocated to mass graves in other cemeteries, although some remains were not relocated. During construction, neighbors reported dogs and children bringing home bones from the site, and workers reported finding jewelry and coffin handles while constructing the building. The building's cornerstone was laid on April 22, 1923, and the building was designed by R.M. Milligan at a cost of slightly less than $1.5 million.

The building opened to its first students on January 26, 1925, and it was officially named to honor Theodore Roosevelt. Most of its students and faculty transferred from McKinley High School, which was converted to a middle school from 1925 through 1932, and a smaller number of students transferred from Cleveland High School. Many school traditions and names relate to Roosevelt, such as its mascot (the Teddy Bear), its nickname (the Rough Riders), its original yearbook title (Bwana, in reference to Roosevelt's Swahili nickname), and its school colors and the melody of the school song are those of Harvard University, Roosevelt's alma mater.

From 1925 through the 1960s, Roosevelt served a predominantly white, ethnically German neighborhood, and due to school zoning, few black students attended after the integration of the St. Louis Public Schools in 1954. In the 1930s and 1940s, the Roosevelt boys' swim team won five state titles, and during the 1950s, students had a choice of seven musical instrumental groups. During the late 1970s, an increasing number of black students attended Roosevelt, although by the 1980–1981 school year, Roosevelt's student population remained nearly 70% white.

=== Busing and magnet school status ===
Starting with the 1980–1981 school year, the St. Louis Public Schools undertook a court-ordered busing program that transported black students from the north side of the city to predominantly white south side schools. At Roosevelt, the school's pom-pon squad greeted four buses of black students, who were accompanied by St. Louis Mayor James F. Conway. The racial demography of the school shifted from 30 percent black to 41 percent black under the plan. After busing began in 1981, the population of black students at Roosevelt continued to increase, and by the early 1990s, busing was no longer required to maintain an integrated status at the school.

During the 1980s, St. Louis Public Schools formed increasing numbers of magnet schools throughout the district. Among these was the Academy of Language and International Studies, which opened at Roosevelt in 1985 as a magnet school within the school. During renovations of Soldan High School, itself a magnet school, Soldan students were transferred to Roosevelt from 1990 to 1993. Upon the reopening of Soldan in 1993, however, its students returned to that school, and Roosevelt's magnet school academy was folded into Soldan. In addition, the Air Force JROTC program at Roosevelt also transferred to Soldan that year, Roosevelt returned to its status as a comprehensive public school. By the late 1990s, Roosevelt was the only comprehensive public high school in the city considered to be naturally integrated, with a population classified as 75% black, 17% white, 6% Asian, and 2% Hispanic.

=== Renovation ===
During the 1992–93 school year, Roosevelt students transferred to the Southwest High School building, which had closed two years earlier.

=== Discipline problems ===
In an effort to address mounting discipline problems at the school, administrators employed Montel Williams as a motivational speaker in late October 1990 to address the student body. Williams encouraged students to resist drugs and stay in school. Despite his visit, one week later a 16-year-old student shot at another student in the first floor of the building. In the spring of 1991 while on a tour promoting his film New Jack City, rapper and actor Ice-T also visited Roosevelt to speak to the students about similar subjects, encouraging students to stay off streets and remain in school.

In a further effort to deal with violence at and near Roosevelt, a federal grant provided funds for police at the school starting in the 1992–1993 school year. Missouri Governor John Ashcroft visited Roosevelt to announce the grant in January 1992, and he noted that 324 crimes had taken place at or within 1,000 feet of the school in the preceding year. According to state officials, it was the first use of full-time uniformed police at a public school in state history. In spite of the presence of police, in October 1992, a 16-year-old student was stalked and assaulted with a combination lock by a group of other students.

In October 1995, a teacher at Roosevelt was punched by a freshman student at the school, then suffered minor injuries when the student threw a computer monitor at him. The same school year, in February 1996, a school security guard was punched by a student in the cafeteria, then suffered injuries when the student assaulted the guard with an orange. The next year, in October 1996, two female students were stabbed in the chest and in the stomach at Roosevelt during a fight involving several students, and administrators were unable to explain how the students were able to bypass metal detectors with their knives.

In late 2003, a long-term substitute at the school was arrested and charged with child molestation after a 15-year-old student reported an incident of sexual assault. In January 2005, fighting at the school led to a series of shootings after school that left four students wounded. In October 2006, the school's homecoming dance was cancelled due to threats of violence, and the school was reported as being dominated by dozens of gangs. A St. Louis Post-Dispatch article noted that "by nearly every yardstick, Roosevelt High School in St. Louis is the problem child in a district that is itself troubled."

=== Academic issues ===
During the late 1980s, the dropout rate at Roosevelt High School exceeded that of the St. Louis Public Schools. In 1984, 515 students entered Roosevelt; by 1988, only 21.6% had graduated, while 14.2% had transferred to another school or district, 4.7% had withdrawn from school, 38.8% had officially dropped out, and an additional 20.8% did not return but did not transfer to another school or district.

Throughout the 1990s, Roosevelt suffered from significant and rapid turnover in its administration and faculty. From 1989 to 1999, it was led in succession by four principals and one acting principal, while a large number of faculty departed for Soldan High School when it reopened after renovations in 1993. By the late 1990s, the faculty at Roosevelt was aging, and a majority of staff were within five years of retirement as a result of seniority-based layoffs in the 1980s that eliminated most younger staff. In addition, aging staff frequently required long-term substitutes that were difficult to obtain and often unqualified.

In the late 1990s, Roosevelt also suffered from significant student turnover. At the beginning of the 1996–1997 school year, 1,493 students enrolled at Roosevelt; however, at the end of the spring semester, only 1,093 students remained enrolled. Of these, only 109 had been continually enrolled since the beginning of the year, and the school processed 1,327 withdrawals. Combined with relatively low attendance rates, classroom composition and consistency remained fluid throughout the period of the 1990s.

== Current status ==
As of the 2010–2011 school year, Roosevelt operates on an 8:05 am to 3:02 pm schedule. From 2006 to 2012, its principal was Terry Houston, who was named the 2008 Principal of the Year by the St. Louis Association of Secondary School Principals for promoting achievement, morale, and community relations.

=== Activities ===
For the 2010–2011 school year, the school offered fourteen activities approved by the Missouri State High School Activities Association (MSHSAA): boys and girls basketball, boys and girls cross country, boys and girls track and field, 11-man football, sideline cheerleading, boys and girls soccer, girls volleyball, wrestling, softball, and baseball. In addition to its current activities, Roosevelt students have won several state championships, including:

- Boys Swimming and Diving: 1939, 1940, 1943, 1944, 1947, 1957
- Boys Outdoor Track and Field: 1948
- Boys Indoor Track and Field: 1930

The school also has produced four singles tennis state champions.

=== Demographics ===
Enrollment, racial demographics, and free or reduced price lunches
Year	Enrollment	Black (%)	White (%)	Hispanic (%)	Asian (%)	Free/reduced lunch (%)
2011	1,003	76.8	10.5	5.4	7.4	76.9
2010	1,218	80.4	11.7	3.7	4.1	73.0
2009	1,365	82.8	11.0	3.1	3.1	55.2
2008	1,399	85.2	9.6	3.6	1.6	54.4
2007	1,490	83.5	10.4	3.8	2.3	67.9
2006	1,554	87.5	8.8	2.3	1.3	84.9
2005	1,527	80.7	14.9	2.2	2.1	80.5
2004	1,557	74.7	21.1	1.9	2.3	81.4
2003	1,896	72.4	24.2	2.0	1.5	89.3
2002	2,014	70.7	25.8	1.6	1.8	64.9

=== Academic and discipline issues ===
Roosevelt has a significant dropout rate; for the 2010–2011 school year, more than 50 percent of students dropped out compared to the Missouri state dropout rate of 3.4 percent. Roosevelt also has a significant discipline incident rate of 13.5 percent, more than seven times the average Missouri rate. Since the passage of No Child Left Behind in 2001, Roosevelt has not met the requirements for adequate yearly progress in either communication arts or mathematics. In addition, Roosevelt graduates average lower first and second semester grades during their first year in college than the average Missouri graduate, and as of 2010, more than 80 percent of Roosevelt graduates enrolled in a public university in Missouri required remedial coursework in either English or mathematics.

Graduation and dropout rates by year
Year	Graduates	Cohort dropouts‡	Graduation rate†	Total dropouts‡	Dropout rate†
2011	317	243	56.6	468	50.3
2010	267	282	48.6	411	39.1
2009	264	291	47.6		
2008	247	293	45.7		
2007	160	245	39.5		
2006	247	265	48.2	554	37.4
2005	220	174	55.8	314	20.7
2004	319	195	62.1	116	7.3
2003	227	254	47.2	248	12.9
2002	204	326	38.5	115	5.5
‡ Cohort dropouts is the number of students from the grade level graduating for that year who dropped out. † Graduation rate is calculated as number of graduates divided by number of graduates plus dropouts, multiplied by 100. ‡ Total dropouts is the number of students at the school who dropped out of school during that school year. † Dropout rate is calculated as number of total dropouts/(September enrollment plus transfers in and minus transfers out + September enrollment)/2).

Incident rates by year
Year	Enrollment	Incidents‡	Incident rate†
2011	1003	135	13.5
2010	1218	235	19.3
2009	1365	271	19.9
2008	1399	274	19.6
2007	1490	111	7.4
2006	1490	111	7.4
2005	1527	265	17.4
2004	1557	42	2.7
2003	1896	30	1.6
2002	2014	35	1.7
‡ Total incidents is the number of incidents in which as a result a student was removed for ten or more consecutive days from a traditional classroom. † Incident rate is calculated as enrollment divided by total incidents.

== Notable alumni ==
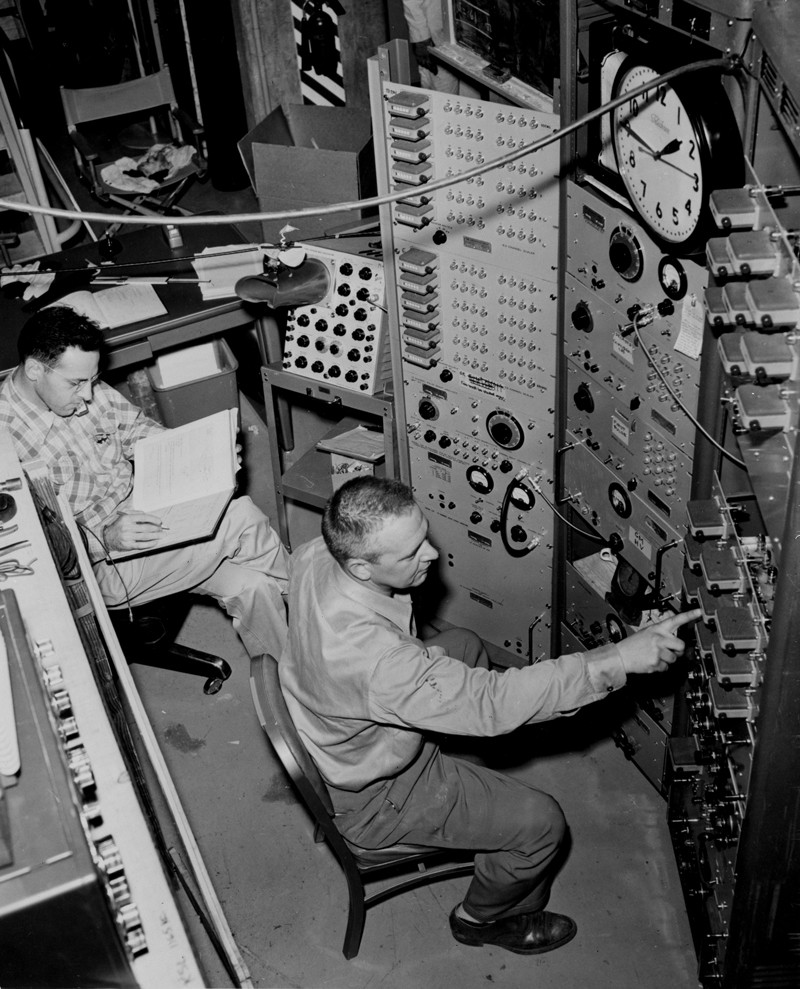
Clyde Cowan graduated from Roosevelt and later became the co-discoverer of the neutrino particle.

- Dick Ault, Olympic hurdler
- Harry Babbitt: Big Band era singer
- Stan Barrett: Stuntman who unofficially broke the sound barrier in a land vehicle, attended Roosevelt and the Missouri Military Academy
- Rudy Bukich: NFL quarterback
- James T. Conway: Four-star general and 34th Commandant of the Marine Corps
- Clyde L. Cowan: Co-discoverer of the neutrino
- Al Gerheauser: Former MLB pitcher in the 1940s
- Charles Guenther: Poet, translator, literary reviewer
- Dick Hantak: NFL official
- Vedad Ibišević: professional soccer player
- Bud Schwenk: NFL quarterback
- Johnny Sturm: Former MLB player (New York Yankees)
- James Thompson Stewart II: Lieutenant general in the United States Air Force
