= Metro Academic and Classical High School =

American magnet high school in St. Louis

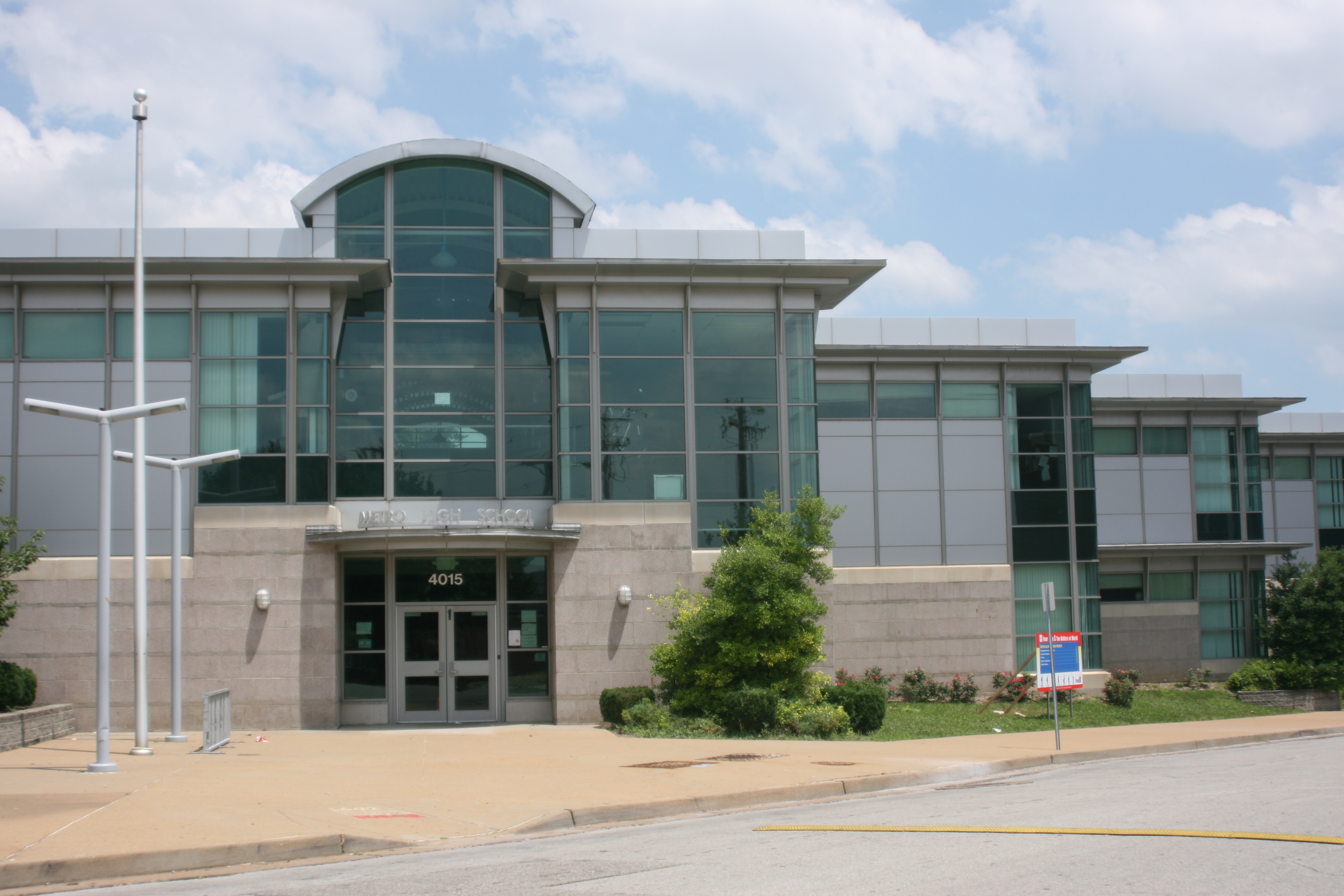
- Metro Academic and Classical High School

Location
- 4015 McPherson Avenue; St. Louis, Missouri 63108; United States; 38.6409°N 90.2432°W

Information
- Type: Magnet public high school
- Established: 1972; 54 years ago
- School district: St. Louis Public Schools
- Superintendent: Kelvin Adams
- CEEB code: 262994
- Principal: Tina Hamilton
- Teaching staff: 24.00 (on an FTE basis)
- Grades: 9–12
- Enrollment: 333 (as of 2023–24)
- Student to teacher ratio: 13.88
- Campus type: Urban
- Colors: Black and white
- Athletics conference: Public High League
- Nickname: Panthers
- Website: metro.slps.org

Metro Academic and Classical High School is a magnet public high school in St. Louis, Missouri, United States, that is part of the St. Louis Public Schools school district.

As of the 2018–19 school year, the school had an enrollment of 377 students and 24 classroom teachers (on an FTE basis), for a student–teacher ratio of 15.7:1. There were 374 students (99.2% of enrollment) eligible for free lunch and none eligible for reduced-cost lunch.

Metro is notable for being one of two International Baccalaureate World Schools in Missouri. Their IB Diploma Programme is coordinated by Sharleta Williams.

== History ==
Metro opened in 1972 in a five-room building at 2135 Chouteau Avenue as an alternative public high school. It became one of the first magnet schools in the St. Louis Public Schools district in 1981. In the early 1980s, the school moved to the Temple Israel building at 5017 Washington Place and in 1996, it moved to its current location in a purpose-built school building.

In 1997, the school's founder and principal, Betty M. Wheeler, retired (and, in 2022, the former Kennard Junior Classical Academy was re-named the Betty Wheeler Classical Junior Academy in her honor). Her replacement, Pamela Randall, served until 2003, when she entered district administration and later served as acting superintendent of the St. Louis Public Schools. Randall's replacement, Wilfred Doug Moore, was principal from 2003 to 2017, followed by Steven Lawler. In 2022, Lawler retired as the principal of Metro, and Dr. Tina Wallace-Hamilton became Metro's principal at the start of the 2022-23 school year.

All Metro students are required to perform 250 hours of community service prior to graduation, previously 200.

Metro has been ranked among the top public high schools by Newsweek and has won national and state-level awards for quality. For the 2003–2004 school year, Metro was named a Missouri Gold Star school and a national Blue Ribbon school. It was again named a Missouri Gold Star school and Blue Ribbon school in 2007–2008. In 2012, Newsweek ranked the school as 125 out of the top 1,000 public high schools in the United States. In 2016, the school earned the top scores for Missouri end-of-course exams in English, science, and social studies in the state. In May 2018, Metro earned the top ranking in the state. In May 2020, Metro was ranked #1 high school in the state of Missouri and #114 nationally by U.S. News & World Report. It has remained #1 in the state since. In May 2023, Metro was ranked #99 in National rankings.

== Notable alumni ==
- Sam Dotson, police commissioner 2012-2017 in St. Louis, Missouri
- Tracy Denean Sharpley-Whiting is a feminist scholar and Gertrude Conaway Vanderbilt Distinguished Professor of French in the Department of French and Italian at the Vanderbilt University College of Arts and Science.[1] She is also the Chair of African American and Diaspora Studies as well as Director of the Callie House Research Center for the Study of Global Black Cultures and Politics. She served as Director of the William T. Bandy Center for Baudelaire and Modern French Studies from 2006 to 2012.[2] She is editor of The Speech: Race and Barack Obama's "A More Perfect Union", and editor of the academic journal Palimpsest: A Journal on Women, Gender, and the Black International. [3] She is also series co-editor of "Philosophy and Race" (SUNY Press) with philosopher Robert Bernasconi. Sharpley-Whiting was a member of the 1985 graduating class of Metro.
- Yan Zhu, security engineer, open source contributor, Chief Security Officer at Brave Software.
- Kameron Saunders, dancer and choreographer, notably a backup dancer for Taylor Swift.
