= General Stuart =

General Stuart may refer to:

- Charles Stuart (British Army officer, born 1753) (1753–1801), British Army lieutenant general
- Charles Stuart (British Army officer, born 1810) (1810–1892), British Army general
- Charles Stuart (East India Company officer) (c. 1758–1828), East India Company major general
- J. E. B. Stuart (1833–1864), Confederate States Army major general
- James Stuart (British Army officer, born 1741) (1741–1815), British Army general
- James Stuart (British Army officer, died 1793), British Army major general
- John Stuart (British Army officer, born 1811) (1811–1889), British Army general
- Kenneth Stuart (1891–1945), Canadian Army lieutenant general
- Simon Stuart (general) (fl. 1990s–2020s), Australian Army major general
- William Stuart (British Army officer) (1778–1837), British Army lieutenant general
- James Fitz-James Stuart, 2nd Duke of Berwick (1696–1738), Spanish Royal Armies lieutenant general

== See also ==
- John Burnett-Stuart (1875–1958), British Army general
- General Steuart (disambiguation)
- General Stewart (disambiguation)
