= Yan Zhu =

American computer security engineer

- 朱颜
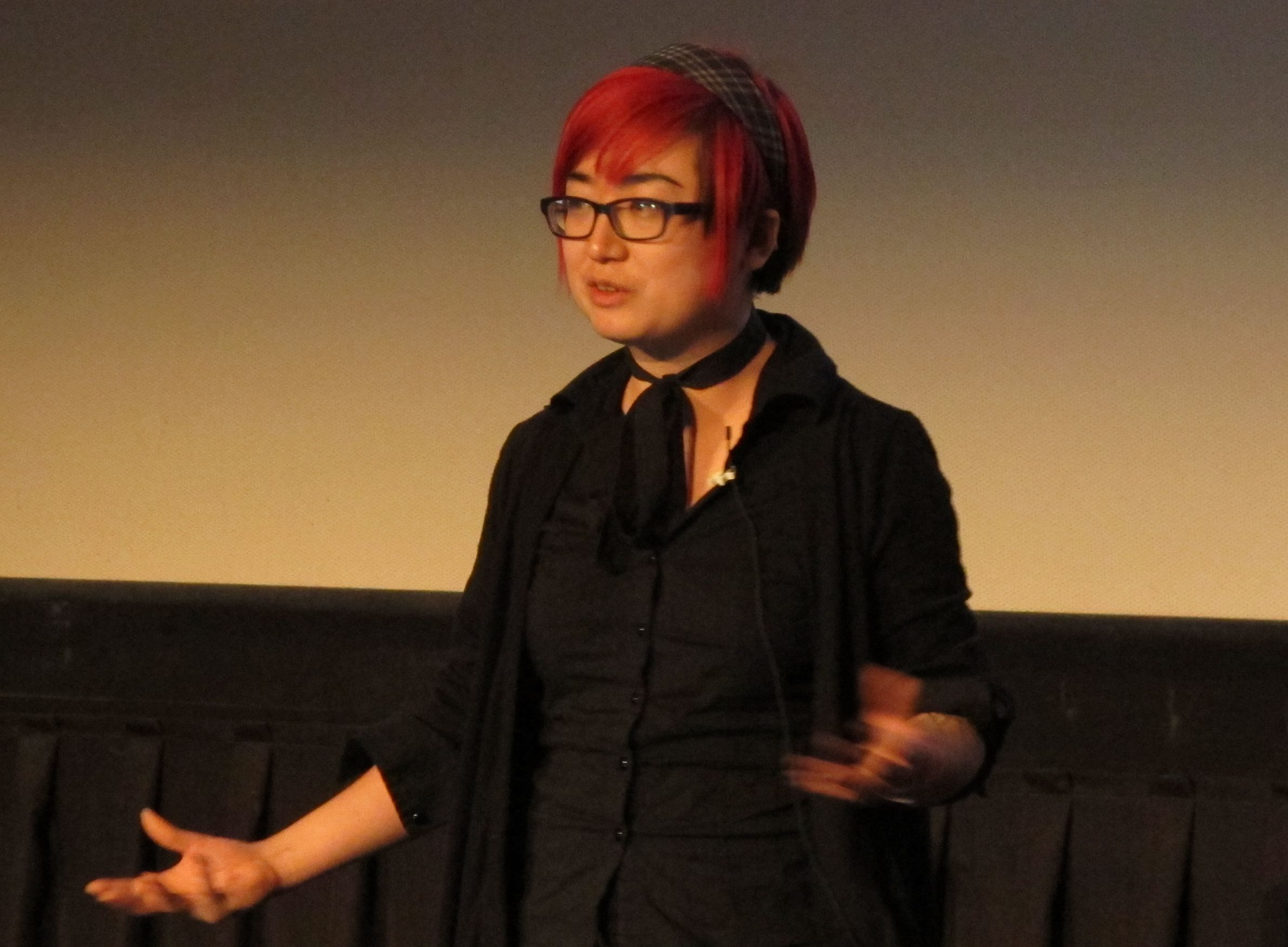
- Zhu in 2014
- Born: 4 May 1991 (age 35); Beijing, China
- Other name: @bcrypt
- Education: MIT
- Occupation: Computer security engineer
- Employer: Brave
- Website: azuki.vip

Yan Zhu (simplified Chinese: 朱颜; traditional Chinese: 朱顏; pinyin: Zhū Yán) is a security engineer, open web standards author, technology speaker, and open source contributor.

== Education ==
Yan Zhu attended Metro Academic and Classical High School in St. Louis, Missouri. She dropped out and earned a B.S. in physics at MIT. She enrolled as a National Science Foundation Graduate Research Fellow at Stanford University in experimental cosmology but dropped out after four months.

== Career ==
Zhu worked for Yahoo as a security engineer in 2014 and 2015. She is a fellow at the Electronic Frontier Foundation, and is currently the chief security officer and manages the security team at Brave Software. In 2015 she was one of Forbes 30 Under 30.

Zhu was on the W3C Technical Architecture Group in 2015 and is the editor of two W3C documents: the Secure Contexts web standard (2021) and End-to-End Encryption and the Web (2015), a W3C TAG finding that supports the use of end-to-end encryption for web communications.

Zhu has contributed to open source works including Brave, HTTPS Everywhere, SecureDrop, Privacy Badger for Firefox, and Tor Browser. As an independent researcher, in 2015 Zhu demonstrated security vulnerabilities in web browsers at the Toorcon security conference in San Diego. She was on the board of directors of the Zcash Foundation from 2017 to 2018 and Noisebridge in 2013.
