= Bob Broeg =

American sportswriter

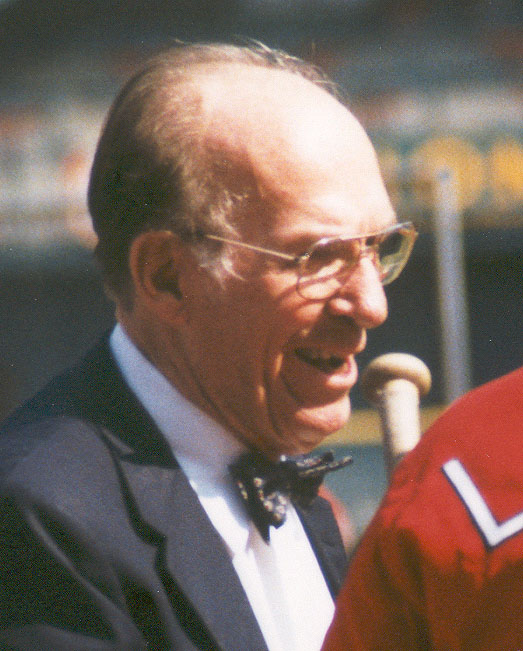
Bob Broeg, sports writer in St. Louis

Robert William Patrick Broeg (March 18, 1918 – October 28, 2005) was an American sportswriter and newspaper editor who covered the St. Louis Cardinals for the St. Louis Post-Dispatch for forty years.

== Biography ==
=== Early life ===
Broeg was born and raised in St. Louis, Missouri. He graduated from Cleveland High School in 1936 and the University of Missouri before entering the United States Marines. He served in Washington as a result of an eye injury suffered at birth.

=== Career in sports journalism ===
After the war, Broeg joined the St. Louis Star-Times and then the St. Louis Post-Dispatch in 1945. He was reportedly the most prolific writer in the history of the Post-Dispatch. He penned his final Post-Dispatch column in 2004.

He first covered the St. Louis Browns. He was privy to many important events in baseball history. Broeg was partially responsible for the famous picture of Eddie Gaedel at the plate in 1951. He told the photographer to stay at the game until Gaedel came to the plate and the picture was taken.

Later, he helped Bob Gibson win the 1967 World Series. Gibson was unable to get breakfast at the Cardinals' hotel in Boston, so Broeg delivered a ham and egg sandwich. Gibson pitched a complete, winning game.

Broeg is known for coining the nickname "Stan the Man" for Cardinal baseball player Stan Musial, working on the Hall of Fame causes of Cardinals Red Schoendienst, Enos Slaughter and Chick Hafey and helping to devise, and successfully push for the first pension plan for veteran major-league players.

Broeg published 20 books on sports. He also wrote a column for The Sporting News for decades.

Broeg was named to the board of directors of the Baseball Hall of Fame in 1972, a position he held for 28 years. He was also a longtime member of the Committee on Baseball Veterans.

=== Personal life, death, and legacy ===
Broeg was married first to Dorothy Carr; she died of cancer in 1975. He married Lynette Anton Emmenegger in 1977; she died in 2018. Broeg had no children.

Broeg said he wished his epitaph to read, "Hopefully, he was fair, as in just, not as in mediocre." After five years of health problems that included two strokes, Bob Broeg died several days after the final game of the 2005 World Series. He was 87.

The St. Louis chapter of the Society for American Baseball Research is named for Bob Broeg. He was awarded the J. G. Taylor Spink Award in 1979. He was elected to the National Sportscasters and Sportswriters Hall of Fame in 1997.

== Awards and honors ==
- 1964 Sportswriter of the Year award – Rockne Club
- 1969 University of Missouri Faculty Alumni Award
- 1971 University of Missouri journalism medal
- 1978 Missouri Sports Hall of Fame
- 1979 Cooperstown Baseball Writers Hall of Fame
- 1979 J. G. Taylor Spink Award – National Baseball Hall of Fame
- 1997 Sportswriters & Sportscasters Hall of Fame
- 1998 National Baseball Congress Hall of Fame

== Selected works ==
- Ol' Mizzou: A Story of Missouri Football. Strode, 1974.
- The Pilot Light and the Gas House Gang. Bethany Press, 1980.
- My Baseball Scrapbook. River City Publishers, 1983.
- Bob Broeg's Redbirds: A Century Of Cardinals' Baseball. River City Publishers, 1987.
- Baseball from a Different Angle. With William J. Miller. Diamond Communications, 1988.
- The Story of Stan Musial. The Sporting News, 1971.
- The St. Louis Cardinals Encyclopedia. With Jerry Vickery. Masters Press, 1998.
- Bob Broeg: Memories of a Hall of Fame Sportswriter. Sports Publishing LLC, 1995.
