= General Steuart =

General Steuart may refer to:

- George H. Steuart (brigadier general) (1828–1903), Confederate States Army brigadier general
- George H. Steuart (militia general) (1790–1867), Confederate States Army major general
- Sir James Steuart Denham, 8th Baronet (1744–1839), British Army general
- William Steuart (British Army officer) (1643–1726), British Army general

== See also ==
- General Stuart (disambiguation)
- General Stewart (disambiguation)
