= Anne van Kesteren =

Dutch open source contributor

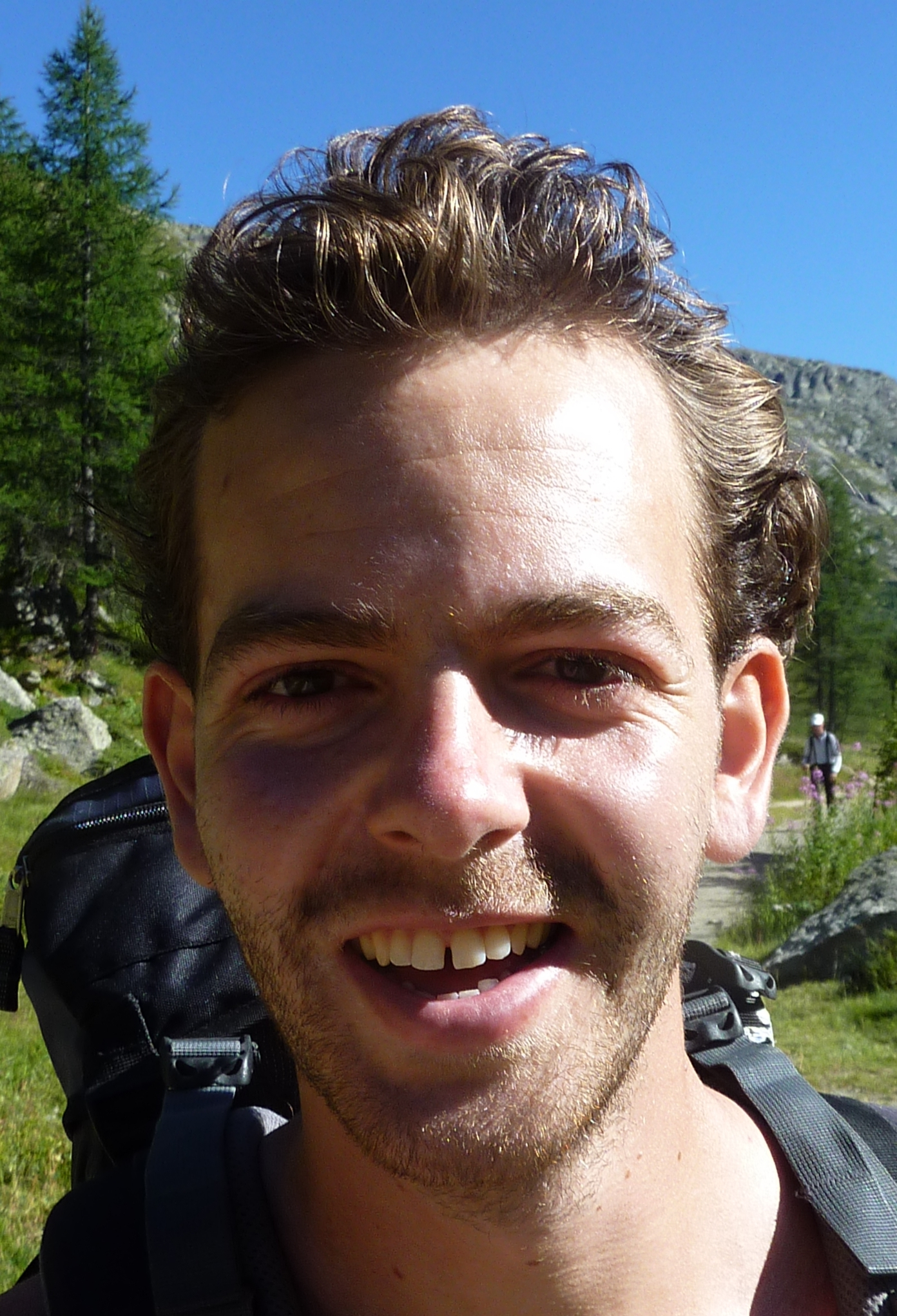
- Van Kesteren on 28 August 2011
- Born: 1 August 1986 (age 40); The Netherlands
- Occupation: web standards
- Website: https://annevankesteren.nl/

Anne van Kesteren is an open web standards author and open source contributor. He has written and edits several web standards specifications including Fullscreen API, XMLHttpRequest, and URL. Formerly worked on standards issues as a software engineer at Opera Software, he started working at Mozilla on 4 February 2013. He was Mozilla’s representative on the WHATWG Steering Group. He was an elected participant in the W3C Technical Architecture Group (TAG) from 2013 to 2014.

Since 2022, he is working at Apple on WebKit.

== Writing ==
Van Kesteren is the author and editor of several web standards:

- DOM Standard - defines a platform-neutral model for events and node trees.
- Encoding (web standard)
- Fetch (standard) - defines requests, responses, and the process that binds them: fetching.
- Fullscreen (standard) - defines an API for elements to display themselves fullscreen.
- HTML Living Standard (current co-editor) - foundational format of the Web
- Notifications (standard) - defines an API to display notifications to the end user, typically outside the top-level browsing context's viewport.
- Storage (web standard) - defines an API for persistent storage and quota estimates, as well as the platform storage architecture.
- URL (standard) - defines URLs, domains, IP addresses, the application/x-www-form-urlencoded format, and their API.
- XMLHttpRequest - defines an API that provides scripted client functionality for transferring data between a client and a server.

== Other work ==
Anne van Kesteren has contributed to open source works including:

- WebVTT parser and validator
