= Attorney General Stewart =

Attorney General Stewart may refer to:

- Sir John Stewart, 1st Baronet, of Athenree (1758–1825), Attorney General for Ireland
- William Morris Stewart (1827–1909), Attorney General of California

== See also ==
- General Stewart (disambiguation)
