= Carnahan High School of the Future =

Public magnet school in St. Louis, Missouri, US

Location
- 4041 S Broadway; St. Louis, Missouri 63118; 38.581753°N 90.229034°W

Information
- Type: Magnet high school
- Established: September 5, 2003 (as Carnahan Middle School); August 28, 2006 (as Carnahan High School of the Future)
- School district: St. Louis Public Schools
- Superintendent: Dr. Millicent Borishade
- Principal: Jonathan Griffin
- Teaching staff: 4.25 (FTE)
- Grades: 10–12
- Enrollment: 54 (2023-2024)
- Student to teacher ratio: 12.71
- Campus type: Urban
- Color
- Athletics conference: Public High League
- Sports: Baseball, Basketball, Soccer, Cheerleading, Football, Softball, Track and Field, Volleyball
- Mascot: Cougar
- Website: School web site

Carnahan High School is a high school located in St. Louis, Missouri, United States. It is a part of St. Louis Public Schools. It is named after Mel Carnahan, the 51st Governor of Missouri who served from 1993 to 2000, when he died in a plane crash.

== History ==
Carnahan High School of the Future sits in Dutchtown bordered by a park, a business district and a residential area. In 2011, the school was visited by Secretary of Education Arne Duncan, Secretary of Homeland Security Janet Napolitano, and Governor Jay Nixon.

== Academics ==
Carnahan ranked 43rd among Missouri High Schools. The school has 3 AP Classes: AP Language and Composition, AP Literature and Composition, AP World History. CHF has also sent a team to the Global Hack VI, an international computer coding competition and one of only 3 in SLPS to do.
