= Northwest Academy of Law =

Closed magnet school in St. Louis, Missouri

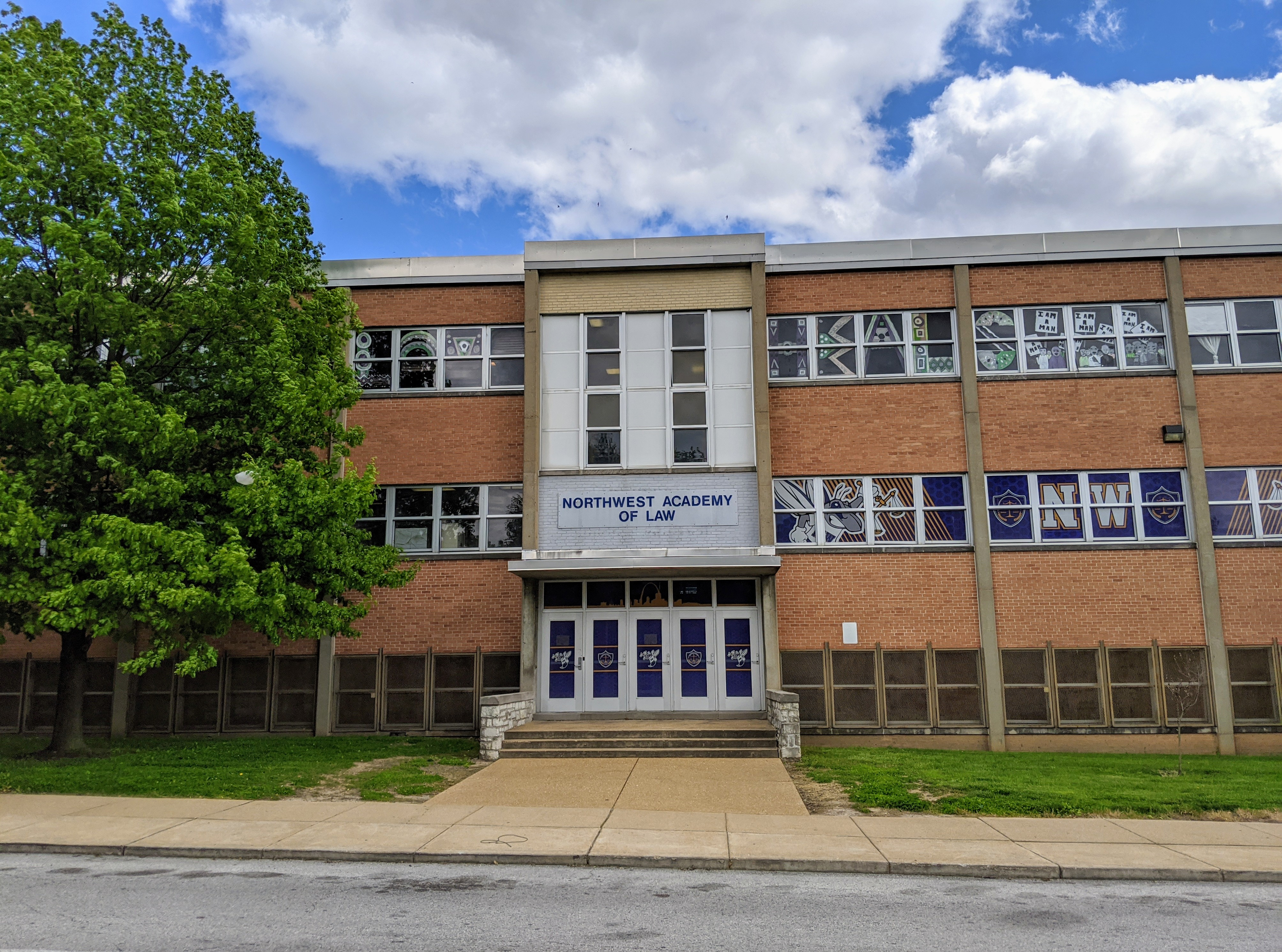

Location
- 5140 Riverview Boulevard; St. Louis, Missouri 63120; United States

Information
- Former names: Northwest High School; Northwest Accelerated Middle School
- Type: Magnet high school
- Opened: 1964
- Closed: 2022
- School district: St. Louis Public Schools
- Superintendent: Keisha Scarlett
- Principal: Christopher Crumble
- Grades: 9–12
- Enrollment: 194 (2018)
- Campus type: Urban
- Colors: Blue and gray
- Athletics conference: Public High League
- Sports: Baseball, Basketball, Soccer, Cheerleading, Football, Softball, Track and Field, Volleyball, Wrestling
- Nickname: Hornets
- Website: slps.org/northwest (archived)

Northwest Academy of Law was a magnet high school in the Walnut Park East neighborhood of St. Louis, Missouri. It was a part of St. Louis Public Schools, and closed in 2022.

== History ==
The school opened in February 1964 as Northwest High School. It was built in 1960 on the grounds of a former synagogue. The high school initially closed in 1992, and re-opened as a middle school in 1993. In the 2000s, Northwest was converted to a magnet high school.

The student body was made up of 194 students with around 95% being African-American in 2018. The average ACT score was 13.4 and the graduation rate was 70%. The mission of Northwest Academy of Law was to provide rigorous and relevant educational background particularly in Law to prepare students for success in college and in the workplace. Northwest held mock court sessions where students defend themselves when they are accused of breaking rules. In 2017, Northwest won its first state championship in basketball.

In January 2021, the SLPS board voted to close eight schools, including Northwest, at the conclusion of the 2020–21 school year. Northwest closed in 2022. The building was briefly occupied by a charter school following the closure, but has sat vacant since 2022.

== Notable alumni ==
- Carl Madsen, NFL official
