= David Baron (computer scientist) =

American computer scientist

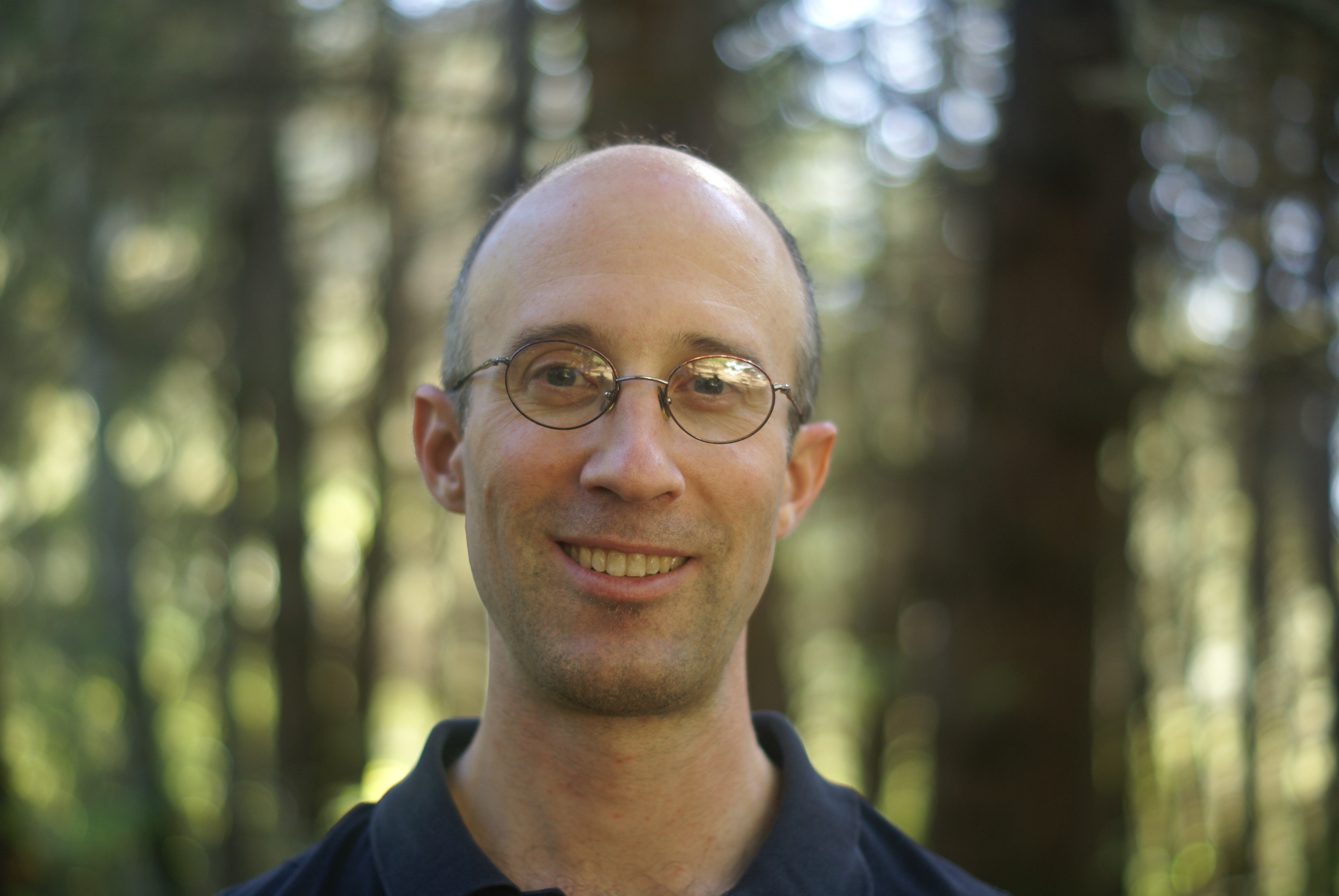
- David Baron in 2017
- Other name: L. David Baron
- Education: Harvard University
- Occupation: web browser engines
- Organization: Google
- Known for: CSS, Gecko rendering engine
- Website: https://dbaron.org/

David Baron is an American computer scientist, web browser engineer, open web standards author, technology speaker, and open source contributor. He has written and edits several CSS web standards specifications including CSS Color Module Level 3, CSS Conditional Rules, and several working drafts. He started working on Mozilla in 1998, and was employed by Mozilla in 2003 to help develop and evolve the Gecko rendering engine, eventually as a Distinguished Engineer in 2013. He was Mozilla’s representative on the WHATWG Steering Group from 2017-2020. He has served on the W3C Technical Architecture Group (TAG) continuously since being elected in 2015 and re-elected subsequently, most recently in 2020. In 2021 he joined Google to work on Google Chrome.

== Notable inventions ==
- Reftests — automated visual tests of browser engine rendering
- CSS animations implementation in Gecko

== Writing ==
Baron is the author and editor of several W3C web standards:

- CSS Color Module Level 3 Recommendation
- CSS Conditional Rules Module Level 3 Candidate Recommendation
- CSS Animations Level 1 Working Draft
- CSS Overflow Module Level 3 Working Draft
- CSS Transitions Working Draft

Baron was also a technical reviewer of the book "Transitions and Animations in CSS: Adding Motion with CSS".
