= HTML Working Group =

Group of workers

The HTML Working Group was an Internet Engineering Task Force (IETF) working group from 1994 to 1996, and a World Wide Web Consortium (W3C) working group from 1997 to 2015.

The working group was co-chaired by Paul Cotton, Sam Ruby, and Maciej Stachowiak.

== Members ==
Members of the HTML Working Group included representatives from the following organizations:

- Adobe Systems Inc.
- Apple
- Google, Inc.
- HP
- Microsoft
- Mozilla
- Opera Software

W3C had also invited several experts to collaborate with the working group including:

- Robin Berjon (past editor for the HTML5 and DOM4 specifications)
- Marcos Cáceres
- Ian Devlin
- Steve Faulkner
- John Foliot
- Jeremy Keith
- Martin McEvoy
- Janina Sajka
- David Sleight
- Manu Sporny
- Oli Studholme

== Internal working system ==
The HTMLWG had members from a diverse community such as content providers, content authors, and anyone interested in the work on HTML.

=== Participation ===
To participate in the group, the steps involved having a W3C account and filling out a form for copyright, content etc. policies. Steps are different for people who are affiliated with W3C Member organization and those who are not.

=== Communication methods ===
- Mailing lists (used to organize activities such as task-force discussions and working-group administrative purposes)
- HTML-WG Channel (for weekly telcons and informal discussions)

=== Meetings ===
- Weekly telcons (On Thursday and Tuesday)
- Face-to-face (twice a year, and the latest one was held in San Jose, on April 8–9, 2014)

See HTML/wg/WorkMode for more details about the way a member can participate in, responsibilities of Editor, various types of meetings that members can attend, etc.

=== Interest Groups ===
To encourage broad participation, three locale-based interest groups were set up: the Chinese, Japanese and Korean Interest Groups. The HTML5 Chinese Interest Group had over 1000 members.

== History ==
The creation of an HTML Working Group was first proposed at the 30th Internet Engineering Task Force (IETF) meeting in Toronto, on 26 July 1994. The Group was founded with the adoption of its charter in September 1994 and was chaired by Eric Sink.

The IETF HTML Working Group oversaw the creation and publication of RFC 1866 in November 1995, the document which defines HTML 2.0. The Group also published RCF 1942 in May 1996, a document which provides an experimental description of an extended set of HTML tables.

The IETF Group was dissolved in September 1996.

=== Change in working direction ===
In 1999, W3C released HTML 4.01 and then stopped continuing the evolution of HTML, as the W3C's HTMLWG announced it would change their direction to exploitation of XML-based version of HTML (named XHTML 2.0), which has a stricter standard.

The traditional version of HTML allowed uncertainties in code review, which means even there are some mistakes in the web pages, browser will still display the contents through error detection and correction. "Nowadays, there would be at least one mistake existing in over 99% HTML web pages. " estimated by the Google senior programmer Mark Pilgrim.

The W3C HTMLWG hoped to boost a more regulated development of the future of the Internet through rigorous standards. While the popularization and application of XHTML had not received many responses from the public.

=== Collaboration ===
In 2004, Mozilla and Opera put forward a plan based on HTML 4, as they wanted to continue the evolution of HTML. The plan was not passed. Then they decided to form WHATWG, in order to pursue the future of HTML along with W3C’S HTMLWG but in different direction.

In 2006, WHATWG made a breakthrough while XHTML 2.0 was still impractical. As a result, Tim Berners-Lee, the inventor of W3C announced that the W3C's HTMLWG would stop to jointly develop HTML5 with WHATWG. Ian Hickson was responsible for both editing the two groups' specifications.

In October 2009, W3C dismissed the XHTML 2 group.

=== Split ===
In July 2012, W3C's HTMLWG and WHATWG officially parted ways about working on HTML5. WHATWG evolved HTML5 and W3C worked on a more static "snapshot". Therefore, there are two versions of HTML5 - one is a "living standard" and the other one is "snapshots". The split between two bodies was due to conflicts.

Regarding fears of this split from the public, then head of WHATWG, Ian Hickson said the split would not be as harmful as people thought. "It's certainly possible that the specs will fork, but it's unlikely, or at least, unlikely to happen in a way that is harmful." In his opinion, possible conflicts will lead to a more precise standard. And "Browser vendors will just know to use the more precise one."

== Differences between WHATWG and HTMLWG ==
WHATWG maintains a living standard and stopped using version numbers. W3C's HTMLWG leaves the WHATWG spec in order to stick producing snapshots.

== See also ==
About the HTMLWG, a brief summary of HTMLWG.
