= Dan Connolly (computer scientist) =

American computer scientist

- Born: 1967 (age 58–59)
- Education: University of Texas at Austin
- Occupation: Computer scientist
- Website: www.w3.org/People/Connolly/

Dan Connolly (born 1967) is an American computer scientist who was closely involved with the creation of the World Wide Web as a member of the World Wide Web Consortium (W3C).

== Early years and education ==
Connolly was born in 1967 and grew up with four siblings in Prairie Village, in the Kansas City metropolitan area, where he attended Bishop Miege High School. From 1986 to 1990 he attended University of Texas at Austin, earning a B.S. in computer science.

== Career ==
In October 1991, Connolly was working on the documentation tools team at Convex Computer when he joined the Web project's mailing list to discuss the browser he had written for the X Window System. Soon after he started advocating for HTML to adopt an SGML document type definition. He met Tim Berners-Lee and Robert Cailliau at the HyperText conference in San Antonio, TX, in December 1991. With Berners-Lee he was co-editor of the initial Internet Engineering Task Force's draft specification for HTML. He was also the principal editor of the HTML 2.0 specification and co-created one of the early HTML validators. Moving from Texas to Boston in 1994, he joined the newly created World Wide Web Consortium (W3C) at the Massachusetts Institute of Technology, where Connolly took a position as research scientist at the Laboratory for Computer Science. He stayed in Boston for two years before returning to Texas while continuing to work for W3C as a remote worker.

Connolly chaired the W3C's HTML Working Group that produced the HTML 3.2 and HTML 4.0 specifications. Together with Jon Bosak he formed the W3C XML Working Group that created the W3C XML 1.0 Recommendation.

Connolly chaired the first RDF Data Access Working Group, and served on the W3C Technical Architecture Group and the first Web Ontology Working Group. He was involved in the application of RDF in calendar software.

His research interests include investigating the value of formal descriptions of chaotic systems like the Web, particularly in the consensus-building process, and the Semantic Web. He is mentioned in Tim Berners-Lee's book, Weaving the Web, where he is referred to as an expert in web technology, hypertext systems, and markup languages.

In June 2010, Dan left the W3C and took a position with University of Kansas School of Medicine as a Biomedical Informatics Software Engineer in their Department of Biostatistics. As of 2021, he works as a software engineer for Agoric.
