= Cleveland Junior Naval Academy =

Magnet high school in Missouri, US

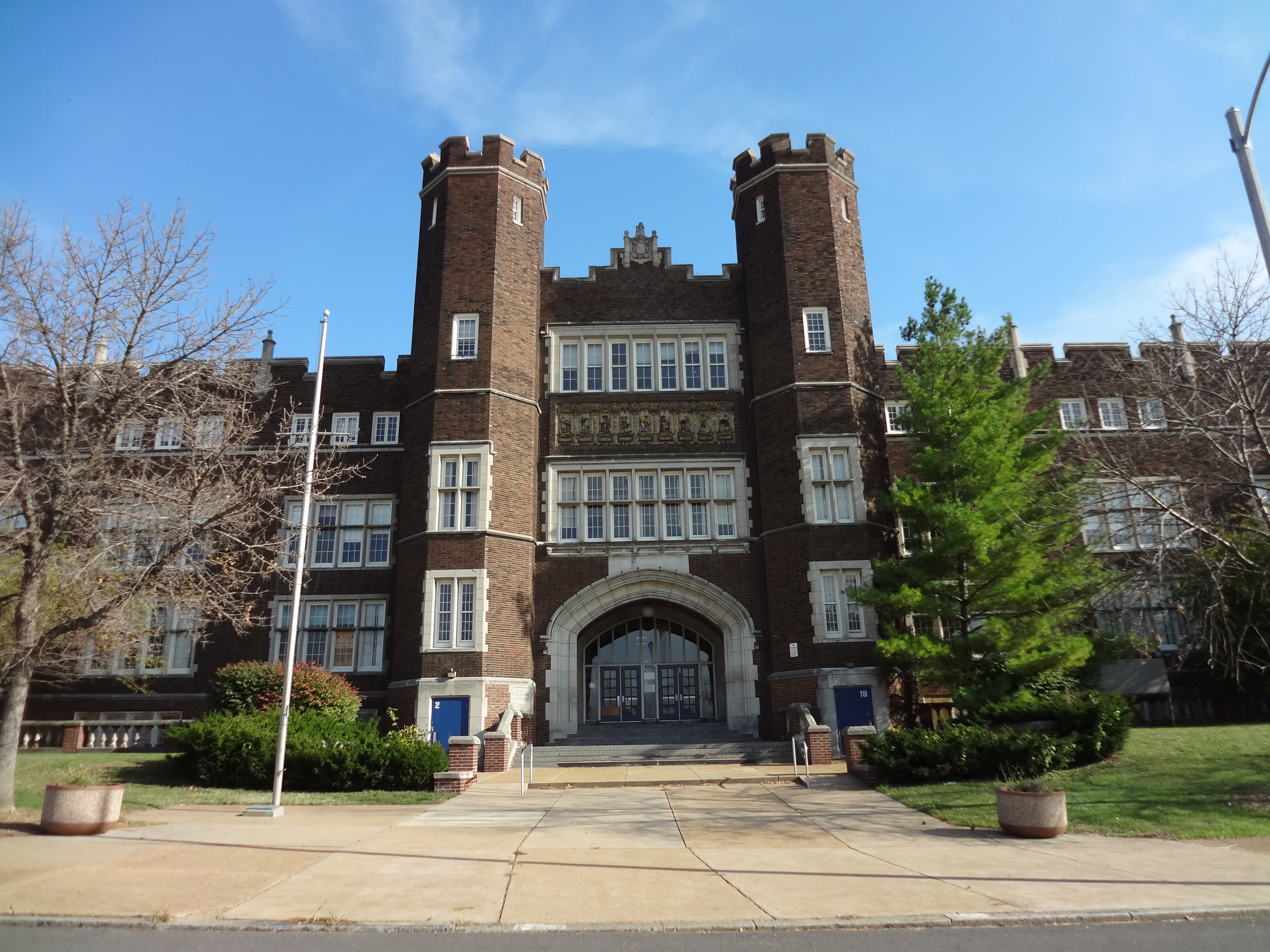
- Exterior of Cleveland Junior Naval Academy, October 2011

Location
- 4939 Kemper Avenue; St. Louis, Missouri 63139; United States; 38.6046°N 90.2710°W

Information
- Type: Magnet high school
- Established: 1915
- Closed: 2021
- School district: St. Louis Public Schools
- Superintendent: Kelvin Adams
- Principal: Susan Viviano
- Faculty: 22.00 (FTE)
- Grades: 9–12
- Enrollment: 251 (2019–20)
- Student to teacher ratio: 11.41
- Campus type: Urban
- Colors: Blue and gold
- Mascot: Pegleg Pete
- Team name: Commanders
- Website: School web site

Cleveland Junior Naval Academy (also known as Cleveland High School) was a magnet military academy high school in St. Louis, Missouri, and was a part of the St. Louis Public Schools.

== History ==
Cleveland High School opened in 1915 as a comprehensive high school, merging with the Junior Naval Academy in 1984. The Junior Naval Academy was a magnet military academy, founded in 1981. In 2006, the school moved from its original location on Louisiana Avenue (38.5777°N 90.2429°W) to the Pruitt Military Academy building on North 22nd Street, then, in 2010, it moved from Pruitt to the Southwest High School building at Arsenal and Kingshighway. In 2021, the St. Louis Public Schools board voted to close the location effective the upcoming school year.

In 2026, the Louisiana Avenue campus was sold to a development agency for $300,000.

== Events and celebration ==
- Homecoming was a traditional homecoming festival, including a football game, parade, and dance. The parades were held on Saturday morning of the weekend designated for the homecoming football game. The parade route was usually in the school's neighborhood. The dance was held that same Saturday, in the Field House, one of Cleveland High School's old buildings.

- Pass-in-Review was an event held in the spring, usually near the end of April. The event began with a visitation by a high ranking Navy Officer, who spent a couple of days inspecting the individual platoons in the regiment. On the Friday after the Regimental Inspection, the Regiment was formed up on the nearby parade ground to perform the various procedures (i.e. Report-in, Parade the Colors, Guest Speaker, Drill Teams etc.) The ceremony commenced with the regiment parading past the military and civilian dignitaries in the review stand.
- Naval Ball was held in May. The Naval Ball was the school's version of a Prom, and was open to all Cadets (Freshmen, Sophomores, Juniors, and Seniors.) Male cadets wore the Military Service Dress Uniform. Female cadets wore the military service Dress Uniform, or they had the option of wearing formal dresses or gowns.

=== Special activities ===
As a Navy Junior Reserve Officers' Training Corps NJROTC unit, cadets were offered many experiences that were only offered through the NJROTC program.

- During the spring of their freshman year, Delta cadets could have attended a 5-day training course in Tullahoma, TN called Mini-Boot Camp. Mini-Boot Camp emphasizes one must be a good follower to be a good leader. Cadets received two ribbons after completion.
- During the summer break between their freshman and sophomore years, cadets were offered a 3-week course called Platoon Commander and MAA school. Cadets were taught the fundamentals of drill and small group leadership. Most cadets that completed this course went on to be platoon commanders or Master at Arms.
- During the summer break between sophomore and junior years, SELECT cadets were offered to go to the Area Nine Leadership Academy in Tullahoma, TN. This was the most prestigious and honorable course offered. Cadets were taught all of the essentials of being a leader. They were taught drill with swords and guide-ons, military courtesy, proper procedures for military banquets, leadership skills, emphasis on physical fitness etc. Cadets who attended were the top cadets in their unit. Normally, Cleveland would send five to eight cadets. In general, NJROTC cadets that attended became the commanding and executive officers of their units. Upon completion of Leadership Academy, cadets were rewarded the silver aigrette which was the only aigrette nationally recognized by the NJROTC program.

== Athletics ==
For the 2011–2012 school year, the school offered 17 activities approved by the Missouri State High School Activities Association (MSHSAA): baseball, boys and girls basketball, sideline cheer leading, boys and girls cross country, 11-man football, boys and girls soccer, softball, boys and girls tennis, boys and girls track and field, girls volleyball, wrestling, and speech and debate. In addition to its current activities, Cleveland students have won several state championships, including:

- Baseball: 1958
- Boys Basketball: 1953
- Girls Basketball: 1983
- Boys Cross Country: 1949
- Boys Swimming and Diving: 1942, 1948, 1955

The school also has produced two individual wrestling state champions.

== Notable alumni ==
- Bennie Anderson: American football offensive guard, played for the Miami Dolphins
- Bob Broeg, journalist, baseball Hall of Fame inductee
- Bob Ferry, professional basketball player, assistant coach, and general manager in the NBA
- Harry Keough: member of the United States men's national soccer team
- Phyllis Smith: film and television actress, played Phyllis Lapin-Vance on The Office
- Lou Thesz: Professional wrestler, NWA World Heavyweight Champion, member of the freestyle wrestling team
