= Carl Madsen (American football) =

American football official (1949–2021)

No. 92
- Position: Umpire, replay official

Personal information
- Born: December 30, 1949; St. Louis, Missouri, US
- Died: October 24, 2021 (aged 71); Nashville, Tennessee, US

Career information
- High school: Northwest (St. Louis, Missouri)
- College: WashU (1968–1971); UNC

Career history
- National Football League (1997–2021); Umpire (1997—2008); Replay official (2009—2021)

Awards and highlights
- AFC Championship Game (2018, 2019); Pro Bowl

Other information
- Military career
- Branch: United States Air Force
- Service years: 1973–1976
- Rank: 2Lt

Carl A. Madsen (December 30, 1949 – October 24, 2021) was an American football official in the National Football League for 24 years. He was an umpire (U) before becoming a replay official. He wore uniform number 92.

== Early life ==
Carl Madsen was born December 30, 1949 to Louis and Josephine Madsen in St. Louis, Missouri. He grew up in St. Louis, and had a brother. He graduated from Northwest High School in 1968, where he played football, basketball, and baseball, before attending Washington University on an academic scholarship. He was a pitcher for the Washington University Bears.

While studying at WashU, Madsen enrolled as a Second Lieutenant in the ROTC and served with the US Air Force from 1973 to 1976.

Before he joined the NFL’s officiating staff in 1997, Madsen was a high school basketball referee with the MSHSAA and frequently worked playoff games, including state championships.

== Career ==
Madsen was hired as an umpire for the 1997 NFL season, remaining in the position through the 2008 season. He became a replay official for the 2009 season and was performing those duties at the time of his death in 2021.

Madsen made his first recorded postseason appearance on January 12, 2002, as umpire for the AFC wild-card game between the New York Jets and the Oakland Raiders. He officiated at the playoffs in seven seasons, and was a replay official for the 2018 and 2019 AFC Championship games. He also worked a Pro Bowl.

=== Final game and death ===
On October 24, 2021, Madsen worked a game between the Kansas City Chiefs and the Tennessee Titans at Nissan Stadium. The game began at 1:00 pm CDT and ended around 4:00 pm. At 4:46, police were called about an unconscious driver in a stalled SUV on Interstate 65. Officers from the Metro Nashville Police Department responded and extricated Madsen from his vehicle. They attempted to resuscitate him before EMS arrived. He was transported to Saint Thomas - Midtown Hospital, where he died.

== Personal life ==
Madsen lived with his wife in Weldon Spring, Missouri. They had three children, and a granddaughter. He received an MBA from the University of Northern Colorado.

Madsen died on October 24, 2021, in Nashville, Tennessee, at age 71.

== See also ==
- List of NFL officials
- List of sports officials who died while active
