= James Stewart (Australian Army officer) =

Australian soldier and public servant

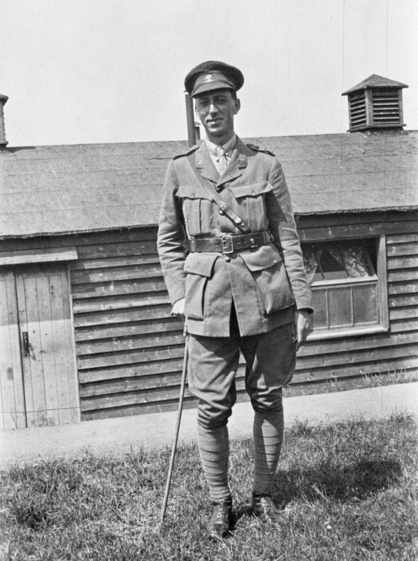
- Captain James Stewart in 1915
- Born: 19 January 1884; Belfast, Victoria
- Died: 2 June 1947 (aged 63); South Melbourne, Victoria
- Military career
- Allegiance: Australia
- Branch: Australian Army
- Service years: 1901–c.1934 1942–1945
- Rank: Brigadier General
- Commands: Melbourne Metropolitan Group, Volunteer Defence Corps (1942–45); 15th Brigade (1930–34); 10th Brigade (1921–26); 14th Brigade (1918–21); 57th Battalion (1916–18)
- Conflicts: First World War; Gallipoli campaign; Landing at Anzac Cove; Battle of Lone Pine; Western Front; Battle of Fromelles; Second Battle of Bullecourt; Battle of Polygon Wood; Second Battle of Villers-Bretonneux; Battle of Amiens; Battle of St Quentin Canal; Second World War
- Awards: Companion of the Order of St Michael and St George; Distinguished Service Order & Bar; Colonial Auxiliary Forces Officers' Decoration; Mentioned in Despatches (5)

Brigadier General James Campbell Stewart, CMG, DSO & Bar, VD (19 January 1884 (Note: On his application for a commission (13 August 1914), Stewart gave his date of birth as 19 January 1883) – 2 June 1947) was an Australian public servant and a senior officer in the Australian Army during the First World War.

Stewart commanded the Melbourne Metropolitan Group of the Volunteer Defence Corps during the Second World War. He died at his home in Melbourne on 2 June 1947, at the age of 63.
