= Lola Odelola =

British software engineer and campaigner

- Website: https://lolaslab.co/

Lola Odelola is a software engineer and campaigner recognised for her work to promote diversity in technology. She is the founder of Blackgirl.tech, a non-profit organisation that promotes diversity within the tech industry by creating a safe space for Black girls, non-binary people and women to learn and explore technology.

== Biography ==
In 2011 Odelola began her BA studies in English Literature and Creative Writing at Kingston University, graduating in 2013 with a 2.1. While searching for a job after her degree she wanted to build a website to showcase her writing, but she was on job seekers' allowance and could not afford to pay someone else to build it. She decided to teach herself. It was while building her own website that Odelola realised how much she enjoyed coding, prompting her to change her career and enrol on a coding boot camp.

=== Blackgirl.tech ===
After getting trained in tech but not managing to secure a job in London, Odelola realised that the word "diversity" was used frequently by tech companies. However, black women were missing from the conversation. In reaction, Odelola set up blackgirl.tech in 2014 as a space for black girls and women to explore and learn about technology. She said to BuzzFeed in 2016, “I grew up in a predominately black area, the kids in my community were black, the kids in my school were black.” She continues, "So I’ve been in a place where people were not challenged or exposed to certain things and career options, and I want to do my part to change that. I want to introduce black girls to the world of tech.”

By 2016, Odelola had a dedicated team for the first time and ran at least one workshop a month on different coding languages. blackgirl.tech subsequently gained funding from 38 Degrees and were able to hire a screen at RichMix to host a private viewing of Hidden Figures. The next year, they hosted a screening of Black Panther, 38 Degrees supplied more funding allowing blackgirl.tech to launch their scholarship program. Finally closing in 2019, over five years blackgirl.tech mentored and hosted events attended by over 300 black women, girls & non-binary people.

=== Recent work ===
In 2018, Odelola was invited to speak about underrepresentation in the tech industry on BBC Inside Science. Odelola produces and hosts the 'Lost in the Source' podcast, where she talks about her journey through tech and explains technical concepts. She is a Core Support Engineer at Heroku.

== Recognition ==
In 2016, Odelola was named as one of Code First: Girls's top UK women in tech under 30. In 2018, she was recognised as an inspirational woman in tech and listed as a Department for Work and Pensions female role model. In 2019, Computerworld recognised her as one of the most inspiring Black women in UK technology for her work on Blackgirl.tech and contributions to Project Ada. Tech Nation listed her as one of the "50 most inspiring, prominent, and influential black voices in UK tech".
