= Walnut Park East, St. Louis =

Neighborhood of St. Louis in Missouri, US

Coordinates: 38.6974°N 90.2514°W

Walnut Park East
- Neighborhood of St. Louis
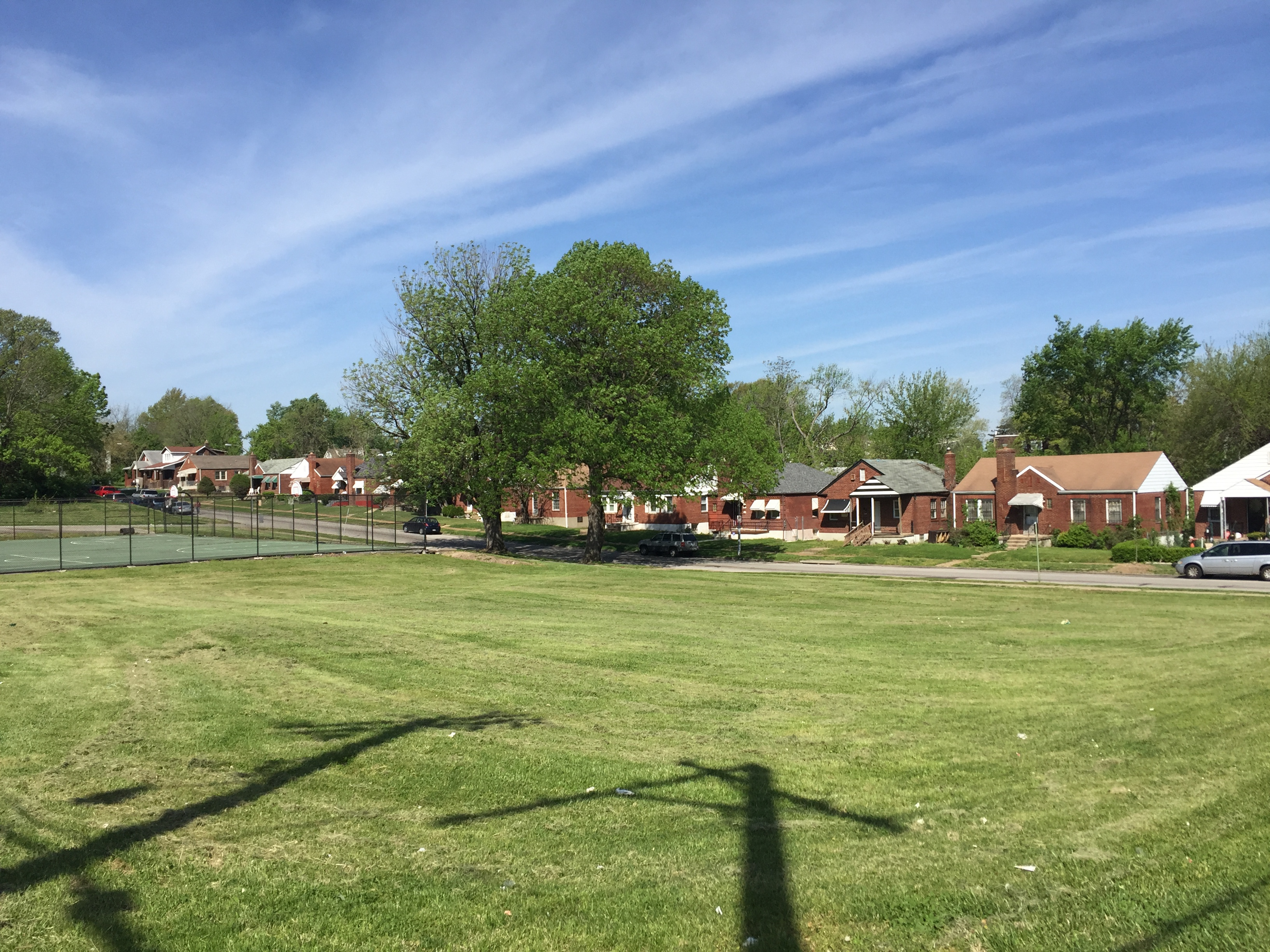
- View of Walnut Park East from Walnut Park, May 2018

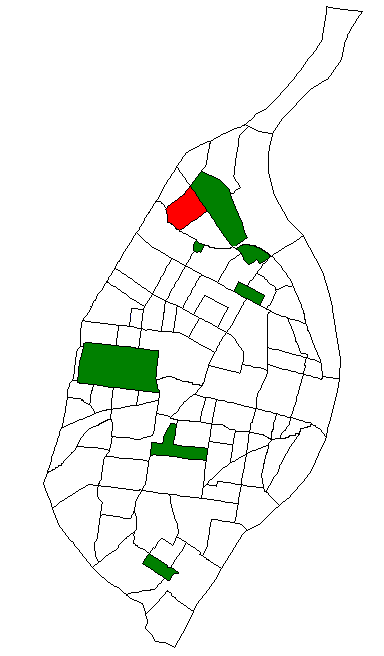
- Location (red) of Walnut Park East within St. Louis
- Country: United States
- State: Missouri
- City: St. Louis
- Wards: 13

Government
  - Aldermen: Pam Boyd

Area
  - Total: 0.67 sq mi (1.7 km^{2})

Population (2020)
  - Total: 2,757
  - Density: 4,100/sq mi (1,600/km^{2})
- ZIP code(s): Part of 63120
- Area code(s): 314
- Website: stlouis-mo.gov

Walnut Park East is a neighborhood of St. Louis, Missouri. Walnut Park East is one of several neighborhoods in northwest St. Louis. Its borders are West Florissant Avenue (Calvary Cemetery) to the northeast, Emerson Avenue to the southeast, Interstate 70 (I-70) to the southwest and west, and Riverview Boulevard to the northwest.

== Education ==
- Northwest High School
- Northwest Junior High School
- Walnut Park Elementary School
- Aspire Academy

== Demographics ==
Historical population
Census	Pop.	Note	%±
1990	7,353		—
2000	5,345		−27.3%
2010	4,130		−22.7%
2020	2,757		−33.2%

In 2020 Walnut Park East's racial makeup was 93.9% Black, 3.4% Two or More Races, 1.4% White, 0.1% Native American, and 0.6% Some Other Race. 1.6% of the people were of Hispanic or Latino origin.
