= James T. Stewart =

United States Air Force general (1921–1990)

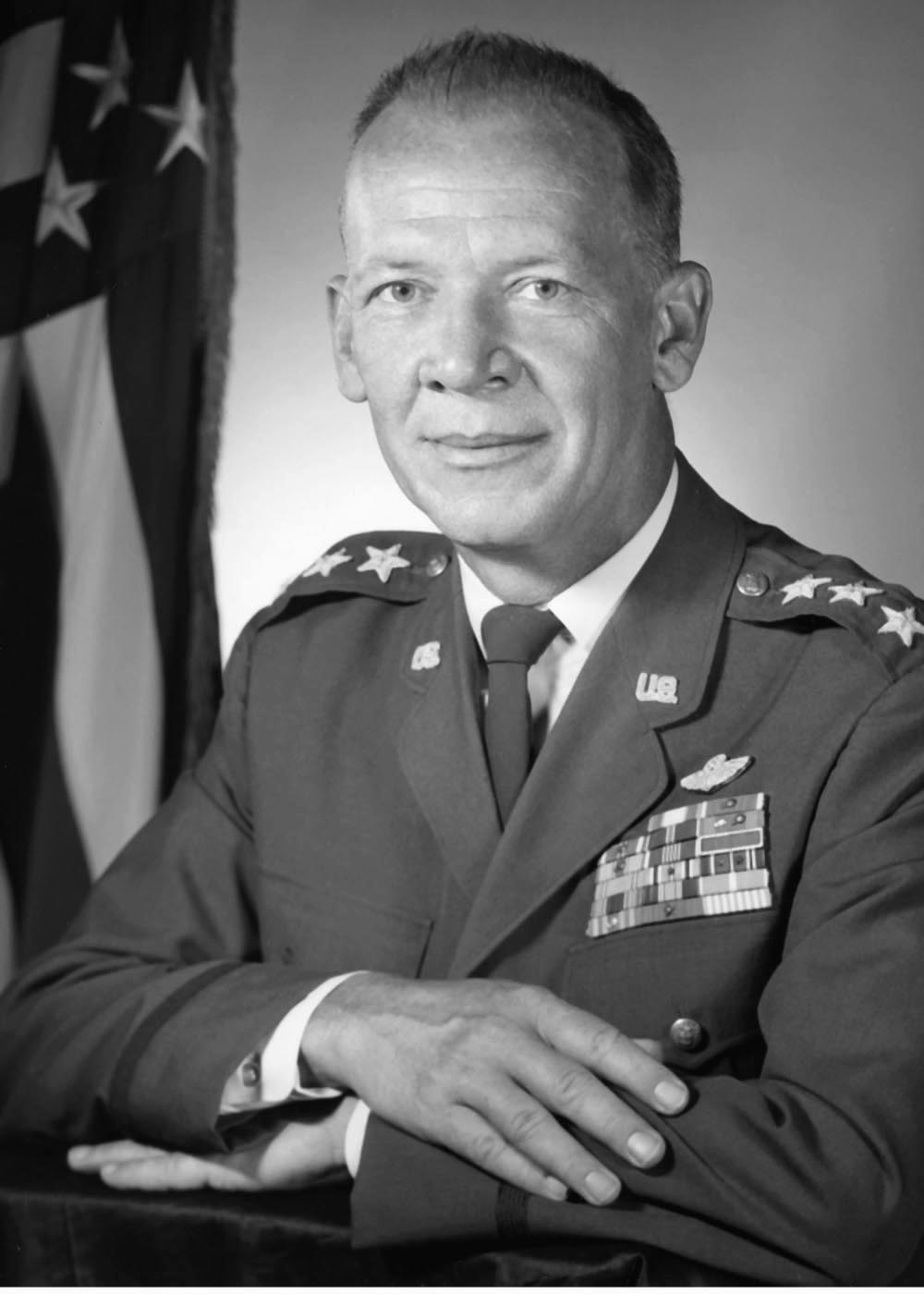
- Born: 2 April 1921; St. Louis, Missouri
- Died: 3 September 1990 (aged 69)
- Burial place: Arlington National Cemetery, Arlington, Virginia
- Military career
- Allegiance: United States
- Branch: United States Army (1941–1947); United States Air Force (1947–1976)
- Service years: 1941–1976
- Rank: Lieutenant General
- Conflicts: World War II; Korean War
- Awards: Distinguished Service Medal; Legion of Merit (2); Distinguished Flying Cross; Bronze Star Medal; Air Medal (7); Army Commendation Medal (2); Air Force Commendation Medal; Croix de Guerre 1939–1945 (France); United Nations Service Medal

James Thompson Stewart (2 April 1921 – 3 September 1990) was a lieutenant general in the United States Air Force (USAF). He entered the United States Army Air Corps in 1941, and flew two combat tours in Europe as commander of the 508th Bombardment Squadron during World War II. He served with the Far East Air Force in the Korean War, and was staff director of the National Reconnaissance Office and the vice director of the Manned Orbiting Laboratory.

== Early life ==
James Thompson Stewart was born St. Louis, Missouri, on 2 April 1921, the son of Freddie Duell and Bertha Golike Stewart. He graduated from Roosevelt High School in St. Louis in 1938. His father wanted him to attended the United States Naval Academy, but he was unable to secure an appointment, and entered the University of Michigan instead.

While there he served in the Reserve Officer Training Corps (ROTC), and learned to fly though the Civilian Pilot Training Program, with the idea of eventually becoming a commercial pilot. After two years at the University of Michigan he was offered an appointment to the Naval Academy but turned it down, since World War II had already broken out in Europe and he did not want to spend the next few years at the Academy.

== World War II ==
In 1941, Stewart attempted to join the Navy, but for some reason it determined that he was color blind. The Army's tests indicated no such disability, and with over two years of college he was allowed to enlist as a Flying Cadet. He underwent primary, basic and advanced pilot training at Brooks Field, Texas, and on completion of the training he received his wings and was commissioned as a second lieutenant in the United States Army Air Corps in 1942.

Stewart was assigned to 116th Observation Squadron at Fort Lewis, Washington, a Washington National Guard observation unit flying the North American O-47, and he and flew patrol missions off the coast of Oregon and Washington state. The squadron was disbanded on 30 November 1942, and Stewart underwent transition training on the Boeing B-17 Flying Fortress at Geiger Field, Washington, and became an instructor pilot.

Soon afterwards, he was transferred to the 508th Bombardment Squadron, which was part of the Eighth Air Force's 351st Bombardment Group. The 508th Bombardment Squadron deployed to RAF Polebrook in the United Kingdom in May 1943, and Stewart became its commander the following month. He commanded the squadron for the rest of the war, and flew two combat tours, something few men survived long enough to achieve. He married Georgia Schwepker of Tacoma, Washington, on 28 June 1944. They had two children, a boy and a girl.

== Post-war ==
After the war ended, Stewart was offered a regular commission and accepted it. He attended the Aircraft Maintenance Officer course at Chanute Field in Illinois, and in 1947 he returned to the University of Michigan, from which he received a Bachelor of Science degree in aeronautical engineering in 1948. He was then assigned to the Air Proving Ground at Eglin Air Force Base, where he pioneered techniques for long-range flying using cruise control, and the delivery of nuclear weapons from jet fighter aircraft.

In 1952, during the Korean War, Stewart was posted to Far East Air Force headquarters in Tokyo, Japan, where he established requirements for equipment, supervised local modifications, and developed the nuclear delivery capability of the Republic F-84 Thunderjet fighters. In 1954 he became the Far Eastern Air Force assistant deputy chief of staff for operations. He later wrote a book, Airpower – The Decisive Force in Korea (1958).

Stewart returned to the United States in 1955, and was assigned to U.S. Air Force (USAF) headquarters in Washington D.C., where he was involved with development planning, eventually becoming the assistant chief of staff for development planning. He attended the Industrial College of the Armed Forces from August 1959 to June 1960, and then was assigned to the Air Research and Development Command (ARDC) at Andrews Air Force Base in Maryland as assistant deputy chief of staff for programming, and then as assistant deputy chief of staff for systems when the ARDC became the Air Force Systems Command. He received a master of business administration degree from George Washington University in 1963.

In August 1964 General Stewart was assigned to the Office of the Secretary of the Air Force as the director, Office of Space Systems. As such he was also the staff director of the National Reconnaissance Office. After briefly serving at the USAF headquarters as director of space in early 1967, he became the vice director of the Manned Orbiting Laboratory program in March. After the project was cancelled he became deputy chief of staff for systems at the Air Force Systems Command, and then in June 1970, assumed command of the Aeronautical Systems Division at Wright-Patterson Air Force Base in Ohio. He retired as a on 1 September 1976 with the rank of lieutenant general. Stewart's decorations included the Distinguished Service Medal, the Legion of Merit with oak leaf cluster, the Distinguished Flying Cross, the Bronze Star Medal, the Air Medal with six oak leaf clusters, the Army Commendation Medal, Air Force Commendation Medal with oak lef cluster, French Croix de Guerre 1939–1945 and the United Nations Service Medal.

== Later life ==
Stewart died on 3 September 1990, and was buried in Arlington National Cemetery.

== Dates of rank ==
| Insignia | Rank | Component | Date | Reference |
|---|---|---|---|---|
| | Second lieutenant | Air Corps | 29 April 1942 | |
| | First lieutenant (temporary) | Army of the United States | 26 February 19432 | |
| | Captain (temporary) | Army of the United States | 7 July 1943 | |
| | Major (temporary) | Army of the United States | 29 October 1943 | |
| | Lieutenant colonel (temporary) | Army of the United States | 11 November 1944 | |
| | First lieutenant | Air Corps | 29 April 1945 | |
| | Captain | United States Air Force | 25 October 1948 | |
| | Colonel (temporary) | United States Air Force | 1 August 1951 | |
| | Major | United States Air Force | 12 October 1951 | |
| | Lieutenant colonel | United States Air Force | 8 August 1958 | |
| | Colonel | United States Air Force | 22 December 1960 | |
| | Brigadier general (temporary) | United States Air Force | 1 January 1964 | |
| | Brigadier general | United States Air Force | 10 February 1966 | |
| | Major general (temporary) | United States Air Force | 1 October 1966 | |
| | Major general | United States Air Force | 16 February 1968 | |
| | Lieutenant general (temporary) | United States Air Force | 1 June 1970 | |
