= Viggo Madsen =

Danish poet and writer (1943–2025)

Carl Viggo Madsen (6 January 1943 – 8 July 2025) was a Danish poet and writer.

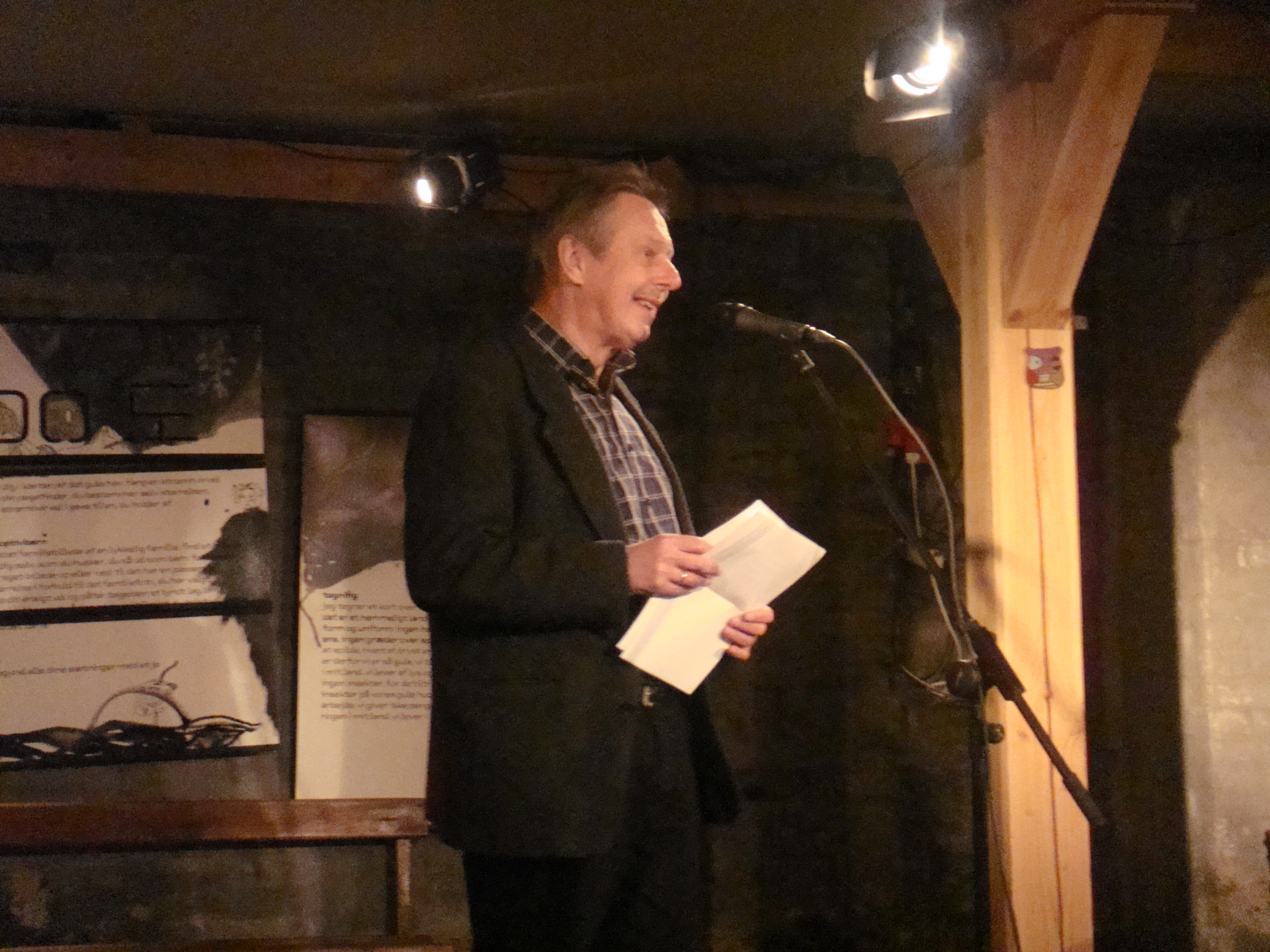
Madsen in 2010

== Life and career ==
Madsen made his debut with an autobiographical novel, Fireman on Two Wheels in 1966. During the period between 1966-2008 he has published 16 official poetry collections, partly with underground publishers and partly with more "established" writers such as Forlaget Sommersko, but since 1989 he had also been on a permanent contract with Hovedland. In addition, since his debut, he published a total of four adult novels and nine children's books, eight of which are in the series The Detective Club. Together with his son, Rune Høirup Madsen, he has continuously created a fictional universe, centered on the hippopotamus Boffel and his odd family and experiences, which in 1999 resulted in the first CD with music about Boffel's experiences.

Madsen died on 8 July 2025, at the age of 82.
