= Nottingham Community Access and Job Training School =

Alternate high school in St. Louis, USA

Location
- 4915 Donovan Avenue; St. Louis, Missouri 63109; United States; 38.587679°N 90.304439°W

Information
- Type: High school
- Established: 1996; 30 years ago
- School district: St. Louis Public Schools
- Superintendent: Kelvin Adams
- Principal: Kimberly Long
- Grades: 9–12
- Enrollment: 133
- Colors: Green and gold
- Sports: Baseball, Basketball, Volleyball
- Website: cajt.slps.org

Nottingham Community Access and Job Training School, abbreviated Nottingham CAJT, is an alternate public high school located in the St. Louis Hills neighborhood of St. Louis, Missouri. Nottingham is a public alternative high school designed to help students with moderate to severe disabilities find employment through work placement programs.

== Clubs ==
- Basketball
- Volleyball
- Track
- Challenger Baseball
- Student Council
- Fine Arts Club
- Choir
- Games Club
- Exercise & Fitness Club
