= Robin Berjon =

French computer scientist and political writer

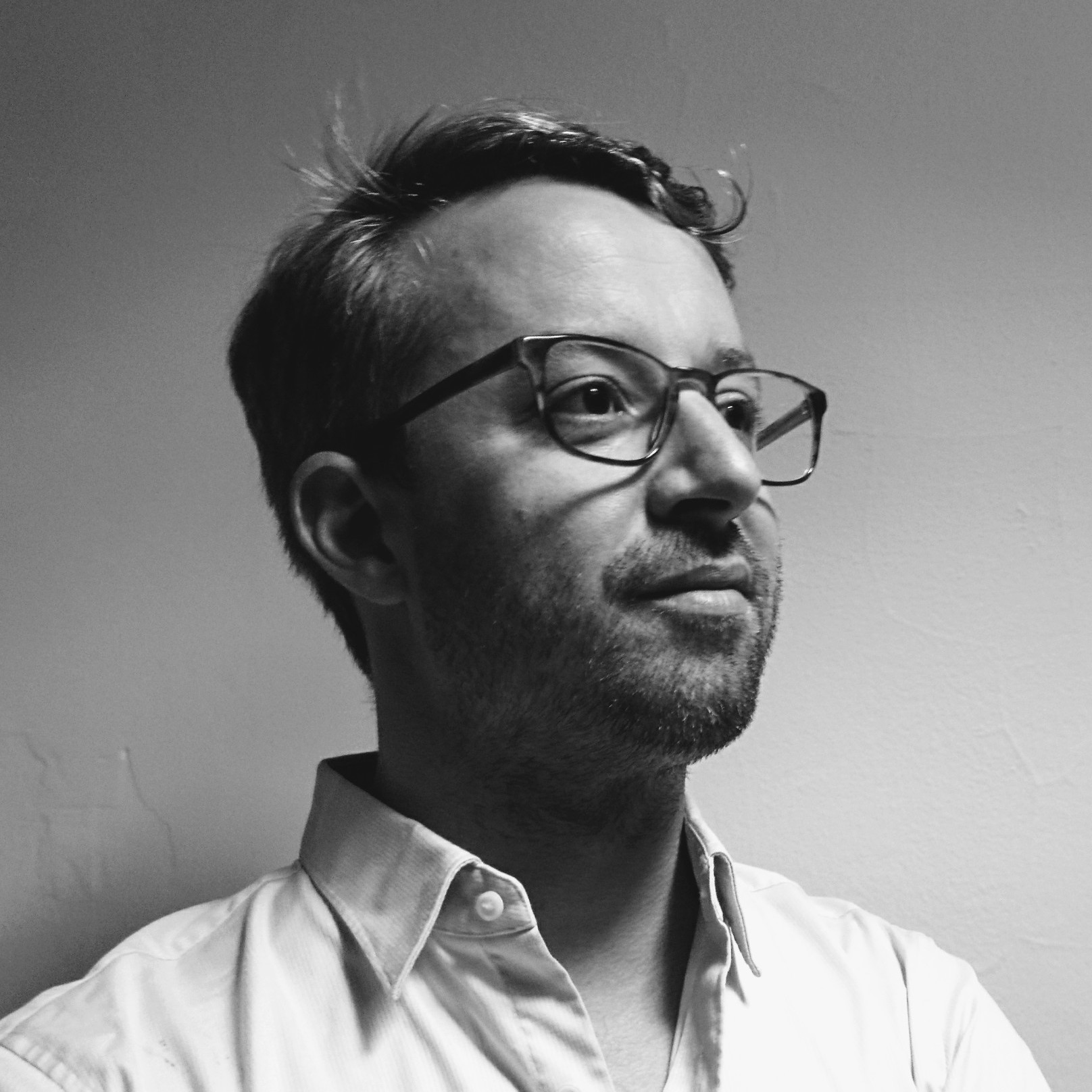
- Robin Berjon in July 2017
- Born: Robin Berjon; March 15, 1977 (age 48)
- Scientific career
- Fields: Web; HTML5; JavaScript; SVG; XML

Robin Berjon is a French computer scientist and political writer. He is the editor of the W3C HTML5 specification. In 2012 he was elected to the W3C Technical Architecture Group (TAG) but he resigned early in 2013.
