= List of killings by law enforcement officers in the United States, October 2022 =

This is a list of people reported killed by non-military law enforcement officers in the United States in October 2022, whether in the line of duty or not, and regardless of reason or method. The listing documents the occurrence of a death, making no implications regarding wrongdoing or justification on the part of the person killed or officer involved. Killings are arranged by date of the incident that caused death. Different death dates, if known, are noted in the description. The table below lists 98 people.

== October 2022 ==
Date	Name (age) of deceased	Race of deceased	Location	Description
2022-10-31	Donathy Wayne Doddy (61)	Black	Dallas, TX	
2022-10-31	Denzil Ollen Broadhurst (61)	White	Sacramento, California	Broadhurst died after his motorcycle was struck by a police vehicle. The officer was responding to a felony in progress and did not have lights or sirens on. The officer was later charged with vehicular manslaughter.
2022-10-31	Eugene Reed (69)	White	Sherwood, Arkansas	
2022-10-31	James Templeton (55)	Unknown	Saddle Ridge, Wyoming	
2022-10-31	Zachary Cervice (50)	White	Fawn Township, Pennsylvania	
2022-10-31	Unnamed man (65)	Unknown race	Taylor, MI	
2022-10-30	William Salgado (30)	Latino	Huntington Park, California	
2022-10-30	Salvador Maceda (36)	Latino	Santa Maria, California	Police encountered Maceda while conducting an investigation as he displayed two knives near some trash cans. After being hit by two beanbag rounds, Maceda threw a knife at an officer and fled to an apartment, where he climbed to the second-story balcony as a resident armed with a gun called 911. After 90 minutes, Maceda put the second knife on the floor of the balcony, after which police fired pepper balls at him. Maceda then allegedly threw several objects at officers, including a bicycle and a chair, then allegedly broke a front window with a small folding table. Police then shot Maceda once.
2022-10-30	Name Withheld	Hispanic	San Luis, AZ	
2022-10-30	Randall Bass (47)	White	Hammond, LA	
2022-10-30	Jeramyah Wilson (23)	Black	Omaha, NE	
2022-10-30	Kenneth Jamel Carrol (24)	Black	Davenport, IA	
2022-10-28	Willie Williams (35)	Black	Atlanta, GA	
2022-10-28	Richard Quave Jr. (49)	White	Vancleave, MS	
2022-10-28	Name Withheld (16)	Unknown race	Seguin, TX	
2022-10-28	Name Withheld	White	Boaz, AL	
2022-10-27	Ivan Hinojosa (23)	Hispanic	Alice, TX	
2022-10-27	Breen Reiss (41)	White	Mesa, AZ	
2022-10-27	Carlos Trotter (36)	Black	Lawrence, IN	
2022-10-26	Joshua Bailes (40)	White	Kansas CIty, MO	
2022-10-25	Javier Manuel Soto (25)	Hispanic	Gillsville, GA	
2022-10-25	James Wilborn (35)	Black	Atlanta, GA	
2022-10-25	David Strain (31)	White	Lone Tree, CO	
2022-10-25	Clarissa Daws (29)	White	Lone Tree, CO	
2022-10-25	Alfredo Gonzalez-Garza (26)	Hispanic	Houston, TX	
2022-10-24	Orlando Harris (19)	Black	St. Louis, Missouri	Harris shot six people, killing a teacher and student, at the Central Visual and Performing Arts High School, before dying in a shootout with police.
2022-10-24	Ezekiel Lamar Love (22)	Black	Adelanto, CA	
2022-10-24	Xavier Benson (20)	Unknown race	Castro Valley, CA	
2022-10-24	Name Withheld (58)	Unknown race	Detroit, MI	
2022-10-23	Lynn Fredericksen (57)	White	Louisville, CO	
2022-10-23	Justin Harrod (40)	White	Kingsland, TX	
2022-10-23	Jose C. Jimenez (21)	Hispanic	Oregon, WI	
2022-10-23	Ronnie Lee Martin (42)	White	Senatobia, MS	
2022-10-22	Desman LaDuke (22)	Black	Nicholasville, Kentucky	Police responded to reports that LaDuke was suicidal and possessing firearms. Police stated that after two hours, police were confronted by an armed individual, but later clarified that LaDuke allegedly pointed two handguns at the rear window of his residence, where officers were outside.
2022-10-21	Christopher David Roldan (33)	White	Johnstown, CO	
2022-10-21	Luis Alfredo Ferro-Sanchez (20)	Latino	Salinas, California	An off-duty Santa Cruz Police officer was cleaning his personal weapon when it discharged, striking him in the hand and Ferro-Sanchez in the upper torso.
2022-10-21	Aaron Linke (48)	White	Morrison, IL	
2022-10-19	Jason Smith (44)	Unknown race	Oxford, MS	
2022-10-19	Thomas Christopher Wheeler (26)	White	Easley, SC	
2022-10-19	Jorge Arias (35)	Latino	Miami-Dade County, Florida	Arias, a United States Customs and Border Protection officer, was accidentally shot during a training scenario. According to the Miami Herald another agent mistakenly replaced his training pistol with his handgun and accidentally shot Arias.
2022-10-19	Mark Edward Evers (64)	Unknown race	Rockdale, TX	
2022-10-18	Vincent Martinez (55)	Hispanic	Oak Park, CA	
2022-10-18	Derrick Weatherspoon (33)	Black	San Diego, CA	
2022-10-18	Jason Thorpe (36)	White	Sparks, NV	
2022-10-18	Unnamed person	Unknown race	Paragould, AR	
2022-10-18	Wilma Taft (69)	White	Midwest City, OK	
2022-10-17	Name Withheld (28)	Unknown race	North Richland Hills, TX	
2022-10-17	Gabriel Thone (24)	White	Louisiana, MO	
2022-10-16	Christopher Blount (45)	Black	Augusta, GA	
2022-10-16	Angel Jimenez (26)	Hispanic	Anadarko, OK	
2022-10-16	Sergio Gruver (21)	Black	Oklahoma City, OK	
2022-10-16	Joel Capellan (29)	Black	New York, NY	
2022-10-15	Taylor Grimes (29)	Black	Fort Worth, TX	
2022-10-15	Nelson Amos (71)	White	Decatur, AR	
2022-10-13	Quantaze Campbell (46)	Black	Windsor, WI	
2022-10-13	Christopher Ardoin (31)	Black	Lake Charles, LA	
2022-10-13	Taylor L. Lowery (33)	Black	Topeka, KS	
2022-10-12	Jeffery J. Smith (52)	Unknown	Loon Lake, Washington	Officers responded to an incident where Smith held a man at gunpoint. He fired a shot next to his head. Officers heard these gunshots and told Smith he was under arrest. Smith was asked to surrender and refused and instead threatened to shoot deputies. SWAT team members confronted Smith and two members shot and killed him.
2022-10-12	Nicholas Brutcher (35)	White	Bristol, Connecticut	Brutcher called police to report a domestic dispute with his brother, but authorities believe the call was made to lure officers to his home. When officers arrived, Brutcher shot at them, killing two and wounding another before the third officer shot and killed him. Brutcher's brother was also shot during the incident.
2022-10-12	Jamontey O. Neal (32)	Black	Decatur, IL	
2022-10-12	Raheem Lee (19)	Black	Philadelphia, PA	
2022-10-11	Jason Sanderson (41)	White	Los Angeles, CA	
2022-10-10	Hui Zhang (33)	Asian	Paterson, New Jersey	Zhang, of Pensacola, Florida, was involved in a vehicle crash. After allegedly trying to enter several vehicles with an imitation firearm, a detective shot Zhang.
2022-10-10	Daniel Francis Scott (30)	White	Clarksville, IN	
2022-10-10	Christopher Earl Smith (44)	Black	North Las Vegas, NV	
2022-10-10	Unnamed person	Native American	Checotah, OK	
2022-10-10	Terry Hinton (60)	White	Tuscumbia, Alabama	A marked police cruiser struck a pedestrian, Hinton, who was pronounced dead at the scene. The driver, a Tuscumbia police officer, was indicted for murder in March 2023. The indictment stated that the officer was under the influence of alcohol during the crash.
2022-10-09	Johnny Devin James (62)	Unknown race	Lumberton, TX	
2022-10-09	Bryar Everett Wolfe (19)	White	Angola, IN	
2022-10-09	David Arnold (54)	Unknown race	Jenny Lind, CA	
2022-10-08	Stephaun Jones (25)	Black	Hamilton, Ohio	Police searched for Jones, who was suspected of killing another man in Hamilton after a car accident. He encountered two Fairfield Township Police officers and pointed a gun at them, but the officers did not fire at Jones, writing in a report that shooting at him would risk accidentally hitting a nearby man mowing his lawn. Jones fled and later encountered two Hamilton officers, who shot him when he allegedly pulled the gun out. The two Fairfield Township officers later resigned for not shooting Jones.
2022-10-07	Thomas Henzler	Unknown race	Black Canyon City, AZ	
2022-10-07	Christopher Allen Boggess (49)	White	Lorain, OH	
2022-10-07	Dexton Bolden (33)	Black	College Park, GA	
2022-10-07	Unknown	Unknown	El Segundo, California	A man died after he was struck by a patrol car while crossing a street. The California Highway Patrol is investigating.
2022-10-06	Jaheim McMillan (15)	Black	Gulfport, Mississippi	Police responded to reports that several people in a car were brandishing weapons and chasing another vehicle. Two of the vehicle's five occupants fled, and one, McMillan, was shot by police. Police stated McMillan had turned around with a weapon and refused to drop it after repeated commands, although some witness accounts claimed he was unarmed with his hands raised. In February 2023 a grand jury cleared the officer involved, and bodycamera footage was released, showing the officer shot McMillan as he ran holding what appeared to be a gun.
2022-10-06	Jonas Drew Gonzales (33)	Hispanic	San Antonio, TX	
2022-10-05	Ronald Dunigan Burdine (56)	Unknown race	Port Neches, TX	
2022-10-05	Ron Welch (33)	White	Baytown, TX	
2022-10-05	Bobby Johnston (40)	Native Hawaiian and Pacific Islander	Claremore, OK	
2022-10-05	Jeremy McCracken (38)	White	Springfield Township, Summit County, OH	
2022-10-05	Troy Garcia (51)	Unknown race	Colorado City, CO	
2022-10-05	Terrance Robinson (31)	Black	Lansing, Michigan	Robinson was shot and killed by Lansing Police Department officers. LPD reported that they arrived to investigate potential vehicle thefts at the property when Robinson fired at them, though Robinson's mother – a former LPD employee – questioned the event and said his killing was preventable.
2022-10-05	Gershun Freeman (33)	Black	Memphis, Tennessee	Correctional officers fought with Freeman, an inmate at 201 Poplar. Freeman was restrained by officers and went into cardiac arrest. His death was ruled a homicide, with the cause of death being cardiovascular disease exacerbated by the restraint.
2022-10-04	Manuel Gonzalez-Moran (33)	Hispanic	El Paso, TX	
2022-10-04	Colin West (36)	White	Warrington, FL	
2022-10-04	Blane Lane (21)	White	Polk City, Florida	Lane and several other Polk County Sheriff's deputies served a warrant against a woman for failure to appear on meth charges. According to police the woman had a BB gun mistaken for a real handgun, which led deputies to shoot. One deputy fired a round that struck Lane, who died at Lakeland Regional Hospital.
2022-10-03	Samuel Richmond (59)	Black	Peoria, Illinois	Police responded to reports of a suicidal man and encountered Richmond holding a gun. Four officers shot Richmond after he pointed the gun at them.
2022-10-03	Gary DeSanctis (51)	White	Bernalillo, NM	
2022-10-02	Thomas Talley (40)	Unknown race	Indianapolis, IN	
2022-10-02	Antonio Calmese (20)	Black	Chicago, IL	
2022-10-02	Michael Scott Blanck (43)	White	Lawrence, KS	
2022-10-02	Alexander Collins (35)	White	Aurora, CO	
2022-10-02	Talley, Thomas (40)	Unknown	Indianapolis	
2022-10-01	Farthing, Bobby (62)	Unknown	Mountain View, North Carolina	
2022-10-01	Yohannes, Abel (30)	Hispanic	Aurora, Colorado	
2022-10-01	Carrell, Carl (64)	White	Excelsior Springs, Missouri	
2022-10-01	Porter Burks (22)	Black	Detroit, Michigan	Police responded to reports of a man with a knife having a mental health crisis at an apartment. After a crisis intervention officer spoke to Burks, video shows him charge at officers with the knife. Five officers then shot 38 rounds at Burks, hitting him up to fifteen times.

== See also ==
- Death in custody § United States
- Henry A. Wallace Police Crime Public Database
- List of cases of police brutality
- List of countries with annual rates and counts for killings by law enforcement officers
- List of law enforcement officers killed in the line of duty in the United States
- List of law enforcement officers convicted for an on-duty killing in the United States
- List of shootings by US immigration agents
- List of police reforms related to the George Floyd protests
- List of unarmed African Americans killed by law enforcement officers in the United States
- Lists of killings by law enforcement officers
- Police brutality in the United States
- Police misconduct § United States
- Police riot § United States
- Police use of deadly force in the United States
