= Central Visual and Performing Arts High School =

Magnet high school in St. Louis, Missouri, United States

Location
- 3125 S Kingshighway Blvd; St. Louis, Missouri; United States; 38.6046°N 90.2709°W

Information
- Type: Magnet high school
- Motto: Where Arts and Academics Share Center Stage
- Established: February 7, 1853; 173 years ago
- School district: St. Louis Public Schools
- Superintendent: Myra Berry
- Principal: Amy Phillips
- Faculty: 29.00 (FTE)
- Grades: 9–12
- Enrollment: 386 (2022–23)
- Student to teacher ratio: 13.31
- Campus type: Urban
- Colors: Gold, white, and black (formerly red and black)
- Nickname: Eagles (formerly Owls)
- Newspaper: None (formerly the Monthly Blossom, The Nut, The Reflector, and The High School News)
- Yearbook: Famebook (formerly The Red and Black)
- Website: cvpa.slps.org

Central Visual and Performing Arts High School (CVPA) is a magnet high school in St. Louis, Missouri, part of the St. Louis Public Schools.

Founded in 1853, Central High School is the oldest public high school west of the Mississippi River, although it has moved several times and merged with a magnet school in 1984. Central VPA specializes in the arts, with students taking courses in five art majors, including dance, theatre, visual art, instrumental music, and vocal music.

== History ==
=== Establishment and early moves: 1853–1893 ===
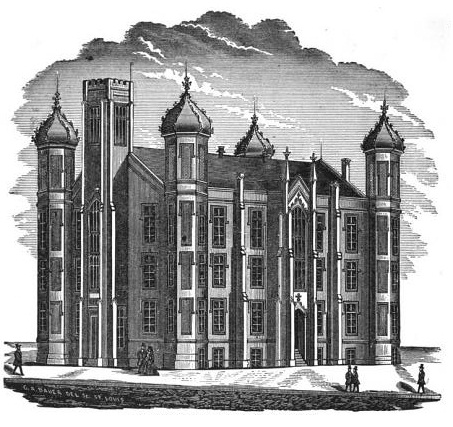
The first purpose-built Central High School building opened in 1855.

In late 1852, the Board of Education of the St. Louis Public Schools ordered the organization and opening of a high school to serve the city population. The Board located the school within Benton School, a primary school then located on 6th Street between St. Charles and Locust streets, and on February 7, 1853, 70 students were admitted after an entrance examination. Its first principal was Jeremiah D. Low. Soon after its opening, the Board ordered construction on a dedicated building for the high school, then known simply as St. Louis High School.

Designed by William Rumbold, the new building was built in 1855 at a cost of $50,000 at the corner of Olive and 15th streets. The building had three full stories and a basement, nine classrooms, a 700-seat auditorium, and 16 smaller rooms used as libraries and wardrobes. It initially was built with a capacity of slightly less than 500 students. By 1859, course requirements for entrance had been developed, and two courses of study (general or classical) were available to students.

The high school remained the only public high school in the community until the establishment of Sumner High School for black students in 1874. By the early 1890s, the Central High School building at 15th and Olive had deteriorated and become too small for the number of students attempting to enroll.

=== New building and the tornado: 1893–1927 ===
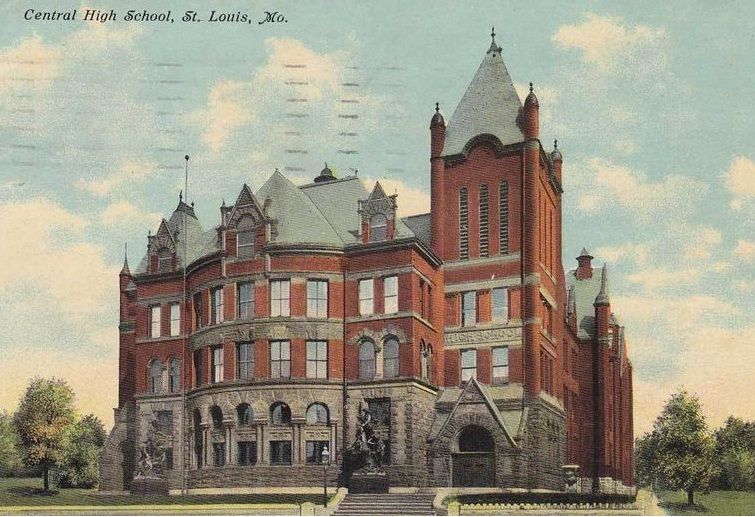
The second Central High School

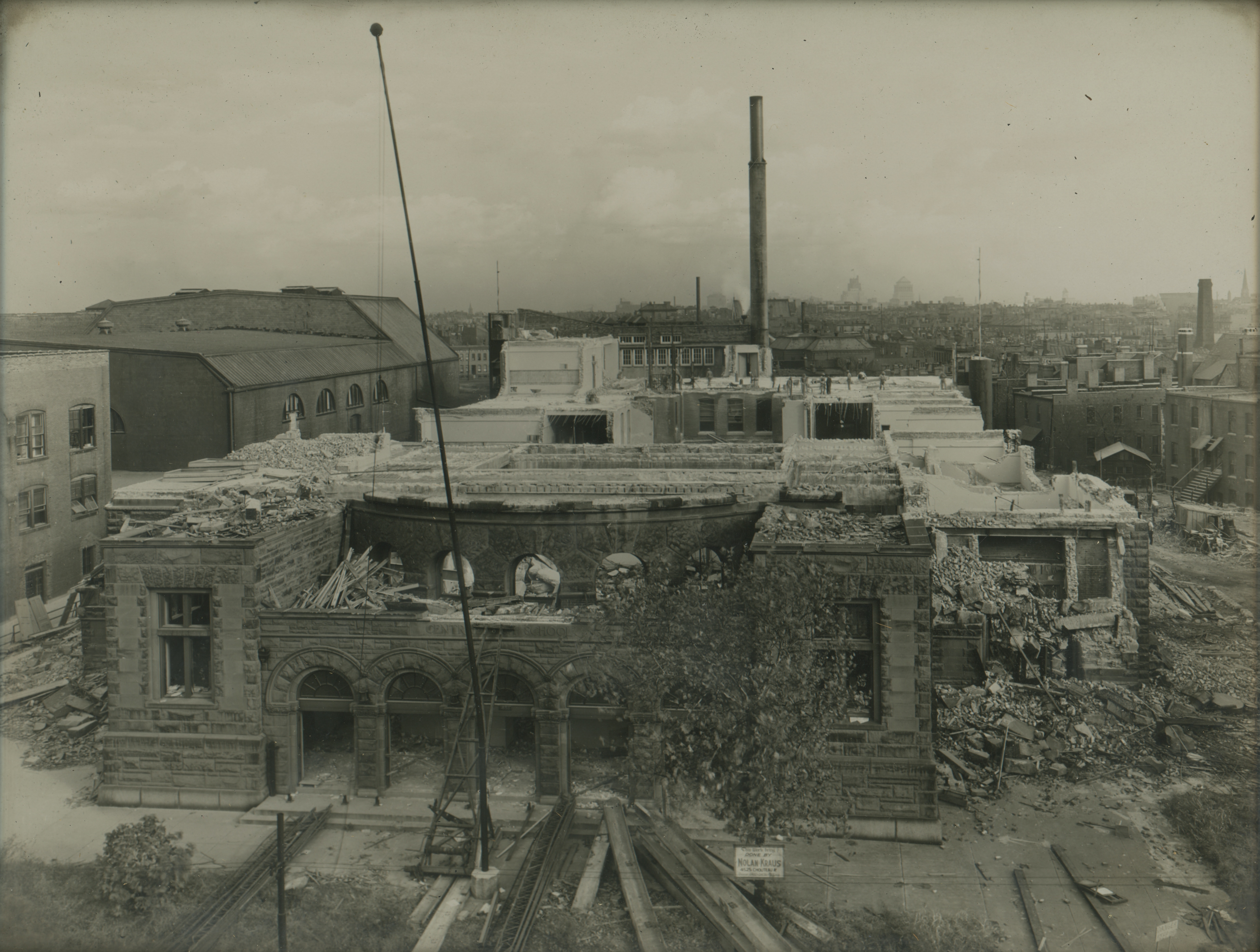
Demolition, after 1927 tornado damage.

The new Central High School building opened on September 1, 1893; designed by Furlong and Brown in the Victorian style, the facility cost $365,000, while land acquisition costs were $34,000. The building featured four stories, a curved facade, and a tower housing the school stairwells, and it had a capacity of 1,200 students. A notable event in Central's history occurred when, in 1922, William J. S. Bryan retired after having taught for 50 years in the school. During this period, several other high schools opened in St. Louis to alleviate overcrowding at Central, including McKinley High School and Yeatman High School in 1904, followed by Soldan High School in 1909, Cleveland High School in 1915, Roosevelt High School in 1925 and Beaumont High School in 1926.

On September 29, 1927, a tornado struck St. Louis, including Central High School, killing 76 people and leaving 1,500 others injured in total. The tornado killed five students—they are listed in the 1928 Central yearbook on a page with a touching poem--- and more than a dozen were injured when the school's tower collapsed. The damage to the building was so great that the school was permanently relocated to nearby Yeatman High School, which was renamed Central High School. The building, located on Garrison Avenue, had been designed by William B. Ittner as a three-story all-brick building with two towers at its entrance, and it would continue to house Central students through 2004. It has long been forgotten that the Central student body and faculty had just returned to the Grand Avenue building FROM Yeatman High School, where the school had been housed two years while the Grand Avenue building underwent an extensive renovation and updating. School had just gotten underway back at the Central building when the tornado struck. Everyone and everything had to be moved back to Yeatman. It's also been long forgotten that one wall of the school eventually built on the Central site, the factory-like and uniquely conceived Hadley Vocational High School, was a wall preserved from the Central building.

=== Integration, magnet school status, and merger: 1927–1984 ===
- Central High School
- U.S. National Register of Historic Places
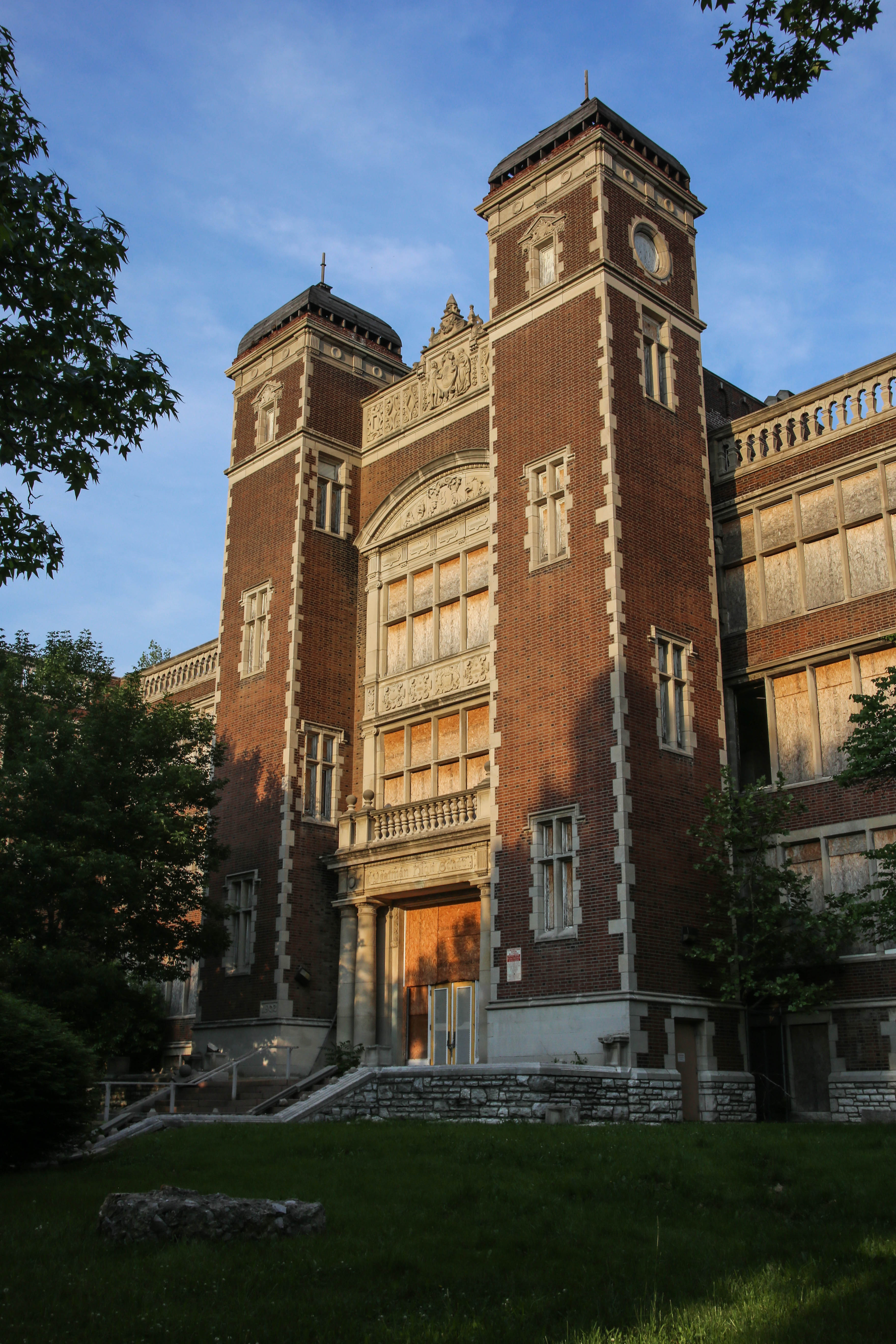

- Location within Missouri
- Location: 3616 Garrison, St. Louis, Missouri
- Coordinates: 38.65962°N 90.21470°W
- Architect: William B. Ittner
- MPS: St. Louis Public Schools of William B. Ittner MPS
- NRHP reference No.: 12000873
- Added to NRHP: October 17, 2012

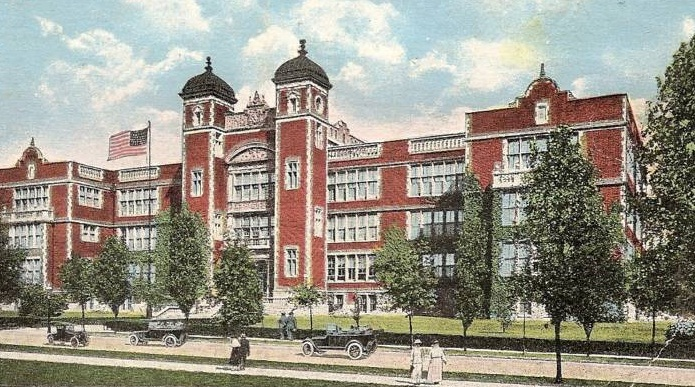
Central High School occupied the Yeatman High School building from 1927 to 2004.

Central students continued their traditions at their new building on Garrison Avenue, including the use of the letter "H" to signify the school's status as the first high school west of the Mississippi. During the 1930s, enrollment in the St. Louis Public Schools increased and achieved a peak of 106,300 students; several high schools in the district reported overcrowding, and Central was no exception. In the 1931–1932 school year, enrollment at Central stood at slightly more than 1,500 students. Two years later, during the 1934–1935 school year, the enrollment at Central had grown to nearly 1,700 students. It was during the early 1950s at Central that the school's baseball team won three consecutive state championships, led by Vern Bradburn as head coach.

In January 1955, Central began accepting black students for the first time under a plan adopted the previous year by the Board of Education in response to the Brown v. Board of Education decision. Despite the Board of Education's claim that integration was accomplished smoothly district-wide, in December 1957 more than 50 white students stayed out of school in protest due to a dispute between a white and black student, leading to the dispatch of a dozen police officers to disperse the crowd. According to the principal of Central, the two students had argued over ownership of a sweater, and the white student was assaulted. Despite the protest outside, most of the school's 1,300 students remained in class; two students who refused police orders to disperse were arrested but later released.

Despite de jure integration, the St. Louis Public Schools kept no official records on the race of students from 1954 to 1963 in an effort to maintain a "color blind" policy. As part of this policy, the district took steps to ensure that black students remained in black schools or in self-contained classrooms and playgrounds at white schools, and throughout the 1960s, Central had a predominantly white population. As white families moved out of Central's zone during the early 1970s, violence broke out between remaining white students and increasing numbers of black students. In March 1979, Jesse Jackson visited the school to ameliorate tensions, and by 1980, the school's population was 95 percent black.

During the 1970s, the St. Louis Public Schools implemented magnet schools; as part of this process, in 1976 the district opened Visual and Performing Arts High School (VPA) as a small learning community magnet school within the O'Fallon Technical High School building on McRee Avenue. VPA moved to the Humboldt School building on 9th Street during the late 1970s, and in 1984, VPA moved again when it merged with Central High School; the combined school, Central VPA, continued to operate at Central's Garrison Avenue location.

=== Recent history and moves: 1984–present ===
In early 1988, plans were announced to close the Central VPA building on Garrison Avenue for renovations and transfer its students to McKinley High School for one year. About 800 Central VPA students joined approximately 120 McKinley mass media magnet school students at the McKinley building, while 330 non-magnet students at McKinley were transferred to other comprehensive schools in the district. The renovations at Central VPA, planned to cost $6 million, were part of a $114 million district capital improvement plan. Renovations to the Garrison Avenue building eventually exceeded $7.5 million, although they were completed in time for the 1989–1990 school year.

Among the improvements to the school was a full renovation of the theater, which included removal of the structurally unsafe balcony, installation of acoustical panels, and construction of a light and sound booth in the rear of the auditorium. In addition, the renovations included a new foyer for the theater, a new fire alarm and sprinkler system, new aluminum windows, a new art studio on the building roof, a library expansion, and updates to science laboratories. After the renovations were completed, Central VPA students returned for the 1989–1990 school year.

Upon the reopening of the Garrison Avenue building, the Anheuser-Busch company donated an aluminum statue of William Shakespeare to the school. The school also won praise as an example of the success of the magnet school program by the U.S. District Court judge overseeing the desegregation case that created magnet schools in St. Louis:

For illustration, Central High School has been physically refurbished and is now meeting its needs as a performing arts high school. The leadership there is excellent; racial quotas have been met; enrollment is full.

— Stephen N. Limbaugh, Sr.,

Locations of Central High School
Year(s)	Address	Neighborhood
1853–1855	400 N. 6th Street	Downtown
1855–1893	300 N. 15th St.	Downtown West
1893–1927	1020 N. Grand Ave.	JeffVanderLou
1927–1988	3616 Garrison Ave.	JeffVanderLou
1988–1989	2156 Russell Blvd.	McKinley Heights
1989–2004	3616 Garrison Ave.	JeffVanderLou
2004–present	3125 S. Kingshighway	Southwest Garden

Despite the renovations of 1988–1989, within a decade the school building again was in need of significant repairs. During the late 1990s, several ceilings in the building had collapsed due to roof leaks, while the building suffered from a rodent and insect infestation. By 2002, the building's roof leaked into the music wing and windows were stuck open in the auditorium leading to interior problems. Supplies and money for extra rehearsals also were in short supply, and teachers complained that both the cafeteria and the theater seated only half of the 500 students at the school. The principal of the school, John Niemeyer, noted that budget cuts and paperwork problems were to blame for many issues and argued that the building was not suited for a performing arts school.

As a result of deteriorating conditions at Central VPA, the St. Louis Board of Education heard several proposals on moving Central VPA to another building. Among the options considered at a meeting in November 2002 was to renovate the Kiel Opera House as an academic facility and performing arts venue; although the proposal to move to Kiel was not adopted, the Board committed to replacing the high school's building in the near term. In the summer of 2004, the Board announced that Central VPA would move into the former Southwest High School building at the corner of S. Kingshighway and Arsenal. As of January 2012, the Garrison Avenue building, home to Yeatman High School from 1904 to 1927 and to Central from 1927 to 2004, is for sale for $250,000.

In December 2008 as part of a promotional tour, actor Will Smith visited students at Central VPA and viewed them conducting a dance routine to one of his songs. As of the 2010–2011 school year, Central VPA began no longer offering programs in television or radio. In addition, Central discontinued its sports program in order to use the money to help fund the remaining arts programs.

On October 17, 2012, the Garrison Avenue building was added to the National Register of Historic Places.

=== Mass shooting ===
On October 24, 2022, a 19-year-old former student shot and killed two people in a mass shooting at the institution, before being killed in a shootout with responding police officers.

== Current status ==
As of the 2025–2026 school year, Central VPA operates on a 7:15 am to 2:12 pm schedule.

=== Activities ===
For the 2011–2012 school year, the school offered only two activities approved by the Missouri State High School Activities Association (MSHSAA): band, orchestra and vocal music, and speech and debate; the school does not sponsor athletic teams. In addition to its current activities, its students have won three state championships:

- Baseball: 1950, 1951, 1952

The school also has produced four singles tennis state champions and three individual wrestling champions.

=== Demographics ===
Enrollment, racial demographics, and free or reduced price lunches
Year	Enrollment	Black (%)	White (%)	Hispanic (%)	Asian (%)	Free/reduced lunch (%)
2011	552	72.4	21.8	3.3	2.5	83.5
2010	694	73.5	21.3	3.2	1.9	80.9
2009	781	71.7	24.2	2.0	1.8	63.2
2008	688	69.2	25.9	2.9	1.9	58.0
2007	623	69.3	27.1	2.6	0.6	69.3
2006	584	65.2	31.5	2.2	0.7	66.7
2005	541	65.1	32.5	1.8	0.4	61.6
2004	507	65.1	33.7	1.0	0.2	64.6
2003	493	65.9	33.3	0.6	0.2	63.8
2002	616	64.4	34.1	1.0	0.5	65.5

=== Academic and discipline issues ===
Central VPA has a higher graduation rate of 87.7 for 2010–2011, higher than the state average of 79.8. Central VPA also has a discipline incident rate of 3.3 percent. Since the passage of No Child Left Behind in 2001, Central VPA met the requirements for adequate yearly progress (AYP) in communication arts in 2006 and 2011; it met AYP in mathematics in 2011. In addition, more than 80 percent of Central VPA graduates enrolled in a public university in Missouri required remedial coursework in either English or mathematics.

Graduation and dropout rates by year
Year	Graduates	Cohort dropouts‡	Graduation rate†	Total dropouts‡	Dropout rate†
2011	164	23	87.7	34	6.8
2010	149	37	80.1	33	5.1
2009	122	46	72.6	32	4.3
2008	107	42	71.8	39	5.7
2007	110	29	79.1	24	3.7
2006	86	19	81.9	85	15.8
2005	118	13	90.1	34	6.3
2004	93	9	91.2	14	2.8
2003	97	25	79.5	5	1.0
2002	114	40	74.2	20	3.4
‡ Cohort dropouts is the number of students from the grade level graduating for that year who dropped out. † Graduation rate is calculated as number of graduates divided by number of graduates plus dropouts, multiplied by 100. ‡ Total dropouts is the number of students at the school who dropped out of school during that school year. † Dropout rate is calculated as number of total dropouts/(September enrollment plus transfers in and minus transfers out + September enrollment)/2).

Incident rates by year
Year	Enrollment	Incidents‡	Incident rate†
2011	522	17	3.3
2010	694	16	2.3
2009	782	71	9.1
2008	688	38	5.5
2007	623	0	0.0
2006	584	20	3.4
2005	541	14	2.6
2004	507	8	1.6
2003	493	2	0.4
2002	616	4	0.6
‡ Total incidents is the number of incidents in which as a result a student was removed for ten or more consecutive days from a traditional classroom. † Incident rate is calculated as enrollment divided by total incidents.

== Notable people ==
=== Faculty ===
- Helen Almira Shafer: Later president of Wellesley College

=== Alumni ===
- Ray Armstead: Olympic gold medalist runner
- Hettie Barnhill: Dancer and choreographer
- Frank Baumann: Major League Baseball player
- Freeman Bosley, Jr.: 43rd Mayor of St. Louis
- Al Caldwell: R&B musician and producer
- Cecil Cunningham: Film and stage actress, singer and comedienne
- Richard Fortus: Guitarist with Guns N' Roses
- Nathan Frank: Member of the United States House of Representatives
- Walker Hancock: Sculptor and winner of the Medal of Freedom and National Medal of Arts
- Fannie Hurst: Author
- Fred Koenig: Major League Baseball player, manager, coach
- Frederick Kreismann: 31st Mayor of St. Louis
- Breckinridge Long: U.S. Ambassador to Italy
- Julius B. Maller (1901–1959), educator and sociologist
- Agnes Moorehead: Film actress, winner of the Golden Globe Award and Emmy Award
- Ben Moreell: U.S. Navy admiral, founder of the Seabees
- Sam Muchnick: Professional wrestling promoter
- Charles Nagel: Founder of the United States Chamber of Commerce and Secretary of Commerce and Labor
- David Merrick: Tony Award-winning Broadway producer
- Edgar Monsanto Queeny: Industrialist and chairman of Monsanto
- Siegfried Reinhardt: Painter and stained glass artist
- Alexander Stavenitz (1901–1960), Russian Empire-born American visual artist
- Larry Whisenton: Major League Baseball player
- Ryan Koenig: Musician, recording artist, songwriter, and producer
- Angela Walton Mosley: MO State Senator, District 13
