= Fox Park, St. Louis =

Neighborhood of St. Louis, Missouri

Coordinates: 38.6084°N 90.2258°W

Fox Park
- Neighborhood of St. Louis
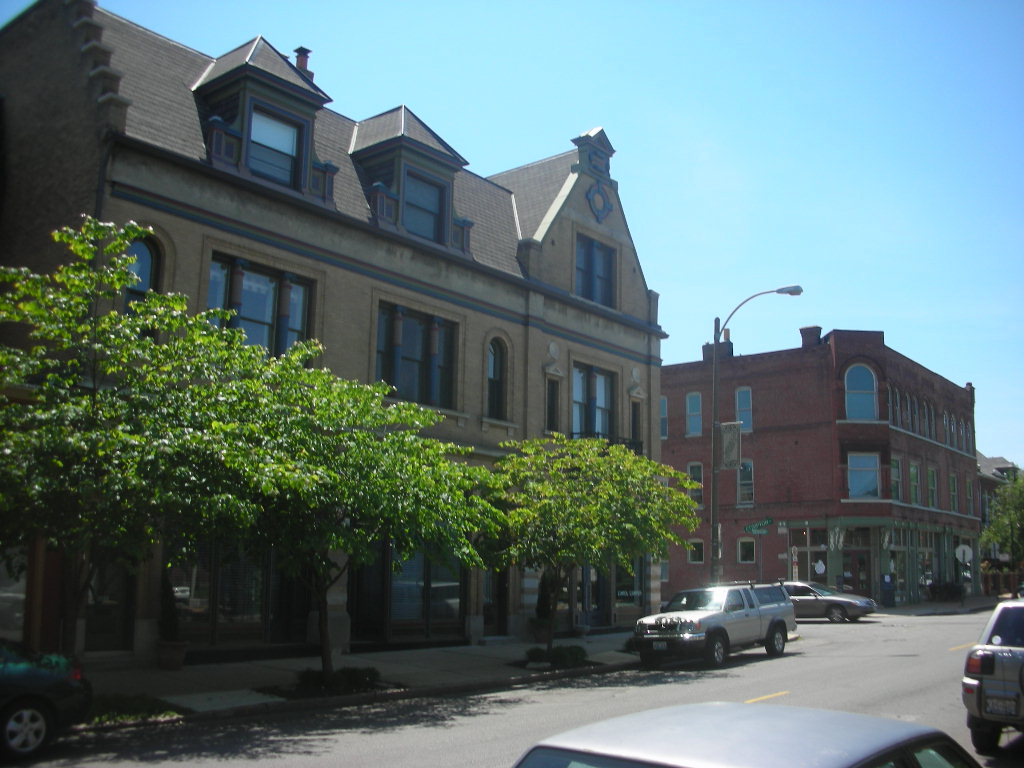

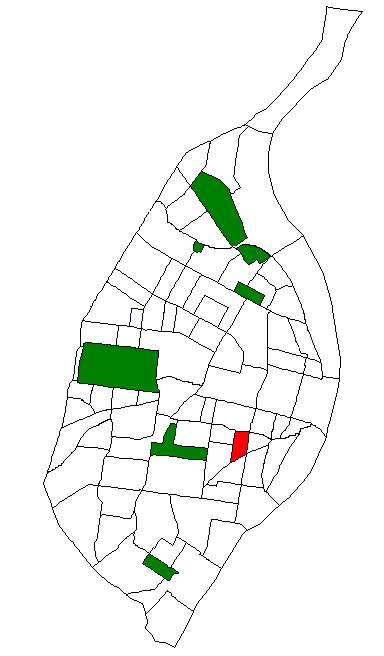
- Location (red) of Fox Park within the City of St. Louis
- Country: United States
- State: Missouri
- City: St. Louis
- Wards: 7

Government
  - Aldermen: Alisha Sonnier

Area
  - Total: 0.28 sq mi (0.73 km^{2})

Population (2020)
  - Total: 2,545
  - Density: 9,100/sq mi (3,500/km^{2})
- ZIP code(s): Parts of 63104, 63118
- Area code(s): 314
- Website: foxparkstl.org

Fox Park is a neighborhood of St. Louis, Missouri. It is bound by Jefferson Avenue to the east, Interstate 44 to the north, Gravois Avenue to the south and Nebraska Avenue to the west. It borders the neighborhoods of Gate District, Compton Heights, Tower Grove East, Benton Park West, and McKinley Heights.

== History ==
In the early 1880s, Fox Park was an ethnic enclave for German Americans and Slavs, particularly those of the middle and working class. At the time, it was home to many craftsmen, which resulted in the neighborhood being home to notable works of architecture. The historic church St. Francis de Sales Oratory, as well as the Fox Park Historic District, are listed in the National Register of Historic Places.

By the 1990s, Fox Park was neglected by its landlords and rising in crime. Drug dealing was a concern, with President George H. W. Bush speaking in the neighborhood in 1992.

Revitalization for the later came, through policing and landlord efforts. The revitalization led to criticism for gentrification, though the neighborhood has affordable housing. In 2024, Emily Standlee of Feast Magazine wrote that the neighborhood had some of St. Louis' best restaurants.

Fox Park shares its name with a nearby public park.

== Demographics ==
Historical population
Census	Pop.	Note	%±
1990	5,092		—
2000	3,175		−37.6%
2010	2,632		−17.1%
2020	2,545		−3.3%

In 2020, the neighborhood's population was 48.9% Black, 41.4% White, 4.8% Hispanic or Latino, 5.4% Two or More Races, 2.9% Some Other Race, 1.3% Asian, and 0.1% Native American/Alaska Native.
