= Jefferson Avenue (St. Louis) =

- Interactive map of Jefferson Avenue
- Owner: City of St. Louis
- Maintained by: St. Louis City Street Department
- Length: 5.1 mi (8.2 km)
- Location: St. Louis, Missouri
- Nearest metro station: Union Station
- South end: Route 366 / Broadway in Marine Villa
- Major junctions: Route 30 in Benton Park; I-44 in McKinley Heights; Route 100 in Lafayette Square; I-64 / US 40 in Downtown West; Route D in Downtown West
- North end: Palm Street / Farrar Street in JeffVanderLou

Jefferson Avenue is a major, seven lane wide, north to south thoroughfare in the city of St. Louis, Missouri. For much of its run in south city Jefferson Avenue and Grand Boulevard take a parallel course, separated by about sixteen blocks. In the northern city, their concurrence varies some.

== Transportation ==
Jefferson Avenue does not connect to the Metrolink light rail service, but MetroBus route 11 (Chippewa) does travel along much of the route.

== Places on Jefferson Avenue ==
- JeffVanderLou neighborhood
- St. Louis Place neighborhood
- Carr Square neighborhood
- Midtown neighborhood
- Downtown West neighborhood
- Gate District neighborhood
- Lafayette Square neighborhood
- McKinley Heights neighborhood
- Fox Park neighborhood
- Gravois Park, St. Louis neighborhood
- Marine Villa, St. Louis neighborhood
- Benton Park neighborhood
- Benton Park West neighborhood
- Jefferson Underground Building (2400 S. Jefferson Ave.) now home of Arch Reactor hackerspace

== See also ==
- Streetcars in St. Louis, Missouri
