= Cherokee Street (St. Louis) =

Street in St. Louis, Missouri, U.S.

- Owner: City of St. Louis
- Maintained by: Streets Dept
- West end: Grand Blvd
- Major junctions: Route 30; Jefferson Ave
- East end: Broadway

Other
- Known for: Latine neighborhood, Antique Row, nightlife

Cherokee Street is a culturally significant east-west street in South City, St. Louis, Missouri. Its western border is Grand Boulevard and its eastern border is Broadway.

The Cherokee Street district is historically eclectic and home to a significant Latine community, restaurants, shops, nightlife, arts galleries, historical architecture, the Antique Row, and coworking spaces and business incubators. It is the site of a large annual Cinco de Mayo celebration and the coincident People's Joy Parade, as well as Fiestas Patrias, hosted by Latinos en Axión. There are entrances to the caves of St. Louis along the street, now inaccessible to the public, and these caves were historically important for economic development as natural cooling for the significant brewery industry of St. Louis, such as the operations that occurred at the extant landmark Lemp Brewery located on the eastern side of the street (Lemp Mansion abuts the street, just north of Chatillon–DeMenil House). There are others buildings on the National Register of Historic Places, as well as the entire Tower Grove Heights Historic District.

Neighborhoods inclusive of or bordering Cherokee Street (from west to east) are Tower Grove East, Gravois Park, Benton Park West, Benton Park, and Marine Villa. Cherokee Street is adjacent to the South Grand/Tower Grove Park and Soulard districts. It is served by MetroBus routes which connect to the MetroLink light rail system. Historically, Cherokee was a major service area of the streetcars in St. Louis.

The Cherokee Station Business Association commissioned an "indigenous American" statue purported to be a Cherokee man in 1985 but this was removed in 2021 to be stored at the National Building Arts Center, located across the nearby Mississippi River in Metro East Illinois.

== See also ==
- Streets of St. Louis
