= JVL =

JVL may refer to:

- JeffVanderLou, St. Louis, a neighborhood of Missouri
- Jewish Virtual Library, an online encyclopedia
- Jewish Voice for Liberation, a British organisation for Jewish members of the Labour Party
- Johnsonville Line (timetable code: JVL), Wellington, New Zealand
- Jonathan V. Last (born 1974), American journalist and author
- Southern Wisconsin Regional Airport (IATA code: JVL), a public airport Rock County, Wisconsin, United States
