= Benton Park, St. Louis =

Neighborhood of St. Louis in Missouri, US

Coordinates: 38.6008°N 90.2200°W

Benton Park
- Neighborhood of St. Louis
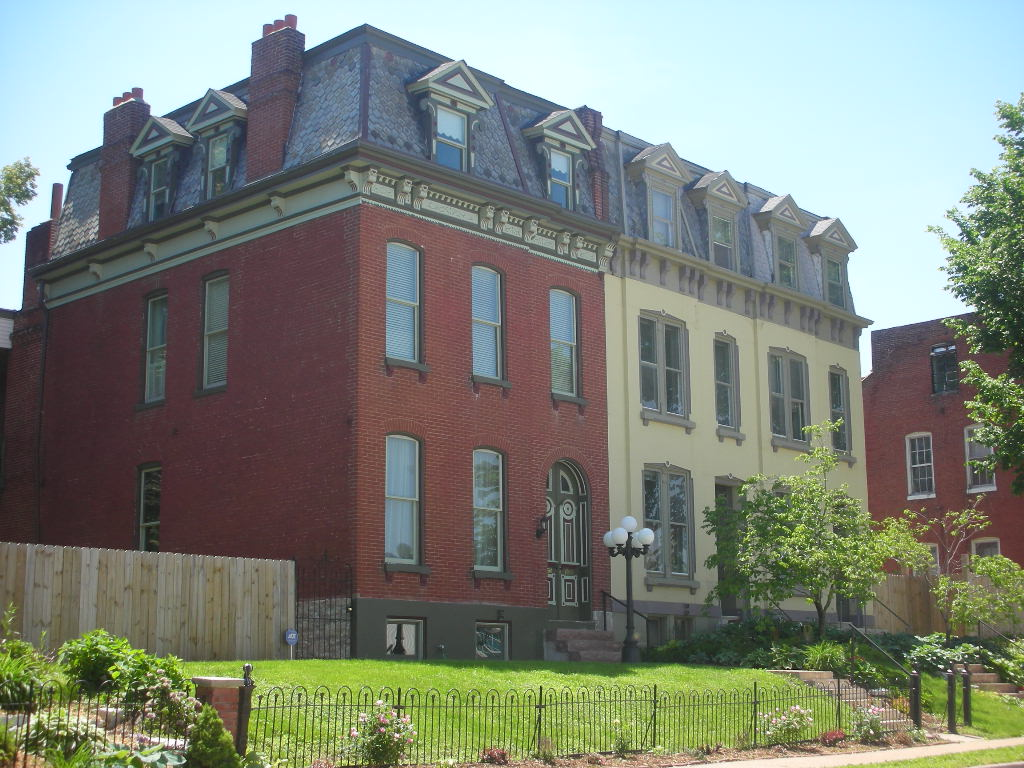
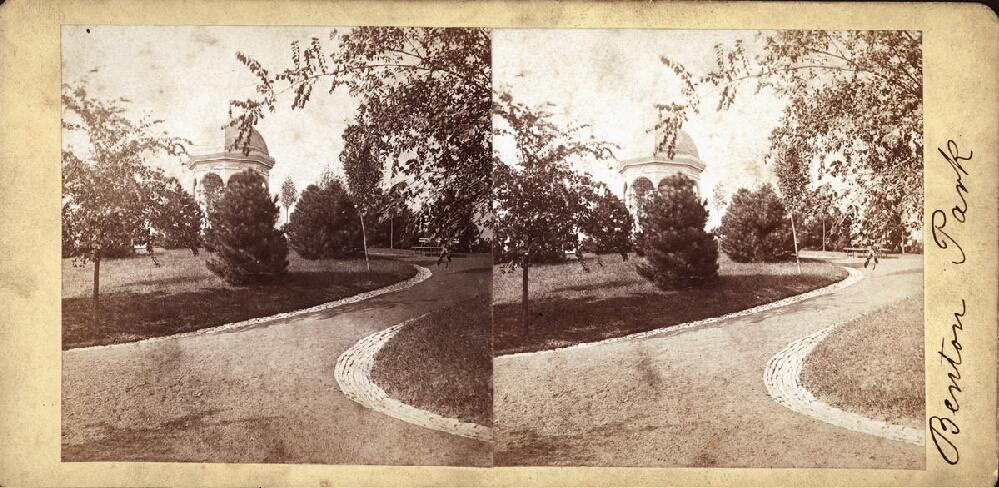
- Townhouses in Benton Park Benton Park. VM90-000211. Stereograph photograph by Boehl and Koenig, ca. 1875 . Missouri Historical Society Photographs and Prints Collections.

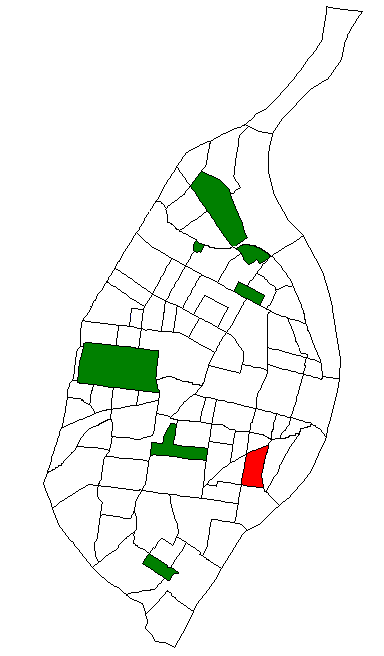
- Location (red) of Benton Park within St. Louis
- Country: United States
- State: Missouri
- City: St. Louis
- Ward: 8

Government
  - Alderperson: Jami Cox Antwi

Area
  - Total: 0.48 sq mi (1.2 km^{2})

Population (2020)
  - Total: 3,581
  - Density: 7,500/sq mi (2,900/km^{2})

Demographics 2020
  - White: 68.1%
  - Black: 22.3%
  - Hispanic: 3.8%
  - Asian: 1.3%
  - Other: 7.2%
- ZIP code(s): Parts of 63104, 63118
- Area code(s): 314
- Website: stlouis-mo.gov

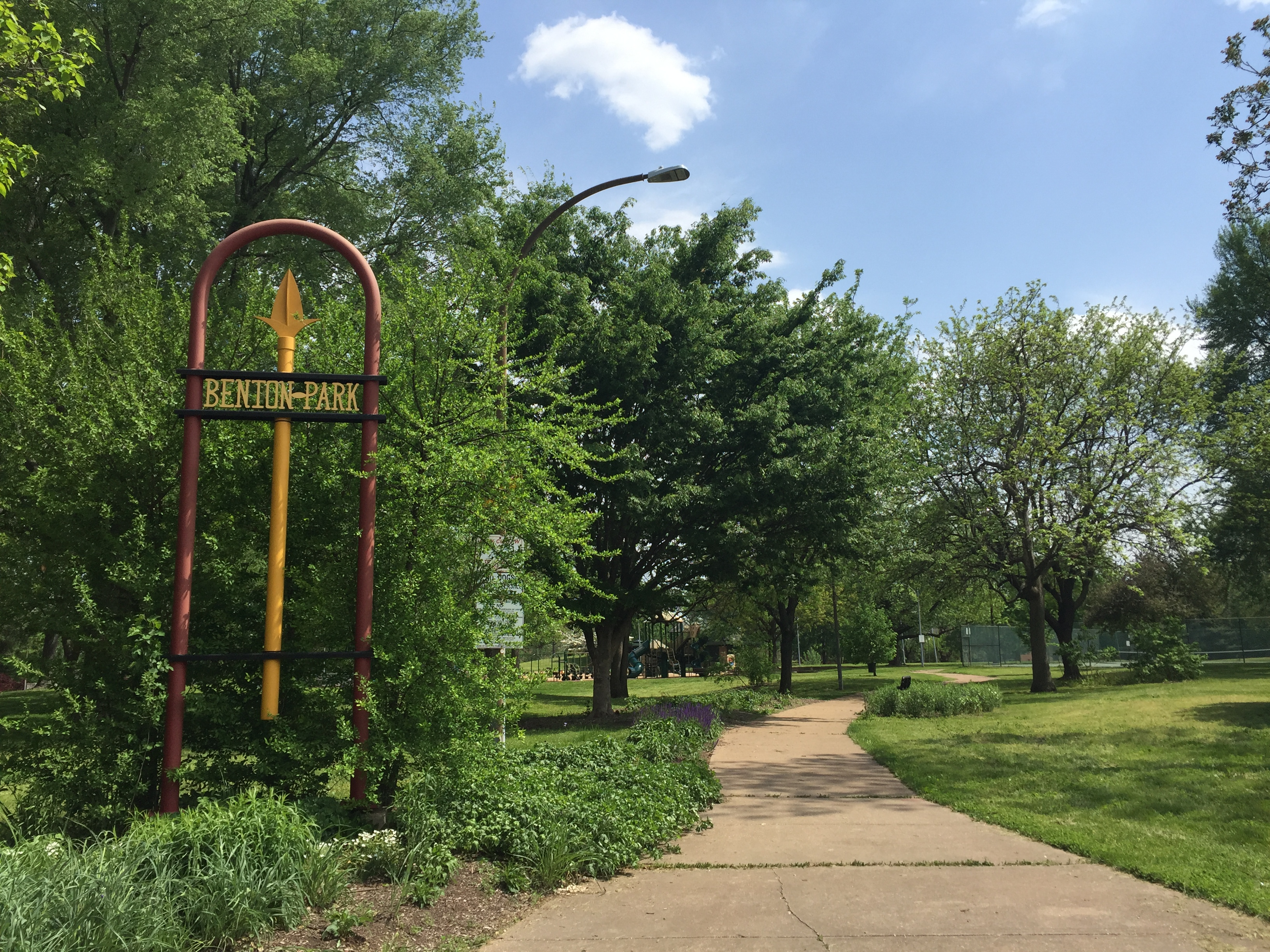
Benton Park in the neighborhood of the same name, May 2018

Benton Park is a neighborhood in southside St. Louis, Missouri, just west of the Soulard neighborhood. The official boundaries of the area are Gravois Avenue on the north, Cherokee Street on the south, I-55 on the east, and Jefferson Avenue on the west. Benton Park is unrelated to Benton Place, a private street located in Lafayette Square, St. Louis.

== History ==
The area now comprising Benton Park proper was first used as the City Cemetery, from 1842 to 1865. Those buried in the cemetery were relocated in 1865, and the neighborhood was created on June 25, 1866, by city ordinance. The site of the park was originally 17 acres, but was reduced to 14 1/3 acres to accommodate perimeter streets. Noted horticulturist Edward F. Krausnick landscaped the park, incorporating a greenhouse, a footbridge, and two ponds. The park was used for botanical instruction and community activities and today is a popular recreational area.

Originally named City Park, the park was later renamed after Thomas Hart Benton, the first U.S. Senator representing the people of Missouri. As the neighborhood grew, it attracted several breweries due to its location above a system of caves that were ideal for beer storage, or "lagering" in German, as many of the popular German styles require. The caves maintain a constant 55 degree temperature that is ideal for beer storage. Today, all of the cave entrances are sealed. One such cave, the McHose & English Cave, is said to run underneath Benton Park to the Lemp Brewery, several blocks to the southeast. The Lemp Brewery was one of the most notable of the city's breweries, which still stands today, although defunct.

== Demographics ==
Historical population
| Census | Pop. | Note | %± |
|---|---|---|---|
| 1990 | 4,396 | | — |
| 2000 | 3,946 | | −10.2% |
| 2010 | 3,532 | | −10.5% |
| 2020 | 3,581 | | 1.4% |

In 2020 Benton Park's racial makeup was 68.1% White, 22.3% Black, 0.4% Native American, 1.3% Asian, 6.8% two or more races, and 1.1% some other race. 3.8% of the population was of Hispanic or Latino origin.

== See also ==
- Gus's Pretzels the local pretzel bakery, that has been open since 1920.
- Lemp Neighborhood Arts Center, the non-profit & DIY performance space, art gallery, and community center, open since 1994.

== Sources ==
- "National Register of Historic Places - Nomination Form" (PDF). Missouri Department of Natural Resources.
