= Marine Villa, St. Louis =

Neighborhood of St. Louis in Missouri, US

Coordinates: 38.5874°N 90.2203°W

Marine Villa
- Neighborhood of St. Louis
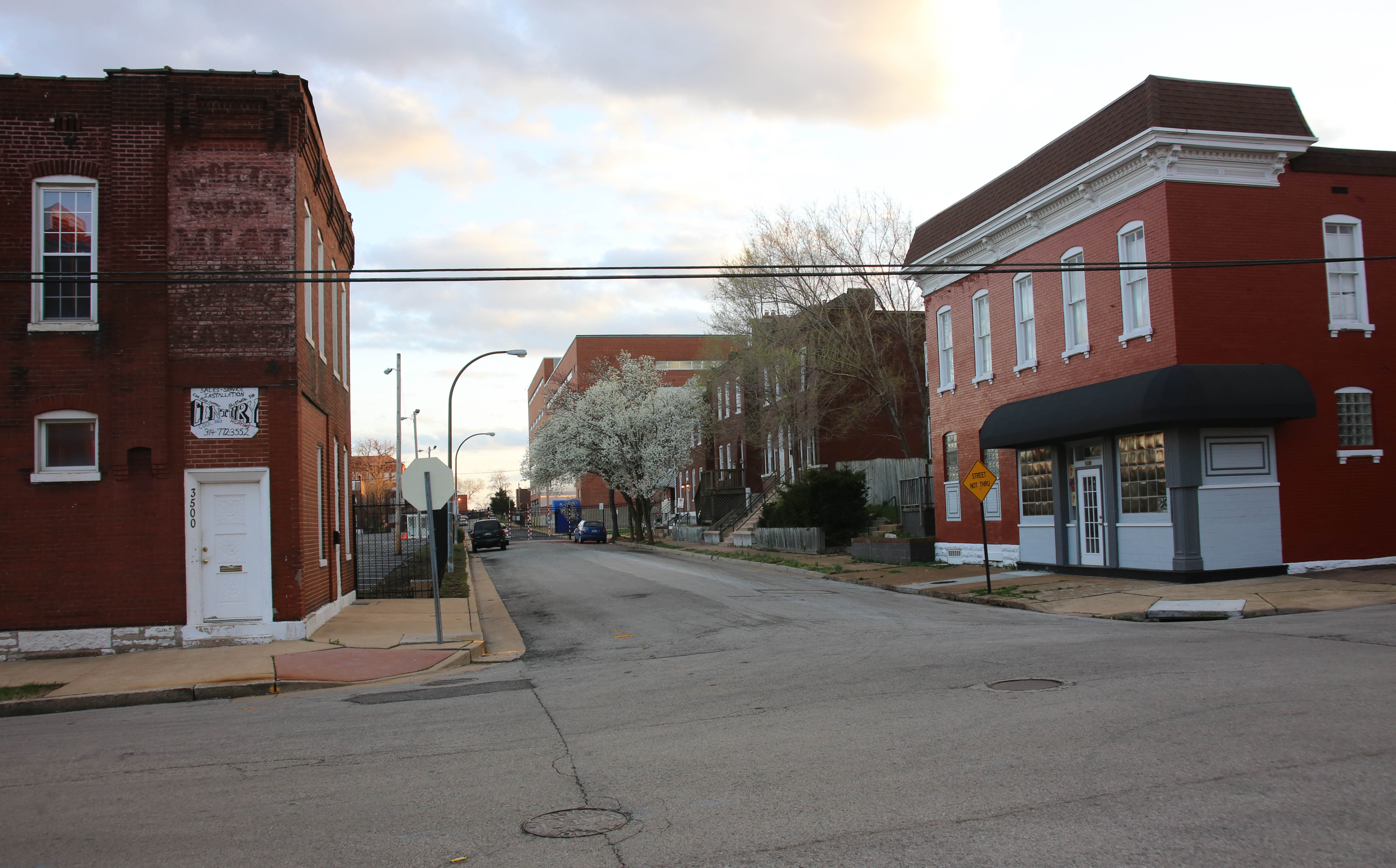
- Looking south on Indiana Avenue at Potomac Street in Marine Villa

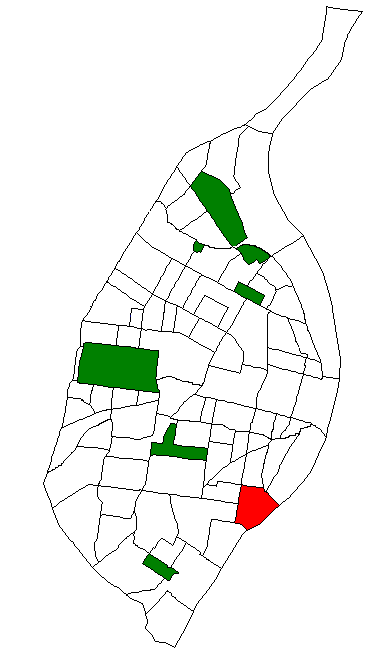
- Location (red) of Marine Villa within St. Louis
- Country: United States
- State: Missouri
- City: St. Louis
- Ward: 8

Government
  - Aldermen: Jami Cox Antwi

Area
  - Total: 0.65 sq mi (1.7 km^{2})

Population (2020)
  - Total: 2,530
  - Density: 3,900/sq mi (1,500/km^{2})
- ZIP code(s): Part of 63118
- Area code(s): 314
- Website: stlouis-mo.gov

Marine Villa is a neighborhood of St. Louis, Missouri. The neighborhood is located just south of the large and historic Anheuser-Busch Brewery complex along the bluffs of the Mississippi River. It is further defined by Cherokee Street's Antique Row on the north, Gasconade Street on the south, South Broadway and Jefferson Avenue on the west, and the Mississippi River on the east.

The Marine Villa neighborhood lies along the Mississippi River, just a few miles south of downtown St. Louis. Originally part of the St. Louis Commons, this area was subdivided and gridded in 1855, with many of the early developments in the neighborhood being small farms and brickyards. Some of the oldest buildings in the neighborhood are small frame and brick farmhouses built in the 1860s, many in the form of a flounder house, a simple but unique vernacular home, often of one-and-a-half stories with a shed roof. With the construction of a north/south roadway called Carondelet Avenue, Marine Villa was able to continue developing as the city's population grew and expanded from the downtown core. The Lemp Brewery relocated from downtown to the northern edge of the Marine Villa neighborhood in the 1860s, and the neighborhood saw an influx of German immigrants who came to the neighborhood to work at several of the nearby breweries, including Lemp, Anheuser-Busch, and the Cherokee Brewery.

In 1890 the streetcar came through the neighborhood, creating an explosion in population and construction. Most of those buildings are still standing, and give the neighborhood its dense, diverse and historic architectural character. Along with the streetcar route, bustling commercial districts developed along Cherokee Street, South Broadway and Jefferson Avenue. Constructed entirely of brick, most of these commercial buildings are of two or three story construction, with first floor storefronts and residences above. Many are used today as they were originally intended, with small businesses occupying the first floor. These commercial districts are now home to the Chippewa-Broadway Business Association and the Cherokee Antique Row District. Surrounding the shopping districts the neighborhood is characterized by single and multi-family historic brick homes, built primarily in the late 19th and early 20th centuries. These homes exhibit a range of architectural styles, including Second Empire, Queen Anne, Italianate, Craftsman, and many localized and vernacular interpretations of the more recognized styles.

== Demographics ==
Historical population
Census	Pop.	Note	%±
1990	3,624		—
2000	2,909		−19.7%
2010	2,691		−7.5%
2020	2,530		−6.0%

In 2020 the neighborhood's racial makeup was 48.0% Black, 35.3% White, 0.7% Native American, 1.1% Asian, 9.1% Two or More Races and 5.8% Some Other Race. 10.1% of the population was of Hispanic or Latino origin.

== See also ==
- Marine Villa Neighborhood Historic District
