= Flounder house =

Architectural style

A flounder house has a shed roof and lacks windows and doors on its tallest wall.

A flounder house is a term used in some areas to describe a type of house with a roof with a single slope, rather than the double slope of gabled roof. Some are oriented so that the shed roof runs perpendicular to the facade, in these tallest wall of the house lacks windows and doors. The house may align with a property edge, sit at the back of its lot, or align with other houses on its street. Others have a different number of apparent stories on the facade and the rear elevation, with the ridge line running parallel the facade.

Though modern examples exist, most flounder houses date from the 18th or 19th century. They can be found in cities in the United States from the Mississippi River Valley to the East Coast.

The flounder house's namesake is the similarly asymmetrical flounder fish.

== Origin ==
The motivation for building flounder houses is debated. Common folklore follow one of three themes: "a result of an early restrictive building ordinance, the original owner's plan for future expansion, or a desire to reduce property taxes." In fact, shed roofed buildings are often simply the cheapest to construct.

Residents of various cities with shed-roofed houses believe that these houses are indigenous to their city.

== Examples ==
Shed-roof houses can be found across the United States, including in St Louis, Missouri; Cincinnati, Ohio; Pittsburgh and Philadelphia, Pennsylvania; Charleston, South Carolina; Fredericksburg and Alexandria, Virginia; Baltimore, Maryland; New Castle, Delaware; and Boston, Massachusetts. The term "flounder", though, is not used in most of these locations.

277 flounder houses have been cataloged in St. Louis, Missouri as of July 2015. The Cassey House is a flounder house in Philadelphia, Pennsylvania.

In 1960, Alexandria, Virginia, may have had 75 flounder houses, dramatically fewer than the 1500 flounder houses estimated to have existed there in the 19th century. A parsonage built in 1787 claims the distinction of oldest flounder house in Alexandria.

== Legacy ==
The Cultural Resources Office of St. Louis began a survey in 2015, in order to better preserve the city's flounder houses. Individuals have also taken interest in flounder houses, sometimes incorporating historical houses into modern renovations.

In The Carlisle Chronicles, a 1986 mystery trilogy by Norma Johnston, the protagonists' family lives in a flounder house designed to avoid a glass tax.

== See also ==
- Cassey House
- Flounder House at the Old Presbyterian Meeting House
- Marine Villa, St. Louis
- Architecture of St. Louis
- List of house styles
- List of house types
