= Marine Villa Neighborhood Historic District =

Historic district in Missouri, United States

- U.S. National Register of Historic Places
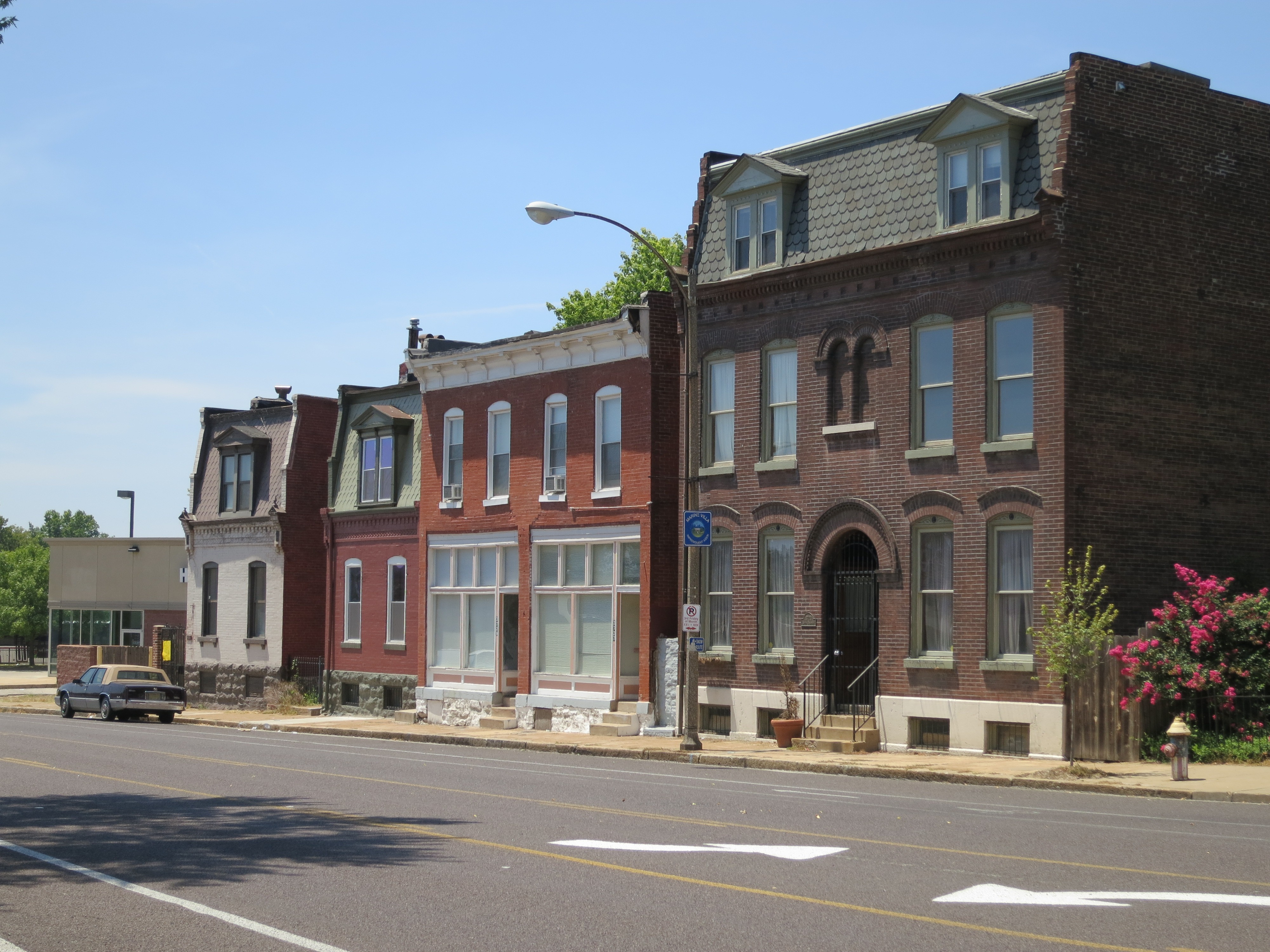
- Houses on South Broadway

- Location within St. Louis Location within Missouri Location within the United States
- Location: Roughly bounded by S. Broadway, Chippewa, Cahokia, Kosciusko & Winnebago, St. Louis, Missouri
- Coordinates: 38°35′12″N 90°13′24″W
- Area: 30.5 acres (12.3 ha)
- MPS: South St. Louis Historic Working and Middle Class Streetcar Suburbs MPS
- NRHP reference No.: 09001099
- Added to NRHP: December 18, 2009

The Marine Villa Neighborhood Historic District is a residential historic district in the Marine Villa neighborhood of St. Louis, Missouri, United States. The district encompasses ten blocks and includes 356 buildings and sites, 187 of which are considered contributing resources to the district's historic character. Construction in the area began in 1870, but poor infrastructure and street access limited settlement. A streetcar line opened on South Broadway in 1890, leading the district to develop into one of St. Louis' many streetcar suburbs of the era. Most of the neighborhood's early residents were working-class and middle-class German immigrants and their families. The district's buildings are mainly one- and two-story brick buildings, and as the majority were built by individual property owners, they feature a wide variety of styles and shapes; the architectural styles used in the district include Spanish Colonial Revival, Romanesque Revival, Colonial Revival, Tudor Revival, Italianate, and Second Empire.

The district was added to the National Register of Historic Places on December 18, 2009.
