= Gus' Pretzels =

Bakeries of the United States

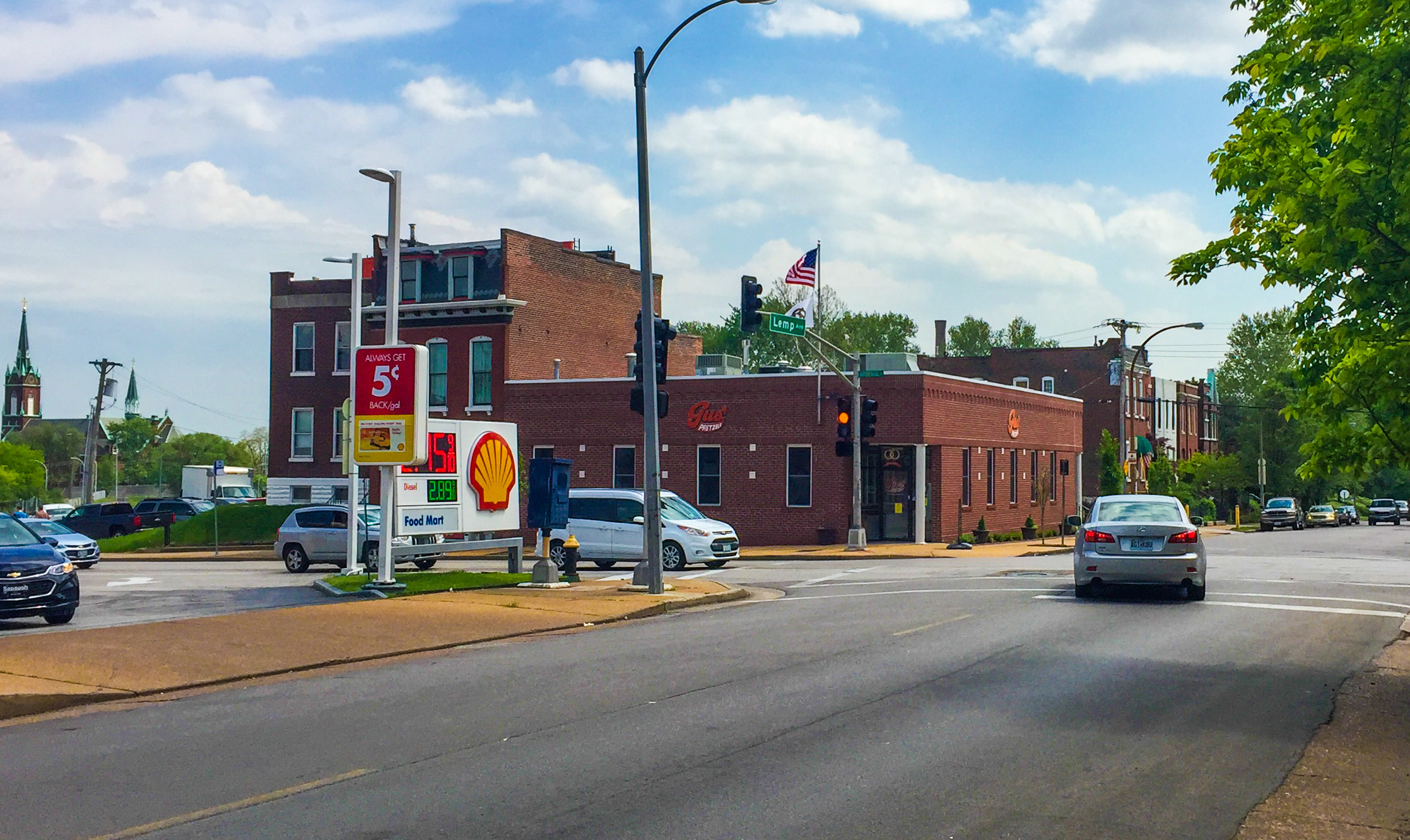
- Gus' Pretzels, May 2018
- Interactive map of Gus' Pretzels

Restaurant information
- Established: 1920
- Location: 1820 Arsenal Street, St Louis, MO, USA
- Coordinates: 38.5969°N 90.2175°W
- Website: http://guspretzels.com/

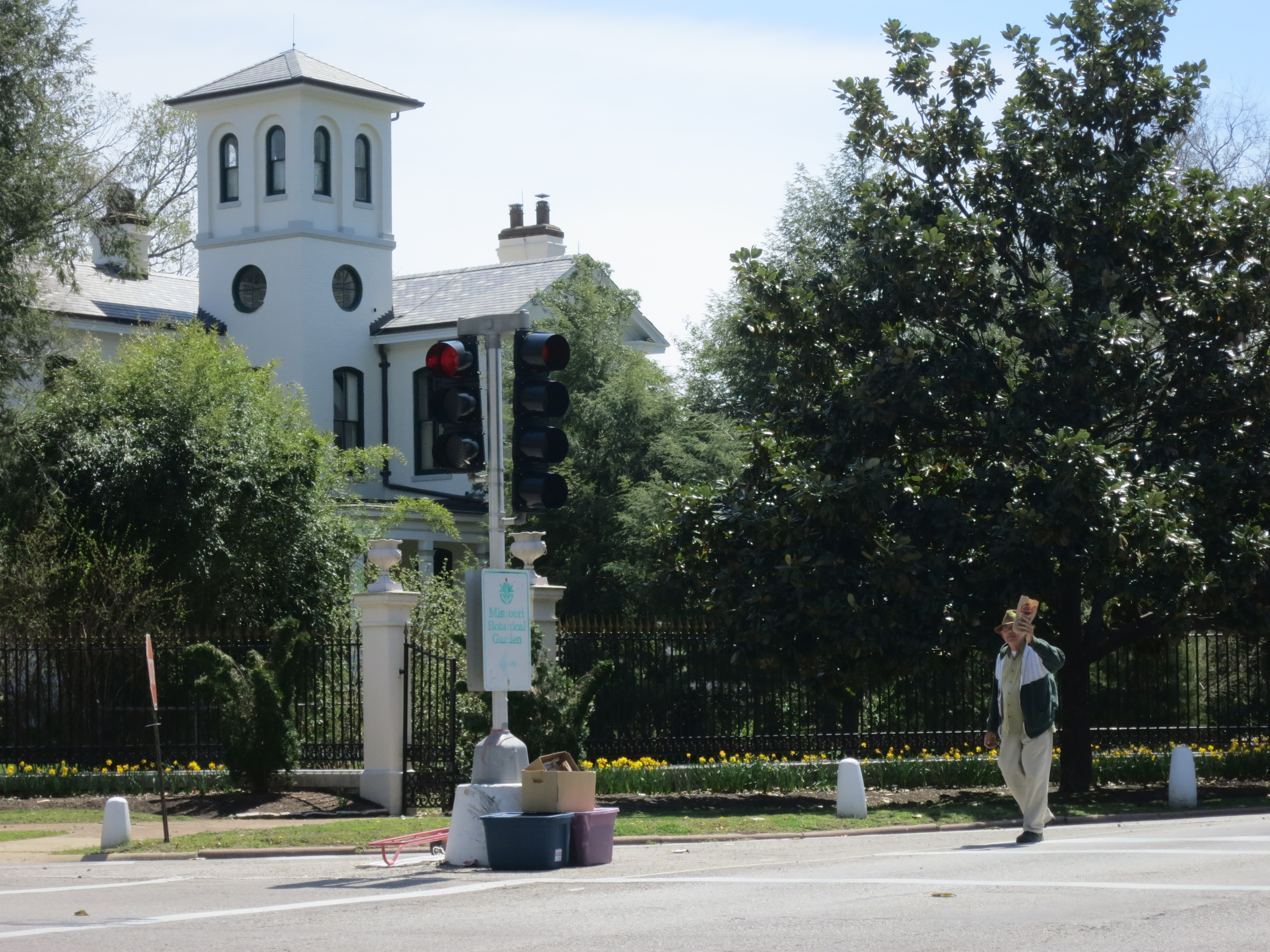
Gus' Pretzels for sale at Tower Grove and Magnolia, April 2013

Gus' Pretzels is a pretzel bakery and snack counter in the Benton Park neighborhood of St. Louis, Missouri, United States. It was opened in 1920 by Frank Ramsperger. Gus' is a third generation family business owned by the Koebbe family. It is located at 1820 Arsenal Street near the Anheuser-Busch brewery.

Fresh pretzels are emblematic of the German American culture and community that have been prominent in St Louis.

It won a Family Business Award from the St. Louis Business Journal in 2019.

Gus's Pretzels has been a baker for street vendors, though only a few remain.

== See also ==
- Pretzels in the United States of America
- Gooey butter cake, another product of St. Louis German bakers
