= 2022 Central Visual and Performing Arts High School shooting =

Mass shooting in Missouri, U.S.

- A still image taken from security video at CVPA depicting Harris in a hallway.

- Location of shooting (Missouri) Location of shooting (the United States)
- Location: 38.6046°N 90.2709°W; Central Visual and Performing Arts High School, 3125 S Kingshighway Blvd; St. Louis, Missouri, U.S.
- Date: October 24, 2022; 4 years ago 9:08 – 9:25 a.m. (CDT; UTC−05:00)
- Target: Students and Staff at Central Visual and Performing Arts High School
- Attack type: Mass shooting, school shooting, shootout
- Weapon: Palmetto State Armory PA-15 AR-15-style semi-automatic rifle
- Deaths: 3 (including the perpetrator)
- Injuries: 7 (4 by gunfire)
- Perpetrator: Orlando DeShawn Harris

On October 24, 2022, a mass shooting occurred at Central Visual and Performing Arts High School in the Southwest Garden neighborhood of St. Louis, Missouri, United States when 19-year-old Orlando Harris, a former student at the school, opened fire on students and staff, killing two and injuring seven before being fatally shot by police.

== Background ==
Central Visual and Performing Arts High School uses the code word "Miles Davis is in the building" to alert students and staff of an active shooter in the building. The school also has several metal detectors, and seven security guards were present on the day of the shooting.

Missouri does not have a red flag law which permits a state court to order the temporary removal of firearms from a person who they believe may present a danger to others or themselves.

== Shooting ==
On October 24, 2022, shortly before the incident, Orlando Harris parked his blue 2012 Dodge Avenger near the building before entering the school via a side entryway, walking up to the third floor. Harris was armed with an AR-15 style rifle, more than 600 rounds of ammunition, and about a dozen 30-round magazines.

At 9:02 a.m., Harris parked his car on Arsenal Street. Minutes later, he exited the vehicle and walked downstairs to a side door of the school's annex building. Wearing all black clothing, Harris forcibly made entry by shooting the door's bottom glass panel before pushing the crash bar to open the door from the other side. Harris entered the school at 9:08 a.m. As Harris entered the school, an unarmed school security guard noticed him and ran away to warn people. Harris turned and walked towards the school's dance class. Just outside the dance studio, Harris encountered a female student. Harris fired a shot, only to miss the student. Harris continued into the dance class. In the dance class, Harris threatened the students inside and opened fire, fatally wounding 15-year-old Alexzandria Bell. Harris then tried shooting at the other students and the teacher, but the rifle malfunctioned. The occupants inside the dance class escaped as Harris walked away from the dance studio. Harris proceeded upstairs to a breezeway.

Harris entered the school's main building through a side door and entered the first floor. On the first floor, Harris walked into a stairwell on the northeast section of the school. He entered the second floor of the school. Harris walked down the hallway and encountered school staff members standing in the hallway. Moments before, the staff members were having a meeting until they were interrupted by a school security guard alerting everyone about an active shooter. Harris tried shooting at them, only to miss. The staff members ran back to their offices and locked the doors. By that point, the entire school was placed under lockdown. Harris walked to classroom #215 and fired a shot through the door window, hitting no one. Harris turned towards the central hallway and walked to the west hallway. As he entered the west hallway, Harris encountered another security guard. Harris called her a "bitch" before chasing her to a female bathroom. Harris aimed his rifle at the restroom's door only for the rifle to malfunction again. Harris walked north down the west hallway to loop around to the east hallway. Harris turned back to the central hallway and walked upstairs to the third floor.

On the third floor, Harris walked down the hallway where he encountered a student. The student ran away from Harris as Harris chased him. They both reached the stairwell Harris entered the third floor from. The student ran downstairs and escaped. Harris tried running down the stairs, only to fall in the process. Harris quickly got back up and walked back to the third floor's hallway. Behind a pillar of the stairwell, Harris took off his tactical vest. Harris walked north towards classroom #323 and shot open the lock before entering. In classroom #323, Harris shouted at the students and fatally shot the teacher, Jean Kuczka, as she shielded her students. Harris proceeded to fire more rounds inside the classroom, injuring four students. While shooting in the classroom, his rifle repeatedly malfunctioned, causing some students to escape by jumping out of the windows. Harris eventually left the classroom and walked towards the computer lab. Outside the computer lab, Harris waited for police. He also made an obscene gesture at the security camera. Harris eventually entered the computer lab and hid behind a wall in the room, where he would stay for the duration of the shooting. Throughout the shooting, Harris' rifle malfunctioned several times and he repeatedly tried clearing the jams. Harris reloaded at least three times during the course of the shooting.

At 9:11 a.m., police received the first call regarding an active shooter threat at the school. School security officers were credited with identifying Harris's intentions and warning others to allow for authorities to be notified.

One witness said Harris shot the windows of his classroom out, then shouted "You're all going to fucking die" before he attempted to enter their room. At one point, Harris entered a dance class intent on opening fire, but his firearm malfunctioned, allowing occupants to escape. Evacuating students and staff were questioned by responding officers to pinpoint where Harris was located and also followed the sounds of gunfire. Police entered the building at 9:15 a.m., ordered Harris to put his hands up, and subsequently exchanged gunfire with him eight minutes later. After a brief shootout, at 9:25 a.m., Harris was struck and killed in the computer lab. No officers were injured. During the shootout, Harris only fired one round at the officers. His rifle was also damaged by police gunfire.

During the shooting, students attending Collegiate School of Medicine and Bioscience, which shares the building with Central Visual and Performing Arts High School, were placed under lockdown. Students were evacuated to the nearby Gateway STEM High School.

== Victims ==
Two people were killed by the gunman: 15-year-old sophomore Alexzandria Bell, who was pronounced dead on the scene, and 61-year-old physical education teacher Jean Kuczka, who died at a hospital. They were both shot one time each in the torso area. In addition to the fatalities, seven people were injured, four from gunshots and three from physical injuries caused by the ensuing chaos and evacuation. One injured victim was shot twice and jumped out a second-story window, breaking his ankle.

== Investigation ==
St. Louis Police and federal authorities from the FBI and ATF worked together to search both the school, home and car of the perpetrator to identify a motive. The FBI created a digital evidence collection website where they have asked anyone with photos, video, audio or any other evidence to upload it to aid in the investigation.

After the incident, Harris was described by some who knew him in school as often lonely or quiet, but students in his drama classes said he was outgoing and friendly. Harris left a note inside of his car containing a list of school shootings, school shooters, and death tolls of the incidents. In the note, he stated that he wanted to be the “next national school shooter.” He wrote: “I don’t have any friends, I don’t have any family, I’ve never had a girlfriend, I’ve never had a social life. I’ve been an isolated loner my entire life. This was the perfect storm of a mass shooter.” A map of the school was also found in the car, showing the attack had been planned.

== Perpetrator ==
The perpetrator was identified by authorities as Orlando DeShawn Harris (May 16, 2003 – October 24, 2022), a 19-year-old Black male, of Carondelet, St. Louis. Harris had graduated from the school a year prior and had no adult criminal record. Harris struggled with mental health issues. Harris' family sought mental health treatment for Harris and had at times committed Harris to a mental institution.

On October 8, 2022, Harris attempted to purchase a weapon from a licensed dealer in St. Charles, Missouri, but was denied because of a failed FBI background check. Harris then purchased the AR-15 style rifle used in the shooting from a private individual. No law prevented the private sale.

On October 15, Harris' mother called 9-1-1 to report that Harris had the rifle and requested that police remove the rifle. Responding police determined Harris was lawfully allowed to possess the rifle. Police confiscated the rifle from Harris and handed it to an adult who was lawfully permitted to carry it.

Harris left behind a notebook and many handwritten notes. In one, he detailed that his plan was to kill at least thirty before committing suicide or being killed by police. Another contains a list of previous mass shooters with high body counts. He also had a list of five people he intended to target, all teachers, although none of his victims were on this list.

== Reactions ==
The White House called it "another school shooting," stated "our hearts go out to everyone impacted by this senseless violence," and renewed calls for an assault weapons ban. President Joe Biden posted on Twitter, writing "Jill and I are thinking of everyone impacted by the senseless shooting in St. Louis – especially those killed and injured, their families, and the first responders. As we mourn with Central Visual and Performing Arts, we must take action – starting by banning assault weapons." United States Secretary of Education Miguel Cardona condemned the shooting, calling it a "senseless act of violence".

St. Louis Mayor Tishaura Jones called the event "a devastating and traumatic situation", tweeting "Help us Jesus" following the shooting. On October 27, the area held a Gun Violence and School Safety town hall at the St. Louis Community College which was hosted by Representative Cori Bush, St. Louis Mayor Tishaura Jones and St. Louis Public Safety Director Daniel Isom, with some participation seen by Congressman Jamaal Bowman who serves as Vice Chair on the U.S. House Committee on Education and Labor.

The St. Louis Blues would hold two moments of silence, the first being in Winnipeg during their game against the Winnipeg Jets, and the second one during their home game against the Edmonton Oilers. As a result of the shooting, the school and its neighboring Collegiate School of Medicine and Bioscience were closed for a week.

The editorial board of The Washington Post wrote that Missouri is "notorious for having some of the weakest gun laws in the nation" and asked, "How many more school shootings need to happen before Missouri wakes up? How many more before Congress enacts a national assault weapons ban and requires universal background checks?" An opinion piece at The Philadelphia Inquirer contrasted law enforcement responses to this shooting, with that of Robb Elementary School shooting in Uvalde, Texas, the latter having widely been perceived as inept.

== See also ==
- List of school shootings in the United States by death toll
- List of mass shootings in the United States in 2022
- 2022 Oakland school shooting
