= Collegiate School of Medicine and Bioscience =

Magnet high school in St. Louis

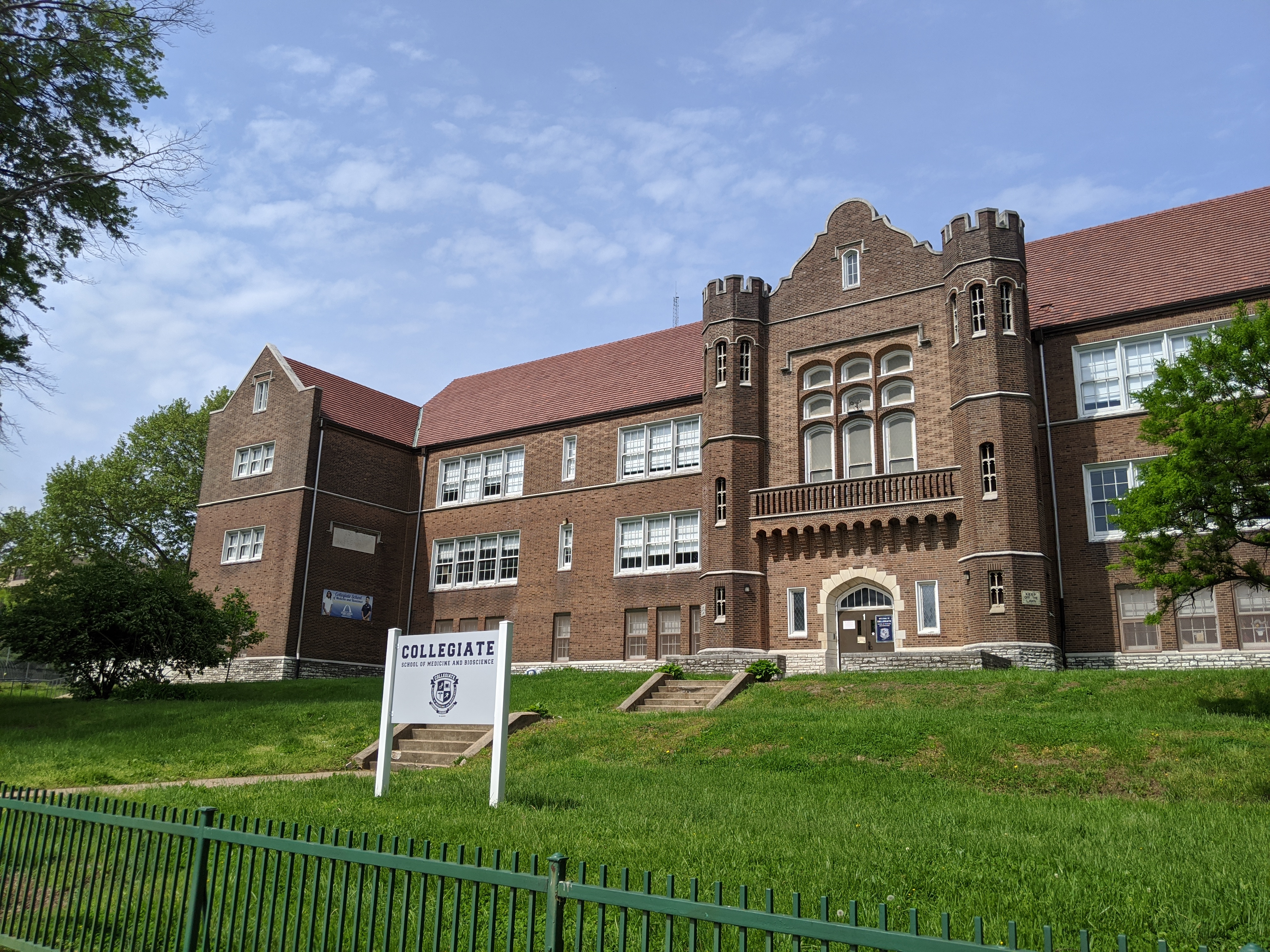
- Collegiate's former location

Location
- 4939 Kemper Avenue; St. Louis, Missouri 63139; United States; 38.619012°N 90.237119°W

Information
- Type: Magnet high school
- Established: 2013; 13 years ago
- School district: St. Louis Public Schools
- NCES School ID: 292928003231
- Principal: Frederick Steele
- Teaching staff: 21.00 (on an FTE basis)
- Grades: 9–12
- Enrollment: 334 (2022-2023)
- Student to teacher ratio: 15.90
- Colors: White, navy, and gray
- Mascot: Owl
- Nickname: Hootie
- Website: slps.org/collegiate

The Collegiate School of Medicine and Bioscience is a magnet high school in St. Louis, Missouri. It was established in 2013 and is part of the St. Louis Public Schools district.

== History ==
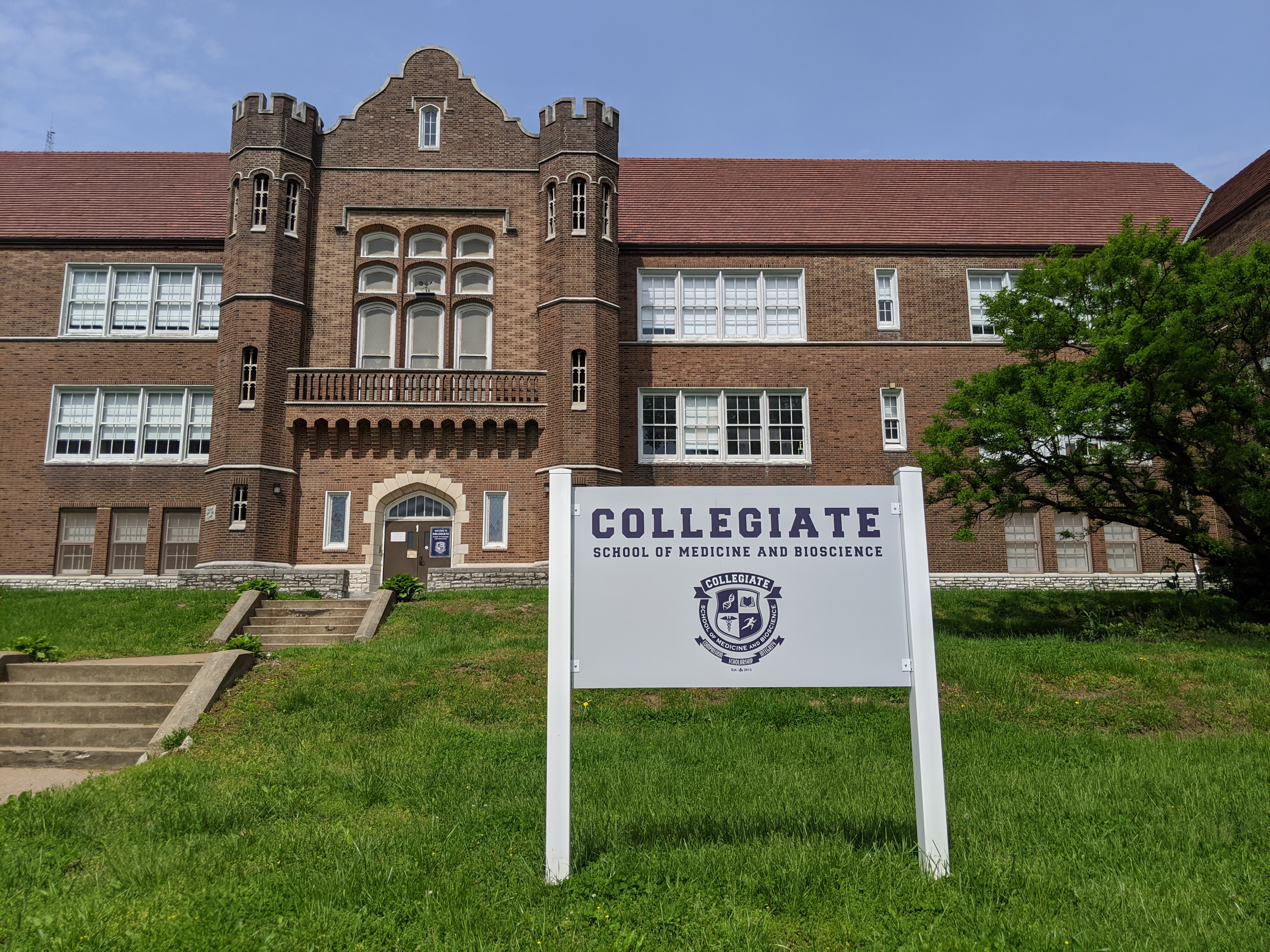
Collegiate School of Medicine and Bioscience in 2020.

In 2013, SLPS set up the school after demand for a magnet high school oriented towards medical professions was raised by community members. The school's funding came from an advisory board of 14 members, most of whom were executives from major industries in the Greater St. Louis area. The board pushed to move the school into its current location in The Gate District neighborhood within the St. Louis University Medical District. The board has paid for multiple fees of its students such as bus passes, college application fees, PSAT fees, and money for field trips for its students. The board has also secured internships for its students from a variety of companies and businesses in St. Louis such as St. Louis University, St. Louis Zoo, Barnes-Jewish Hospital, and Danforth Plant Science Center. Collegiate is currently trying to raise $13 million to create a science wing with 6 laboratories, a greenhouse, and a gymnasium. Most science classes were held in mobile labs behind the school.

In 2021, the school proposed moving its location to Cleveland Junior Naval Academy, which the St. Louis Public Schools board voted to close effective the upcoming school year. The proposal did not come without pushback from students, who created a petition signed by around 460 individuals to keep the school at its current location. Despite the opposition, Collegiate moved forward with the move and relocated to Cleveland Junior Naval Academy's former location.

On October 24, 2022, a school shooting took place at Central Visual and Performing Arts, which shares a campus with Collegiate. Two victims were killed during this shooting.

== Academics ==
The school requires all of its students do 100 hours of community service. First aid and CPR certification is also required before entering the 11th grade. All seniors must complete an internship or capstone project in a bioscience field before graduating. Its auditorium regularly hosts guest speakers from nearby Washington University in St. Louis and Saint Louis University. The average ACT score is 25 and the average SAT is 1210. The student teacher ratio is 15 to 1. 92% of its student body is proficient in reading and 72% of the students are proficient in math. All 44 seniors of the school's first graduating class went to university and the school continues to rival other magnet schools such as McKinley Classical Leadership Academy and Metro Academic and Classical High School, often ranked among the top schools in the nation.

== Athletics ==
Collegiate has expanded its athletics and has recorded success. The following sports are currently being offered: basketball (boys/girls), volleyball (boys/girls), soccer(boys/girls), track & field, cross country, and tennis (boys/girls).

== Awards ==
In 2018, Collegiate won first place in a World Wide Technology Hack-A-Thon contest.

In 2025, U.S. News & World Report has ranked Collegiate as the #1 Public School in the state of Missouri.

https://www.usnews.com/education/best-high-schools/missouri
