= Gravois Park, St. Louis =

Neighborhood of St. Louis in Missouri, US

Coordinates: 38.5909°N 90.2353°W

Gravois Park
- Neighborhood of St. Louis
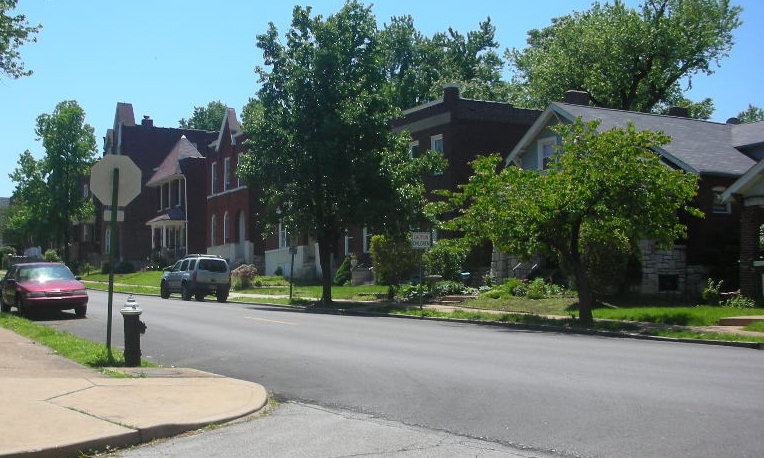
- Homes across from Gravois Park in the neighborhood of the same name.

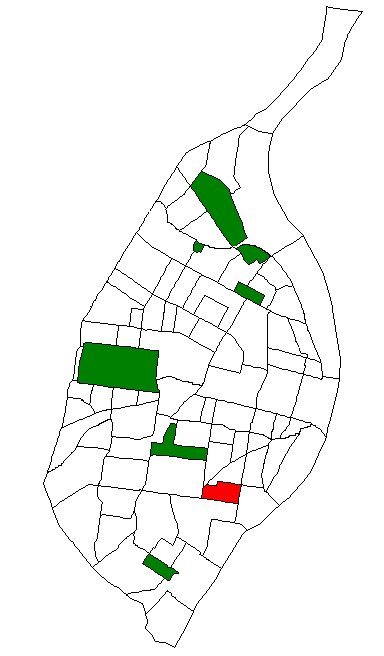
- Location (red) of Gravois Park within St. Louis
- Country: United States
- State: Missouri
- City: St. Louis
- Wards: 3, 7

Government
  - Aldermen: Shane Cohn, Alisha Sonnier

Area
  - Total: 0.44 sq mi (1.1 km^{2})

Population (2020)
  - Total: 4,683
  - Density: 11,000/sq mi (4,100/km^{2})
- ZIP code(s): Parts of 63118
- Area code(s): 314

Gravois Park is a historic neighborhood of St. Louis, Missouri. Roughly bounded by Jefferson Avenue, Chippewa Street, Grand Boulevard, and Cherokee Street, the Gravois Park neighborhood is a diverse mix of homeowners, renters, and businesses. The area's architecture reflects its settlement at the turn of the 20th century. The namesake park dates from 1812 (a grant made by the US government), and was praised for its beauty in the nineteenth century already, and in 1914 was part of a walking tour of the city meant to show off the City Plan Commission's "idealized view of the shape of the city."

== Demographics ==
Historical population
Census	Pop.	Note	%±
1990	5,183		—
2000	5,826		12.4%
2010	5,225		−10.3%
2020	4,683		−10.4%

In 2020 the Gravois Park's racial makeup was 60.7% Black, 20.6% White, 0.5% Native American, 2.7% Asian, 8.0% Two Or More Races, and 7.5% Some Other Race. 10.9% of the population was of Hispanic or Latino origin.

As of the 2010 census, Gravois Park is the densest neighborhood in the city of St. Louis at 11,929 residents per square mile

== See also ==
- Dutchtown, the German-American settled neighborhood to the south of Gravois Park
