= Stillman Rouse =

American football player (1917–1997)

No. 35, 73
- Position: End

Personal information
- Born: September 22, 1917; St. Louis, Missouri, U.S.
- Died: December 22, 1997 (aged 80); Bethesda, Maryland, U.S.
- Listed height: 6 ft 2 in (1.88 m)
- Listed weight: 205 lb (93 kg)

Career information
- High school: McKinley (MO)
- College: Missouri
- NFL draft: 1940: 15th round, 136th overall pick

Career history
- Detroit Lions (1940); Richmond Rebels (1948)

Career NFL statistics
- Receptions: 2
- Receiving yards: 17
- Stats at Pro Football Reference

Stillman Ivan Rouse (September 22, 1917 – December 22, 1997) was an American professional football player.

Rouse was born in St. Louis in 1917, graduating from that city's McKinley High School. He then played college football at the University of Missouri from 1936 to 1939. As a senior, Rouse and quarterback Paul Christman led the 1939 Missouri Tigers football team to an 8–2 record (including a loss to Georgia Tech in the Orange Bowl), the Big 6 championship, and the No. 6 ranking in the final AP poll. While at Missouri, he also won an intramural heavyweight boxing champion as a sophomore and was a champion chess player.

He also played professional football in the National Football League (NFL) as an end for the Detroit Lions. He appeared in 10 games for the Lions during the 1940 season. He was also employed by Ford Motor Company while playing with the Lions.

Rouse was drafted into the Army in June 1941. At the conclusion of World War II, Rouse returned to professional football, appearing in 10 games in 1946 for the Portsmouth Pirates of the Dixie Football League and two games in 1948 for the Richmond Rebels of the American Football League.

Rouse died in 1997 at Bethesda, Maryland.
