= List of house styles =

This is a list of house styles. It encompasses vernacular and traditional architecture outside of strict academic customs and not limited by single layout, focusing on regional styles and mass-replicated trims used in design of conventional houses.

Name of the style	Image	Location	Years built	Primary material	Description
Cape Dutch		Africa	1600s		
Riad		Africa			
Tata Somba		Africa			
Rumah Gadang		Asia			
Sanheyuan		Asia			
Mar del Plata style		South America			
Casa Chorizo		South America			
Bello y Reborati		South America			
Rancho rural		South America			
Sobrado		South America			
Barraca		Southern Europe			
Domus		Southern Europe			
Italianate		United States (invented in United Kingdom)	1800s-present	Various	Neoclassical style inspired by Italian architecture, with most distinctive features being prominent soffits with modillions, and often flat roof. Sometimes accompanied by a tower.
Mediterranean Revival		United States Latin America Australia	1800s-1930s 1990s-present	Various	Broader eclectic movement inspired by Southern European architecture of Spain, Italy, southern France and Greece.
Pueblo style		United States			
Spanish colonial		Southern Europe (Spain); United States; South America			
Georgian		United States, Western Europe (United Kingdom)			
Georgian colonial		United States	1700s-1780s	Timber	The earliest established style of American colonial architecture.
German colonial		United States	1600s	Half-timber	Style of German settlers found in Pennsylvania.
Monterey colonial		United States (California)	1800s	Timber	Rare and early Spanish colonial style, found in California.
Dutch colonial revival		United States		Timber	Style inspired by the building tradition of Dutch colonizers. Has a distinctive Gambrel roof.
Colonial Revival		United States	1880s-1910s	Various	Eclectic style that combines different colonial architecture (Federal, Georgian) and some earlier revival movements. Often white with black shutters.
Greek Revival		United States	1800s-1860s	Timber	Popular type of house trim in North America. Features various decorative elements inspired by ancient Greek architecture, like wide pilasters and entablature. Usually painted white. Sometimes has portico.
Antebellum		United States	1830s-1860s	Various	Eclectic style seen in Deep South states, combines Greek Revival with Georgian.
Neo-eclectic		United States	1990s-present	Various	Contemporary neoclassical style that combines different decor traditions, adjusted for modern production. Gave birth to term McMansion.
Elizabethan		United States			
Jacobean		United Kingdom			
Federal		United States			
Stone ender		United States			
Creole cottage		United States			
French colonial		United States			
Second Empire		United States Canada			
Bay-and-gable		Canada			
Vancouver Special		Canada			
Arcachon villa		France	1860s-1910s	Brick	French variation of Victorian era architecture found in Arcachon region.
Gothic Revival		United States			
Storybook house		United States			
Victorian (United Statesn)		United States			
Victorian terrace (British)		United Kingdom			
American Craftsman		United States			
California bungalow		United States			
Cape Cod		United States		Timber	Usually one-story cottage; low, broad with a steep side-gable roof to which dormers are often added to create a second story (in some locations, referred to as 1.5-story)
Conch house		United States			
Hogan		United States			
Florida cracker architecture		United States			
Flounder house		United States			
Pacific lodge		United States			
Prairie style		United States			
Rustic		United States			
Shingle style		United States			
Stick style		United States			
Ranch		United States			
Haveli		South Asia (India)			
Świdermajer		Poland		Timber	
Art Deco					
International Style		United States			
Mid-century modern		United States			
Streamline Moderne		United States			
Post-modern		United States			
Bedre Byggeskik		Denmark	1910s-1940s	Brick	
Konak		Ottoman Empire			
Mazanka		Ukraine		Clay	
Ontario Cottage		Canada	1800s	Brick	One- or one-and-a-half-story house with a symmetrical rectangular floor plan and a gable centred over the door, popular in small-town.
Dragestil		Norway	1880s-1910s	Timber	Traditional Norwegian "Dragon Style" wooden architecture.
Russian Revival architecture		Russian Empire	1850s-1910s	Timber	Neoclassical style Inspired by traditional Russian wooden architecture, such as Izba and Terem buildings.
Dingbat		United States	1950s-1970s	Stucco	Art-deco era apartment building with garages on the first floor, unique to Los Angeles region.
Filigree		Australia	1790s-1910s	Various	Emerged in hotter northern parts of Australia and characterized by prominent verandahs spanning most of facade's length.
Queenslander		Australia	1840s-1930s	Timber	Wooden house style that originated on East Coast of Australia in 19th century.
Federation		Australia	1890s-1910s	Brick	Style that merges British neoclassical architecture of the time (Queen Anne, Edwardian) with local Australian decor tradition.
Queen Anne		United Kingdom	1700s	Brick	Term used to describe 18th century British manor tradition, usually with tall windows and made of red brick.
Queen Anne Revival (UK)		United Kingdom	1830s-1910s	Brick	19th century interpretation of Queen Anne style with increased decorations, scaled for mass housing. Inspired New World Queen Anne Revival architecture in America and Australia.
Queen Anne (America)		United States	1880s-1910s	Timber	American adaptation of British Queen Anne revival style, reproduced with widely available local materials.
Snickarglädje		Sweden	1840s-1910s	Timber	Swedish name for decorative wooden elements and building style that utilized them in 19th century, mostly used as summer houses (Sommarvilla). Found across Sweden, Finland and Norway.

== See also ==
- List of architectural styles
