= Gate District, St. Louis =

Neighborhood of St. Louis in Missouri, US

Coordinates: 38.6196°N 90.2294°W

The Gate District
- Neighborhood of St. Louis
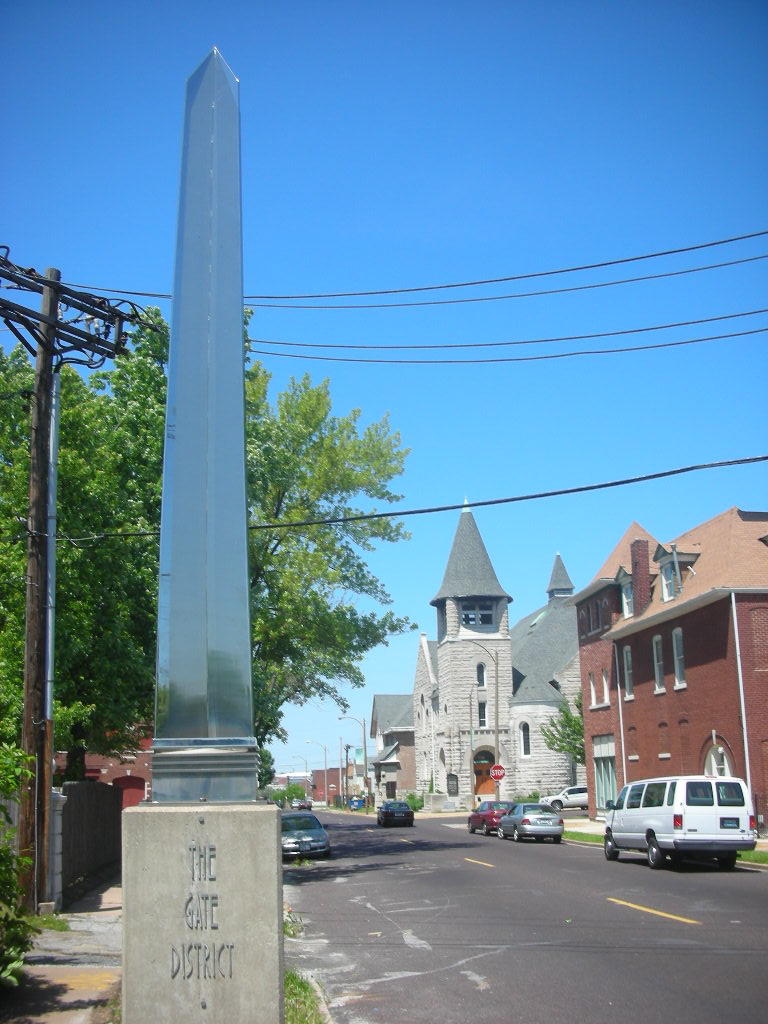
- The entrance to the Gate District on Compton Avenue.

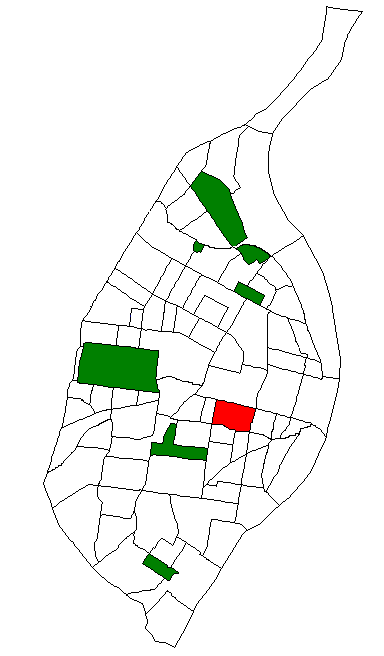
- Location (red) of the Gate District within St. Louis
- Country: United States
- State: Missouri
- City: St. Louis
- Wards: 7

Government
  - Aldermen: Alisha Sonnier

Area
  - Total: 0.65 sq mi (1.7 km^{2})

Population (2020)
  - Total: 3,419
  - Density: 5,300/sq mi (2,000/km^{2})
- ZIP code(s): Part of 63104
- Area code(s): 314
- Website: stlouis-mo.gov

The Gate District is a neighborhood of St. Louis, Missouri. The Gate District is defined as the area between Chouteau Avenue and Interstate 44 on the north and south and between South Jefferson Avenue and South Grand Boulevard on the east and west. This area is just south of the central corridor and west of Lafayette Square. The term Gate was added to define this neighborhood due to the number of ironclad gates lining the streets. Today, the neighborhood is the subject of increased gentrification.

== Demographics ==
In 2020 The Gate District's racial makeup was 72.5% Black, 19.2% White, 0.1% Native American, 1.9% Asian, 5.1% Two or More Races, and 1.1% Some Other Race. 3.0% of the population was of Hispanic or Latino origin.

Historical population
Year	Pop.	±%
1990	3,403	—
2000	3,491	+2.6%
2010	3,456	−1.0%
2020	3,419	−1.1%

Racial composition	2000	2010	2020
White	10.1%	14.4%	19.2%
Black or African American	86.7%	82.0%	72.5%
Hispanic or Latino (of any race)	1.1%	1.1%	3.0%
Asian	0.5%	1.3%	1.9%

Household & Housing Households: ~1,616, average 2 people per household

Family households: ~677 (41.9%)

Non-family households: ~939 (58.1%) Point2

Housing units: ~1,761, with occupancy rates above 90% City of St. Louis, MO

Income & Education Median household income: ~$68,764–$89,198 depending on source

Education: Higher than national averages — 22% with master’s degrees, 24% with bachelor’s degrees, 32% with some college, and 14% with high school diplomas

== Neighborhood Parks ==
The Gate District is subdivided into four neighborhoods:

- Buder Park: https://www.stlouis-mo.gov/government/departments/parks/parks/browse-parks/view-park.cfm?parkID=19&parkName=Buder+Playground
- Eads Park: https://www.stlouis-mo.gov/government/departments/parks/parks/browse-parks/view-park.cfm?parkID=35&parkName=Eads+Square+Park
- Terry Park: https://www.stlouis-mo.gov/government/departments/parks/parks/browse-parks/view-park.cfm?parkID=86&parkName=Terry+Park
- St. Vincent

== Public Library ==
Barr Branch:https://www.slpl.org/ https://www.google.com/maps/place/St.+Louis+Public+Library+-+Barr+Library/@38.6146846,-90.2216846,3a,75y,126.53h,90t/data=!3m7!1e1!3m5!1swNdLK-

== Fire Station Number 7 ==
2600 LaSalle Street, 63104, in The Gate District https://www.stlouis-mo.gov/government/departments/public-safety/fire/firehouse-locations.cfm

== University ==
St Louis university Medical School: https://www.slu.edu/medicine/index.php

Center for advanced Dental education: https://www.slu.edu/cade/index.php

== Florist ROW ==
https://www.ksdk.com/article/news/local/st-louis-florist-row-lasalle-street-valentines-day/63-1c07a298-eb62-4d81-b0ff-156f50fec9ce

- Walter Knoll
- Baisch & Skinner
- Verdtech
- Belli Fiori
- Floral Supply Syndicate
- Harld's Wholesale florist
