= McKinley Heights, St. Louis =

Neighborhood of St. Louis in Missouri, US

Coordinates: 38.6098°N 90.2183°W

McKinley Heights
- Neighborhood of St. Louis
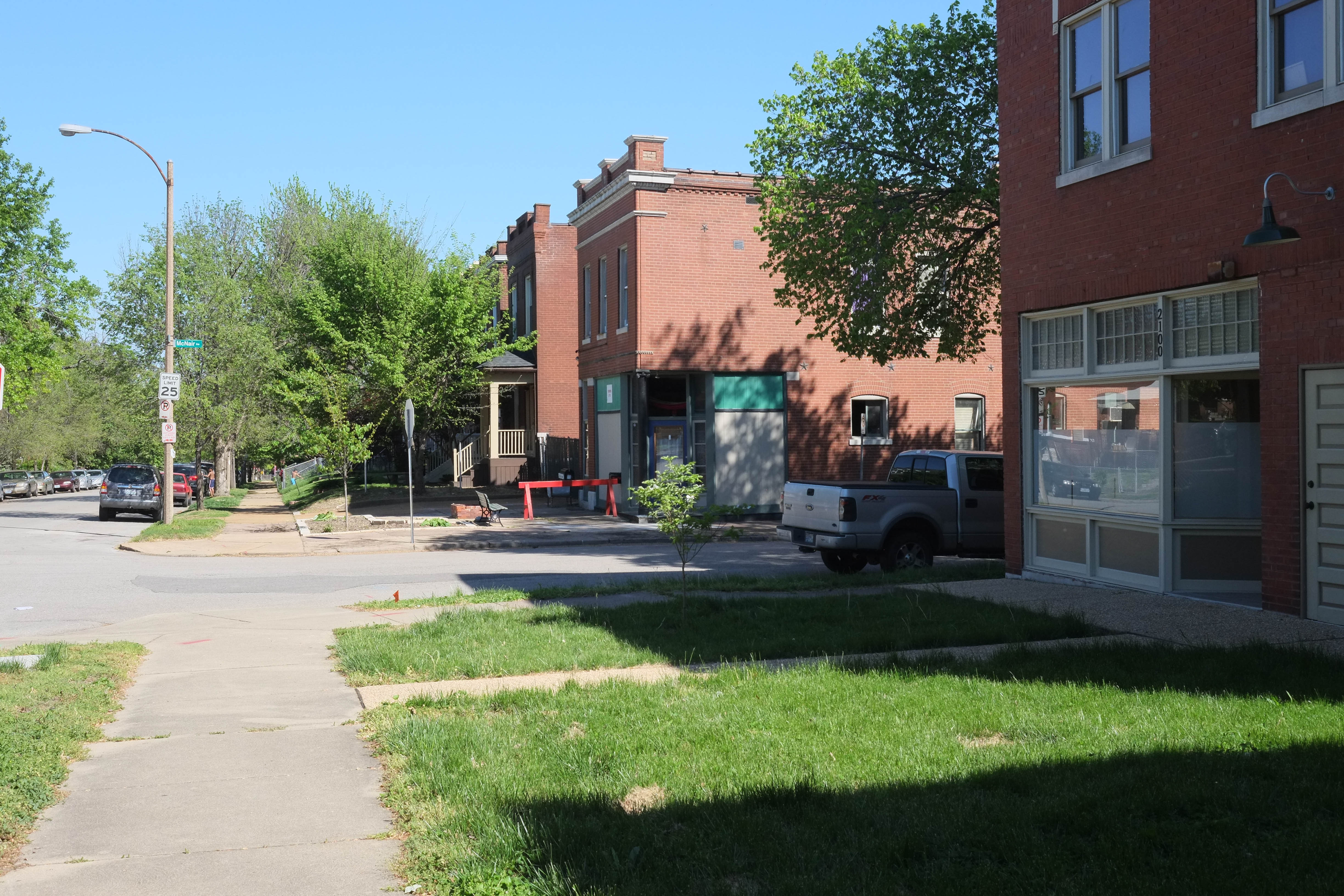
- McKinley Heights, April 2017

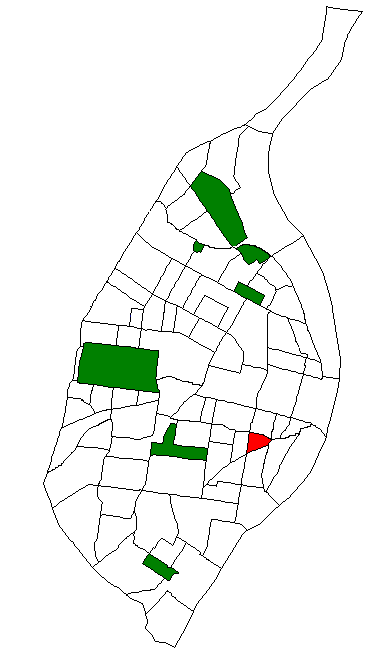
- Location (red) of McKinley Heights within St. Louis
- Country: United States
- State: Missouri
- City: St. Louis
- Wards: 8

Government
  - Aldermen: Jami Cox Antwi

Area
  - Total: 0.22 sq mi (0.57 km^{2})

Population (2020)
  - Total: 1,668
  - Density: 7,600/sq mi (2,900/km^{2})
- ZIP code(s): Part of 63104
- Area code(s): 314
- Website: stlouis-mo.gov

McKinley Heights is a historic conservation neighborhood located in the near South Side of the City of St. Louis. It was rated as a Top 10 Neighborhood for young adults in the St. Louis metropolitan area. The neighborhood is bounded by I-44 to the north, Jefferson Avenue to the west, and I-55 and Gravois Boulevard to the east and south. There are restaurants and entertainment in the adjacent Soulard and Lafayette Square neighborhoods. Three bus routes provide a commute downtown or throughout the City. There are three churches and several neighborhood businesses. There is also 1 6th-12th Grade High School, McKinley Classical Leadership Academy

== Demographics ==
Historical population
Census	Pop.	Note	%±
1990	1,989		—
2000	2,104		5.8%
2010	1,497		−28.8%
2020	1,668		11.4%

In 2020 McKinley Height's racial makeup was 52.3% White, 37.8% Black, 0.1% Native American, 1.5% Asian, 7.8% Two or More Races, and 0.5% Some Other Race. 3.2% of the population was of Hispanic or Latino origin.
