= Benton Park West, St. Louis =

Neighborhood of St. Louis in Missouri, US

Coordinates: 38.5977°N 90.2315°W

Benton Park West
- Neighborhood of St. Louis
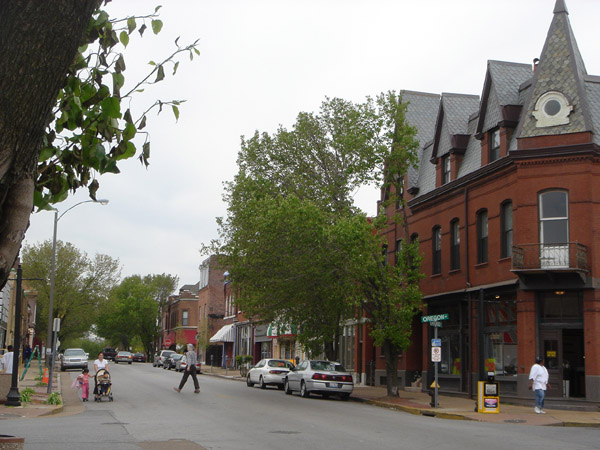
- Cherokee Street

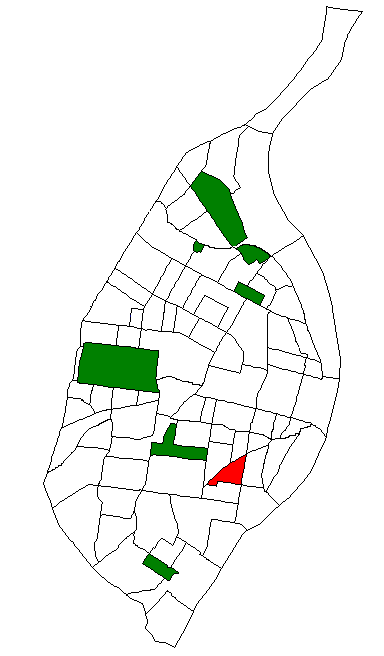
- Location (red) of Benton Park West within St. Louis
- Country: United States
- State: Missouri
- City: St. Louis
- Ward: 7

Government
  - Alderperson: Alisha Sonnier

Area
  - Total: 0.40 sq mi (1.0 km^{2})

Population (2020)
  - Total: 4,238
  - Density: 11,000/sq mi (4,100/km^{2})
- ZIP code(s): Part of 63118
- Area code(s): 314
- Website: stlouis-mo.gov

Benton Park West is a neighborhood located in South St. Louis City, Missouri, United States. The neighborhood is bounded by Jefferson Ave. on the east, Gravois Ave. (MO Route 30) on the north and west, and an irregular boundary consisting of Cherokee Street, S. Compton Ave., and Potomac St. to the south. The neighborhood is the conglomeration of two different neighborhoods in the 1970s, Compton Hill and Marquette-Cherokee. Parts of these two 1970s neighborhoods make up the current day Benton Park West. Marquette-Cherokee was bounded by Arsenal Street on the north, Bates Street on the south and Grand Boulevard on the west. Its eastern edge was the bank of the Mississippi River. Benton Park West has the highest percentage of Latino residents among St. Louis neighborhoods.

In 2005 Benton Park West was added to the National Register of Historic Places as part of the Gravois-Jefferson Streetcar Suburb National Historic District.

== Demographics ==
In 2020 Benton Park West's racial makeup was 50.0% Black, 31.7% White, 1.9% Asian, 8.2% Two or More Races, and 7.7% Some Other Race. 13.2% of the neighborhood's population was of Hispanic or Latino origin.

| Racial Composition | 2000 | 2010 | 2020 |
|---|---|---|---|
| White | 30.4% | 28.0% | 31.7% |
| Black or African American | 59.1% | 59.6% | 50.0% |
| Hispanic or Latino (of any race) | 5.1% | 10.5% | 13.2% |
| Asian | 4.8% | 1.9% | 1.9% |
| Two or More Races | 2.9% | 5.2% | 8.2% |

Historical population
| Census | Pop. | Note | %± |
|---|---|---|---|
| 1990 | 5,202 | | — |
| 2000 | 5,428 | | 4.3% |
| 2010 | 4,404 | | −18.9% |
| 2020 | 4,238 | | −3.8% |

== Arts and Culture ==
Benton Park West is home to many local art galleries and stores, most of which are located on Cherokee Street. It has a large concentration of Hispanic-owned restaurants, bakeries, grocery stores, and other retail. Benton Park West is a diverse community.

There are numerous street festivals held along Cherokee Street. Cinco de Mayo: A Cherokee Street Festival is one of the largest. Organized by Cherokee Street Development League, the Cinco de Mayo festival hosts three stages of musics, food and beverage vendors along the street, and other activities. The People's Joy Parade is also a part of the Cinco de Mayo festival and is organized by C.A.M.P. IndiHop is a partnership between Cherokee Street and the Grove. It's independent neighborhoods celebrating independent breweries. Guests taste independent beers in various locations traveling between the neighborhoods.

The Mexican Independence Day celebration, Fiestaas Patrias STL, is held in September. Originally the festival was owned and managed by the Cherokee Street Latino Business Association, but was sold to Latinos in Axion STL who now manages the annual festival.

== See also ==
- Neighborhoods of St. Louis
- Benton Park West Neighborhood Association
- Cherokee Street News
