= JeffVanderLou, St. Louis =

Neighborhood of St. Louis in Missouri, US

Coordinates: 38.6509°N 90.2208°W

JeffVanderLou
- Neighborhood of St. Louis
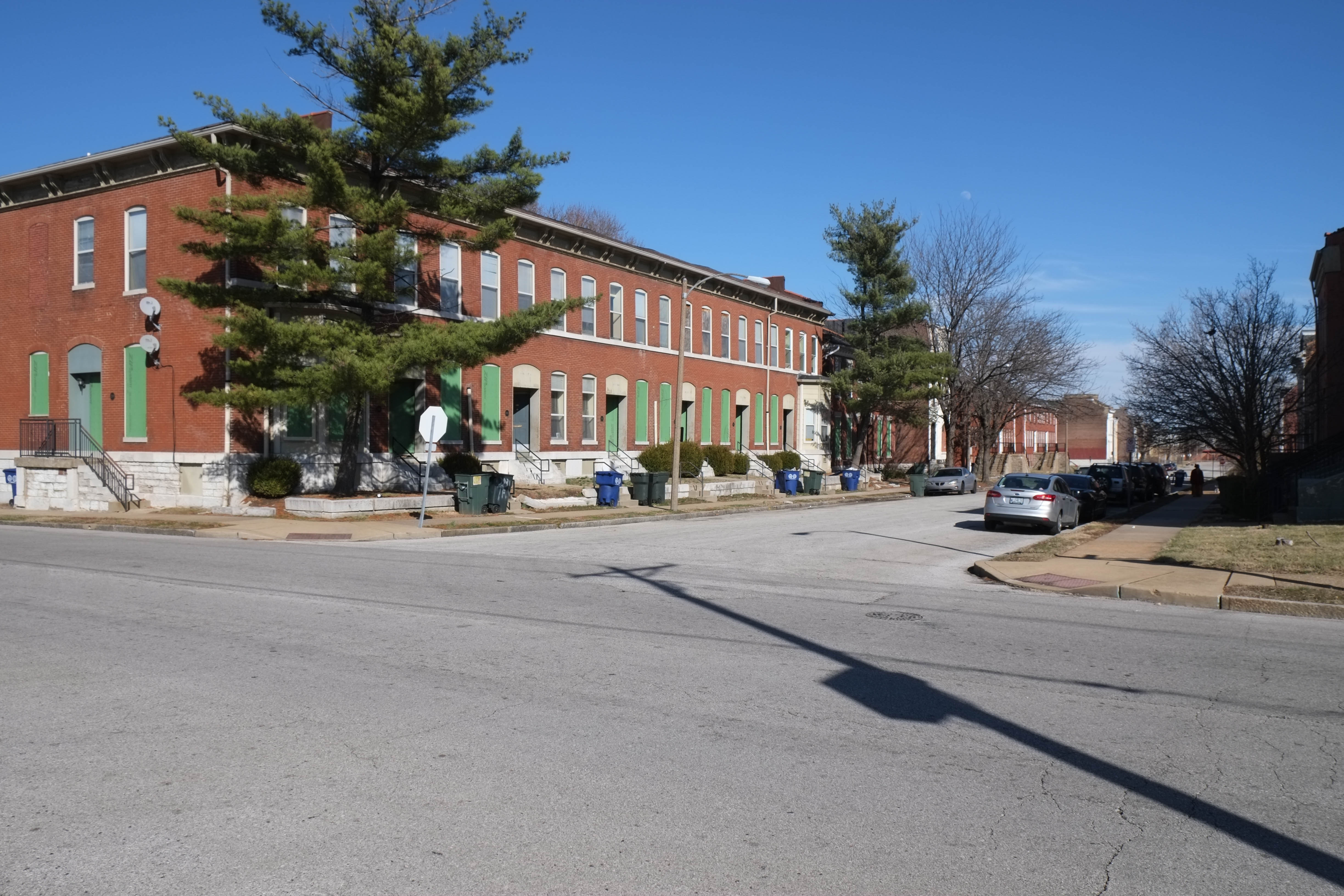
- Rowhouses in JeffVanderLou, February 2018

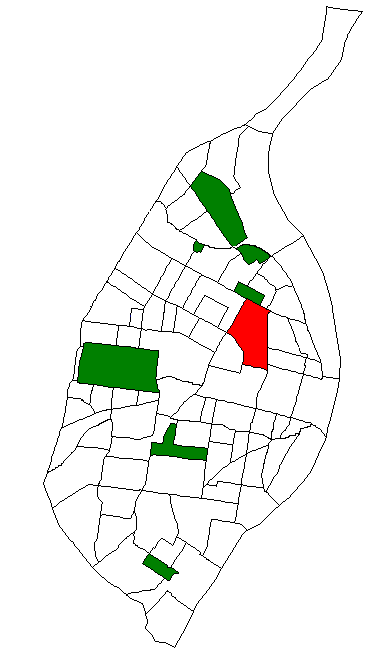
- Location (red) of JeffVanderLou within St. Louis
- Country: United States
- State: Missouri
- City: St. Louis
- Ward: 11, 14

Government
  - Alderman: Laura Keys, Rasheen Aldridge

Area
  - Total: 1.25 sq mi (3.2 km^{2})

Population (2020)
  - Total: 4,209
  - Density: 3,370/sq mi (1,300/km^{2})
- ZIP code(s): Parts of 63106, 63107, 63113
- Area code(s): 314
- Website: stlouis-mo.gov

JeffVanderLou (JVL) is a neighborhood of St. Louis, Missouri. The neighborhood is situated between North Vandeventer Avenue on the northwest, Natural Bridge Avenue on the northeast, North Jefferson Avenue on the East, Delmar Boulevard on the south, and North Compton Avenue and Martin Luther King Drive on the Southwest.

In a time of racial segregation following the end of slavery, JeffVanderLou was originally designated as the city's "Negro District" and was one of the only places where African Americans were allowed to own land.

It is also where Sportsman's Park (later known as Busch Stadium I) stood from 1902 until 1966.

== Demographics ==
In 2020, JeffVanderLou's racial makeup was 92.3% black, 2.9% white, 0.5% Native American, 0.2% Asian, 3.6% two or more races, and 0.5% some other race. 1.5% of the population was of Hispanic or Latino origin.

Historical population
Year	Pop.	±%
1990	8,177	—
2000	6,459	−21.0%
2010	5,557	−14.0%
2020	4,209	−24.3%

== See also ==
- Grand Boulevard (St. Louis)
