= McKinley Classical Leadership Academy =

Magnet high school in St. Louis, Missouri, USA

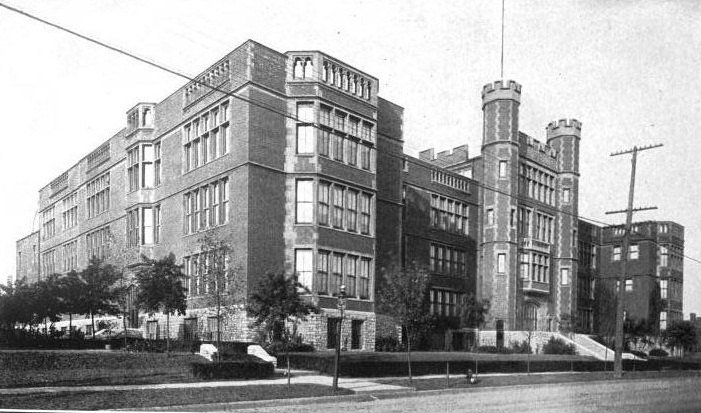
- McKinley High School in 1910

Location
- 2156 Russell Street; St. Louis, Missouri 63104; United States; 38°36′36″N 90°13′12″W

Information
- Type: Magnet school
- Established: 1904; 122 years ago
- School district: St. Louis Public Schools
- Superintendent: Millicent Borishade
- Principal: La’Ron Haymore
- Teaching staff: 40.00 (on an FTE basis)
- Grades: 6–12
- Enrollment: 559 (2022–23)
- Student to teacher ratio: 13.98
- Campus type: Urban
- Colors: Black and gold
- Athletics conference: Public High League
- Mascot: Goldbug
- Website: mckinley.slps.org

McKinley Classical Leadership Academy (also known as McKinley High School or McKinley CLA) is a magnet middle and high school for gifted and talented students in St. Louis, Missouri. It is part of the St. Louis Public Schools district. McKinley opened in 1904 as the first comprehensive public high school in south St. Louis and closed in 1988. The school has been operating as a magnet middle school since the 1990s. It reopened as a high school in 2007. It graduated nine students in May 2011.

== Notable alumni ==
- "Classy" Freddy Blassie - WWE Hall of Fame attended while the school was a public high school
- Jim Kekeris – NFL player, attended while the school was a public high school
- Stillman Rouse – NFL player, attended while the school was a public high school
- Jo Jo White – Naismith Memorial Basketball Hall of Famer, attended while the school was a public high school
