= Private place =

Self-governing housing development in St. Louis, Missouri

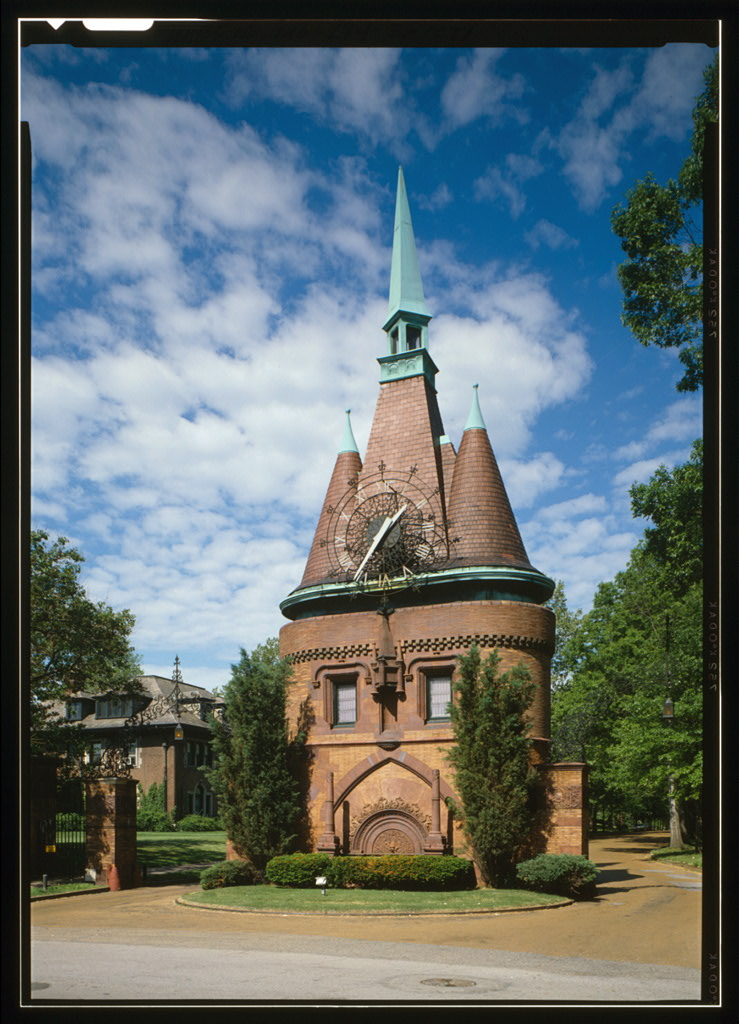
Gate at Washington Terrace, St. Louis, 1892

A private place is a self-governing enclave whose common areas (e.g. streets) are owned by the residents, and whose services are provided by the private sector.

The history of St. Louis, Missouri, and its near suburbs is significant in the development of private places. Most were laid out by Prussian-born surveyor and planner Julius Pitzman, who conceived the idea around 1868 as a way for residential landowners to control real estate speculation and maintain property standards, in an era before the protections of zoning. Pitzman designed 47 of these developments over a 50-year period.

The first of these, Lucas Place, dates from 1851 and no longer exists as such. But the growth of these developments began in earnest with Benton Place, in 1868, a 12-house development adjacent to Lafayette Square, St. Louis, and is in more-or-less original condition today. Vandeventer Place, opened in 1870 and included a house design by H.H. Richardson. Vandeventer Place has been replaced by urban development, with the exception of the east gate, which was removed to Forest Park.

In the 1920s, the idea was extended west into the county, particularly Ladue, by developers such as Meier and Comfort.

These privately controlled single-family housing communities in the midst of the city are legally organized somewhat similarly to condominiums, co-ops or homeowners associations. In 1982, the St. Louis metropolitan area had more than 427 street associations administering private places. Although often associated with high-end communities, neighborhoods of various socio-economic natures have been structured as private places.

== Private places in the City of St. Louis ==
- Clifton Heights (1885)
- Westmoreland Place and adjacent Portland Place (1888) - Portland gates designed by Theodore Link
- Compton Heights (1889)
- Lewis Place (1890)
- Washington Terrace (1892)
- Hortense Place (1900)
- Kingsbury Place (1902) - the gates #3, #7, and #11, designed by Thomas P. Barnett
- Lenox Place (1903)
- Parkview Place (1905), Pitzman's final development
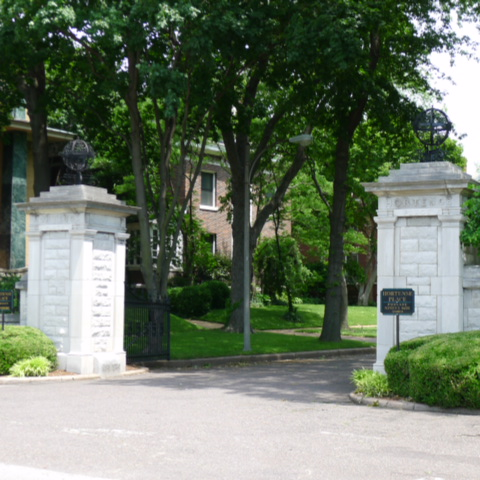
Hortense Place

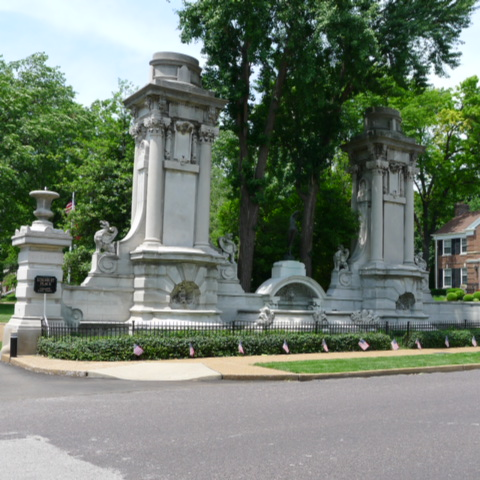
Kingsbury Place

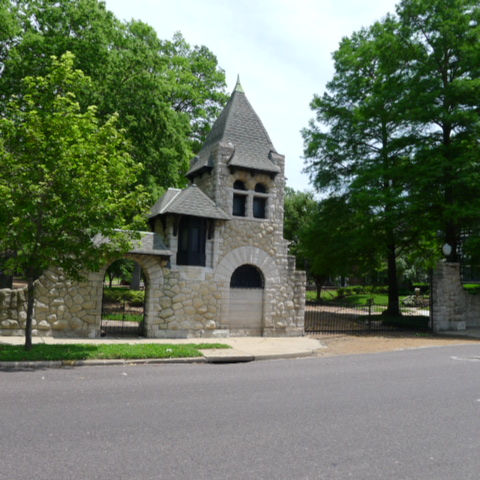
Portland Place

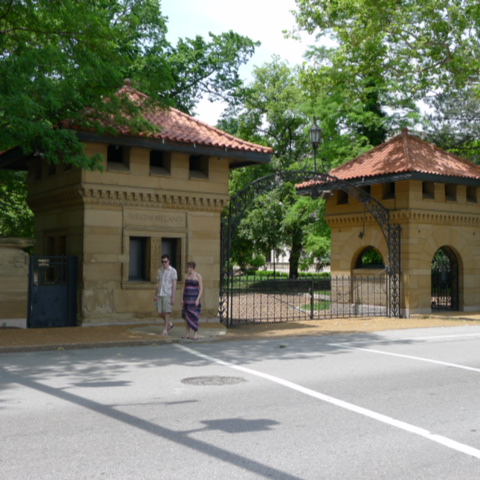
Westmoreland Place

== Private places in St. Louis County ==
- Brentmoor Park (Clayton)
- Carrswold (Clayton)
- Lake Forest (Richmond Heights)
- Hampton Park (Richmond Heights)
- Scarsdale (Richmond Heights)
- Fair Oaks (Ladue)
- Dromara (Ladue)
- La Hacienda (Ladue)
- Briarcliff (Ladue)
- Picardy Lane (Ladue)
- Chevy Chase (Olivette)
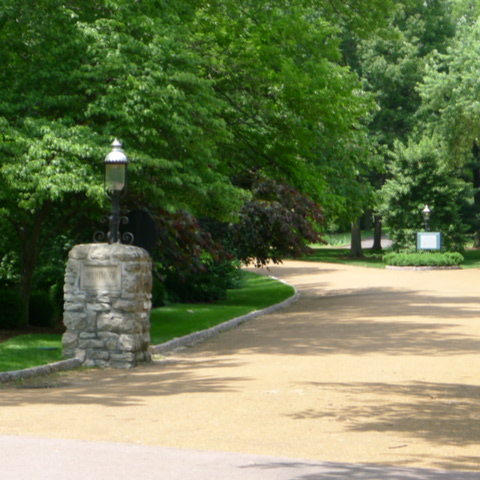
Brentmoor Park

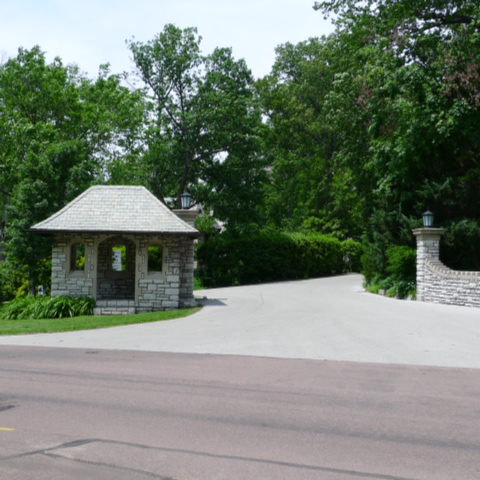
Carrswold

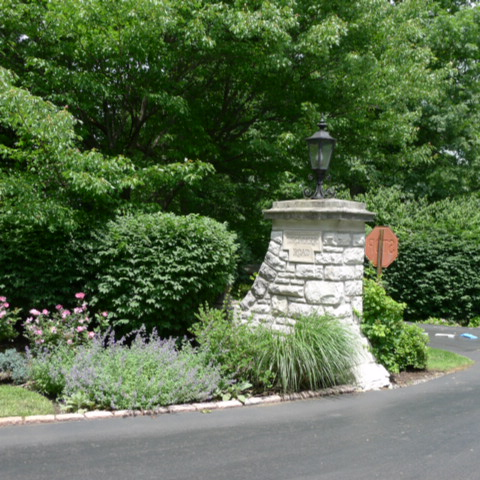
Dromara

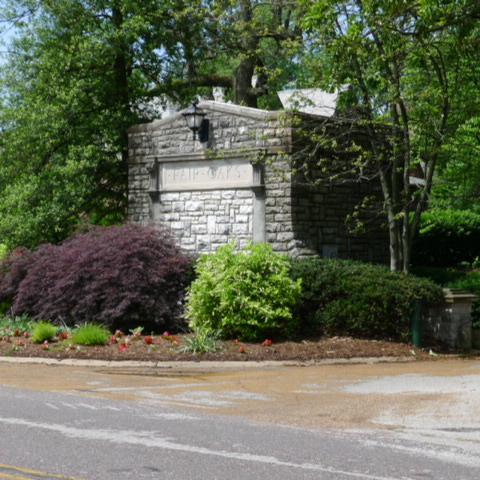
Fair Oaks
