= Kingsbury Place =

Coordinates: 38°39′02″N 90°16′42″W

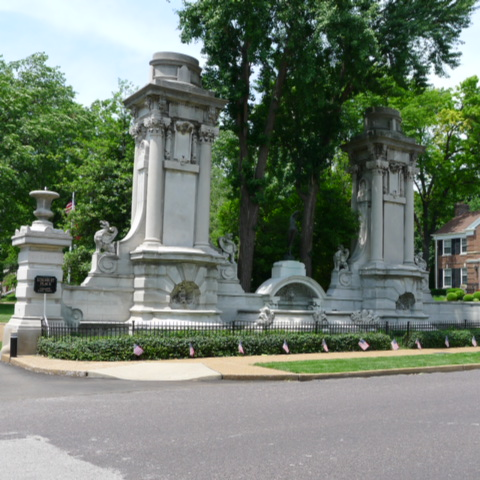
The Gates of Kingsbury Place

Kingsbury Place is a private place neighborhood in St. Louis, Missouri that was founded in 1902.

The land had been surveyed by Julius Pitzman, surveyor and planner, who had been the Chief Engineer for Forest Park and who was considered "the father of the private place" in the United States. Pitzman built his own house at #6 Kingsbury Place.

The beaux-arts entry gates, #3, #7, and #11 were designed by Thomas P. Barnett of Barnett, Haynes & Barnett. Awakening of Spring the naked woman bronze on Union gate is by Clare Pfeifer Garrett.

The neighborhood was designated a City Landmark by the City of St. Louis in 1973.

In the 1970s, the neighborhood became the subject of a lawsuit when the owner of 4 Kingsbury Place died and her will directed her executor to raze the home, sell the lot, and transfer the proceeds to the residuary of the estate. Her neighbors sued to prevent the demolition, asserting that demolition of the home would be a private nuisance, lower their own property values, and violate the terms of a neighborhood covenant. The neighbors ultimately prevailed on appeal.

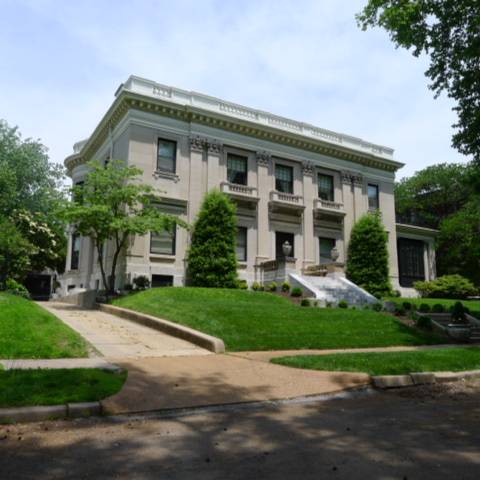
11 Kingsbury Place

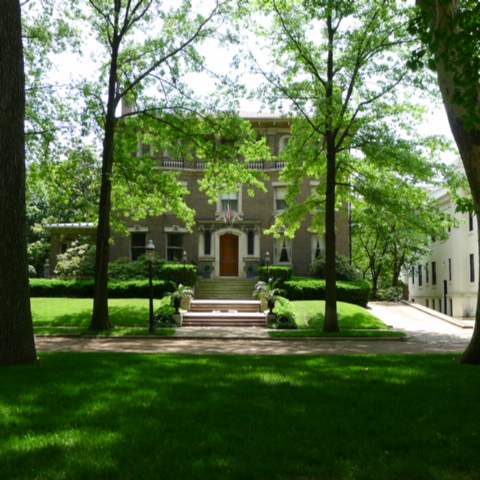
21 Kingsbury Place

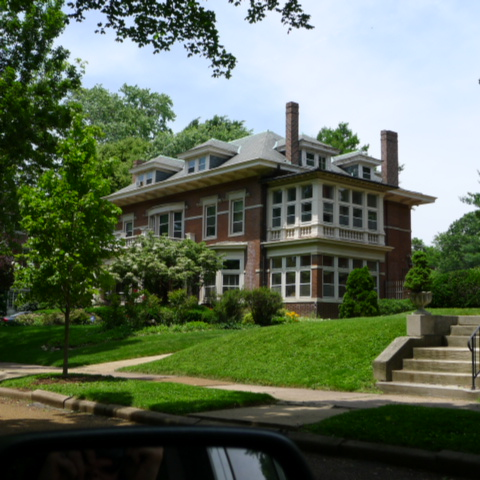
35 Kingsbury Place

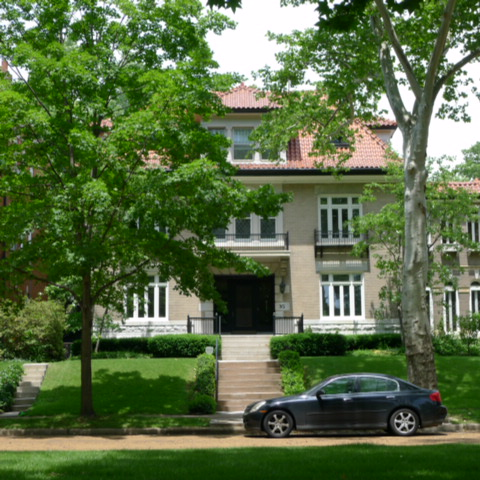
75 Kingsbury Place
