= Southwest Garden, St. Louis =

Neighborhood of St. Louis in Missouri, US

Coordinates: 38.6078°N 90.2735°W

Southwest Garden
- Neighborhood of St. Louis
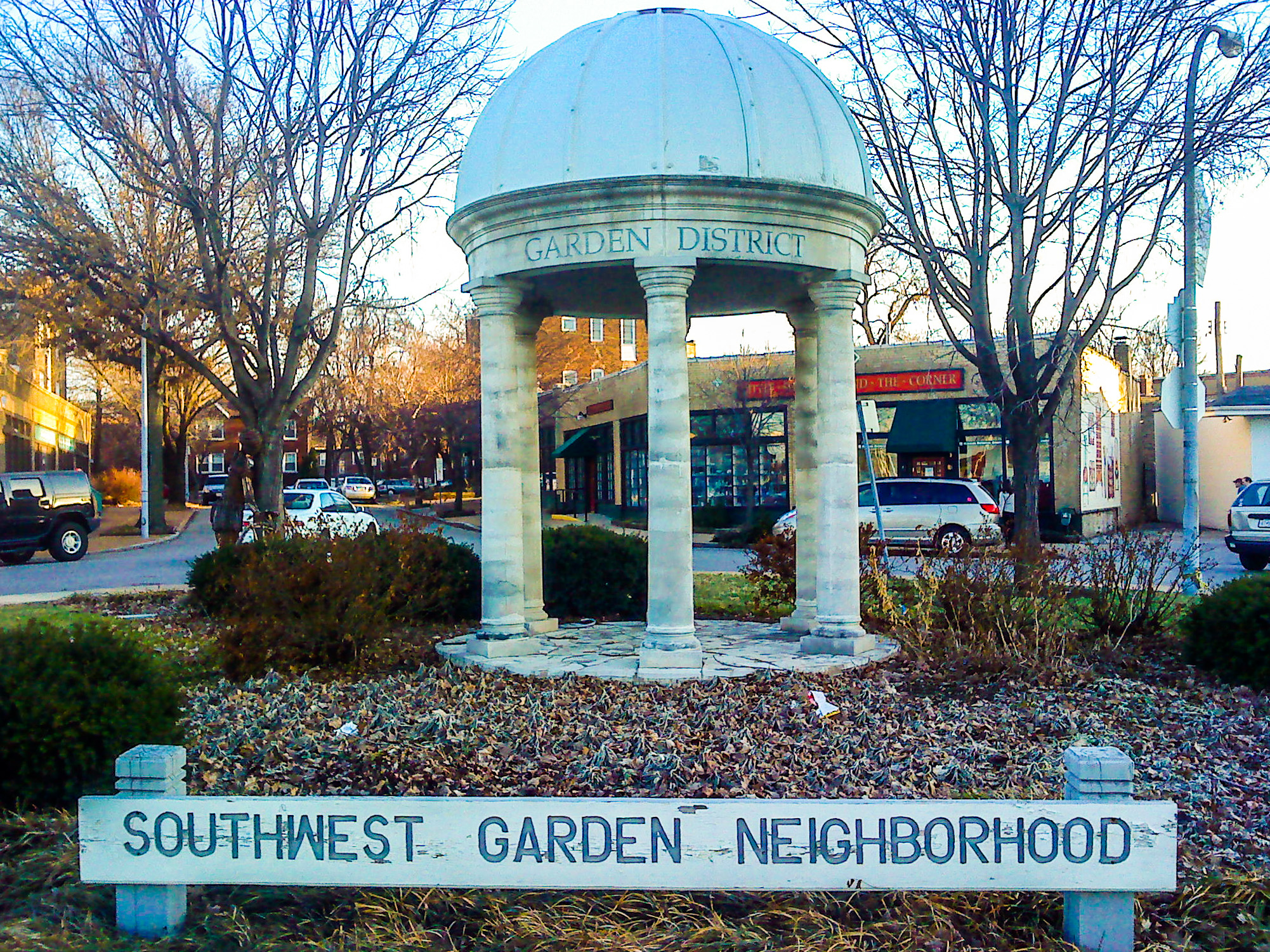
- Southwest Garden Neighborhood sign at the corner of Shaw and Vandeventer Avenue, March 2011

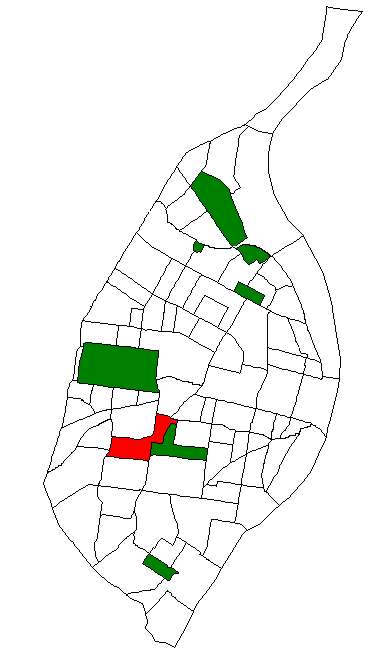
- Location (red) of Southwest Garden within St. Louis
- Country: United States
- State: Missouri
- City: St. Louis
- Ward: 5

Government
  - Aldermen: Matt Devoti

Area
  - Total: 0.86 sq mi (2.2 km^{2})

Population (2020)
  - Total: 5,245
  - Density: 6,100/sq mi (2,400/km^{2})
- ZIP code(s): Parts of 63110, 63139
- Area code(s): 314
- Website: stlouis-mo.gov

Southwest Garden is a neighborhood of St. Louis, Missouri, located south of The Hill and Forest Park Southeast, west of the Missouri Botanical Garden and Tower Grove Park, east of Lindenwood Park and Clifton Heights, and north of North Hampton.

Bisected by Kingshighway Boulevard, one of St. Louis’s major arterial roads, Southwest Garden is named for its proximity to the Botanical Garden. The neighborhood is notable for its architectural heritage, containing two National Historic Landmark Districts:

- Shaw’s Garden, containing the portion of the neighborhood between Kingshighway and the Botanical Garden, covers a tract of land formerly owned by Garden founder Henry Shaw. This area is notable for its highly intact collection of multifamily residential buildings (primarily duplexes and fourplexes) dating to the late 19th and early 20th centuries.
- Reber Place, located directly west of Tower Grove Park, which contains a diverse mix of frame homes, multifamily buildings, and bungalows dating to the late 19th and early 20th centuries.

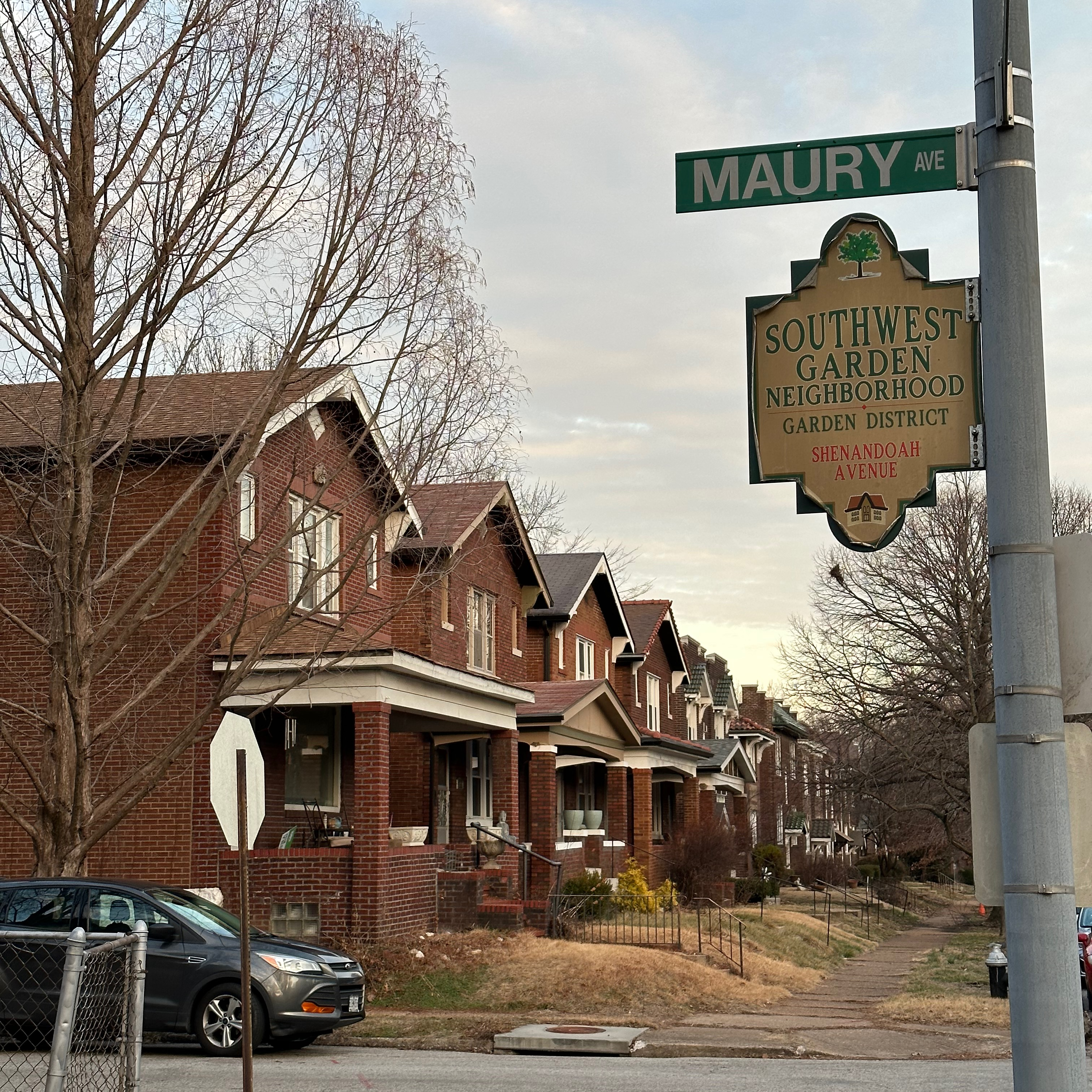
1920s “American Movements”-style duplexes on Shenandoah Avenue in the Shaw’s Garden National Historic Landmark District.

In addition to the Botanical Garden and Tower Grove Park, other notable locations within the neighborhood include:

- The St. Louis Psychiatric Rehabilitation Center, a 196-bed psychiatric hospital operated by the Missouri Department of Mental Health on a 32-acre (13 ha) campus on Arsenal Street in the southern portion of the neighborhood. The campus includes the former St. Louis County Lunatic Asylum, designed by architect William Rumbold and completed in 1869. The Romanesque Revival building is adorned with a prominent 200-foot (61 m) tall cast iron dome. Situated on the highest point in the city, the structure can be seen from up to 30 miles (48 km) away.
- Sublette Park, a neighborhood park including a playground, a pavilion built by the Boy Scouts of America, tennis courts and a soccer field.

== History ==
=== Shaw’s Garden ===
In 1769, Illinois Country French settlers established the first European settlement in modern-day Southwest Garden with the creation of the Prairie des Noyers Commons, a large tract of agricultural land between Grand Avenue and Kingshighway Boulevard. In the 19th century, this communal land on the fringe of a growing St. Louis was gradually sold off to private landowners, including Henry Shaw. Shaw’s holdings came to encompass the modern-day Botanical Garden and most of the land between modern-day Tower Grove Park and Vandeventer Avenue.

Inspired by the gardens of Chatsworth House in England, Shaw created the Missouri Botanical Garden, which opened in 1859, and bequeathed the land for Tower Grove Park to the City of St. Louis in 1868. This spurred the subdivision of several nearby tracts, including Tower Grove Place between Kingshighway and Alfred Avenue in 1870. The “Tower Grove Park Addition” was developed slowly over the following three decades due to poor access to the streetcar system; the nearest line was across Tower Grove Park on Arsenal Street. In 1897, the Missouri Street Railroad Company constructed a new streetcar line to Southampton extending down Vandeventer Avenue and Kingshighway, increasing the viability of residential development in the area.

In the 1910s, under the direction of director George T. Moore and chief landscape architect John Noyes, the Botanical Garden began planning to subdivide its land holdings north and west of its modern boundaries, seeking to establish neighborhoods that would complement the Garden’s aesthetic. The first plat, the “Shaw’s Vandeventer Avenue Addition” north of the Garden (along present-day Interstate 44), was completed in 1916. The Garden generated substantial revenue from selling the land to developers, who constructed a variety of multi-family buildings over the following decade.

The larger trapezoidal tract of land west of the Garden required more substantial planning. Following the subdivision planning principles of renowned landscape architect Henry Wright, Noyes designed a curved street grid that conformed to the tract’s irregular borders. The “Shaw’s Garden Subdivision” was fully developed by third-party builders by the end of the 1920s.

Two private places, Gurney Court and Heger Court, were established by independent developers in the early 1920s along Magnolia Avenue, south of the “Tower Grove Park Addition” and north of Tower Grove Park. These small subdivisions each contain single-family homes centered around a landscaped court.

=== West of Kingshighway ===
Southwest Garden west of Kingshighway has a history similar to its neighbor The Hill. After the "Great Fire" of 1849 destroyed large parts of St. Louis, an ordinance banning frame construction put a premium on brick construction. The demand for brick spurred the mining of clay deposits that had been found west of Kingshighway in the 1830s. As the mines attracted immigrant miners, they began to settle nearby areas.

The establishment of St. Aloysius Gonzaga parish in 1892 helped further spur settlement. As a historically German parish, St. Aloysius Gonzaga represented and attracted more Germans. The parish was located at Magnolia and January Avenues. It was razed in 2006.

== Demographics ==
Historical population
Census	Pop.	Note	%±
1990	5,203		—
2000	5,748		10.5%
2010	4,885		−15.0%
2020	5,245		7.4%

In 2020, Southwest Garden’s racial makeup was 73.8% White, 13.1% Black, 0.2% Native American, 4.7% Asian, 6.5% Two or More Races, and 1.8% Some Other Race. 4.5% of the people were of Hispanic or Latino origin.
