= Mid-City Tower =

- Interactive map of the Mid-City Tower area
- Former names: Dean Tower

General information
- Type: Skyscraper
- Location: Baton Rouge, Louisiana
- Coordinates: 30.4510094°N 91.1321053°W
- Completed: 1966

Height
- Height: 54 m

Technical details
- Floor count: 14

Design and construction
- Architects: Lewis P. Manson & Associates

Mid-City Tower is a skyscraper in Mid-City Baton Rouge, Louisiana. Its exterior surface is wrapped entirely in concrete and glass. Completed in 1966, it has 14 floors and stands a height 53 meters (174 ft) tall. It is currently the seventh-tallest building in Baton Rouge.

== History ==
In June 2013, Dean Tower was purchased and renamed Mid City Tower.

In July 2016, Mid City Tower owners filed for bankruptcy protection.

== See also ==
- List of tallest buildings in Baton Rouge
