= List of tallest buildings in Baton Rouge =

Baton Rouge is the capital city of Louisiana, in the United States. Situated on the Mississippi River, it is the second-largest city in Louisiana (with New Orleans as the largest).

Baton Rouge has many tall buildings. The eleven tallest buildings are: Louisiana State Capitol, One American Place, Chase Tower, Riverside Tower North, Marriott Hotel Baton Rouge, Memorial Tower, Mid-City Tower, St. Joseph Cathedral, Louisiana State Office Building, Jacobs Plaza, Hilton Baton Rouge Capitol Centre.

| Rank | Name | Image | Height feet (m) | Floors | Year | Notes |
|---|---|---|---|---|---|---|
| 1 | Louisiana State Capitol | | 460 (140) | 34 | 1932 | Tallest Capital Building in the US |
| 2 | One American Place | | 310 (94) | 24 | 1974 | |
| 3 | Chase Tower | | 277 (84) | 21 | 1968 | |
| 4 | Riverside Tower North | | 229 (70) | 20 | 1989 | |
| 5 | Marriott Hotel Baton Rouge | | 224 (68) | 22 | 1976 | Tallest building outside of Downtown |
| 6 | Memorial Tower | | 175 (53) | 2 | 1923 | |
| 7 | Mid-City Tower | | 174 (53) | 14 | 1966 | |
| 8 | St. Joseph Cathedral | | 165 (50) | | 1853 | |
| 9 | Louisiana State Office Building | | 160 (49) | 12 | 1927 | |
| 10 | Jacobs Plaza | | 144 (44) | 13 | 1989 | |
| 11 | Hilton Baton Rouge Capitol Center | | 132 (40) | 11 | 1927 | |

== See also ==
- List of tallest buildings in Louisiana
