= Second Presbyterian Church (St. Louis, Missouri) =

Historic church in Missouri, United States

- U.S. National Register of Historic Places
- St. Louis Landmark
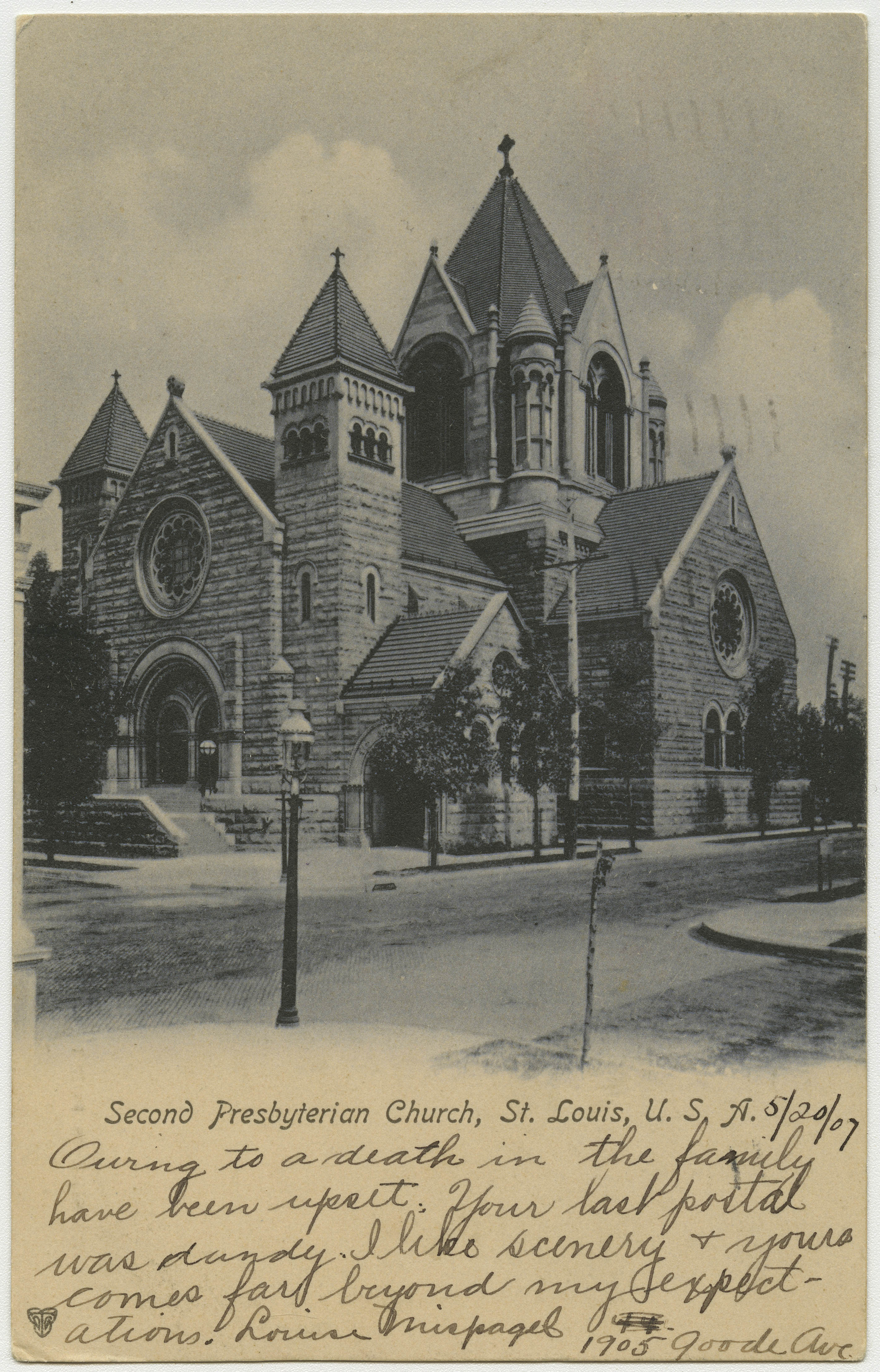
- Church on a 1907 postcard

- Location within St. Louis Location within Missouri Location within the United States
- Location: 4501 Westminster Pl., St. Louis, Missouri
- Coordinates: 38°38′51″N 90°15′20″W
- Area: 9.9 acres (4.0 ha)
- Built: 1896
- Architect: Multiple
- Architectural style: Romanesque architecture, Richardsonian Romanesque
- NRHP reference No.: 75002140
- Added to NRHP: September 11, 1975

Second Presbyterian Church is a historic church at 4501 Westminster Place in St. Louis, Missouri.

== History ==
The congregation was founded in 1838 by the Old School Presbytery of St. Louis. It has had three buildings. Its first building, designed in the Greek Revival architectural style and completed in 1840, was located at Fifth (Broadway) and Walnut Streets. Thirty years later, in 1870, a second church building was erected on Lucas Place at Seventeenth Street.

The third and current building was completed in 1896. It was designed by German-born architect Theodore C. Link. The adjacent education building was completed in 1931.

A large four-manual pipe organ by the Schantz Organ Company was installed in 1965. The organ's tonal design was provided by the church's minister of music Dr. Charles H. Heaton.

The church's Compton Lounge is named after Arthur Compton, who served as an elder in the church.

Edward Morris Bowman was organist and choirmaster at the church from 1877-1887.

== Architectural significance ==
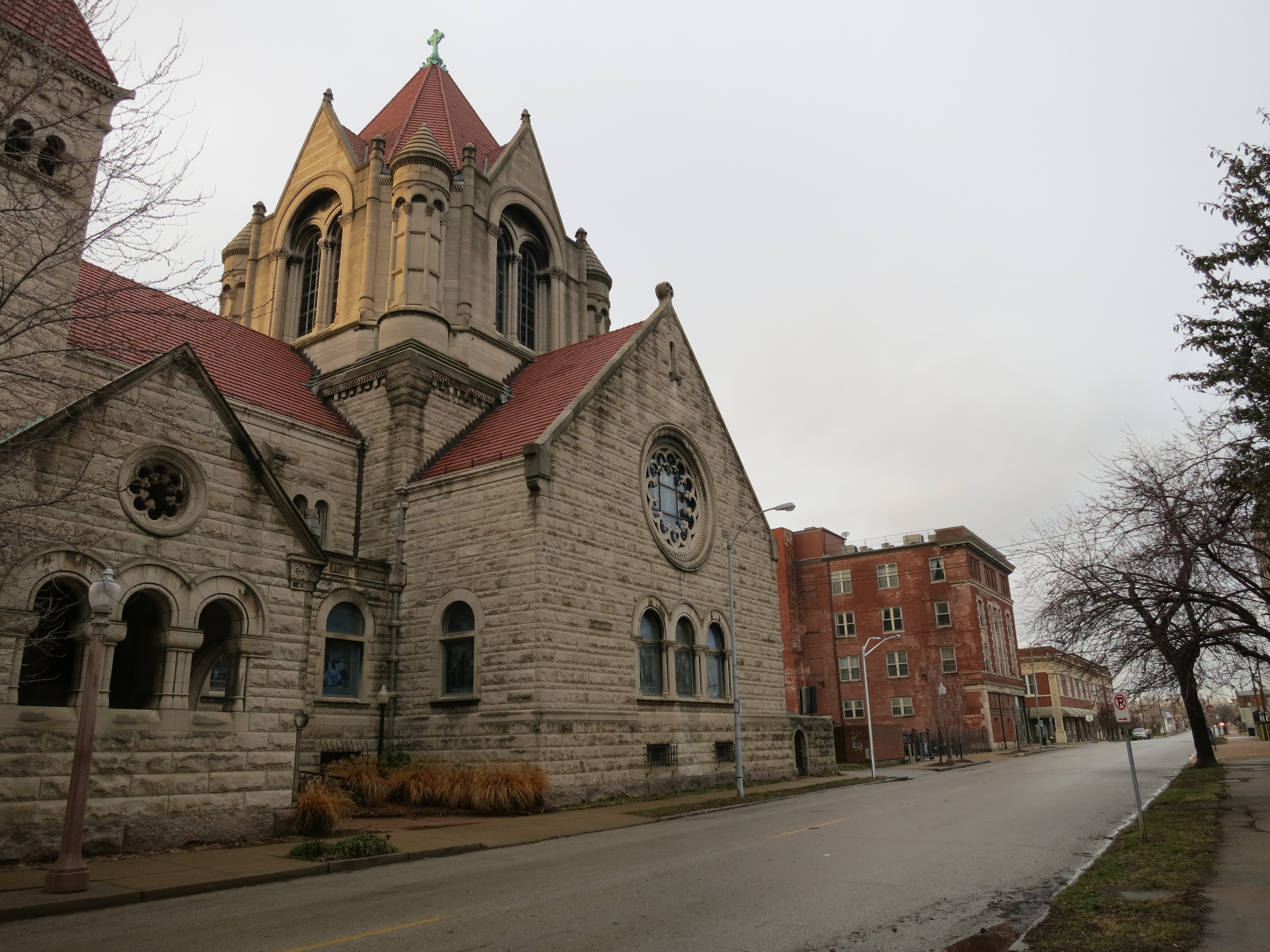
Second Presbyterian Church in 2013

It has been listed on the National Register of Historic Places since 1975.
