= Julius Pitzman =

American surveyor (1837–1923)

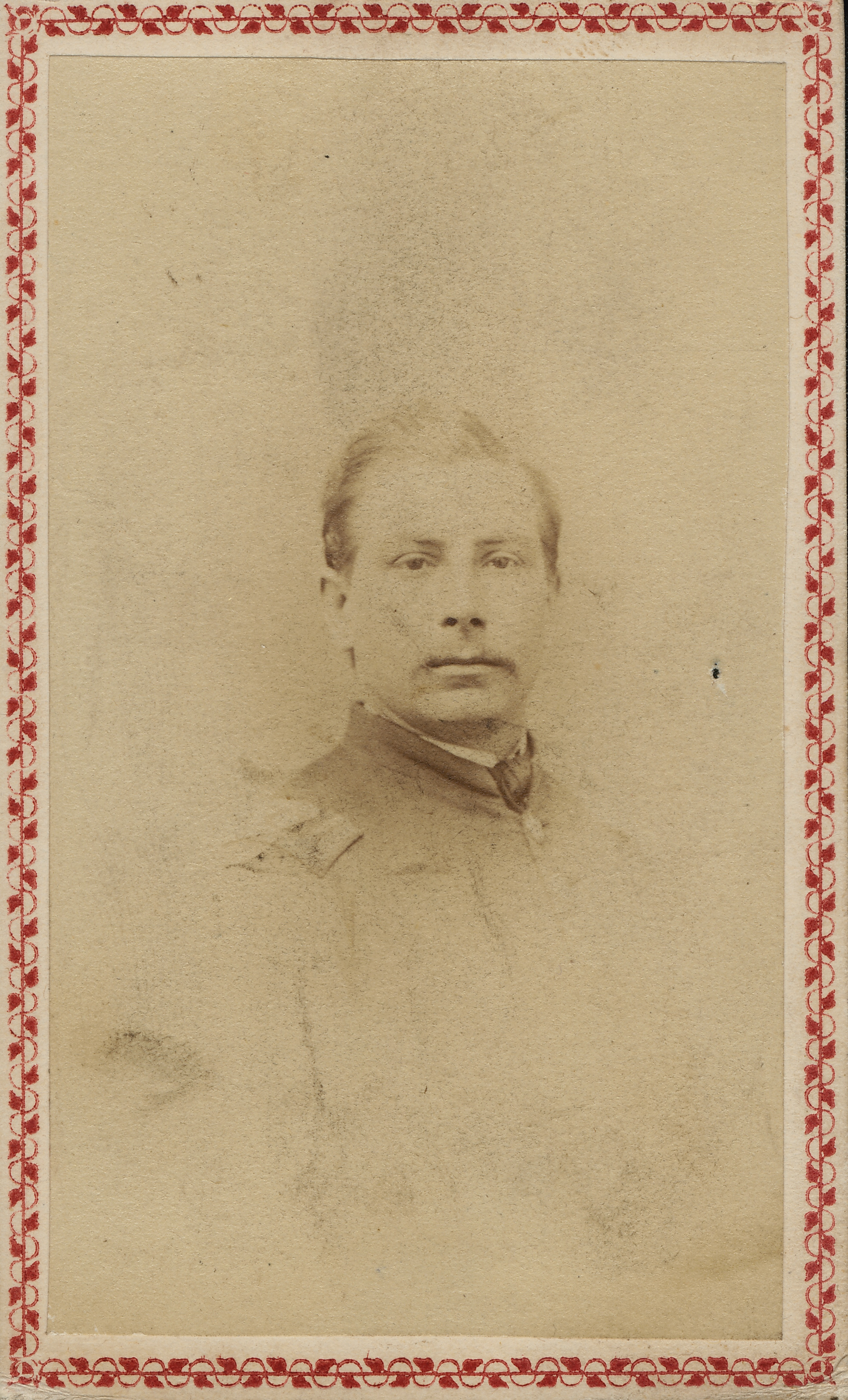
Julius Pitzman, 1st Lieutenant, Topographical Engineer (Union)

Julius Pitzman (1837–1923) was a Prussian-born American surveyor and city planner best known for his development of the private, gated neighborhoods in St. Louis, Missouri from 1867 through about 1914.

Originally from Halberstadt, Pitzman came to the U.S. and was educated as a Topographical and Civil Engineer under the tutelage of his brother-in-law, St. Louis City Engineer Charles E. Salomon, and held several posts within the Engineer and Survey offices before lending his services as a lieutenant of Topographical Engineers in the American Civil War.

Badly injured in the war, afterward Pitzman served as St. Louis County Surveyor. During his tenure he helped design Forest Park, along with Maximillian G. Kern. In addition, he worked closely with many notable architects including Theodore C. Link. Like Link, Pitzman is buried at Bellefontaine Cemetery, and Pitzman Avenue stands between the cemetery and the Mississippi River toward the northeast.

Pitzman's son Frederick Pitzman joined his father's firm in 1912, and the Pitzman Company was still in business in the 1990s.

== Private Places ==
Julius Pitzman was directly responsible for the development of the private place in St. Louis, a pioneering land-use concept both legally and in urban form, a direct precursor to the gated community. The idea allowed residential landowners to control real estate speculation and maintain property standards, in an era before the protections of zoning. Pitzman's use of curvilinear streets to maximize privacy and vary views was a novelty in that era.

The National Register of Historic Places nomination for the Parkview Historic District in University City, Missouri states that Pitzman "designed over 47 private streets in the St. Louis area in the fifty years following 1867 and (his) work was an important influence on other city planners and developers."

Pitzman himself planned some of the most affluent neighborhoods in the city, including Portland Place and Westmoreland Place. The Pitzman Company was responsible for the planning of Vandeventer Place, Compton Heights, Benton Place, Washington Terrace, Clifton Heights, and Parkview Place. Many of these developments are well-preserved and still gated, patrolled, and functioning as private enclaves.

Pitzman also designed a portion of the New Mount Sinai Cemetery in Affton, Missouri. He brought curving roads and luxuriant landscaping.
