= Memorial Tower =

Clock tower in Louisiana, US

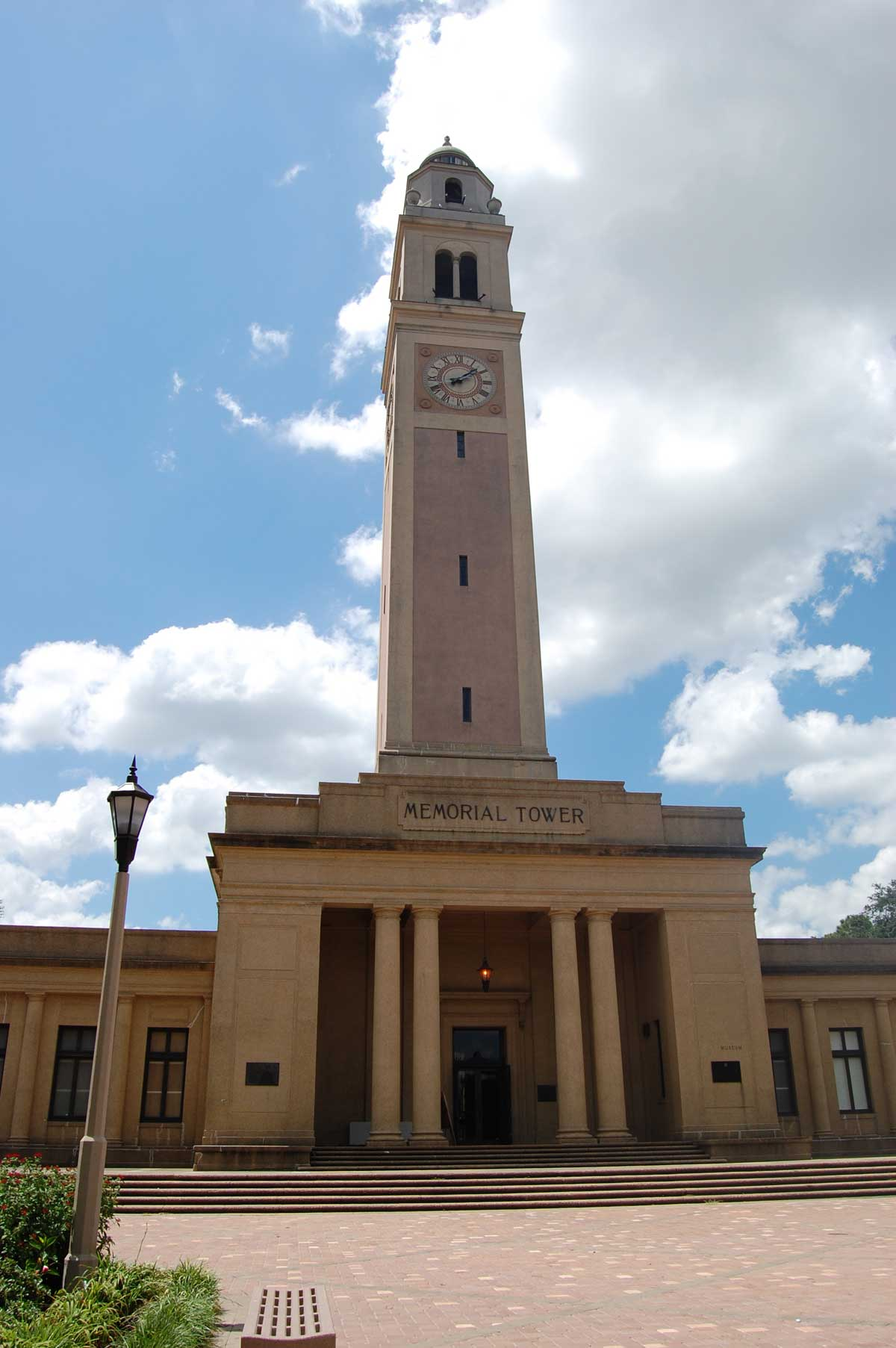
- Memorial Tower of LSU
- Interactive map of the Memorial Tower area

General information
- Type: Clock tower
- Architectural style: Italian Renaissance
- Location: Baton Rouge, Louisiana
- Coordinates: 30°24′52″N 91°10′44″W
- Construction started: 1923
- Completed: 1926
- Owner: Louisiana State University

Height
- Height: 175 ft (53 m)

Design and construction
- Architect: Theodore Link
- Memorial Tower
- U.S. Historic district – Contributing property
- Part of: Louisiana State University, Baton Rouge (ID88001586)
- Designated CP: September 15, 1988

Memorial Tower, or the Campanile as it is sometimes called, is a 175-foot clock tower in the center of Louisiana State University's campus in Baton Rouge, Louisiana, United States. Erected in 1923 and officially dedicated in 1926, it stands as a memorial to Louisianans who died in World War I.

== The Plaza ==
The plaza area in front of Memorial Tower has served as a place of both ceremony and celebration. The University's annual Christmas Tree Lighting Ceremony takes place on the plaza and attracts many visitors to the area. In addition, Student Government holds the formal installation for its new President and Vice President each spring. Valentine's Day is especially important for the plaza, as superstition turned tradition says to become an official "LSU student," one must be kissed under the Memorial Tower when the chimes ring at midnight. Those wishing to carry out the tradition today find that the chimes no longer ring after 10 p.m. except for the evening of Valentine's Day.

Upon entering the tower, visitors find the rotunda of bronze plaques bearing the names of 1,447 fallen Louisiana World War I soldiers, to whom the tower is dedicated. The inside of the tower is also home to a military museum.

== The Chimes ==
Each quarter-hour, the LSU community can hear the sound of chimes coming from the bells of the clock tower. The Westminster Chimes are used each day until 10p.m. At noon, the University's alma mater is played.

== See also ==
- List of tallest buildings in Baton Rouge
