= Washington Terrace (St. Louis) =

- Waterman Place--Kingsbury Place--Washington Terrace Historic District
- U.S. National Register of Historic Places
- U.S. Historic district
- St. Louis Landmark
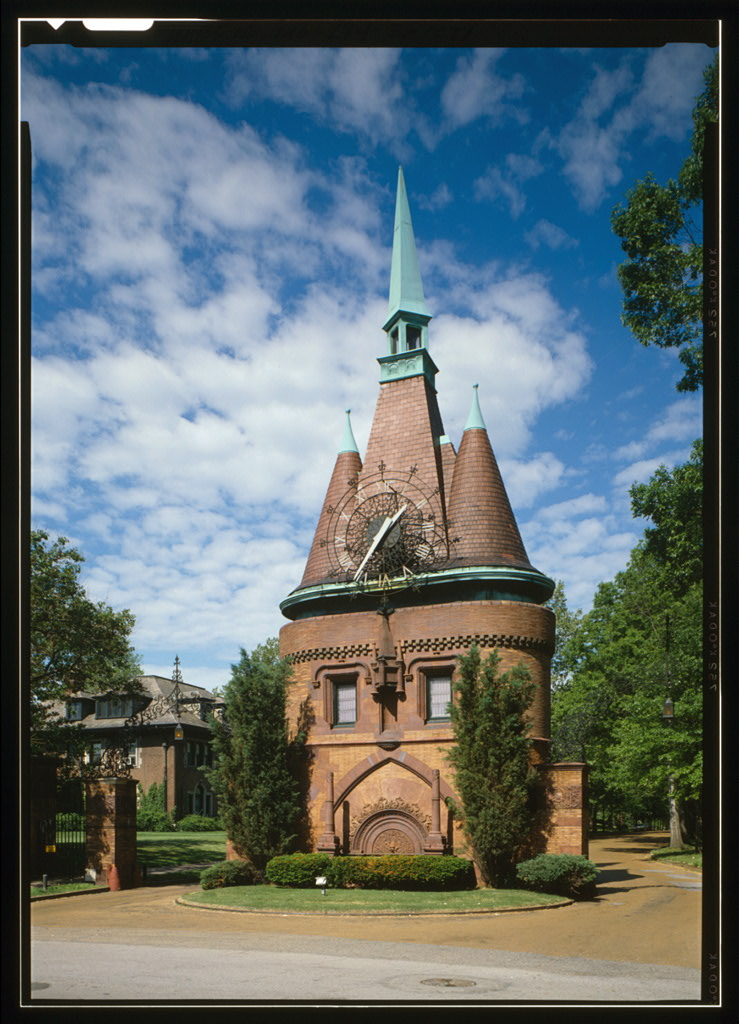
- Gate at Washington Terrace

- Location within St. Louis Location within Missouri Location within the United States
- Location: Bounded by Union Blvd., alley S of Waterman Place, Belt Ave., alley S of Kingsbury Place, Clara Ave., alley line bet, St. Louis, Missouri
- Coordinates: 38°39′05″N 90°16′26″W
- Area: 66.7 acres (27.0 ha)
- Architect: Julius Pitzman; Harvey Ellis; George R. Mann; Barnett, Haynes & Barnett; George W. Hellmuth
- Architectural style: Late 19th And 20th Century Revivals, Colonial Revival
- NRHP reference No.: 07000549
- Added to NRHP: June 12, 2007

Washington Terrace is a residential private place in St. Louis, Missouri, laid out circa 1892. The gate is south of Union and Delmar, within the bounds of the Central West End.

A private place is a self-governing enclave whose common areas like streets and common gardens are owned by the residents, with services provided by the private sector, an experiment that foreshadowed the gated community in the U.S. by 100 years. About 50 of these enclaves once stood within the borders of the city of St. Louis. Most were designed by civil engineer Julius Pitzman between 1868 and 1905. Many of these developments, like Washington Terrace, are well-preserved and still gated, patrolled, and functioning as private enclaves.

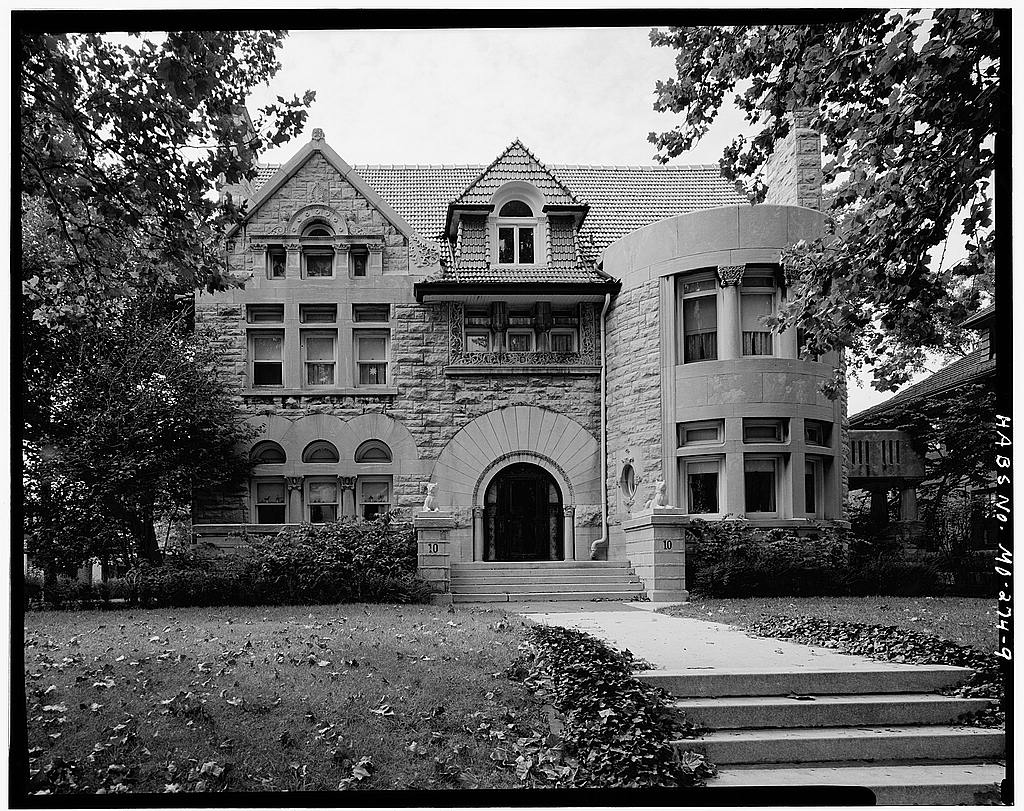
Number 10, Washington Terrace

Pitzman laid out Washington Terrace with 50 lots and an imposing entry gate, a "French Norman Clock Tower" designed by Harvey Ellis and the architect George R. Mann. The styles of the mansions, many of them built in anticipation of the 1904 Louisiana Purchase Exposition and constructed atop substantial pedestals, range from Italian Renaissance, Richardsonian Romanesque and Tudor.

Number 25 Washington Terrace, for instance, was the residence of Joseph W. Moon, of St. Louis's once-successful Moon Motor Car. Number 11 was the home of Julius Adler Baer, of Stix, Baer and Fuller.
