= Chase Tower (Baton Rouge) =

Building in Baton Rouge, Louisiana, US

Coordinates: 30°26′59″N 91°11′11″W

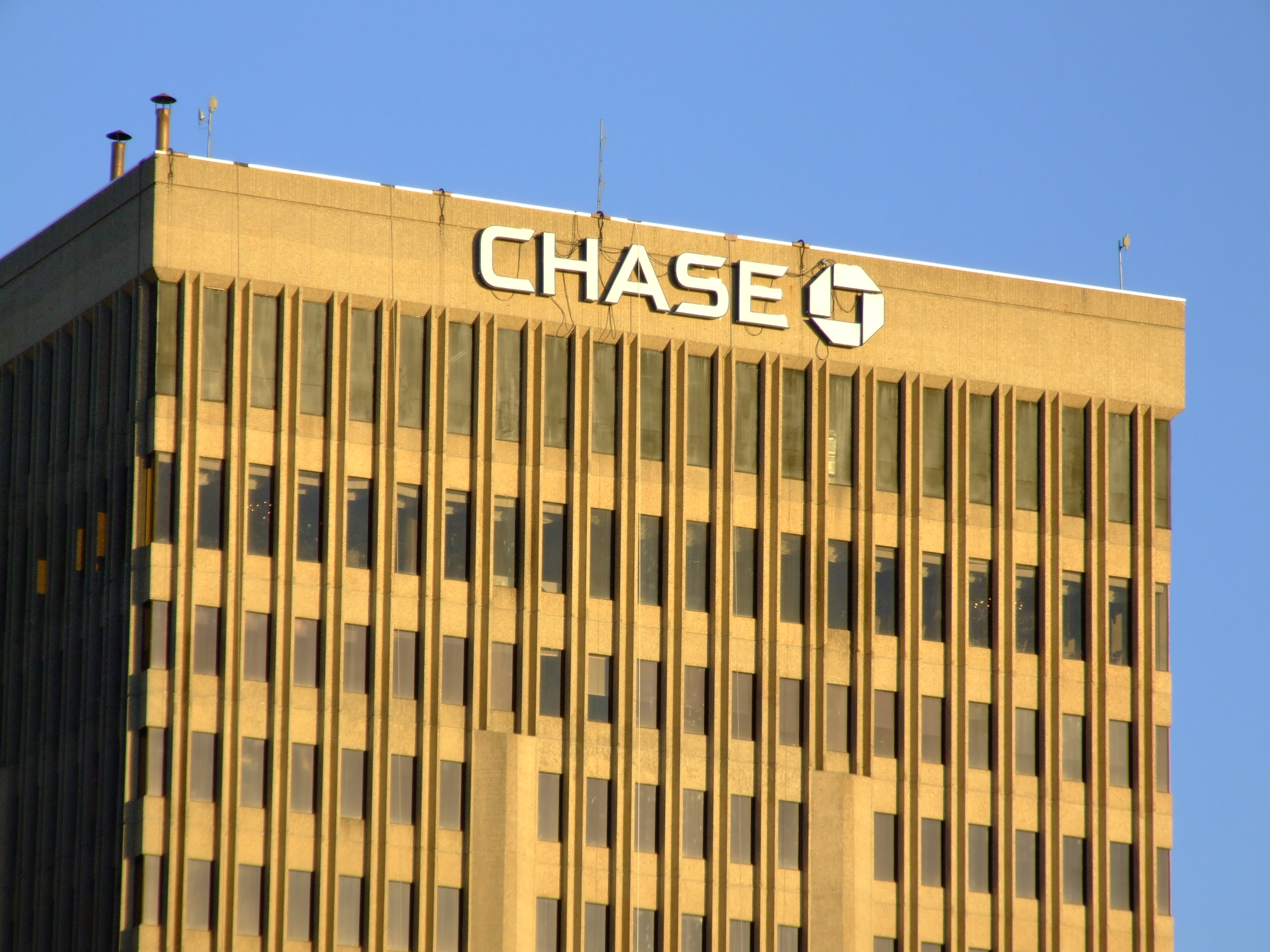

The Chase Tower is a 21-story building in Baton Rouge, Louisiana, that serves as a business suite for many small businesses. It is the south tower of two towers, its counterpart being the Chase North Tower.

In 2022 The Chase Towers were renamed the Rivermark Centre and renovated.

== See also ==
- List of tallest buildings in Baton Rouge
