= One American Place =

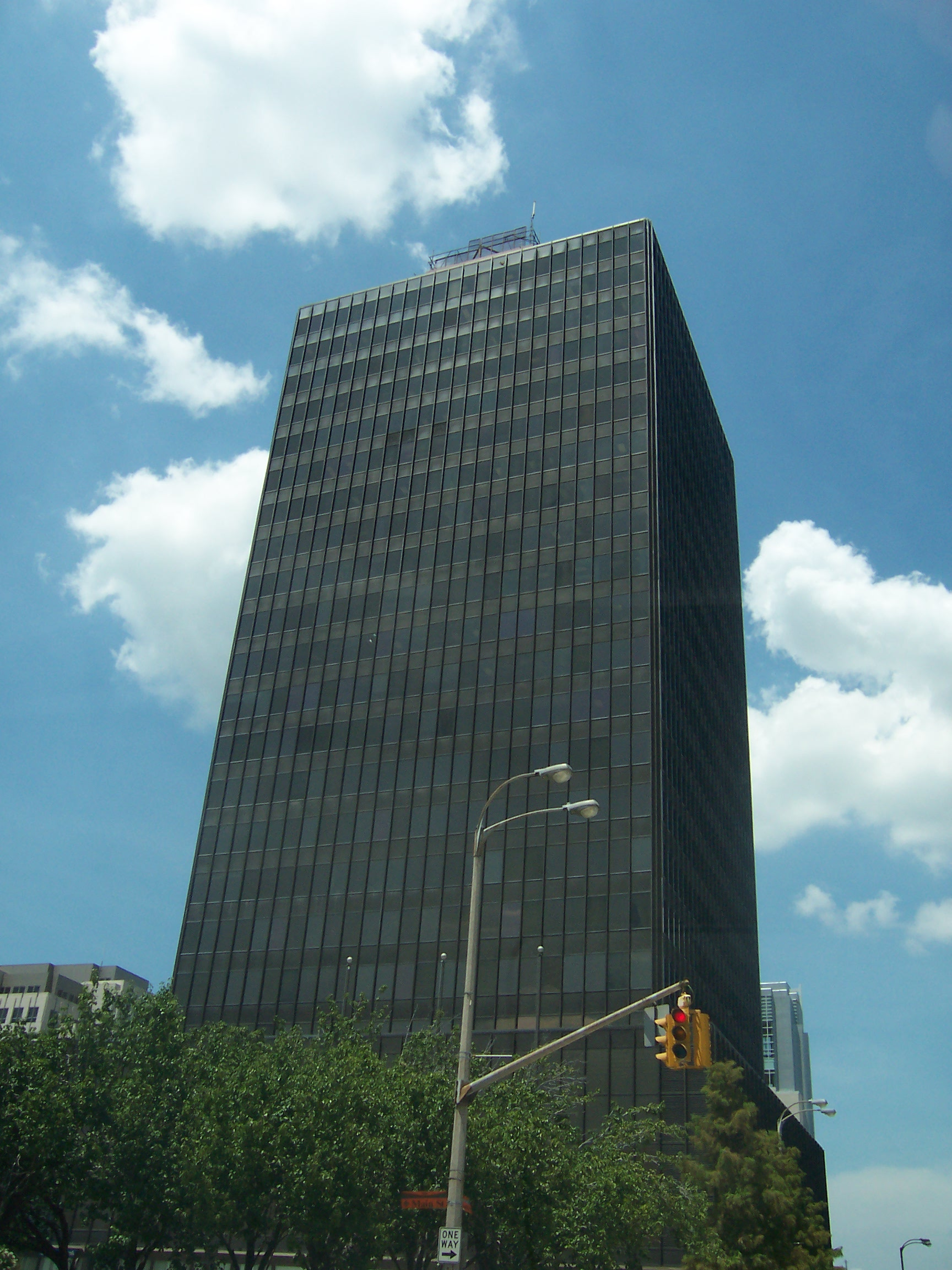
- One American Place
- Interactive map of the One American Place area

General information
- Type: Skyscraper
- Location: Baton Rouge, Louisiana
- Coordinates: 30.452°N 91.1876°W
- Completed: 1974

Height
- Height: 308 feet

Technical details
- Floor count: 24
- Floor area: 330,000 sq ft

Design and construction
- Architects: Broussard Thaddeus Perkins & Will

One American Place is a skyscraper in Downtown Baton Rouge, Louisiana. Its exterior surface is clad entirely in mirrored glass. Completed in 1974, with 24 floors, it stands 308 feet tall. It is currently the second-tallest building in Downtown Baton Rouge.

== See also ==
- List of tallest buildings in Baton Rouge
