= Theodore Link =

German-born American architect

Theodore Carl Link
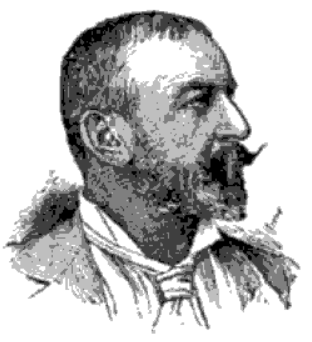
- Born: March 17, 1850; Baden-Württemberg, Germany
- Died: November 12, 1923 (aged 73); Baton Rouge, Louisiana
- Resting place: Bellefontaine Cemetery
- Education: University of Heidelberg; École Centrale Paris
- Occupation: Architect
- Spouse: Annie Fuller (m. 1875)

Signature
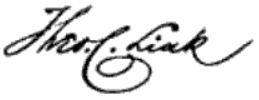

Theodore C. Link, FAIA, (March 17, 1850 – November 12, 1923) was a German-born American architect and newspaper publisher. He designed buildings for the 1904 World's Fair, Louisiana State University, and the Mississippi State Capitol.

His best known work is in the Richardsonian Romanesque style, specifically the St. Louis Union Station (1894), and the Second Presbyterian Church (1899). The Theodore Link Historic Buildings (c. 1911) in University City are three private residences on Delmar Boulevard that are listed on the National Register of Historic Places listings in St. Louis County, Missouri.

== Early life ==
Theodore Carl Link was born on March 17, 1850, near Heidelberg, Germany. He was trained in engineering at the University of Heidelberg and the École Centrale Paris.

== Career ==
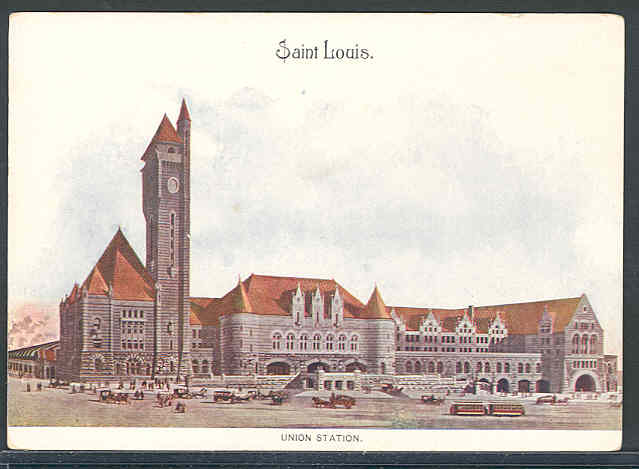
St. Louis Union Station

Link immigrated to the United States, arriving in St. Louis in 1873 to work for the Atlantic and Pacific Railroad company. He married Annie Fuller on September 22, 1875. That year, St. Louis surveyor Julius Pitzman recommended him to the job of superintendent of public parks for St. Louis. In 1889, Link joined the American Institute of Architects and started his own private architectural practice.

After a four-year interim as a German-language newspaper publisher in Pittsburgh, Pennsylvania, Link returned to St. Louis just after the turn of the century as one of the architects for the 1904 World's Fair. In 1901, he won the competition to design the new Mississippi State Capitol building in Jackson, which was completed two years later. He also "designed most of the buildings for LSU when the campus was relocated in the 1920s."

== Death and legacy ==
Link died in Baton Rouge while working on the new Louisiana State University campus, and was interred at Bellefontaine Cemetery in St. Louis. In 1995 was awarded a star on the St. Louis Walk of Fame.

== Work ==
Among the 100+ buildings he designed:

- 1869 Monticello Seminary (now Lewis and Clark Community College), Godfrey, Illinois
- 1891 gates and several houses for two of St. Louis's private places, Westmoreland Place and Portland Place
- 1894 St. Louis Union Station, modeled on the fortifications of Carcassonne, with architect Edward Cameron
- 1899 Second Presbyterian Church, 4501 Westminster Place, St. Louis
- 1901 St. John's United Methodist Church, 5000 Washington Place
- 1901 Wabash Railroad Station and Railway Express Agency, 780 East Cerro Gordo Street, Decatur, Illinois
- 1902 Wabash Railroad Station, Danville, Illinois
- 1903 Wabash Pittsburgh Terminal, Liberty Avenue at Ferry Street, Pittsburgh, Pennsylvania
- 1903 Mississippi State Capitol, Jackson, Mississippi
- 1904 Palace of Mines and Metallurgy at the 1904 World's Fair (razed)
- 1904 Reid Hall and campus master plan for Washington and Lee University
- 1906 Barr Branch, St. Louis Public Library
- 1908 Wednesday Club building and auditorium in St. Louis, Missouri
- 1910 Roberts Shoe (International Shoe) Company Building, St. Louis, with ornament influenced by Louis Sullivan
- 1911 Theodore Link Historic Buildings, 7100, 7104 and 7108 Delmar Blvd, University City, Missouri
- 1919–1923, master plan and nine buildings for the Louisiana State University, including the Memorial Tower, with W. T. Trueblood

== Images ==
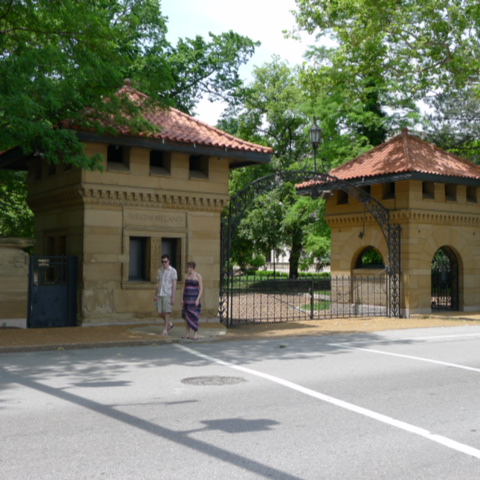
Westmoreland Place gates, St. Louis, Missouri

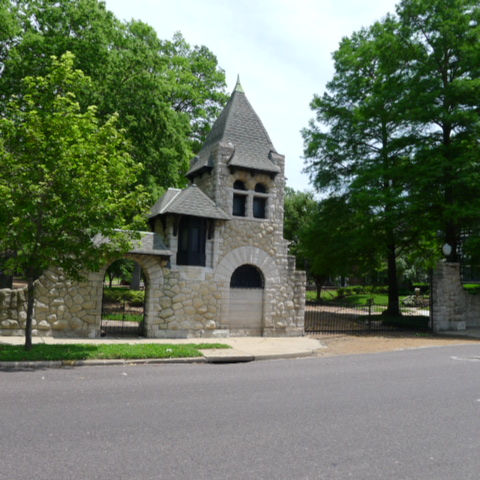
Portland Place gates, St. Louis, Missouri

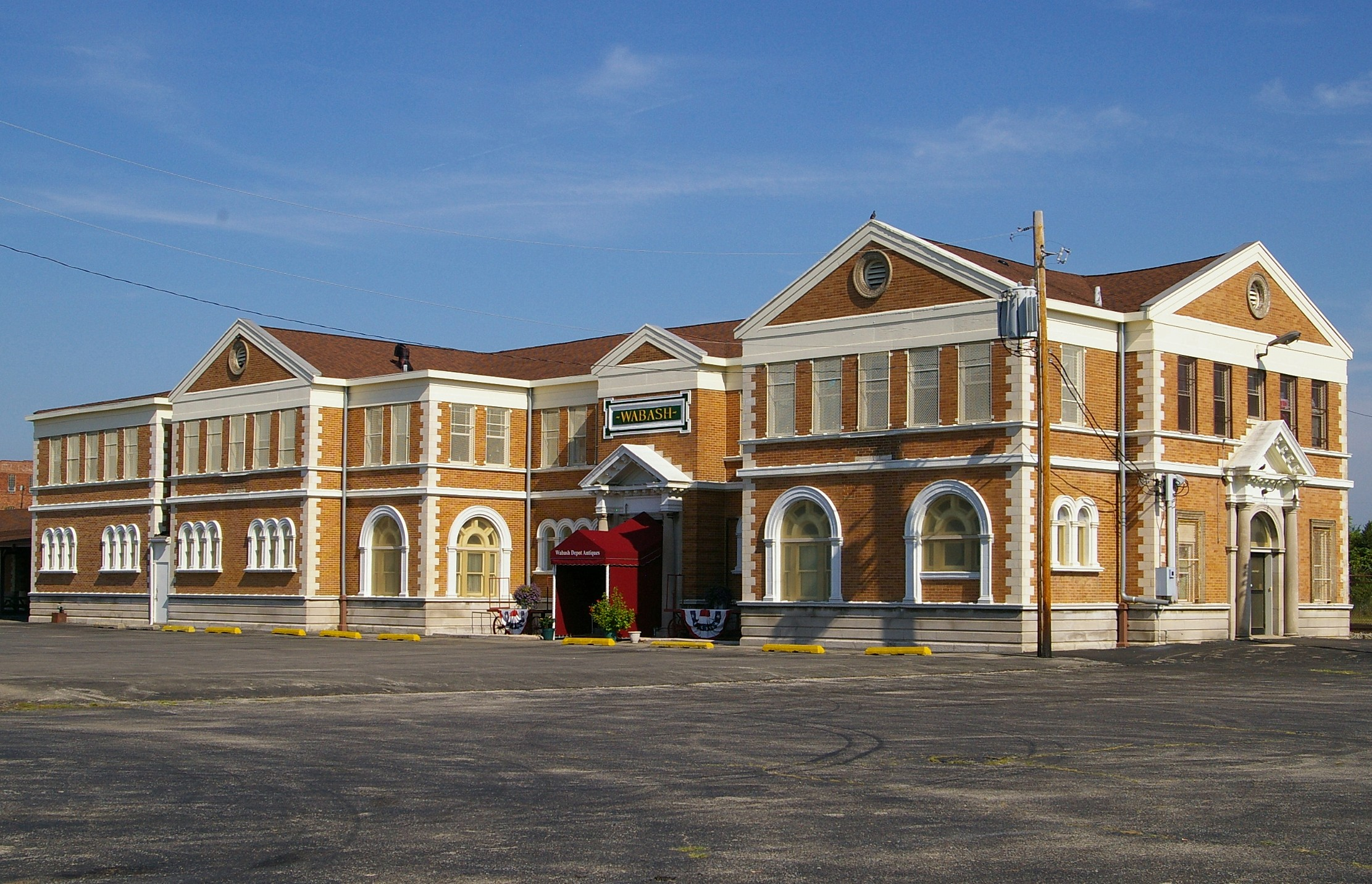
Wabash Station, Decatur, Illinois

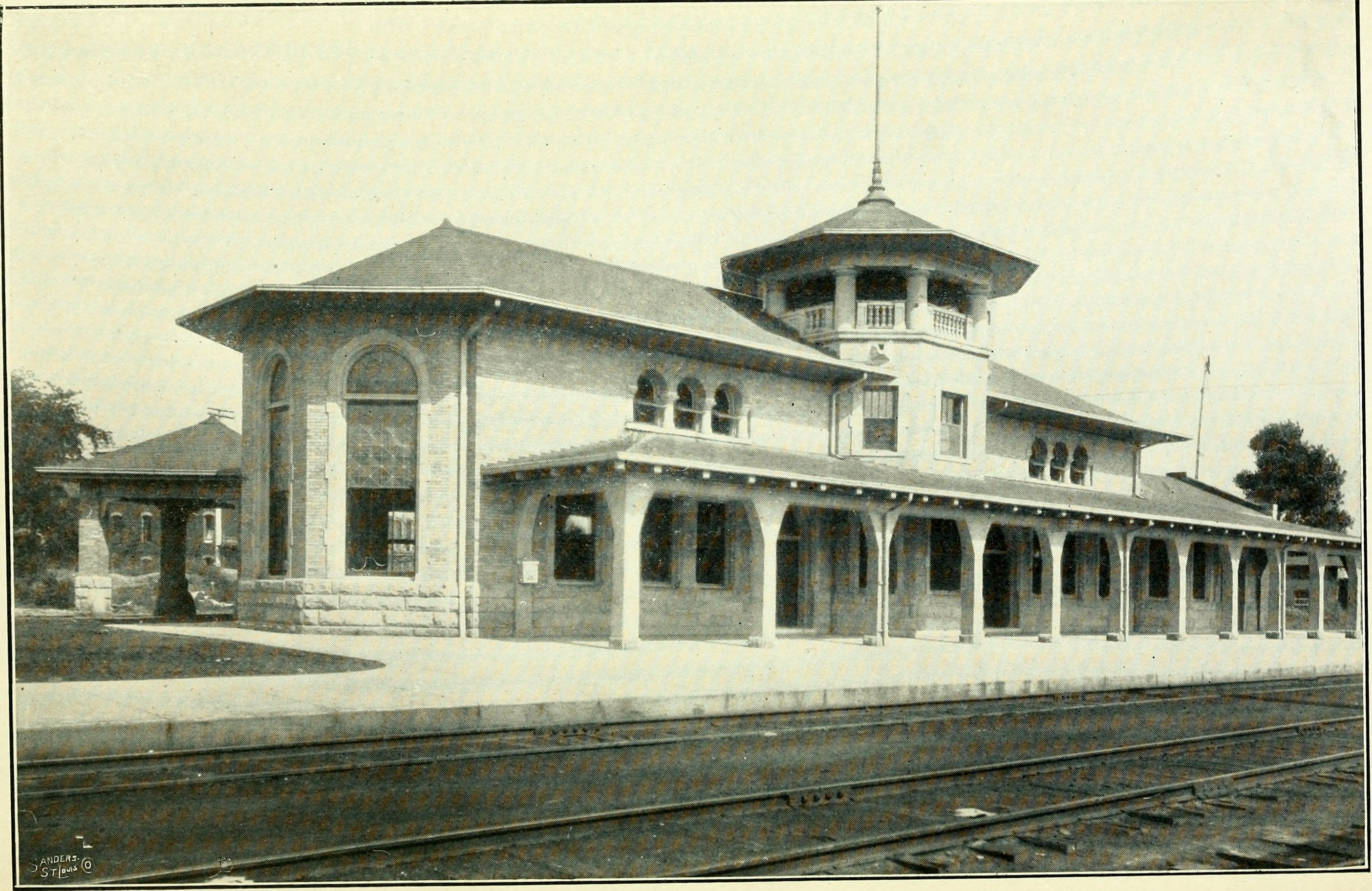
Wabash Station, Decatur, Illinois

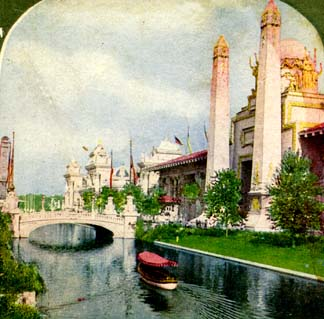
Palace of Mines and Metallurgy, 1904 World's Fair

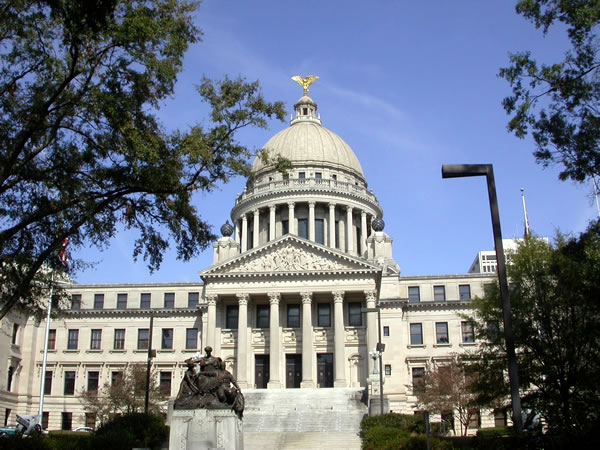
Mississippi State Capitol

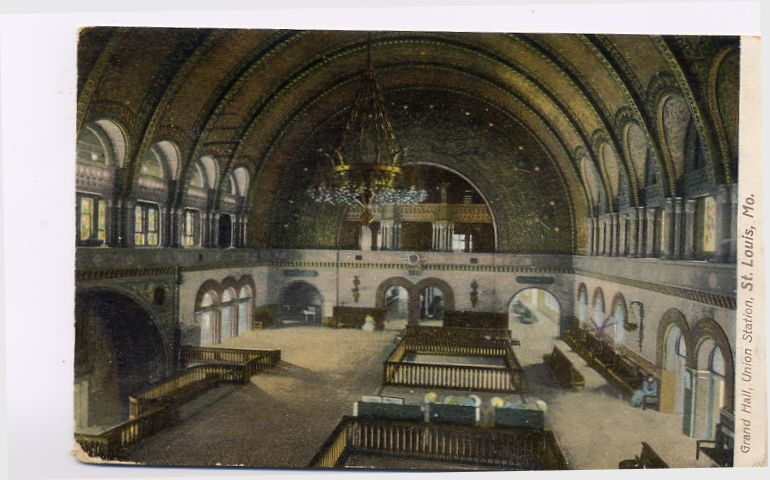
Grand Hall, St. Louis Union Station

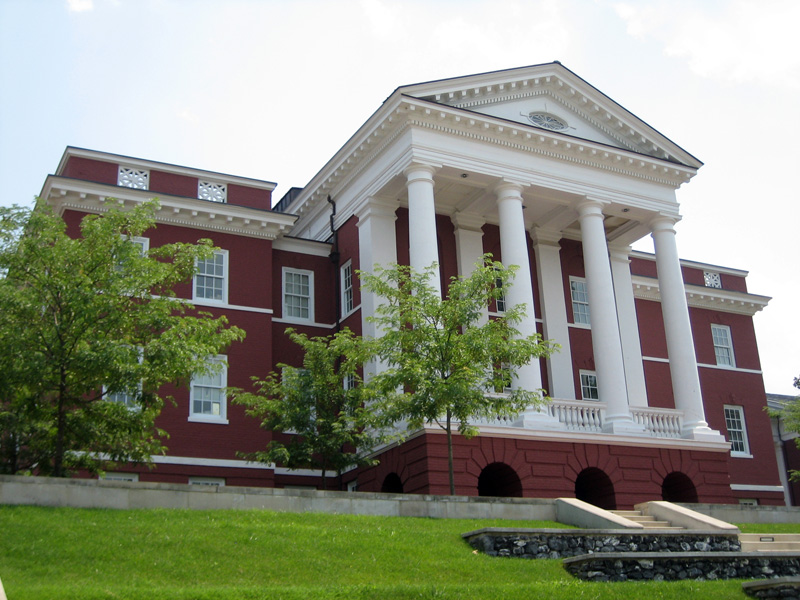
Reid Hall, Washington and Lee University

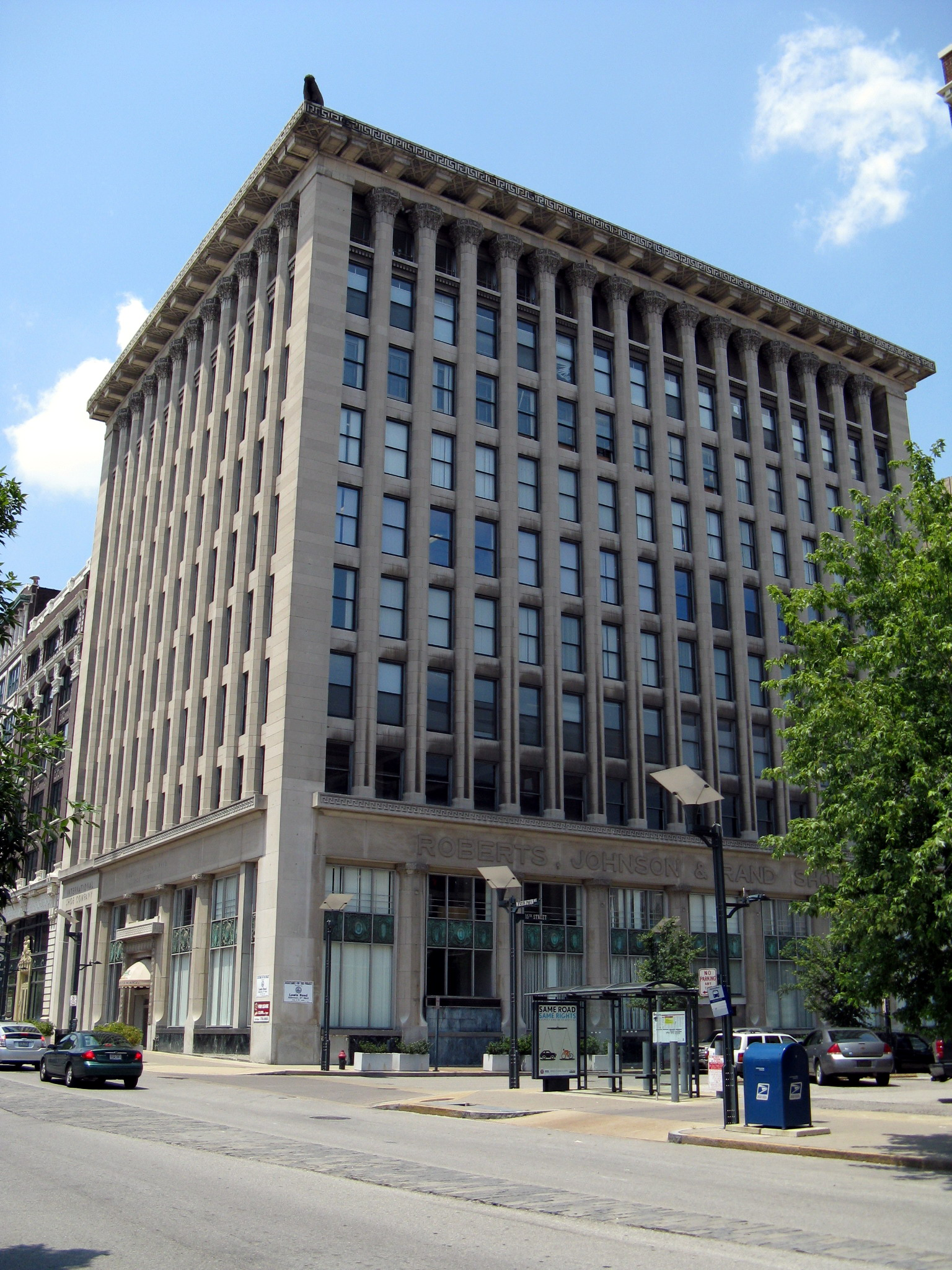
Roberts Shoe Company Building, St. Louis, Missouri

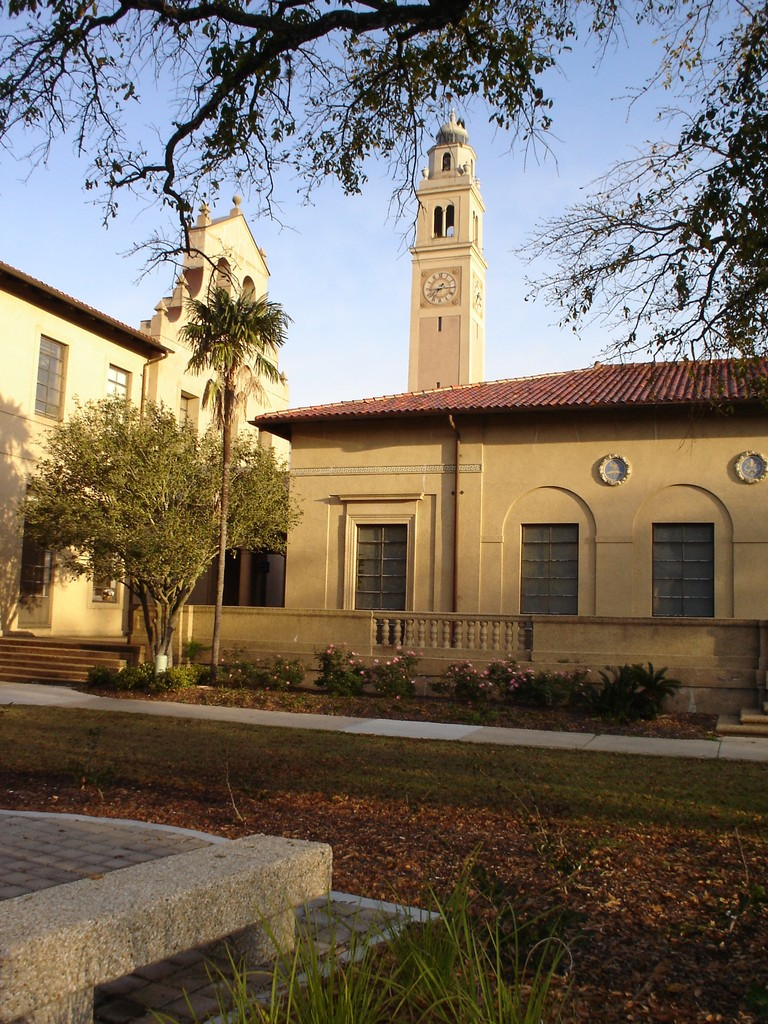
Memorial Tower at LSU

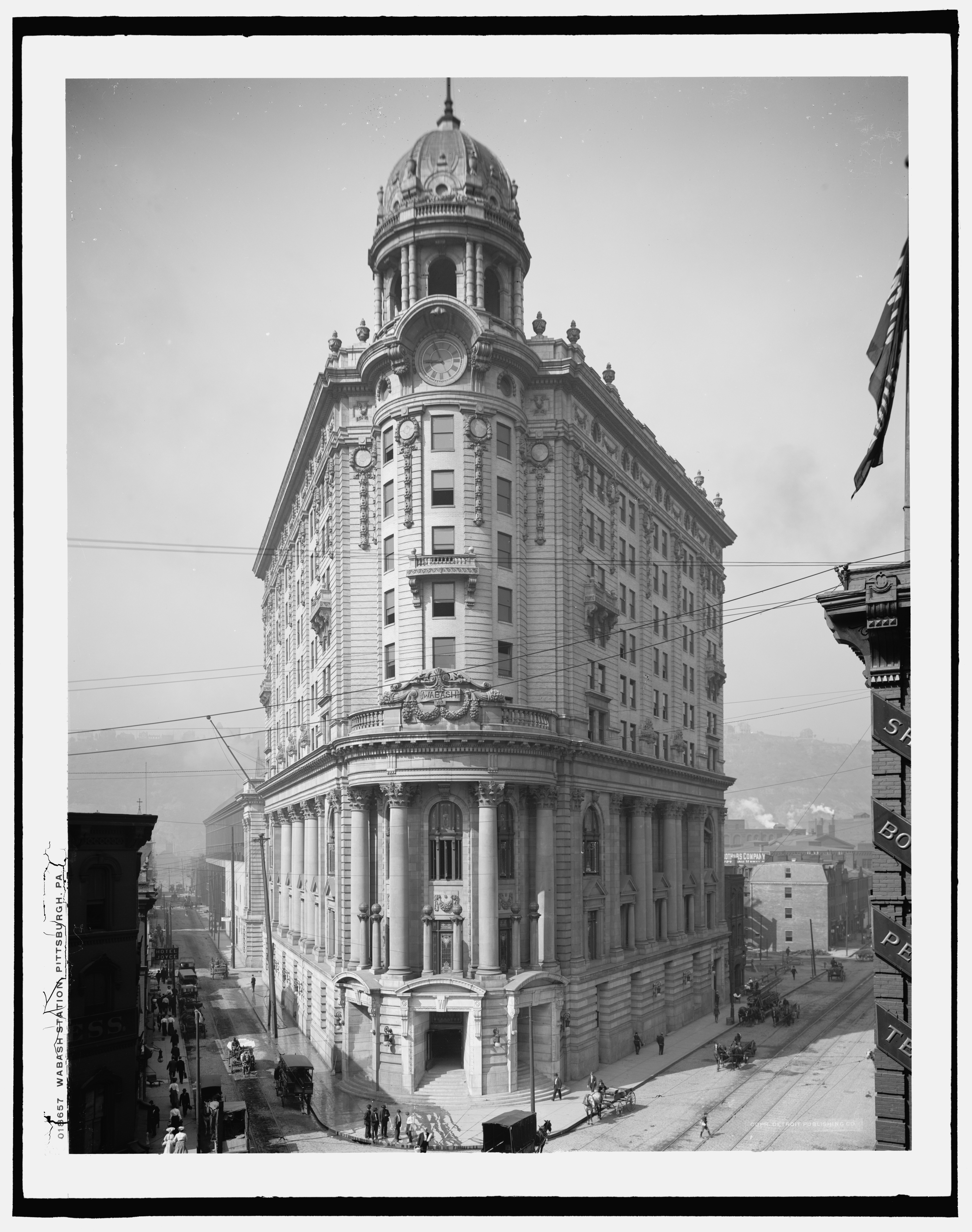
Wabash Pittsburgh Terminal, Pittsburgh, Pennsylvania
