= Meier and Comfort =

20th-century American real estate firm

Meier & Comfort, Inc.
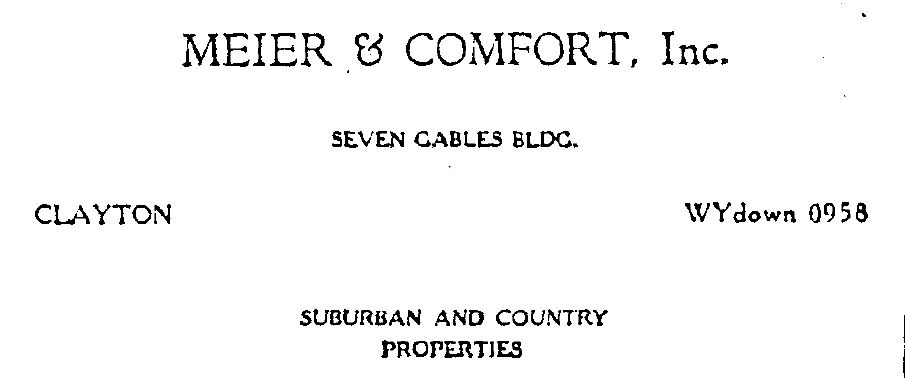
- Company type: Corporation
- Industry: Real estate development
- Headquarters: Clayton, Missouri
- Key people: Norman B. Comfort, Gunther Meier, Daniel H. Mullen

Meier and Comfort (originally called Hawke and Comfort) was a real estate development firm active in the 1920s in the St. Louis suburbs of Clayton and Ladue, Missouri, United States. The firm was the first to develop private place neighborhoods in Ladue, and their work was influential in establishing the architectural character of the city.

The partners of the firm were Norman B. Comfort and Gunther Meier. Both men were World War I veterans with Major Comfort receiving distinction for his combat service in France. While in Europe during the war, the men became interested in the native architecture and particularly with Tudor design. As a result, the firm, who frequently partnered with architect Daniel H. Mullen, favored Tudor Revival designs.

== Private place developments ==
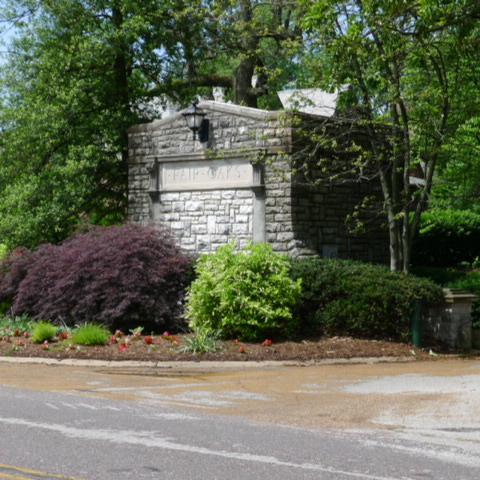
Tudor entry into Fair Oaks Estates designed by Daniel H. Mullen

In the 19th century, Ladue (then unincorporated and simply known as Township 45) was a primarily agricultural area consisting of farms and modest dwellings. At the turn of the 20th century, several private clubs were built on former farmland such as The Log Cabin Club (1899), The Bogey Club (1902), and the St. Louis Country Club (1914). Wealthy St. Louisans, like Joseph Pulitzer, then built sprawling country estates in Ladue to be near the clubs and to escape the heat and pollution of the city.

Recognizing the growing prominence of the area in the 1920s, Meier and Comfort bought several tracts of land in the district and subdivided them into private place neighborhoods. Their development plans were unique in that they sought to strike a balance between the urban sense of community, typical of the city's private places, with the aura of landed gentry that was characterizing then-rural Ladue.

In order to foster community, their developments were established as resident-governing private places. Additionally, unlike many other real estate developments of the time, all the houses faced inwards (towards each other) with their backyards bordering the surrounding streets. At the time, it was considered preferable to have one's address on a major street due to the better accessibility, but Meier and Comfort envisioned a self-contained community that was inclusive of all the residents, but somewhat exclusive of the outside world.

In order to retain a rural atmosphere, they designed lot sizes that were larger than typical (up to two acres). Inspired by the nearby country lanes, their street designs were not lined with curbs, sidewalks, or street lamps as was the practice in neighboring Clayton and St. Louis. Meier and Comfort neighborhoods also tended to avoid flat, grid-patterned street plans and instead favored designs with curved and sloped streets that followed the natural topography of the land.

Meier and Comfort was the first real estate firm in the area to build a few "spec homes" in their subdivisions in addition to selling empty lots on which buyers would build. Their motivation was not as much to profit from the building of the home, but to raise the value of the remaining lots by establishing a precedent of high quality homes in the new neighborhood.

The private places created by Meier and Comfort would become the model for the neighborhoods in Ladue to follow and the design choices they made would become characteristic of Ladue's architecture. When the City of Ladue was formally established in 1936, many of the new city's building codes and property ordinances were continuations of the standards set by Meier and Comfort.

=== List of neighborhoods developed by Meier and Comfort ===
- Picardy Lane (originally called Exermont), phase 1 - 1924, phase 2 - 1925, phase 3 - 1929
- Fair Oaks Estates, 1924
- Clermont Lane, 1924
- Oakleigh Lane, 1925
- Clermont Park, 1926
- Glen Forest, 1928
- York Village (in neighboring Brentwood)
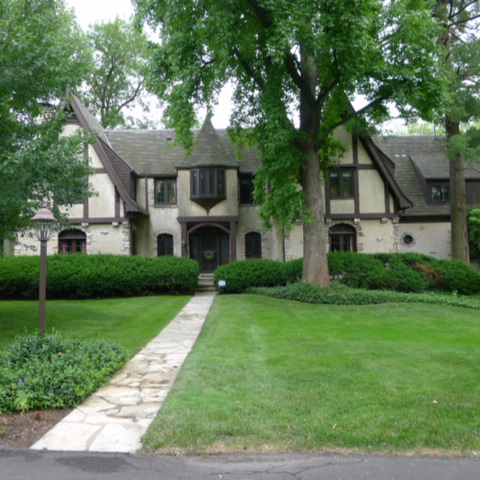
16 Picardy

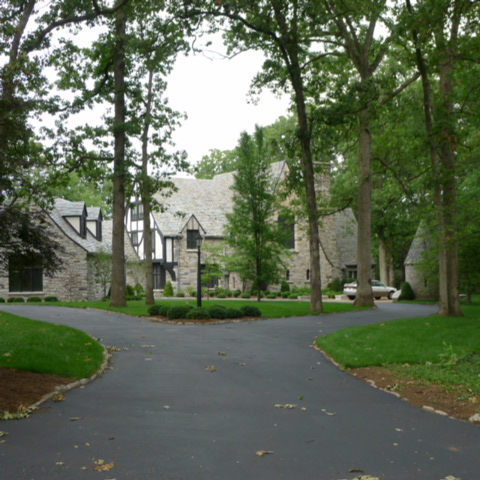
4 Fair Oaks

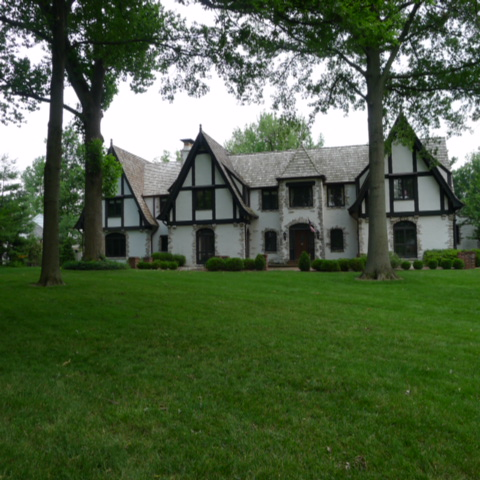
28 Clermont

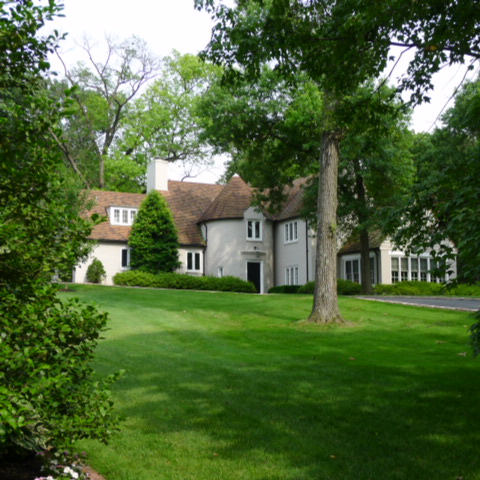
4 Oakleigh

== Seven Gables Building ==
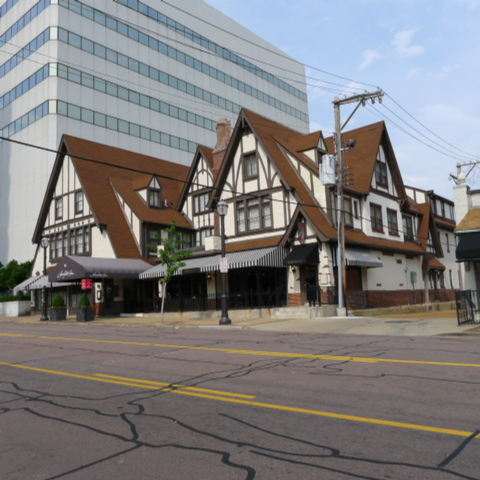
Seven Gables Building

The Seven Gables Building at 26 Meramec Avenue in downtown Clayton was developed by Meier and Comfort and designed by their frequent partner Daniel H. Mullen. It was built in 1926 for the cost of $60,000. The Tudor Revival architectural style was unusual for commercial buildings at the time. Both Meier and Comfort and Daniel Mullen kept their offices in the building. Today, it serves as a hotel and is on the National Register of Historic Places.

== Mystery of Comfort's death ==
On January 27, 1934, Norman Comfort was playing bridge with friends at his home on 37 Clermont Lane. He went upstairs to get a fresh deck of cards when his guests heard a gunshot. They found Comfort dead, with a bullet wound to his right temple and with a revolver and box of cards on the ground under his leg. The life insurance company considered the event a suicide and denied his widow's claim. After a lawsuit that included the testimony of the party guests, a jury ruled it an accident and that Mrs. Comfort was entitled to the $30,000 policy. In addition to the life insurance policy and company stock, Comfort's estate was valued at a considerable $1,381,000.
