= Clifton Heights, St. Louis =

Neighborhood of St. Louis in Missouri, US

Clifton Heights
- Neighborhood of St. Louis
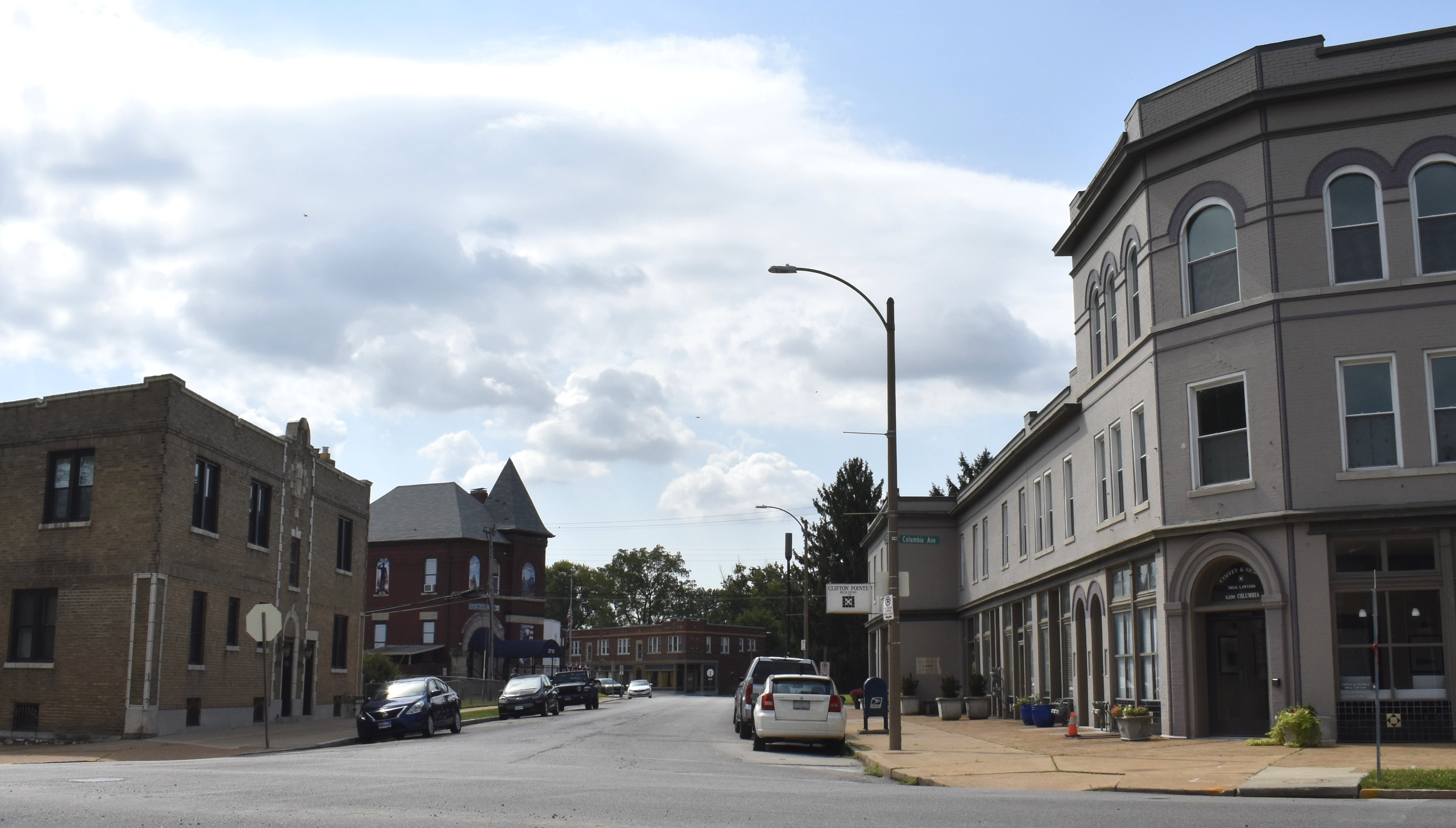
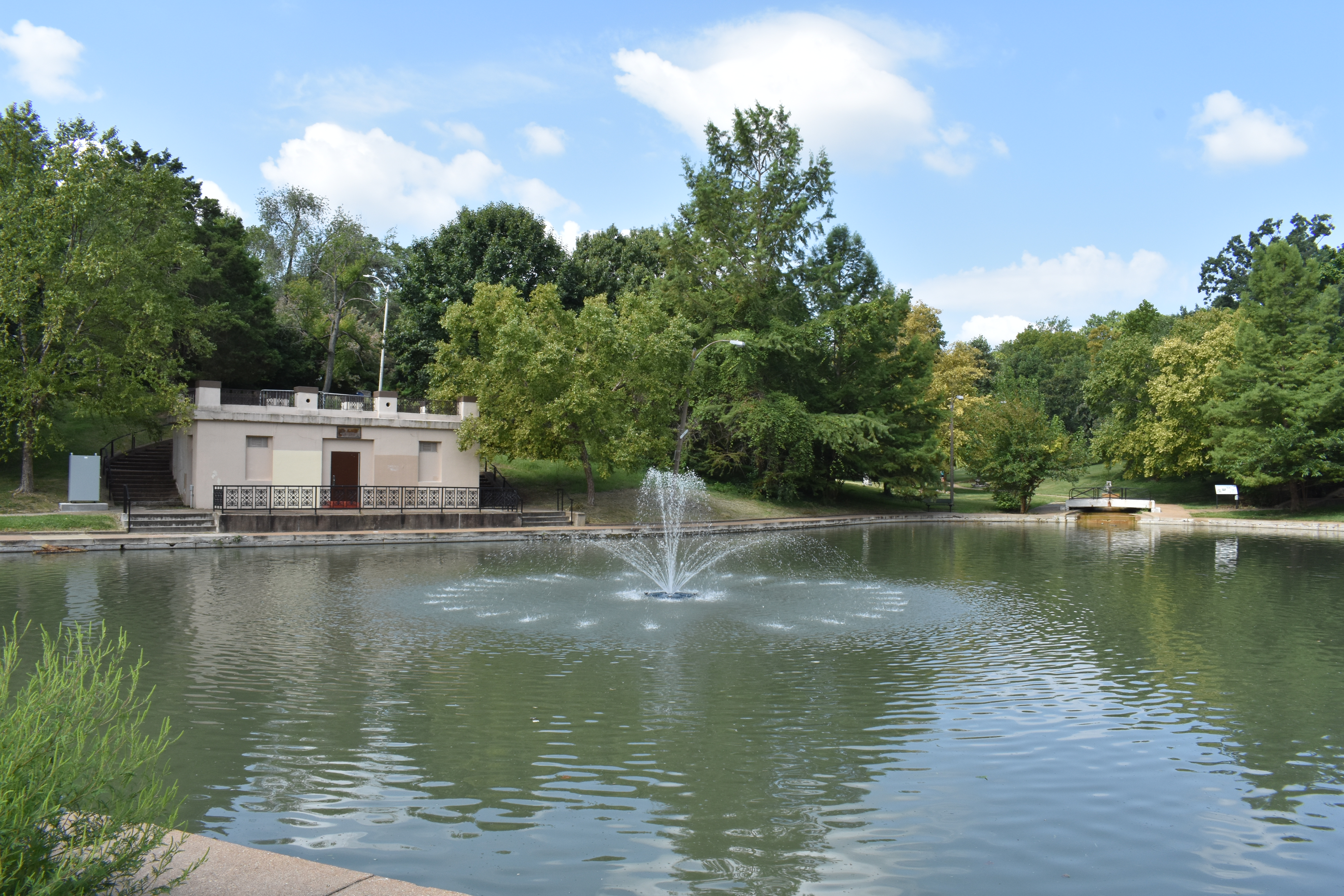
- Clifton Heights in 2026 Clifton Heights Park

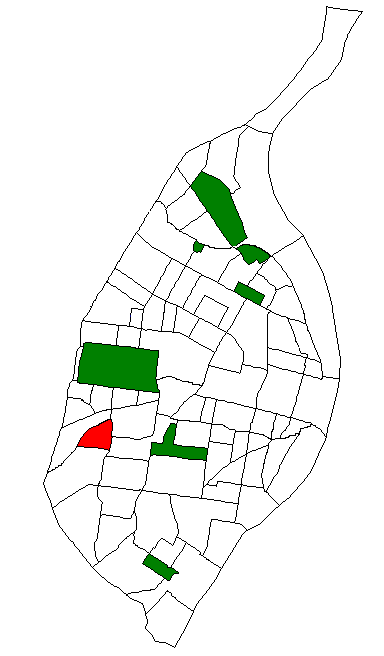
- Location (red) of Clifton Heights within St. Louis
- Country: United States
- State: Missouri
- City: St. Louis
- Ward: 4

Government
  - Alderperson: Bret Narayan

Area
  - Total: 0.48 sq mi (1.2 km^{2})

Population (2020)
  - Total: 2,836
  - Density: 5,900/sq mi (2,300/km^{2})
- ZIP code(s): Part of 63139
- Area code(s): 314
- Website: stlouis-mo.gov

Clifton Heights is a neighborhood of St. Louis, Missouri located near the southwest border of the city and highlighted by a park—Clifton Heights Park (38.6143°N 90.2916°W)—with a playground and a lake. Bounded on the west and north by I-44, on the east by Hampton Avenue, and on the south by Arsenal Street, Clifton Heights is in the 4th ward of the City of St. Louis. Its current representative on the city's Board of Aldermen is Bret Narayan. Its adjacent neighborhoods are Ellendale to the north and west, the Hill and Southwest Garden to the east, and Lindenwood Park to the south.

The neighborhood is mostly residential, with houses of styles that include Queen Anne, bungalow, Colonial Revival, American Foursquare, Prairie School, and Tudor Revival. The curving streets surrounding the park and the hills that slope downward toward I-44 are somewhat unusual for St. Louis and give the neighborhood a distinctive appearance.

== History ==
The area that now constitutes Clifton Heights was a relatively small part of an approximately 3-mile by 3-mile tract of land called the Gratiot League Square, which was granted to the Swiss-born merchant Charles Gratiot in 1798. Gratiot had requested the land grant in 1785 from the authorities of New Spain, who then governed the region, so that he could "establish a habitation on the River des Peres, to cultivate wheat, hemp, corn, tobacco, etc., etc." This land was relatively remote from the village of St. Louis, which then consisted of only a few dozen structures along the Mississippi riverfront and common land that extended a couple of miles to the west and south. After the 1803 Louisiana Purchase, Gratiot’s ownership of the land was recognized by the U.S. government in its process of reviewing the Spanish land grants.

The land in present-day Clifton Heights retained its rural character until the middle of the 19th century, when the arrival of railroads and the discovery of coal and clay deposits transformed much of the area. While these mines and factories may be more closely associated with the Dogtown neighborhoods and the Hill, some were established within Clifton Heights as well. In 1851, ground was broken in St. Louis for the Pacific Railroad, using land granted to the newly formed company by the state of Missouri. As construction of the railroad proceeded westward along the valley of the River des Peres, trains began running in 1853 along roughly the northwestern boundary of present-day Clifton Heights.

The development of Clifton Heights as a residential neighborhood took off in the 1880s. An 1876 map shows just a handful of streets in present-day Clifton Heights. By 1884, the area was served by streetcars along Arsenal Street to the south and (New) Manchester Road to the north.

A major catalyst of this development in the northern part of the neighborhood was a community of Methodists led by Benjamin St. James Fry. The group hired the Prussian-born surveyor and city planner Julius Pitzman in 1885 to lay out their subdivision, which covered an area listed by the Recorder of Deeds as D. W Graham’s Sulphur Springs Tract. (Pitzman's work also influenced the development of several other St. Louis neighborhoods.) The construction included a Methodist church on Clifton Avenue, which was named the Fry Memorial Methodist Episcopal Church after Fry’s death in 1892. The church on that site, which was built in the early 20th century after the original church burned, was sold to private owners in 2004 and is now a boutique inn.

Commercial buildings began to appear in the neighborhood by the turn of the 20th century. One example is the Clifton Pointe Building at the corner of Columbia Avenue and Clifton Avenue, which was built between 1903 and 1907. At the time of a 1991 survey by the Landmarks Association of St. Louis, a Rexall Drugs store occupied the building. As of 2025, this building is home to a hair salon and law office.

In the 1920s and 1930s, another wave of home building occurred. Based on information from building permits, scores of Clifton Heights homes were constructed during this period by local builder Harry C. Vollmar. Vollmar’s family had lived in the neighborhood since at least 1910. Census records show that his father was working as a grocer and the family was living at 6202 Columbia Avenue (site of the Clifton Pointe building). In 1920, Vollmar and his wife were living with her family on Clifton Avenue and in 1930 on Simpson Avenue.

The last part of Clifton Heights to be developed for residential use was the Clifton Hills subdivision north of Southwest Avenue and west of Tamm Avenue in the 1940s and 1950s. When Interstate 44 was built in St. Louis in the 1950s and 1960s, about 50 of the neighborhood's houses ended up confined between the new highway and the railroad tracks, and a small park called Frisco Park was effectively eliminated.

In 1991, the Landmarks Association of St. Louis conducted a survey to assess the historical significance of the architecture within the neighborhood. Their 455-page survey provides descriptions and photos of many individual homes and other buildings in Clifton Heights.

== Institutions and organizations ==
The Clifton Heights Neighborhood Association holds several annual events in the 4.4-acre park, including an Easter egg hunt, fall festival, and candy cane hunt. In 2018, the City of St. Louis released a plan to guide future improvements to the park. The plan prioritizes repairing infrastructure, restoring the park's Victorian character, and improving the park's functionality (particularly in terms of accessibility).

Clifton Heights is home to Mason School of Academic & Cultural Literacy, a school in the St. Louis Public School system serving pre-K to 6th grade students. The school teaches through project-based learning and maintains partnerships with organizations including the Saint Louis Art Museum and the local arts organization Center of Creative Arts (COCA). As of 2017, about half of Mason's students live outside the school's neighborhood boundaries but attend it by choice. Former U.S. Representative Richard Gephardt grew up on Reber Place and attended the school when it was known as Mason Elementary.

The neighborhood has numerous small businesses, an AMVETS post, and a Drury Inn and Suites. The construction of this hotel at the intersection of I-44 and Hampton Avenue was the subject of much neighborhood controversy regarding the demolition of homes and the placement of the large hotel next to small houses.

Clifton Heights is served by the 30 Arsenal bus and 90 Hampton bus in the greater St. Louis region's Metro Transit system. Other nearby routes include the 16 City Limits bus, with a stop at Arsenal and Jamieson, and the 31 Chouteau bus, with a stop at Hampton and Manchester. The closest MetroLink stop is Shrewsbury-Lansdowne I-44 on the Blue Line.

== Demographics ==
Historical population
Census	Pop.	Note	%±
1990	4,130		—
2000	3,485		−15.6%
2010	3,074		−11.8%
2020	2,836		−7.7%

In 2020, Clifton Height's racial makeup was 86.2% White, 3.9% Black, 0.1% Native American, 2.3% Asian, 5.8% Two or More Races, and 1.6% Some Other Race. 3.3% of the population was of Hispanic or Latino origin.

As of April 2025, median household income in Clifton Heights was $76,297, the median home value was $215,988, and the median rent was $1,227.
