= Vandeventer, St. Louis =

Neighborhood of St. Louis in Missouri, US

Coordinates: 38.6502°N 90.2430°W

Vandeventer
- Neighborhood of St. Louis
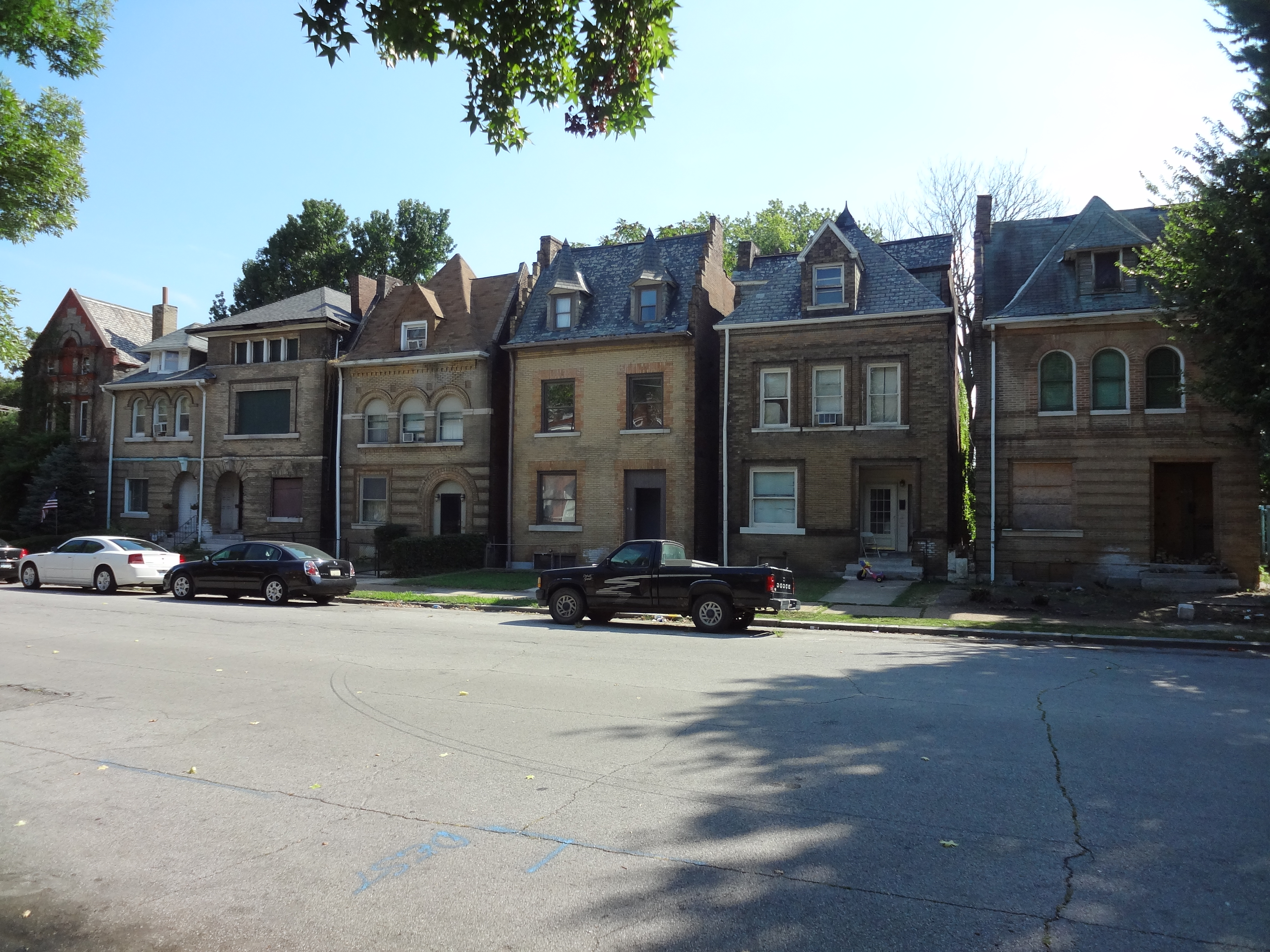
- Houses on Cook Avenue, Vandeventer, August 2011

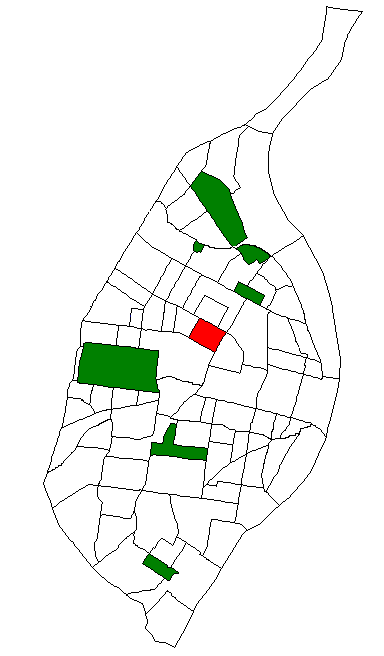
- Location (red) of Vandeventer within St. Louis
- Country: United States
- State: Missouri
- City: St. Louis
- Wards: 9, 12

Government
  - Aldermen: Sharon Tyus, Michael Browning

Area
  - Total: 0.47 sq mi (1.2 km^{2})

Population (2020)
  - Total: 2,041
  - Density: 4,300/sq mi (1,700/km^{2})
- ZIP code(s): Parts of 63106, 63113
- Area code(s): 314
- Website: stlouis-mo.gov

Vandeventer is a neighborhood of St. Louis, Missouri. The area is bounded by Dr. Martin Luther King Drive on the North, Delmar Boulevard on the South, Vandeventer Avenue on the East, and Newstead Avenue on the West.

== History ==
The founder, Peter Lewis Vandeventer, came to St. Louis in the 1860s with brothers William and Henry Barnum Vandeventer. Peter Lewis Vandeventer and Henry Barnum Vandeventer were Wall Street stockbrokers with a firm located at 6 Wall St., New York City. They made their money from selling stocks and took the train west to St. Louis to invest it inland.

Peter Lewis Vandeventer died in 1879, during the development of Vandeventer Place, a gated, luxurious private place in the neighborhood with stately mansions and a beautiful fountain as its centerpiece. His Missouri estate was managed by several corrupt lawyers, who stole much of the money from the sale of the lots at Vandeventer Place. His family remained in St. Louis for some time after his death, living in Vandeventer Place in a large mansion.

Vandeventer Place met with its demise in 1947, when the eastern half was demolished for the Veterans' Administration's new hospital. The western portion was demolished about ten years later, when the City acquired it as the site for a children's detention home. The fountain and east gates survive in Forest Park.

== Demographics ==
In 2020 Vandeventer's racial makeup was 88.9% black, 4.8% white, 0.5% Asian, 0.4% American Indian, 3.9% two or more races, and 0.5% some other race. 1.9% of the people were of Hispanic or Latino origin.

Historical population
Year	Pop.	±%
1990	3,480	—
2000	2,209	−36.5%
2010	1,682	−23.9%
2020	2,041	+21.3%
