= Parkview, St. Louis =

Historic area of St. Louis, Missouri, US

- Parkview Historic District
- U.S. National Register of Historic Places
- U.S. Historic district
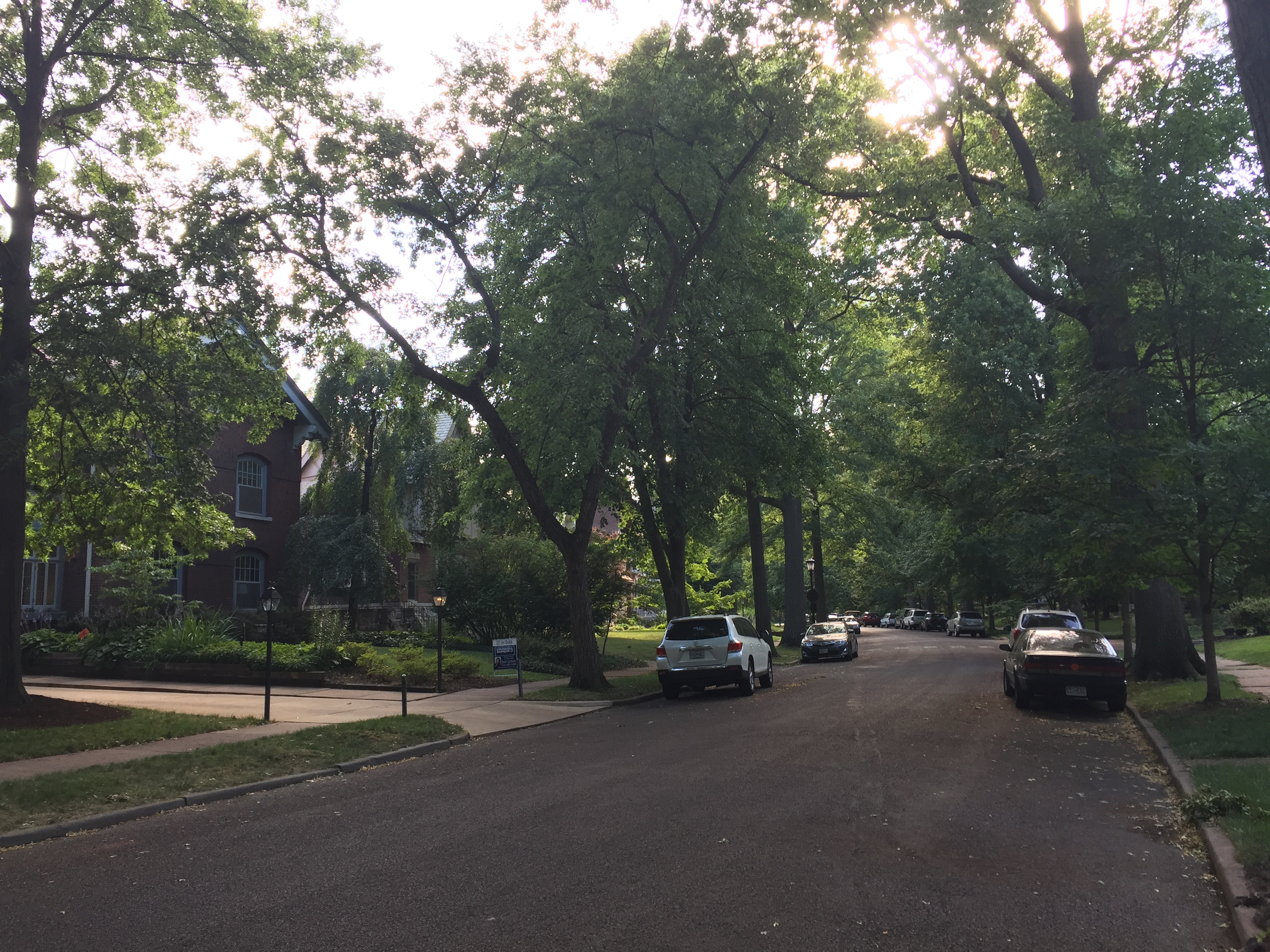

- Location within St. Louis Location within Missouri Location within the United States
- Location: University City, Missouri
- Coordinates: 38°39′10″N 90°18′11″W
- Architect: Otto J. Boehmer and others
- Architectural style: Late 19th and Early 20th Century American Movements, Late 19th and 20th Century Revivals, Renaissance
- NRHP reference No.: 86000788
- Added to NRHP: March 14, 1986

Parkview, also known as a "Saint Louis Urban Oasis," is a historic, private subdivision of St. Louis, Missouri. It is partly within the city limits of St. Louis and partly in University City. It is bounded by the Skinker-DeBaliviere neighborhood to the east, the Delmar Loop to the north, the Ames Place section of University City to the west, Washington University in St. Louis to the south, and Forest Park to the southeast.

== History ==
Parkview street

Much of the land that became Parkview was, in the mid-19th century, contained in the Kingsbury Farm. In 1905, surveyor Julius Pitzman, also the designer of Forest Park, was hired to lay out Parkview. Parkview was the largest and the last of the private neighborhoods designed by Julius Pitzman (he also designed Portland and Westmoreland Places and Compton Heights). His elegant design for the 70-acre (0.28 km^{2}) neighborhood includes a partly symmetrical arrangement of gently curved streets and parks. Curving streets in residential subdivisions was unusual for the period, and in Parkview they were “soothing and peaceful” to the eye. They added privacy as the streets curve gently out of sight, and they diminished the monotony of the continuous building setback. By 1907 Parkview's first houses were under construction. By 1916, most of Parkview's 255 houses had been built. Most are 3-story brick homes and many are architecturally striking; included are several excellent examples of Colonial Revival style and of Arts and Crafts architecture. In 1986, the neighborhood was accepted into the National Register of Historic Places under the name of "Parkview Historic District."

Over the years, a large number of notable St. Louisans have made their home in Parkview. The list includes Missouri Governor Henry Caulfield; St. Louis mayor Bernard Dickmann; University City mayors Heman, Flynn and Cunningham; artists Bessie Lowenhaupt, Aimee Schweig, Jane Pettus, Edmund Wuerpel and Gustav Goetch; writers Stanley Elkin and William Gass; aviation great General James (Jimmy) Doolittle; baseball players George Sisler and Bob Gibson; and film maker Charles Guggenheim. Today it is home to many writers, physicians, lawyers, scientists, and professors. It is considered a highly desirable residential area, and its homes routinely sell for over $800,000.
