= 2023 St. Louis aldermanic elections =

- March 7, 2023 and April 4, 2023

All 14 seats in the St. Louis Board of Aldermen 8 seats needed for a majority

The 2023 St. Louis aldermanic elections were held in two rounds, with nonpartisan blanket approval voting primaries on March 7 and general elections on April 4. All 14 members of the St. Louis Board of Aldermen and the President of the Board of Aldermen were elected. These were the first elections held after Proposition R (2012) came into effect, reducing the number of alderpersons from 28 to 14.

Numerous incumbent alderpersons ran in the newly drawn 14 wards. (Note: 18 of the 27 incumbents filed to run for re-election. Two seats (wards 6 and 15) were vacant. Another incumbent, Dwinderlin Evans, failed to qualify for the primary ballot and withdrew from the 12th ward election early on. Four incumbents were eliminated in the March 7 primaries: Brandon Bosley (3rd) ran in the 14th ward; Mike Gras (28th) ran in the 9th ward; Lisa Middlebrook (2nd) ran in the 3th ward; James Page (4th) ran in the 14th ward; Two incumbents were defeated by fellow incumbents in the April 4 general election: Joe Vaccaro (23rd), defeated by Bret Narayan (24th) in the 4th ward; Norma Walker (22nd), defeated by Pamela Boyd (27th) in the 13th ward; One incumbent, Tina Pihl (17th), was defeated by a non-incumbent candidate (Michael Browning) in the 9th ward. Overall, 10 of the 18 incumbent candidates were re-elected to the Board.) Some local media outlets used the term "Aldergeddon" in reference to the competitive nature of several incumbents running against each other. Winning candidates in even-numbered wards were elected to four-year terms and winning candidates in odd-numbered wards were elected to two-year terms.

Incumbent Board President Megan Green, a progressive who was first elected in a 2022 special election after the resignation of Lewis Reed, was re-elected to a full four-year term unopposed. Progressive candidates ideologically affiliated with Green and Mayor Tishaura Jones won a majority of seats on the Board.

== President of the Board of Aldermen ==
=== Declared ===
- Megan Green, incumbent president of the board of aldermen (2022–present) and former 15th ward alderwoman (2014–22)

=== Declined ===
- Sharon Tyus, incumbent 1st ward alderwoman (2013–present) and former 20th ward alderwoman (1991–2003)

=== Results ===
March 7, 2023 President of the Board of Aldermen primary election
Party	Candidate	Votes	%
Nonpartisan	Megan Green (incumbent)	17,177	69.2%
Total votes		17,177	69.2%

April 4, 2023 President of the Board of Aldermen general election
Party	Candidate	Votes	%
Nonpartisan	Megan Green (incumbent)	24,939	89.0%
Write-in		3,070	11.0%
Total votes		28,009	100%

== Board of Aldermen ==
=== Ward 1 ===
Located on the southern extreme of the city limits, the 1st ward partially or entirely covers the neighborhoods of Patch, Boulevard Heights, Carondelet, and Bevo Mill. Since 2021, this area had been represented by 13th ward Alderwoman Anne Schweitzer, who defeated incumbent Beth Murphy.

==== Declared ====
- Tony Kirchner, sheriff deputy
- Matthew Kotraba, insurance agent and 13th ward Republican committeeman
- Anne Schweitzer, incumbent 13th ward alderwoman (2021–2023)

==== Declined ====
- Bill Stephens, incumbent 12th ward alderman (2021–2023)

==== Endorsements ====
Anne Schweitzer

Local officials

- Megan Green, President of the Board of Aldermen (2022–present)

==== Results ====
March 7, 2023 Board of Aldermen primary election, 1st ward
Party	Candidate	Votes	%
Nonpartisan	Anne Schweitzer (incumbent)	1,173	53.6%
Nonpartisan	Tony Kirchner	1,088	49.7%
Nonpartisan	Matthew Kotraba	409	18.7%
Total votes		2,670	122.0%

April 4, 2023 Board of Aldermen general election, 1st ward
Party	Candidate	Votes	%
Nonpartisan	Anne Schweitzer (incumbent)	1,611	52.0%
Nonpartisan	Tony Kirchner	1,472	47.5%
Write-in		15	0.5%
Total votes		3,098	100.0%

=== Ward 2 ===
Located in the city's southwest corner, the 2nd ward partially or entirely covers the neighborhoods of Boulevard Heights, Princeton Heights, and St. Louis Hills. Two incumbents represented areas of the new ward: Carol Howard (14th), Tom Oldenburg (16th). Only Oldenburg filed to run in the new 2nd ward.

==== Declared ====
- Katie Bellis, former member of the Capital Committee's Citizen Advisory Committee from Princeton Heights
- Phil Menendez, former St. Louis Metropolitan Police Department officer from St. Louis Hills (Republican)
- Tom Oldenburg, incumbent 16th ward alderman (2017–2023)

==== Declined ====
- Carol Howard, incumbent 14th ward alderwoman (2010–2023)

==== Results ====
March 7, 2023 Board of Aldermen primary election, 2nd ward
Party	Candidate	Votes	%
Nonpartisan	Tom Oldenburg (incumbent)	1,597	59.3%
Nonpartisan	Phil Menendez	971	36.0%
Nonpartisan	Katie Bellis	755	28.0%
Total votes		3,323	123.3%

April 4, 2023 Board of Aldermen general election, 2nd ward
Party	Candidate	Votes	%
Nonpartisan	Tom Oldenburg (incumbent)	2,199	59.7%
Nonpartisan	Phil Menendez	1,437	39.0%
Write-in		46	1.3%
Total votes		3,682	100.0%

=== Ward 3 ===
The 3rd ward is located in the southeast of the city, anchored in the Dutchtown neighborhood. Incumbent 25th ward alderman Shane Cohn was the only candidate in this ward.

==== Declared ====
- Shane Cohn, incumbent 25th ward alderman (2009–2023)

==== Endorsements ====
Shane Cohn

Local officials

- Megan Green, President of the Board of Aldermen (2022–present)

==== Results ====
March 7, 2023 Board of Aldermen primary election, 3rd ward
Party	Candidate	Votes	%
Nonpartisan	Shane Cohn (incumbent)	410	79.6%
Total votes		410	79.6%

April 4, 2023 Board of Aldermen general election, 3rd ward
Party	Candidate	Votes	%
Nonpartisan	Shane Cohn (incumbent)	823	94.0%
Write-in		53	6.0%
Total votes		876	100.0%

=== Ward 4 ===
The 4th ward is located on the city's western edge, south of Forest Park and extending through the Hi-Pointe, Ellendale, and Lindenwood Park neighborhoods, including the area known as Dogtown. Incumbent aldermen Bret Narayan (24th) and Joe Vaccaro (23rd) both ran in this ward.

==== Declared ====
- Bret Narayan, incumbent 24th ward alderman (2019–2023)
- Casey Otto, freelance photographer from Clifton Heights, son of former state representative Bill Otto
- Joe Vaccaro, incumbent 23rd ward alderman (2009–2023)

==== Endorsements ====
Bret Narayan

Local officials

- Megan Green, President of the Board of Aldermen (2022–present)

==== Results ====
March 7, 2023 Board of Aldermen primary election, 4th ward
Party	Candidate	Votes	%
Nonpartisan	Joe Vaccaro (incumbent)	1,391	53.6%
Nonpartisan	Bret Narayan (incumbent)	1,356	52.2%
Nonpartisan	Casey Otto	220	8.5%
Total votes		2,967	114.2%

April 4, 2023 Board of Aldermen general election, 4th ward
Party	Candidate	Votes	%
Nonpartisan	Bret Narayan (incumbent)	2,230	54.6%
Nonpartisan	Joe Vaccaro (incumbent)	1,842	45.1%
Write-in		13	0.3%
Total votes		4,085	100%

=== Ward 5 ===
The 5th ward covers The Hill, Southwest Garden, and North Hampton neighborhoods. Incumbent 10th ward alderman and former interim Board President Joe Vollmer ran in this ward.

==== Declared ====
- Helen Petty, owner of ChopShop salon in Forest Park Southeast
- Joe Vollmer, incumbent 10th ward alderman, former interim President of the Board of Aldermen (2022), and owner of Milo's Bocce Garden in The Hill

==== Results ====
March 7, 2023 Board of Aldermen primary election, 5th ward
Party	Candidate	Votes	%
Nonpartisan	Joe Vollmer (incumbent)	1,533	64.2%
Nonpartisan	Helen Petty	990	41.5%
Total votes		2,523	105.7%

April 4, 2023 Board of Aldermen general election, 5th ward
Party	Candidate	Votes	%
Nonpartisan	Joe Vollmer (incumbent)	2,172	57.8%
Nonpartisan	Helen Petty	1,575	41.9%
Write-in		8	0.2%
Total votes		3,755	100.0%

=== Ward 6 ===
The south-central 6th ward is anchored around Tower Grove Park, covering the Shaw, Tower Grove South, and Compton Heights neighborhoods. Annie Rice, who represented the 8th ward in Shaw, declined to run in this district. The 15th ward, centered on Tower Grove South, was Board President Megan Green's former seat.

==== Declared ====
- Jennifer Florida, former St. Louis Recorder of Deeds (2014) and 15th ward alderwoman (2001–2014)
- Daniela Velazquez, public relations executive at FleishmanHillard

==== Withdrawn ====
- Megan Green, incumbent president of the board of aldermen (2022–present) and former 15th ward alderwoman (2014–2022) (endorsed Velazquez)

==== Declined ====
- Annie Rice, incumbent 8th ward alderwoman (2018–2023) (endorsed Velazquez)

==== Endorsements ====
Daniela Velazquez

Local officials

- Megan Green, President of the Board of Aldermen (2022–present)

==== Results ====
March 7, 2023 Board of Aldermen primary election, 6th ward
Party	Candidate	Votes	%
Nonpartisan	Daniela Velazquez	1,243	66.3%
Nonpartisan	Jennifer Florida	750	40.0%
Total votes		1,993	106.4%

April 4, 2023 Board of Aldermen general election, 6th ward
Party	Candidate	Votes	%
Nonpartisan	Daniela Velazquez	2,108	65.1%
Nonpartisan	Jennifer Florida	1,113	34.4%
Write-in		15	0.5%
Total votes		3,236	100.0%

=== Ward 7 ===
The 7th ward covers Tower Grove East, Benton Park West, and the Gate District neighborhoods. The seat was open, as 6th ward Christine Ingrassia resigned in February 2023 to accept a position in Board President Megan Green's office. She had previously announced that she would not run for re-election.

==== Declared ====
- Jon-Pierre Mitchom
- Cedric L. Redmon Jr., musician
- Alisha Sonnier, member of the St. Louis Public School Board

==== Declined ====
- Christine Ingrassia, former 6th ward alderwoman (2013–2023) (endorsed Sonnier)

==== Endorsements ====
Alisha Sonnier

Local officials

- Megan Green, President of the Board of Aldermen (2022–present)
- Christine Ingrassia, former 6th ward alderwoman (2013-23)

==== Results ====
March 7, 2023 Board of Aldermen primary election, 7th ward
Party	Candidate	Votes	%
Nonpartisan	Alisha Sonnier	1,108	60.8%
Nonpartisan	J. P. Mitchom	731	40.1%
Nonpartisan	Cedric Redmon	643	35.3%
Total votes		2,482	136.2%

April 4, 2023 Board of Aldermen general election, 7th ward
Party	Candidate	Votes	%
Nonpartisan	Alisha Sonnier	1,465	60.6%
Nonpartisan	J. P. Mitchom	930	38.5%
Write-in		11	0.91%
Total votes		2,417	100.0%

=== Ward 8 ===
The 8th ward covers parts of Downtown St. Louis, Soulard, and Benton Park. Incumbent 20th ward alderwoman Cara Spencer ran for re-election in this ward, while incumbent aldermen Dan Guenther (9th) and Jack Coatar (7th) declined to run.

==== Declared ====
- Shedrick Kelley, 7th ward aldermanic candidate in 2021
- Ken Ortmann, former 9th ward alderman (1999–2017) and 9th ward aldermanic candidate in 2021
- Cara Spencer, incumbent 20th ward alderwoman (2015–2023) and 2021 mayoral candidate

==== Declined ====
- Jack Coatar, incumbent 7th ward alderman (2015–2023)
- Dan Guenther, incumbent 9th ward alderman (2017–2023)

==== Results ====
March 7, 2023 Board of Aldermen primary election, 8th ward
Party	Candidate	Votes	%
Nonpartisan	Cara Spencer (incumbent)	1,469	73.9%
Nonpartisan	Ken Ortmann	585	29.4%
Nonpartisan	Shedrick Kelley	506	25.4%
Total votes		2,560	128.7%

April 4, 2023 Board of Aldermen general election, 8th ward
Party	Candidate	Votes	%
Nonpartisan	Cara Spencer (incumbent)	1,795	77.1%
Nonpartisan	Ken Ortmann	517	22.2%
Write-in		15	0.6%
Total votes		2,327	100.0%

=== Ward 9 ===
The 9th ward is located in the city's central corridor, east and southeast of Forest Park and covering the populous Central West End and Forest Park Southeast, the latter of which includes the Grove. Two incumbents ran in this ward: Tina "Sweet-T" Pihl (17th) and Michael J. Gras (28th).

In the initial unofficial results, incumbent alderpersons Tina Pihl and Mike Gras both received 868 votes, making it unclear who would advance to the general election against Michael Browning, who came in first. After absentee and provisional ballots were counted, Pihl surpassed Gras by 8 votes.

==== Declared ====
- Michael Browning
- Michael J. Gras, incumbent 28th ward alderman
- Tina "Sweet-T" Pihl, incumbent 17th ward alderwoman

==== Results ====
March 7, 2023 Board of Aldermen primary election, 9th ward
Party	Candidate	Votes	%
Nonpartisan	Michael Browning	1,007	49.8%
Nonpartisan	Tina Pihl (incumbent)	876	43.3%
Nonpartisan	Mike Gras (incumbent)	868	42.9%
Total votes		2,751	135.9%

April 4, 2023 Board of Aldermen general election, 9th ward
Party	Candidate	Votes	%
Nonpartisan	Michael Browning	1,771	63.1%
Nonpartisan	Tina Phil (incumbent)	1,021	36.4%
Write-in		13	0.5%
Total votes		2,805	100.0%

=== Ward 10 ===
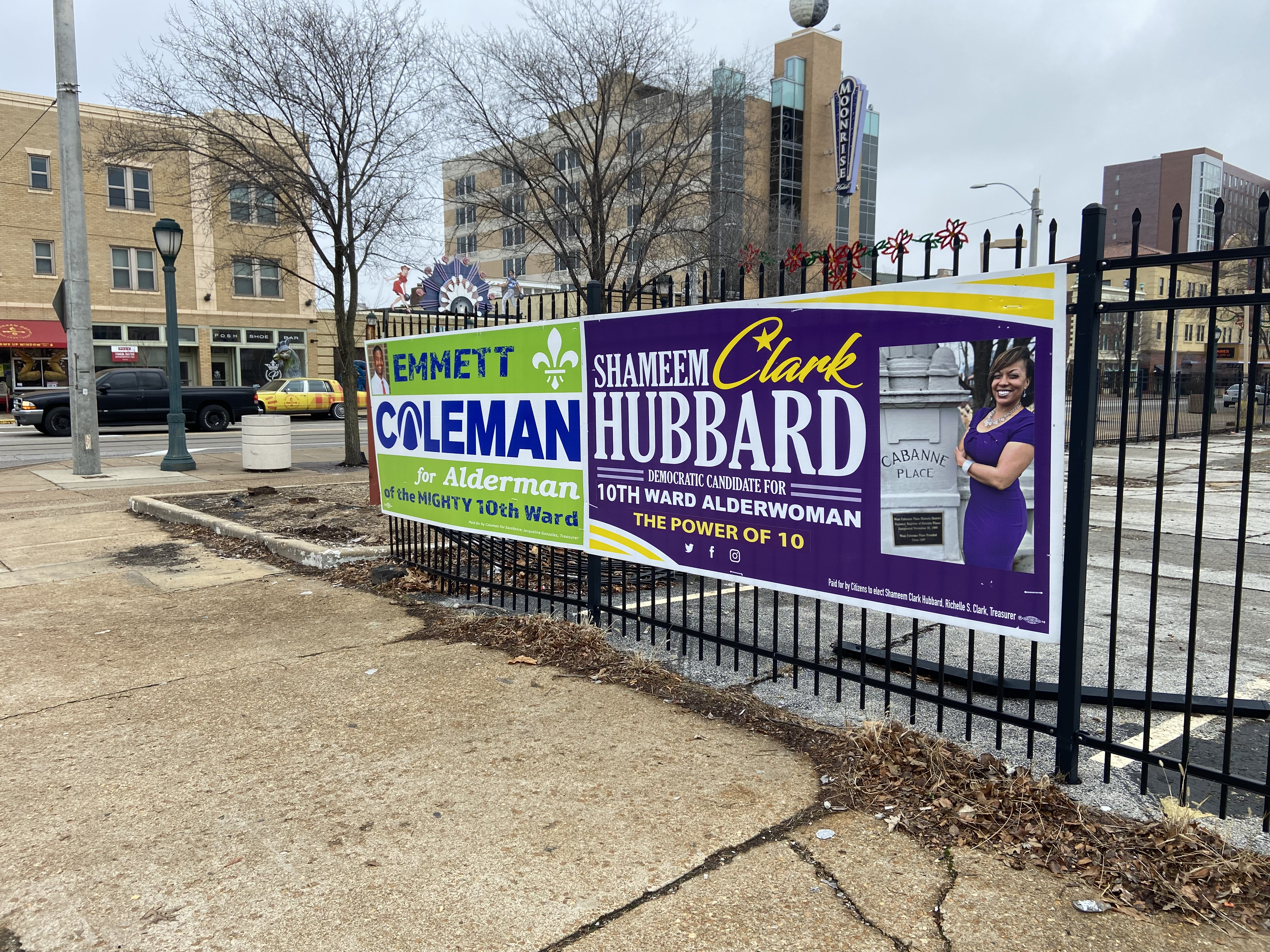
Campaign signage at Skinker and Delmar.

The 10th ward is located on the city's western central edge, including Forest Park and the neighborhoods of Skinker-DeBaliviere and West End. Incumbent 26th ward alderwoman Shameem Clark Hubbard ran for re-election in this ward.

==== Declared ====
- Shameem Clark Hubbard, incumbent 26th ward alderwoman (2019–2023)
- Emmett L. Coleman, businessman

==== Endorsements ====
Shameem Clark Hubbard

Local officials

- Megan Green, President of the Board of Aldermen (2022–present)

==== Results ====
March 7, 2023 Board of Aldermen primary election, 10th ward
Party	Candidate	Votes	%
Nonpartisan	Shameem Clark-Hubbard (incumbent)	833	61.3%
Nonpartisan	Emmett Coleman	654	48.1%
Total votes		1,487	109.3%

April 4, 2023 Board of Aldermen general election, 10th ward
Party	Candidate	Votes	%
Nonpartisan	Shameem Clark-Hubbard (incumbent)	1,163	53.2%
Nonpartisan	Emmett Coleman	1,021	46.7%
Write-in		4	0.2%
Total votes		2,188	100.0%

=== Ward 11 ===
The 11th ward runs from central north city (including O'Fallon and JeffVanderLou) down to Midtown in the central corridor. Incumbent 21st ward alderwoman Laura Keys, who was elected in a 2022 special election after the resignation of John Collins-Muhammad, ran for re-election in this ward.

==== Declared ====
- Laura Keys, incumbent 21st ward alderwoman (2022–2023)
- Carla "Coffee" Wright, perennial candidate and U.S. Senate candidate in 2018 and 2022

==== Withdrawn candidates ====
- Marlene Davis, incumbent 19th ward alderwoman (2007–2023)

==== Results ====
March 7, 2023 Board of Aldermen primary election, 11th ward
Party	Candidate	Votes	%
Nonpartisan	Laura Keys (incumbent)	568	69.9%
Nonpartisan	Carla Wright	312	38.4%
Total votes		880	108.2%

April 4, 2023 Board of Aldermen general election, 11t ward
Party	Candidate	Votes	%
Nonpartisan	Laura Keys (incumbent)	781	69.4%
Nonpartisan	Carla Wright	335	29.8%
Write-in		9	0.8%
Total votes		1,125	100.0%

=== Ward 12 ===
The 12th ward covers a broad area of north city, including the neighborhoods of Penrose and The Ville. There are five active candidates running in this ward, the most in this cycle. Incumbent alderwoman Sharon Tyus (1st) ran for re-election in this ward, despite previously speculating that she "might" challenge Megan Green for board president.

==== Declared ====
- Yolanda Brown
- Darron Collins-Bey
- Tashara Earl
- Walter Rush
- Sharon Tyus, incumbent 1st ward alderwoman (2013–2023) and former 20th ward alderwoman (1991–2003)

==== Withdrawn candidate ====
- Dwinderlin Evans, incumbent 4th ward alderwoman (2020–2023)

==== Endorsements ====
Tashara Earl

Local officials

- Megan Green, President of the Board of Aldermen (2022–present)

==== Results ====
March 7, 2023 Board of Aldermen primary election, 12th ward
Party	Candidate	Votes	%
Nonpartisan	Sharon Tyus (incumbent)	1,004	63.0%
Nonpartisan	Tashara Earl	567	35.6%
Nonpartisan	Yolanda Brown	471	29.6%
Nonpartisan	Darron Collins-Bey	226	14.2%
Nonpartisan	Walter Rush	116	7.3%
Total votes		2,384	149.7%

April 4, 2023 Board of Aldermen general election, 12th ward
Party	Candidate	Votes	%
Nonpartisan	Sharon Tyus (incumbent)	1,074	55.3%
Nonpartisan	Tashara Earl	858	44.2%
Write-in		9	0.5%
Total votes		1,941	100.0%

=== Ward 13 ===
The 13th ward covers the northern extreme of the city limits, including the neighborhoods Baden, Riverfront, and North Riverfront. It is the largest of the 14 wards by area. Three incumbents ran for re-election in this ward: Pamela Boyd (27th), Lisa Middlebrook (2nd), and Norma Walker (22nd). It is the only election this cycle in which all candidates are incumbents.

==== Declared ====
- Pamela Boyd, incumbent 27th ward alderwoman (2017–2023)
- Lisa Middlebrook, incumbent 2nd ward alderwoman (2017–2023)
- Norma Walker, incumbent 22nd ward alderwoman (2022–2023)

==== Results ====
March 7, 2023 Board of Aldermen primary election, 13th ward
Party	Candidate	Votes	%
Nonpartisan	Pamela Boyd (incumbent)	751	54.3%
Nonpartisan	Norma Walker (incumbent)	506	36.6%
Nonpartisan	Lisa Middlebrook (incumbent)	390	28.3%
Total votes		1,647	119.1%

April 4, 2023 Board of Aldermen general election, 13th ward
Party	Candidate	Votes	%
Nonpartisan	Pamela Boyd (incumbent)	978	54.0%
Nonpartisan	Norma Walker (incumbent)	827	45.7%
Write-in		6	0.3%
Total votes		1,811	100.0%

=== Ward 14 ===
The 14th ward covers part of Downtown, Downtown West, St. Louis Place, and Hyde Park. Incumbent aldermen Brandon Bosley (3rd) and James Page (5th) ran for re-election in this district. State representative Rasheen Aldridge also ran.

==== Declared ====
- Rasheen Aldridge, state representative from the 78th district (2020–2023)
- Brandon Bosley, incumbent 3rd ward alderman (2017–2023)
- James Page, incumbent 4th ward alderman (2021–2023)
- Ebony Washington, real estate agent

==== Endorsements ====
Rasheen Aldridge

Local officials

- Tishaura Jones, 47th Mayor of St. Louis (2021-present)
- Megan Green, President of the St. Louis Board of Aldermen (2022–present)
- Adam Layne, Treasurer of St. Louis (2021-present)
- Christine Ingrassia, former 6th ward alderwoman (2013-23)
- Dan Guenther, 9th ward alderman (2017-present)

State officials

- Marlon Anderson, 76th district state representative (2021-present)
- Kimberly-Ann Collins, 77th district state representative (2021-present)
- Donna Baringer, 82nd district state representative (2017-present)
- Steve Butz, 81st district state representative (2019-present)
- Raychel Proudie, 73rd district state representative (2019-present)
- Jamilah Nasheed, former 5th district state senator (2013-17) and 60th district state representative (2007-13)

==== Results ====
March 7, 2023 Board of Aldermen primary election, 14th ward
Party	Candidate	Votes	%
Nonpartisan	Ebony Washington	633	40.0%
Nonpartisan	Rasheen Aldridge	590	37.3%
Nonpartisan	Brandon Bosley (incumbent)	530	33.5%
Nonpartisan	James Page (incumbent)	376	23.8%
Total votes		2,129	134.5%

April 4, 2023 Board of Aldermen general election, 14th ward
Party	Candidate	Votes	%
Nonpartisan	Rasheen Aldridge	903	51.6%
Nonpartisan	Ebony Washington	827	47.2%
Write-in		21	1.2%
Total votes		1,751	100.0%
