= Princeton Heights, St. Louis =

Neighborhood of St. Louis in Missouri, US

Coordinates: 38.5745°N 90.2879°W

Princeton Heights
- Neighborhood of St. Louis
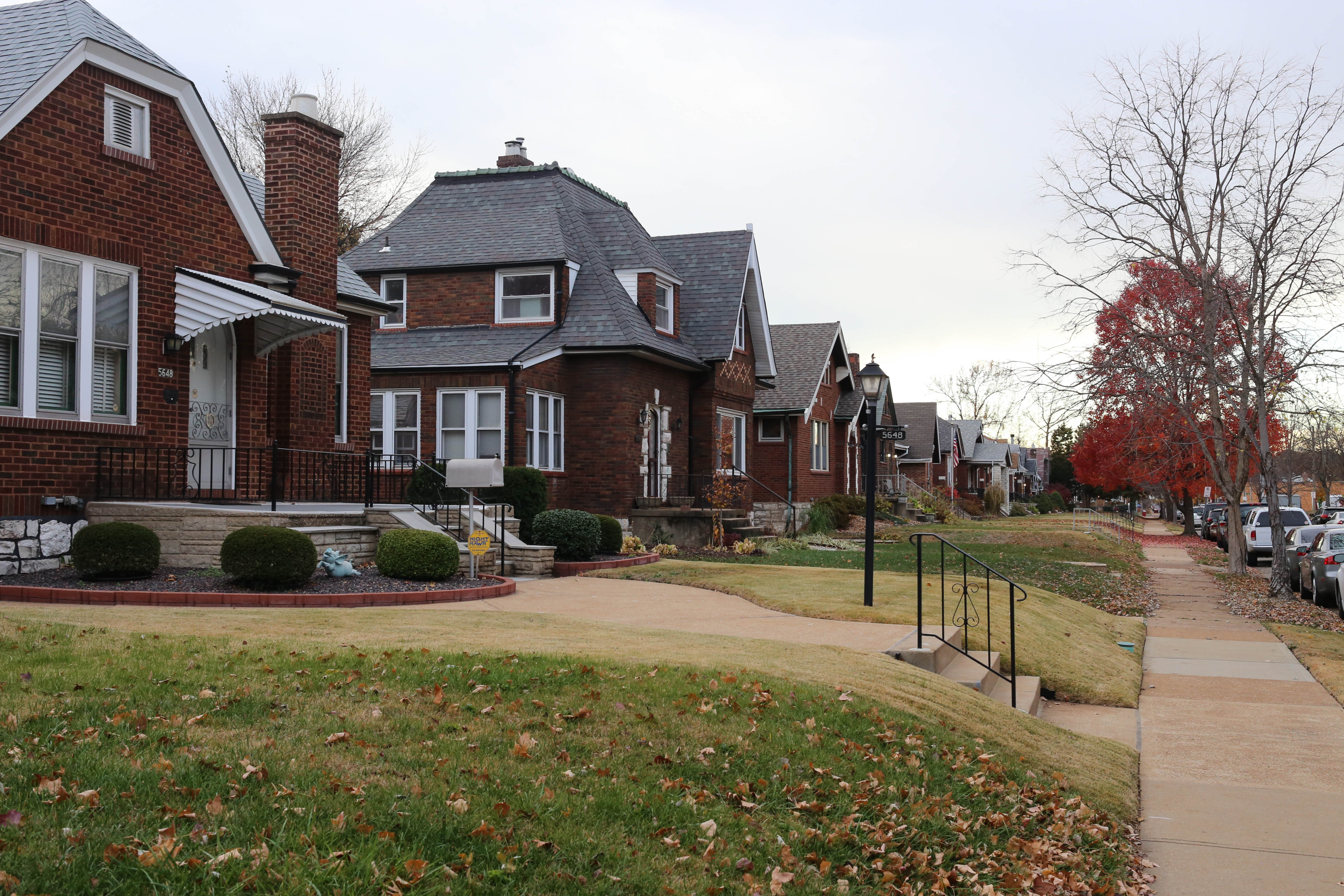
- Princeton Heights, November 2017

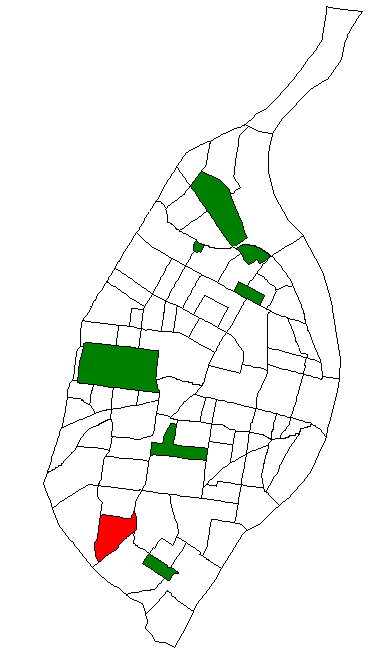
- Location (red) of Princeton Heights within St. Louis
- Country: United States
- State: Missouri
- City: St. Louis
- Wards: 2, 5

Government
  - Aldermen: Tom Oldenburg, Matt Devoti

Area
  - Total: 0.83 sq mi (2.1 km^{2})

Population (2020)
  - Total: 7,346
  - Density: 8,900/sq mi (3,400/km^{2})
- ZIP code(s): Parts of 63109, 63116
- Area code(s): 314
- Website: stlouis-mo.gov; princetonheightsneighborhood.org

Princeton Heights is a neighborhood of St. Louis, Missouri. The neighborhood boundaries are defined as Hampton Boulevard on the west, Eichelberger on the north, Christy Boulevard on the east, and Gravois on the south.

== Demographics ==
Historical population
Census	Pop.	Note	%±
1990	8,029		—
2000	8,238		2.6%
2010	7,619		−7.5%
2020	7,364		−3.3%

In 2020 Princeton Heights reported a population of 7,364. The racial makeup was 81.4% White, 7.4% Black, 0.2% Native American, 1.9% Asian, 7.4% Two or More Races, and 1.6% Some Other Race. 5.0% of the population was of Hispanic or Latino origin.

The Princeton Heights area is represented by the Board of Aldermen of the City of St. Louis.

== History ==
Princeton Heights is an older South St. Louis residential neighborhood. The name "Princeton" came from the old deeds from the neighborhood named Princeton Place Subdivision or Addition. Its outer edge on the west is rather closely paralleled by the River des Peres drainage works, whose valley creates a general downward slope to the west over much of the area. In earlier years Princeton Heights was drained by small creeks, one being Glaise Creek, which flowed into the River des Peres near the present location of Loughborough Avenue, south into the River des Peres ditch. Elsewhere the topography is quite rolling in character, with a high ridge crossing through the eastern portion of Kingshighway.

The area has long been transversed by those coming to or from the downtown area of St. Louis. Gravois Avenue began as a road to a salt spring and ferry, near present-day Fenton, around 1804. In 1839, an act of the State legislature made Gravois a state road and during the 1840s it was paved with a macadam surface. In 1914, Gravois Road became the first concrete highway in Missouri, when six miles were laid from the downtown area to Grant's Farm. Gravois became known as Missouri State Highway 30 in 1922.

During late 19th century, much of the area of Princeton Heights was farmland, and the area was known as "Gardenville". By the 1920s, most of the farmland was gone as housing developments and subdivisions emerged during the early urban sprawl of St. Louis. The Gardenville name lives on through a street name, school name, and the Gardenville Masonic Lodge in Affton.

== Architecture ==
Princeton Heights is a mixture of residential and commercial buildings with minimal industrial activity. Residences include single-family dwellings, multi-family dwellings, and apartment buildings. Like nearest neighborhoods St. Louis Hills, Holly Hills, and Southampton, most of the home construction is Arts and Crafts movement-inspired masonry and dates from the 1920s and 1930s. Architectural styles vary by street or by block, although most single-family homes could be classified as American craftsman-styled bungalows, storybook houses, or variations of American Foursquare.
