= Francis Park =

Park in St. Louis, Missouri

- Interactive map of Francis Park
- Type: Urban
- Coordinates: 38°35′06″N 90°18′05″W
- Area: 60.30 acres (24.40 ha)
- Authorized: 1916
- Public transit: MetroBus
- Website: St. Louis Parks

Francis Park is an urban park located in the St. Louis Hills neighborhood of St. Louis, Missouri, United States. Francis Park is located between Eichelberger Street, Nottingham Avenue, Donovan Avenue and Tamm Avenue.

The park was named for David Rowland Francis (1850-1927), who had been the President of the Louisiana Purchase Exposition, governor of Missouri and mayor of St. Louis (1885-1889), who donated 60 acres of land for the park as a gift to the city of St. Louis on Christmas Eve in 1916. In 2018, a 7 foot bronze sculpture of Francis by artist Harry Weber was dedicated.

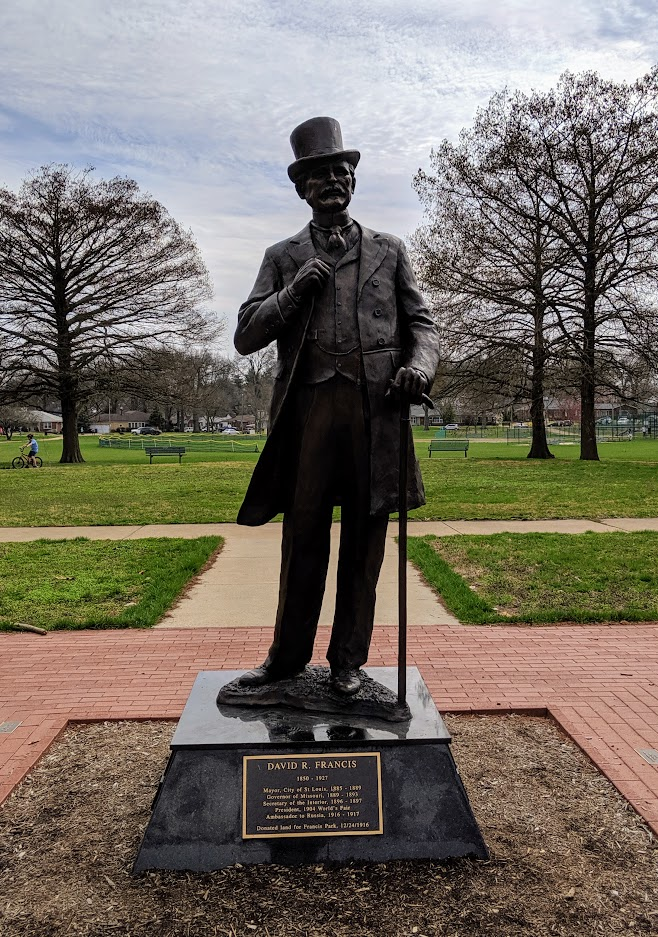
Statue of David R. Francis in Francis Park.

The park's amenities include handball, racquetball, and tennis courts; soccer and softball fields; and a playground.

The St. Louis Hills Neighborhood Association runs an art fair, 5k, and bike race as fundraisers for upkeep of the park.

== See also ==
- St. Louis Hills neighborhood
- Lindenwood Park neighborhood
