= Southampton, St. Louis =

Neighborhood of St. Louis in Missouri, US

Southampton
- Neighborhood of St. Louis
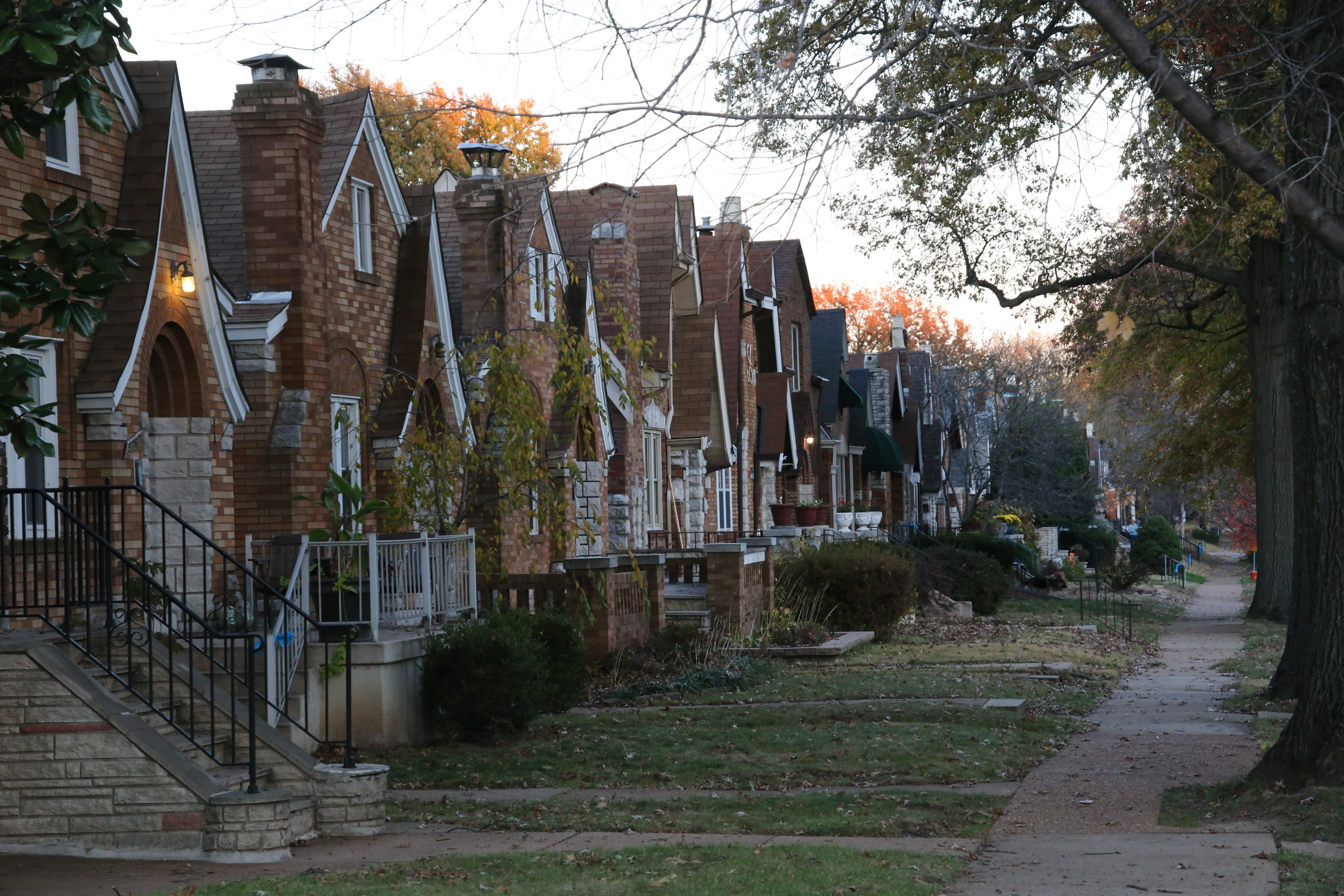
- Southampton, November 2015

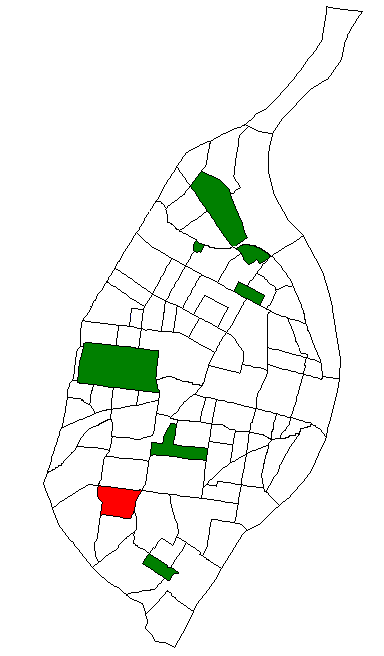
- Location (red) of Southampton within St. Louis
- Coordinates: 38.5869°N 90.2842°W
- Country: United States
- State: Missouri
- City: St. Louis
- Wards: 5

Government
  - Aldermen: Matt Devoti

Area
  - Total: 0.7 sq mi (1.8 km^{2})

Population (2020)
  - Total: 6,647
  - Density: 9,500/sq mi (3,700/km^{2})
- ZIP code(s): Part of 63109
- Area code(s): 314
- Website: stlouis-mo.gov http://southamptonstl.org/

Southampton is a neighborhood in St. Louis, Missouri. Located in the southwestern reaches of the city, its borders are Chippewa Street (Route 366) (formerly U.S. Route 66) on the north, Hampton Avenue on the west, Eichelberger Street on the south, and South Kingshighway Boulevard on the east.

== Description ==
This is a quiet neighborhood that was historically populated by German immigrants and their descendants of the early 20th century. Typical residential architectural styles include "Hansel and Gretel", Neo-Tudor, Arts & Crafts, and Foursquare bungalows. Although the earliest housing is dated from 1905 to 1915, most of the houses were built from the 1920s to the late 1930s and are primarily brick and stone. A portion of the neighborhood was platted by an Anglophile who named the streets and avenues (Devonshire, Lansdowne, Nottingham, Sutherland) after English (and one Scottish) locations. The neighborhood contains the only alley in the city divided by a median (it runs one block between Chippewa Street and Winona Avenue from Macklind to Brannon avenues, the median being at one time part of the track for a privately owned rail line).

Since the 1990s, a generation of new, younger residents have moved into the neighborhood, including artists and craftsmen. The area has a low crime rate and has traditionally been home to a large number of firefighters and police officers, as a result of a Saint Louis regulation requiring city employees to live within the city limits. Many new owners are middle class and upper middle class; property values rose after 2003.

Southampton is located near many Saint Louis attractions. It is nine miles from downtown and the Saint Louis Arch. Forest Park (home of the Saint Louis Zoo, Saint Louis Art Museum, Missouri History Museum, and the Muny Theater) is just north on Hampton Avenue. The Missouri Botanical Garden is minutes away by car as well, to the north along Kingshighway. Grant's Farm is minutes south by car.

The Macklind Avenue Business District runs through the center of the neighborhood on Macklind from Devonshire Avenue to Eichelberger Street. There are many new businesses and small established businesses, including popular restaurants, delis, and bakeries. In addition to its regular exhibitions of local artists, SOHA gallery sponsors a community garden and hosts events to support the neighborhood, including art classes.

The Southampton Neighborhood Association is an active part of the community. It sponsored the group that built and controls the Southwest City Dog Park in Wilmore Park.

Southampton is divided into several Catholic parishes. Saint Mary Magdalen Catholic Church is located on South Kingshighway Boulevard at Bancroft Avenue in the northeast, with Saint Mary Magdelen School next to it at South Kingshighway Boulevard and Sutherland Avenue. Our Lady of Sorrows Catholic Church is on Rhodes Avenue at South Kingshighway Boulevard, and its parish boundaries contain the southeast portion of the neighborhood. From Wherry and January avenues westward, the area is served by Saint Gabriel the Archangel Church, located at Nottingham and Tamm avenues in the nearby neighborhood of Saint Louis Hills.

Within the neighborhood are also Hope Lutheran Church on Neosho Street and Kingshighway Baptist Church on South Kingshighway Boulevard at Eichelberger Street.

The public grade school that serves the area is Buder Elementary School. The Buder Branch Library is located on Hampton south of Chippewa Street.

== Demographics ==
Historical population
Census	Pop.	Note	%±
1990	8,854		—
2000	7,793		−12.0%
2010	6,904		−11.4%
2020	6,647		−3.7%

In 2020 Southampton's racial makeup was 82.0% White, 8.6% Black, 0.4% Native American, 1.7% Asian, 5.9% Two or More Races, and 1.4% Some Other Race. 4.4% of the population was of Hispanic or Latino origin.
