= Megan Green =

American politician and educator

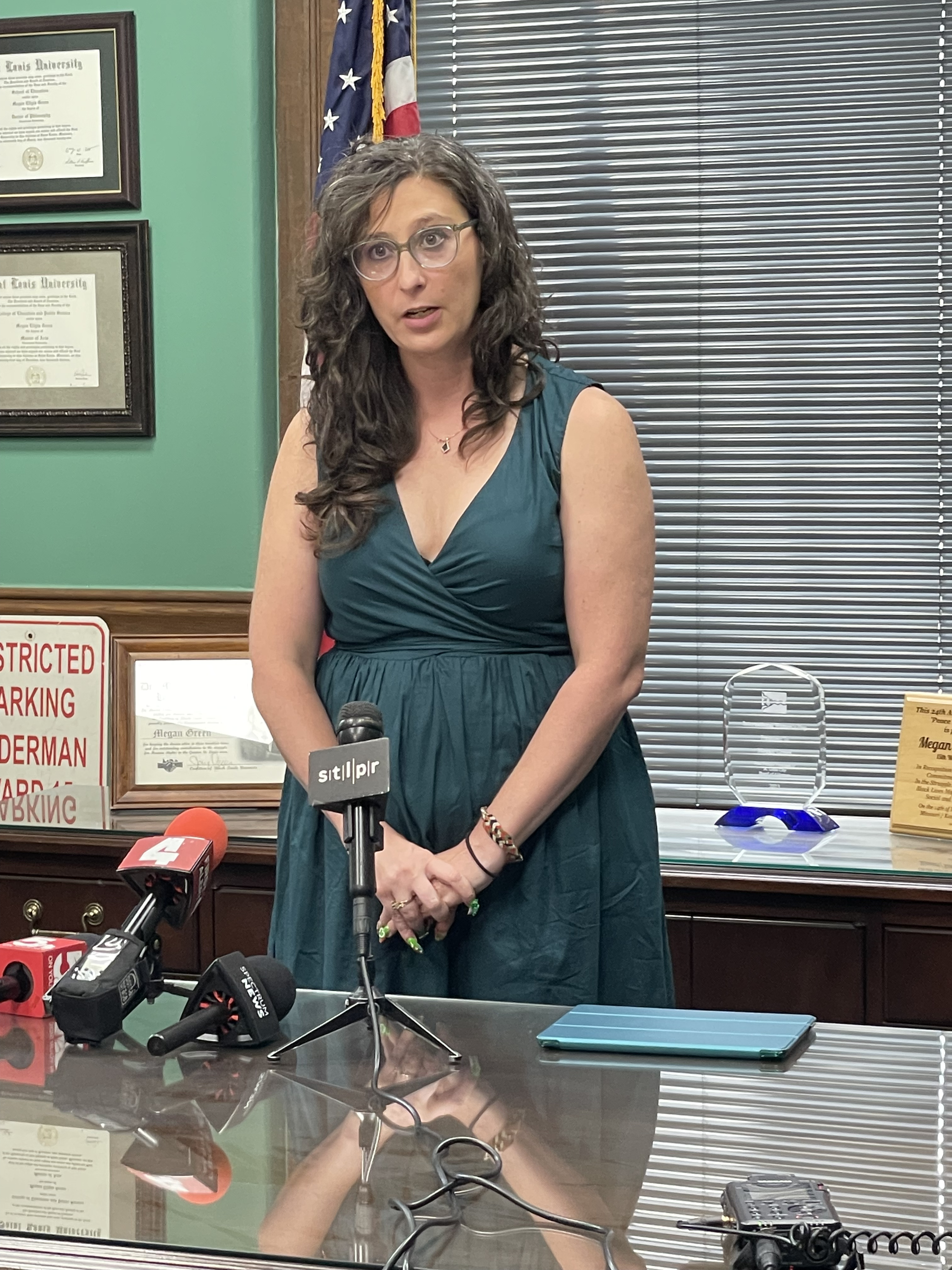
- Green in June 2024.

22nd President of the St. Louis Board of Aldermen
- Incumbent
- Assumed office November 18, 2022
- Preceded by: Joe Vollmer (interim); Lewis Reed

Member of the St. Louis Board of Aldermen from the 15th ward
- In office October 17, 2014 – November 18, 2022
- Preceded by: Jennifer Florida
- Succeeded by: Ward abolished

Personal details
- Born: Megan Ellyia Green; July 25, 1983 (age 43) Oneonta, New York, U.S.
- Party: Democratic
- Other political affiliations: Democratic Socialists of America
- Education: Pennsylvania State University (BA); Saint Louis University (MA, PhD)

Megan Ellyia Green (born July 25, 1983) is an American politician and educator. She has served as the President of the St. Louis Board of Aldermen since 2022 and previously represented the 15th ward on the Board from 2014 to 2022. Green is a progressive Democrat and a member of the Democratic Socialists of America.

Originally from Upstate New York, Green moved to St. Louis in 2005 to participate in the Coro Fellows Program in Public Affairs. She has a political science degree from Penn State and a PhD in education policy from Saint Louis University. Until 2024, Green was an adjunct professor at the Washington University in St. Louis.

In November 2022, Green won the special election to replace President of the Board of Aldermen Lewis Reed, who resigned after being indicted on federal bribery charges. The first woman to serve as Board President, Green was re-elected to a full four-year term in April 2023.

== Early life and career ==
Green was born in Oneonta, New York in 1983. Her father is a philosophy professor at SUNY Oneonta and her mother is a public school English teacher. She became politically active as a student at Penn State, participating in John Kerry's 2004 presidential campaign and fundraising for the Democratic National Committee in Chicago. In 2005, she became a Coro Fellow and re-located to Tower Grove South in St. Louis.

As part of the fellowship program, Green worked for U.S. Senator Claire McCaskill. She later participated in Teach for America and was involved in an unsuccessful effort to create a new charter school in St. Louis. She was also a local organizer for Barack Obama's 2008 presidential campaign.

== St. Louis Board of Aldermen ==
Green was first elected to the Board of Aldermen on October 7, 2014, winning a special election in the 15th ward, which covered Tower Grove South and parts of Tower Grove East. Running as an independent, she received 46% of the vote and defeated three other candidates. Green had been endorsed by Board President Lewis E. Reed. She was sworn in on October 17, 2014. The special election had been called after the previous alderwoman, Jennifer Florida, resigned to become the city's Recorder of Deeds.

Green was re-elected to the Board of Aldermen in April 2015 with nearly 89% of the vote. Her primary opponent criticized her involvement in the Ferguson protests. In March 2017, Green was challenged by her predecessor, Jennifer Florida, in the primary. Florida was charged with third-degree assault against a man in St. Louis County during the campaign. Green defeated Florida by over 30% and won the general unopposed.

In 2021, Green won a re-match against Jennifer Florida in a nonpartisan election using approval voting. In June 2022, she was the chair of the Education and Youth Matters Committee and also sat on the Health and Human Services and Convention, Tourism, Arts, and Humanities committees. In November 2022, Green vacated her 15th ward seat upon being elected President of the Board of Aldermen.

=== Bribery allegations ===
Green alleged in 2015 that a "loved one" had been offered a political bribe in return for Green "dialing down" her opposition to a proposed football stadium. She went on to criticize the Board of Aldermen's "quid pro quo mentality" and said that "the deal cutting, bribery... at City Hall will never cease to amaze me." Green later apologized to Alderman Sam Moore after implying that he had accepted bribes in exchange for his vote on the planned stadium. St. Louis Public Radio reported that Green's allegations "seemed to irritate" her fellow board members and an investigation by the St. Louis Metropolitan Police Department and the FBI determined that her claims had "no substance."

=== Reed radio show appearance ===
On January 11, 2016, Board President Lewis Reed was a guest on a radio show hosted by Bob Romanik. During the episode, Romanik called Green a "skanky bitch", "alderbitch", and "skanky-ass bitch". Reed laughed at these remarks and went on to criticize Green himself. His appearance on Romanik's show received considerable backlash and was condemned by then-Mayor Francis Slay. Reed later called Romanik's comments "out of line" and claimed that his laughter was due to shock. On February 11, Green released a statement asking Reed to apologize.

=== Flip the Board campaign ===
In the 2021 Board of Aldermen elections, Green led the Flip the Board campaign, endorsing a slate of progressive candidates running against incumbent alderpersons. Three of the four candidates were successful, reportedly resulting in a 15-seat progressive majority on the Board of Aldermen. Green later told the St. Louis Post-Dispatch that the "city electorate is a lot more progressive than people have thought recently."

== Missouri Senate campaign ==
In October 2019, Green announced her campaign for the Missouri Senate. She ran in the Senate's fifth district, which is entirely within the City of St. Louis. The 2020 Democratic primary in this district was expected to be competitive as incumbent state senator Jamilah Nasheed could not run due to term limits.

Green received endorsements from U.S. Senator Bernie Sanders and the Democratic Socialists of America. On August 4, 2020, she lost the Democratic nomination to state representative Steve Roberts by 3%.

== President of the St. Louis Board of Aldermen ==
=== Campaigns ===
==== 2019 ====
Green announced in December 2017 that she would challenge Lewis Reed in the 2019 Board President election, further straining a political relationship that the Riverfront Times characterized as approaching "dumpster fire territory." During the campaign, Green faced online attacks from the St. Louis Police Association, including one Facebook post featuring an image of Green's head digitally imposed onto the body of Mao Zedong. Green accused the posts of threatening violence, which the police union denied. The attacks were covered by The New York Times in a 2020 article about police unions' opposition to reform.

She ultimately placed third in the March 2019 Democratic primary, behind Reed and state senator Jamilah Nasheed. The St. Louis Post-Dispatch later reported that she had primarily lost due to a lack of support from Black voters on the city's north side. In January 2020, Green was fined by the Missouri Ethics Commission for failing to report campaign contributions.

==== 2022 ====
In May 2022, Reed was indicted on federal bribery charges. On June 5, Green called for Reed to "resign immediately," saying that he had "forfeited the trust" of the city. Reed ultimately resigned on June 7 and Green announced her candidacy to replace him the following week.

The only other candidate to file was Jack Coatar, an alderman whose ward was unsuccessfully targeted by Green's Flip the Board campaign in 2021. The race was characterized as pitting the city's two ideological wings against each other, with Green associated with Mayor Tishaura Jones' progressive voting bloc and Coatar aligned with more moderate Democrats. Green was endorsed by Jones, U.S. Representative Cori Bush, the St. Louis American, and the Democratic Socialists of America. She received more votes than Coatar in the September primary but both candidates advanced to the general election in November.

On November 8, 2022, Green defeated Coatar with nearly 55% of the vote to his 44%. She won 10 of the 14 wards due to a strong coalition of Black voters on the north side and progressive white voters in the Tower Grove area. She is the first woman to be elected President of the Board of Alderman.

==== 2023 ====
In December 2022, Green filed to run for re-election to a full four-year term. Despite speculation that 1st ward alderwoman Sharon Tyus would mount a challenge, Tyus opted to run in the 12th ward and Green ran unopposed. Green was re-elected in April 2023 with 89% of the vote.

=== Tenure ===
Green was sworn in as President of the Board of Aldermen on November 18, 2022; her inauguration ceremony was held on November 28. Then considered a close political ally of Mayor Tishaura Jones, Green stated that her initial priorities as President were allocating pandemic aid funds, expanding social services, and overseeing the reduction of the Board of Aldermen from 28 to 14 members.

In February 2023, the Board of Aldermen rejected a plan from President Green that would have re-allocated city funds among the wards based on perceived need rather than the current practice of equal distribution. After progressives won a majority of the new 14-member Board in the April 2023 elections, Green oversaw the passage of a rules package that de-emphasized the power of seniority in the chamber.

As President, Green has supported the professionalization of the Board of Aldermen by increasing aldermanic salaries and hiring legislative assistants. Her office created and circulated a citywide survey to gauge public opinion on ways to spend funds from the Rams settlement.

== Activism ==
Green participated in the 2014 Ferguson protests. In a September 2017 incident, Green and several others were tear-gassed by the St. Louis Metropolitan Police Department in the Central West End while protesting police brutality. She sued the city and its police department in 2018, alleging retaliation and excessive use of force.

Green was a major supporter of a bill raising the city's minimum wage to $11 and opposed efforts to privatize St. Louis Lambert International Airport. She was also involved in the Close the Workhouse movement, advocating for the closure of the Medium Security Institution in St. Louis.

During the 2024 pro-Palestine student protests, Green participated in several demonstrations at Washington University and has voiced criticisms of Israel. She was suspended from her position as an adjunct lecturer after attending a protest on April 27. Green has criticized the police response to the protests as "heavy handed" and "indiscriminate".

== Electoral history ==
=== 2014 ===
October 7, 2014 St. Louis Board of Alderman special election, 15th ward
Party	Candidate	Votes	%
Independent	Megan Green	521	45.8%
Independent	Rhonda Smythe	427	37.6%
Democratic	Missy Pinkerton-McDaniel	123	10.8%
Republican	Joshua Simpson	63	5.5%
Write-in		3	0.3%
Total votes		1,137	100.00%

=== 2015 ===
March 3, 2015, St. Louis Board of Alderman Democratic primary, 15th ward
Party	Candidate	Votes	%
Democratic	Megan Green (incumbent)	932	71.47%
Democratic	Beth Braznell	372	28.53%
Total votes		1,304	100.00%

April 7, 2015, St. Louis Board of Alderman general election, 15th ward
Party	Candidate	Votes	%
Democratic	Megan Green (incumbent)	681	88.56%
Republican	Joshua Simpson	76	9.88%
Write-in		12	1.56%
Total votes		769	100.00%

=== 2017 ===
March 7, 2017, St. Louis Board of Alderman Democratic primary, 15th ward
Party	Candidate	Votes	%
Democratic	Megan Green (incumbent)	1,757	66.10%
Democratic	Jennifer Florida	901	33.90%
Total votes		2,658	100.00%

April 4, 2017, St. Louis Board of Alderman general election, 15th ward
Party	Candidate	Votes	%
Democratic	Megan Green (incumbent)	2,259	92.47%
Write-in		184	7.53%
Total votes		2,443	100.00%

=== 2019 ===
March 5, 2019, President of the St. Louis Board of Alderman Democratic primary
Party	Candidate	Votes	%
Democratic	Lewis E. Reed	12,468	35.66%
Democratic	Jamilah Nasheed	11,057	31.62%
Democratic	Megan Green	10,890	31.14%
Democratic	Jimmie Matthews	551	1.58%
Total votes		34,966	100.00%

=== 2020 ===
August 4, 2020 Missouri Senate Democratic primary, 5th district
Party	Candidate	Votes	%
Democratic	Steve Roberts	12,293	35.4%
Democratic	Megan Green	11,241	32.4%
Democratic	Michelle Sherod	7,817	22.5%
Democratic	William C. Haas	2,068	6.0%
Democratic	Jeremiah Church	893	2.6%
Democratic	McFarlane E. Duncan	387	1.1%
Total votes		34,699	100.00%

=== 2021 ===
March 2, 2021, St. Louis Board of Alderman blanket primary, 15th ward
Party	Candidate	Votes	%
Nonpartisan	Megan Green (incumbent)	1,745	74.26%
Nonpartisan	Jennifer Florida	722	30.72%
Nonpartisan	Alexander Gremp	169	7.19%
Total votes		2,636	(Note: Because the primary election was conducted using approval voting (and voters had the opportunity to mark their approval of more than one candidate), the percentages add up to more than 100 percent.)

April 6, 2021, St. Louis Board of Alderman general election, 15th ward
Party	Candidate	Votes	%
Nonpartisan	Megan Green (incumbent)	1,917	67.26%
Nonpartisan	Jennifer Florida	927	32.53%
Write-in		6	0.21%
Total votes		2,850	100.00%

=== 2022 ===
September 13, 2022, President of the St. Louis Board of Alderman special primary election
Party	Candidate	Votes	%
Nonpartisan	Megan Green	6,497	53.68%
Nonpartisan	Jack Coatar	5,607	46.32%
Total votes		12,104	

November 8, 2022, President of the St. Louis Board of Alderman special election
Party	Candidate	Votes	%
Nonpartisan	Megan Green	43,672	54.99%
Nonpartisan	Jack Coatar	35,255	44.39%
Write-in		497	0.63%
Total votes		79,424	100.00%

=== 2023 ===
March 7, 2023 President of the Board of Aldermen primary election
Party	Candidate	Votes	%
Nonpartisan	Megan Green (incumbent)	17,177	69.2%
Total votes		17,177	69.2%

April 4, 2023 President of the Board of Aldermen general election
Party	Candidate	Votes	%
Nonpartisan	Megan Green (incumbent)	24,939	89.0%
Write-in		3,070	11.0%
Total votes		28,009	100%
