= North Riverfront, St. Louis =

Neighborhood of St. Louis in Missouri, US

Coordinates: 38.7016°N 90.2210°W

North Riverfront
- Neighborhood of St. Louis
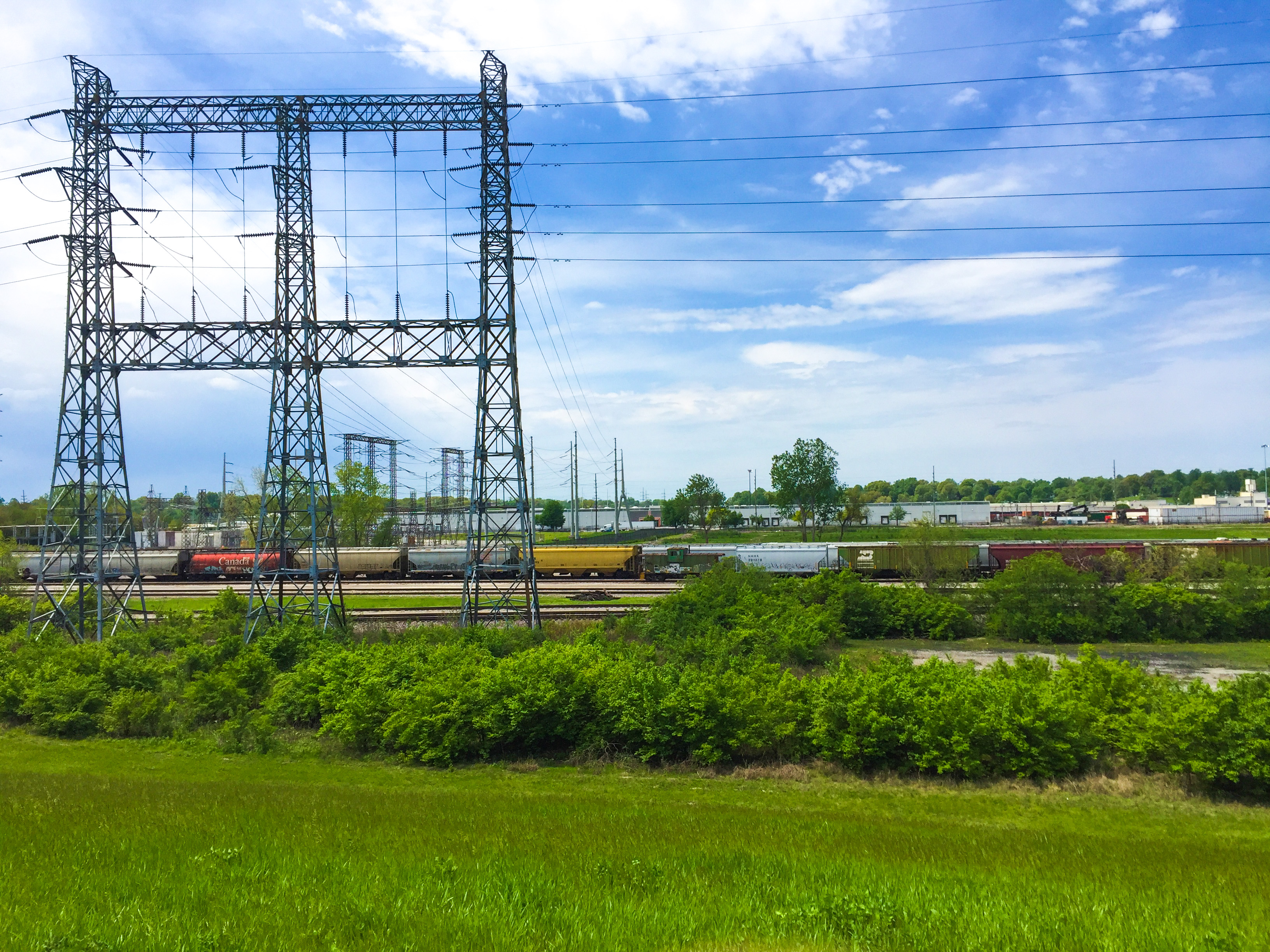
- A view of a trainyard in North Riverfront, St. Louis as seen from the St. Louis Riverfront Trail, May 2018

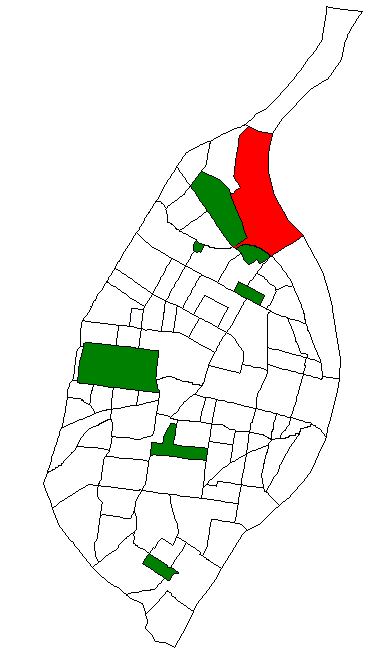
- Location (red) of North Riverfront within St. Louis
- Country: United States
- State: Missouri
- City: St. Louis
- Wards: 12, 13

Government
  - Aldermen: Sharon Tyus, Pam Boyd

Area
  - Total: 2.77 sq mi (7.2 km^{2})

Population (2020)
  - Total: 154
  - Density: 55.6/sq mi (21.5/km^{2})
- ZIP code(s): Part of 63147
- Area code(s): 314
- Website: stlouis-mo.gov

North Riverfront is a neighborhood of St. Louis, Missouri. The neighborhood is bounded by Adelaide St. on the south, the Mississippi River on the east, Maline Creek on the north, and Hall Street, Calvary Avenue, Bellefontaine Cemetery, and I-70 to the west.

== Demographics ==
Historical population
Census	Pop.	Note	%±
1990	812		—
2000	1,193		46.9%
2010	937		−21.5%
2020	154		−83.6%

In 2020 North Riverfront's population was 32.5% Black, 57.8% White, 0.6% Asian, and 7.8% Some Other Race. 9.7% of the population was of Hispanic or Latino origin.
