= Maline Creek =

River in Missouri, United States

Coordinates: 38°43′36″N 90°12′54″W

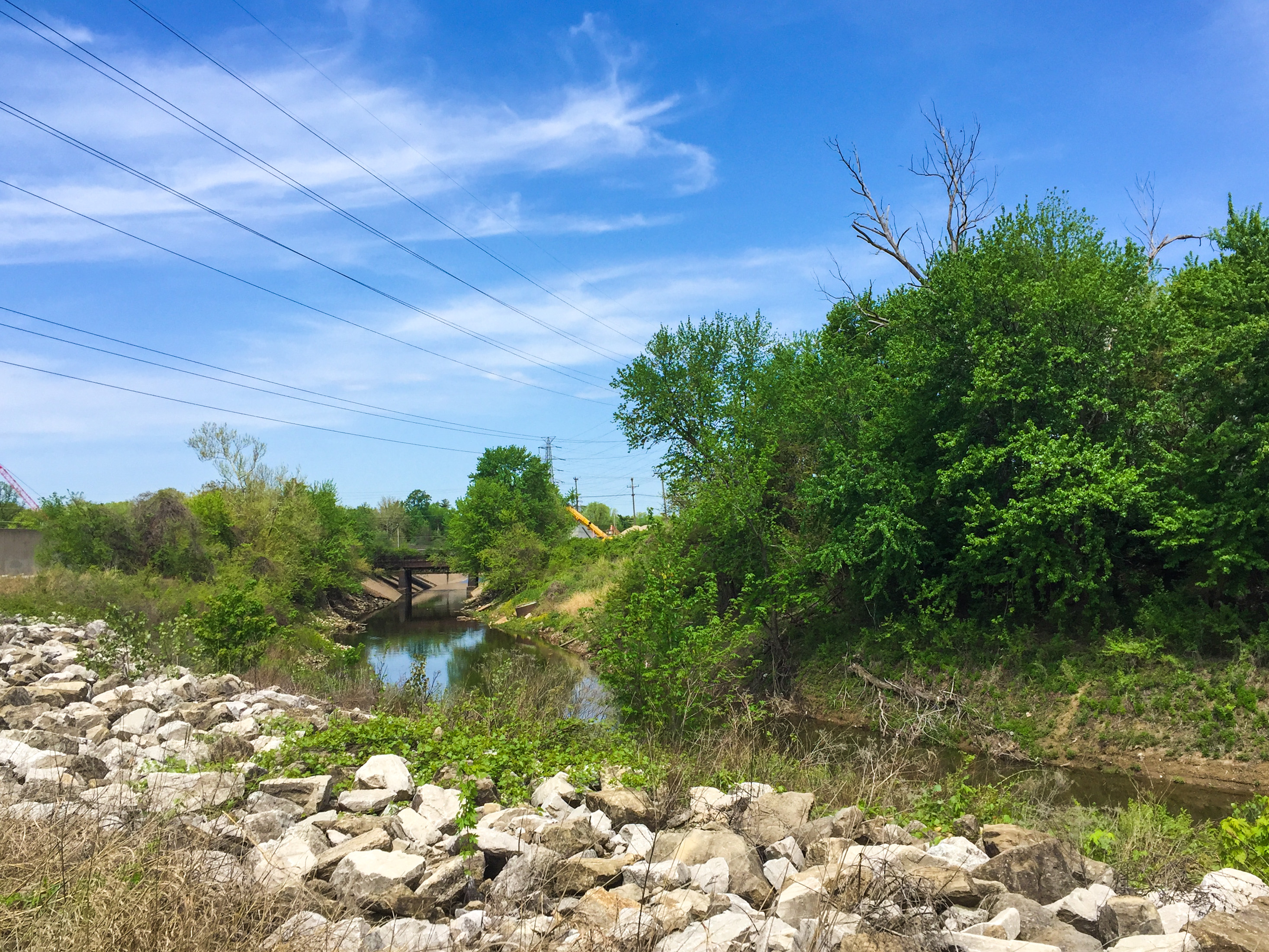
Maline Creek as seen from the nearby St. Louis Riverfront Trail, near the river mouth, May 2018

Maline Creek is a stream in St. Louis County in the U.S. state of Missouri. It is a tributary of the Mississippi River.

A variant name was "Moline Creek". The creek most likely has the name of the local Moline family.

== See also ==
- List of rivers of Missouri
