= Shaw, St. Louis =

Neighborhood of St. Louis in Missouri, US

Coordinates: 38.6126°N 90.2486°W

Shaw
- Neighborhood of St. Louis
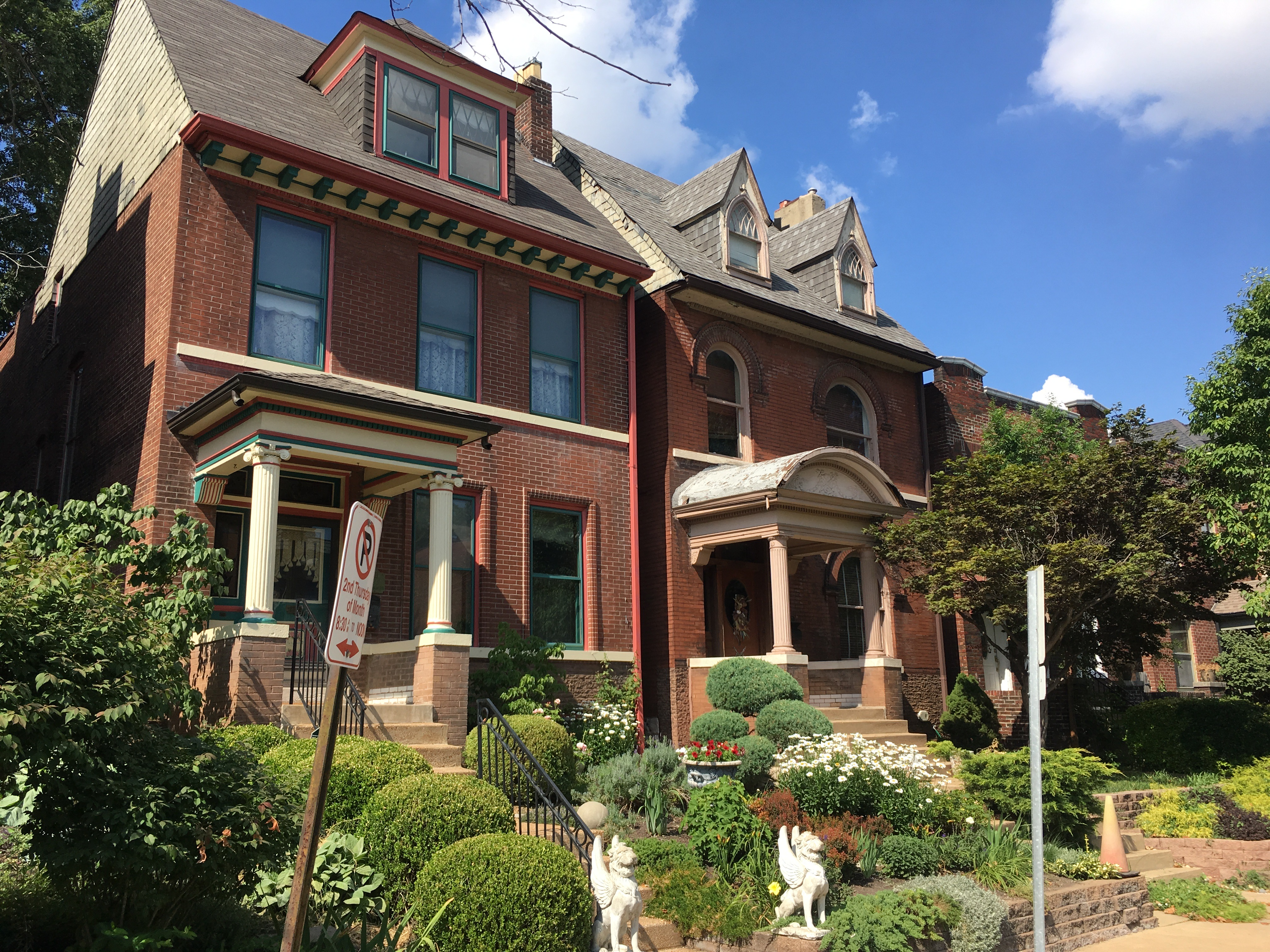
- Brick Homes on Castleman Avenue

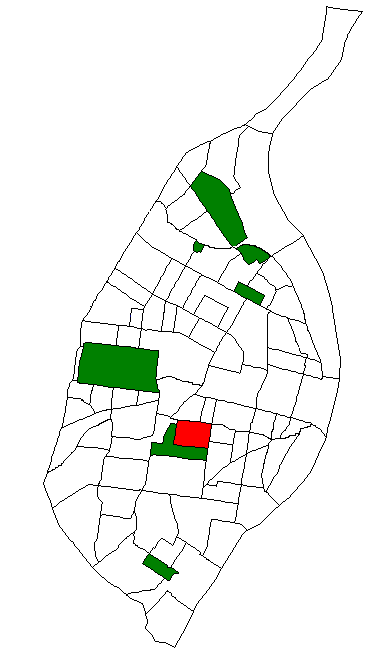
- Location (red) of Shaw within St. Louis
- Country: United States
- State: Missouri
- City: St. Louis
- Ward: 6

Government
  - Aldermen: Daniela Velázquez

Area
  - Total: 0.60 sq mi (1.6 km^{2})

Population (2020)
  - Total: 6,919
  - Density: 12,000/sq mi (4,500/km^{2})
- ZIP code(s): Part of 63110
- Area code(s): 314
- Website: stlouis-mo.gov

Shaw is a neighborhood in St. Louis, Missouri. It is bordered on the north by Interstate 44, the east by South Grand Boulevard, the west by Tower Grove Avenue and the Missouri Botanical Gardens, and the south by Tower Grove Park. The Shaw Neighborhood is a local historic district whose historic structure and character is protected by ordinance.

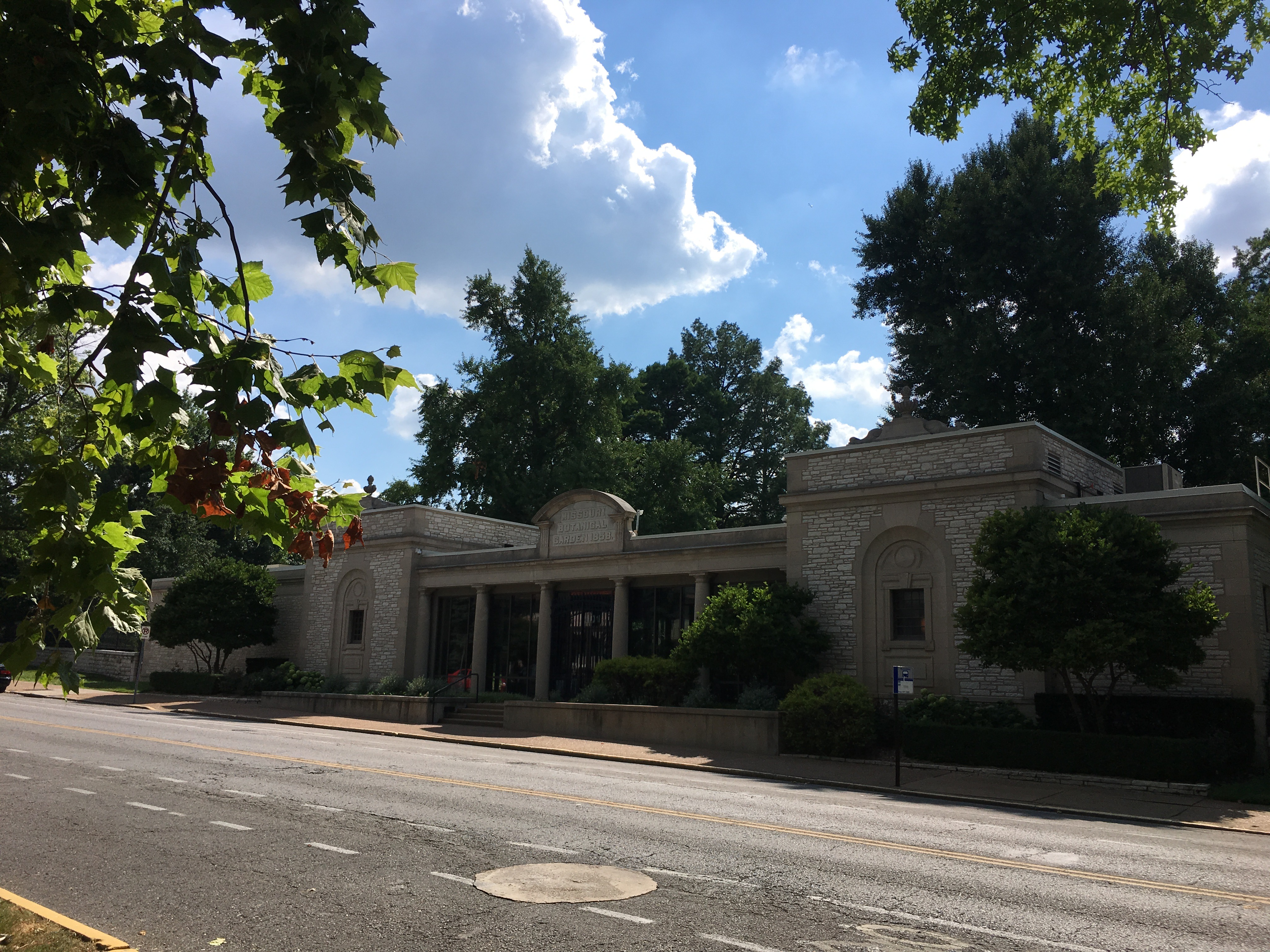
Missouri Botanical Garden from west Flora Place

A mix of single family homes and multifamily buildings create a diverse population of different ages and backgrounds.

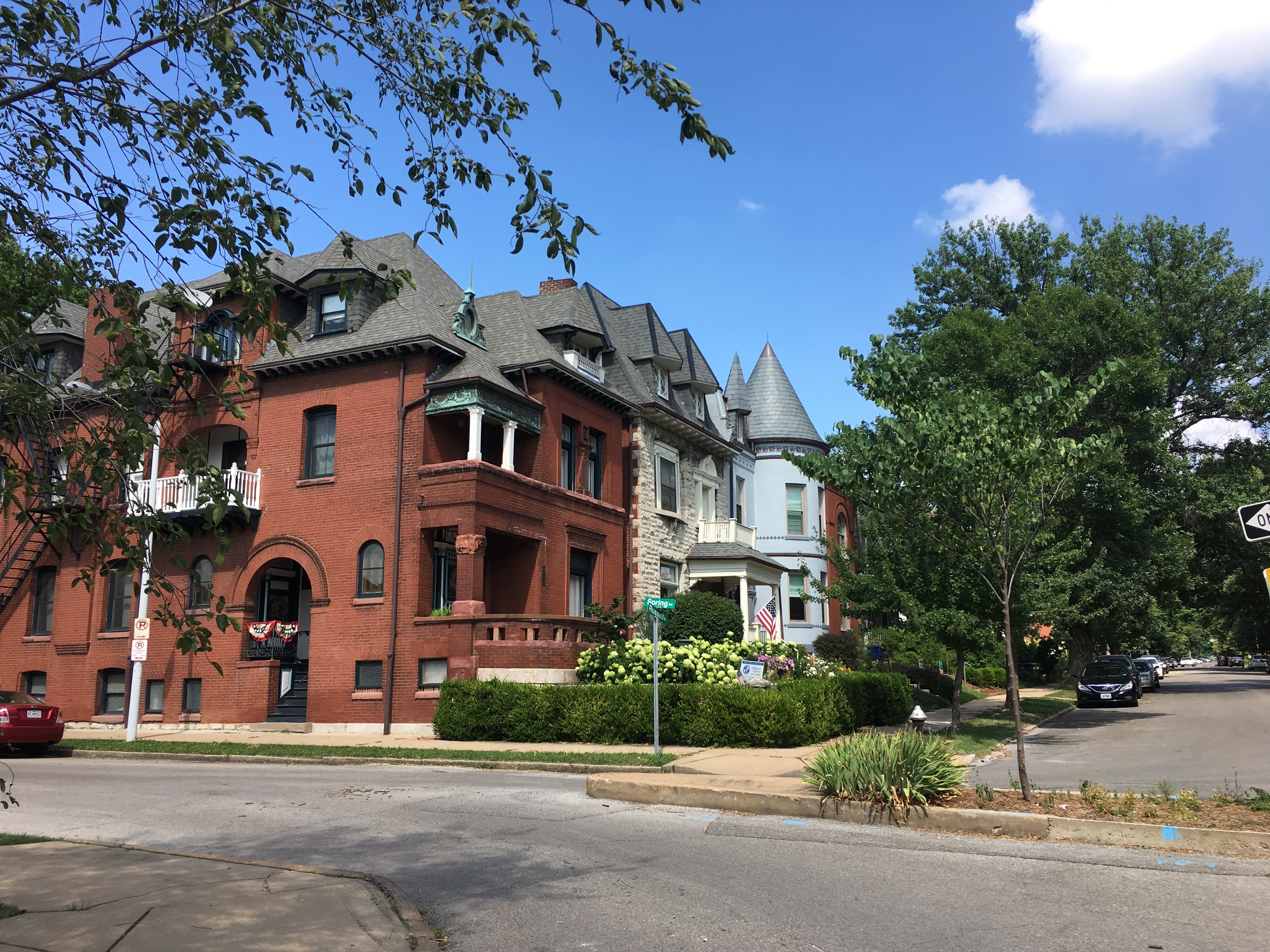
Shaw homes at the intersection of Russell Boulevard and Spring Avenue

== History ==
The Shaw neighborhood was named for Henry Shaw, the founder of the Missouri Botanical Garden. Many of the houses in Shaw and surrounding neighborhoods were built in the late 19th century and early 20th century as the border of Saint Louis City moved westward. The area that became Shaw was established in 1769. It was initially called, "Prairie des Noyers" as a French settlement.

After the Louisiana Purchase, the American government had to contend with land claims problems in the St. Louis area for decades. Land in the Prairie des Noyers were secured by various French families, who later sold their tracts to land speculators. Large sections in the present Shaw area were acquired by Major William Christy, who sold them in 1816 to William Chambers. About 1860, these tracts were willed to Chambers' daughter, Mary Lawrence Tyler, who sold them to a subdivision developer in 1888. Homes began to fill the area shortly thereafter.

By the mid 1850s, Henry Shaw had acquired several large tracts in the area, including the land now occupied by Tower Grove Park and Shaw's Garden, as well as a large tract north of the Chambers-Tyler holdings. Shaw also purchased the strip now occupied by Flora Place as an entrance way to his Botanical Garden. Most of the northern part of the Shaw area was the property of Mrs. Mary McRee, who laid out the Laclede Race Course in McRee City in 1865. This was located in the wedge between the old and new Manchester Roads. Old Manchester is now Vandeventer Avenue. Later, when Interstate 44 was built and divided the neighborhood, this area became a separate neighborhood called McRee Town.

While Henry Shaw began to subdivide his extensive land holdings as early as 1855, the earliest residential subdivision in the area was McRee City in 1869. In 1878, Shaw platted his Grand Avenue Addition, bounded by Grand, Shaw, Spring and McRee Avenues. It was Shaw's idea to duplicate a street he knew in his native England. The result consists of an oval drive around a parkway, with a fountain near its south end. Bordering the drive are ten Victorian brick houses dating from the 1880s, with high windows and white painted front porches.

They each have one bricked up window, following an English custom of closing off windows, since taxes once were assessed according to the number of windows in each house. Designed by George Ingham Barnett, their interiors have high ceilings and sliding doors of heavy wood. They were built as rental property, but upon Shaw's death, certain houses were willed to the Garden. Exceptions were houses left to Shaw's housekeeper and relatives. Shaw Place became a private street in 1915. Today it is accessible from DeTonty Street.

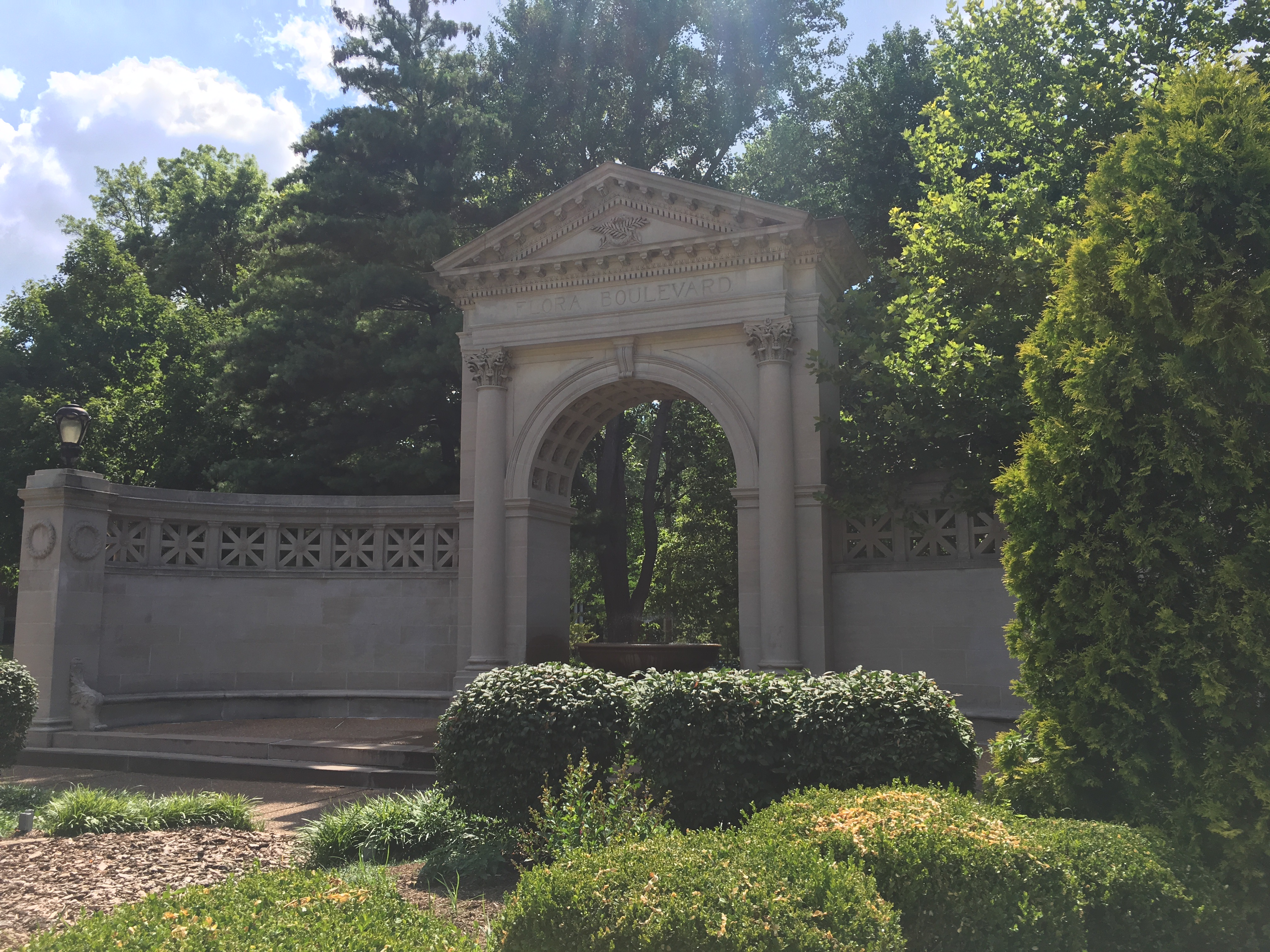
Gate to Flora Place from Grand Avenue

Shaw's Flora Boulevard subdivision, popularly known as Flora Place, was platted in 1901 and within a few years was lined with fine houses. In the years between 1911 and 1915, several sections were opened in Shaw's Lafayette Avenue Addition between Shaw and McRee, west from Grand to Tower Grove. Magnolia Place was opened in 1916, as was Shaw's Vandeventer Avenue Addition, north of the Garden. Gurney and Heger Courts were opened in 1922–23, followed in the latter years by the Shaw's Garden Subdivision, across Alfred Avenue from the west side of the Garden. It had been under-developed Garden property prior to subdivision.

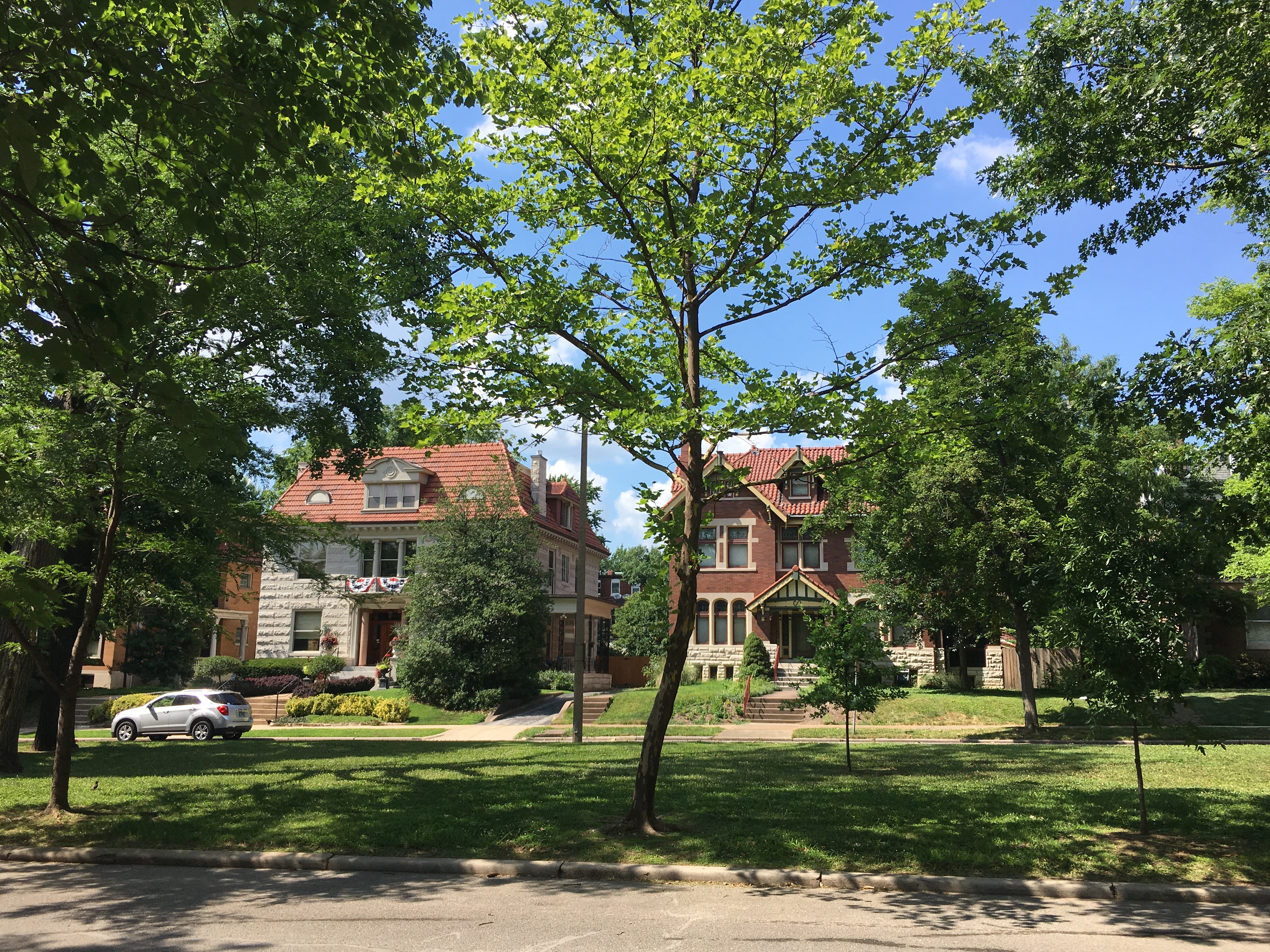
Large homes on Flora Place

In 1970, Shaw was doing relatively well, per capita income was close to the regional average and the neighborhood maintained high occupancy rates. Despite the strength of the neighborhood, macroeconomic and social changes in the 1970s resulted in challenges for the area. Population loss in the City of St. Louis, a declining regional population, and rapid suburbanization created pressures that resulted in Shaw experiencing declines on all indicators in the 1970s and 1980s. A particular challenge was the availability of mortgage and home improvement funds.

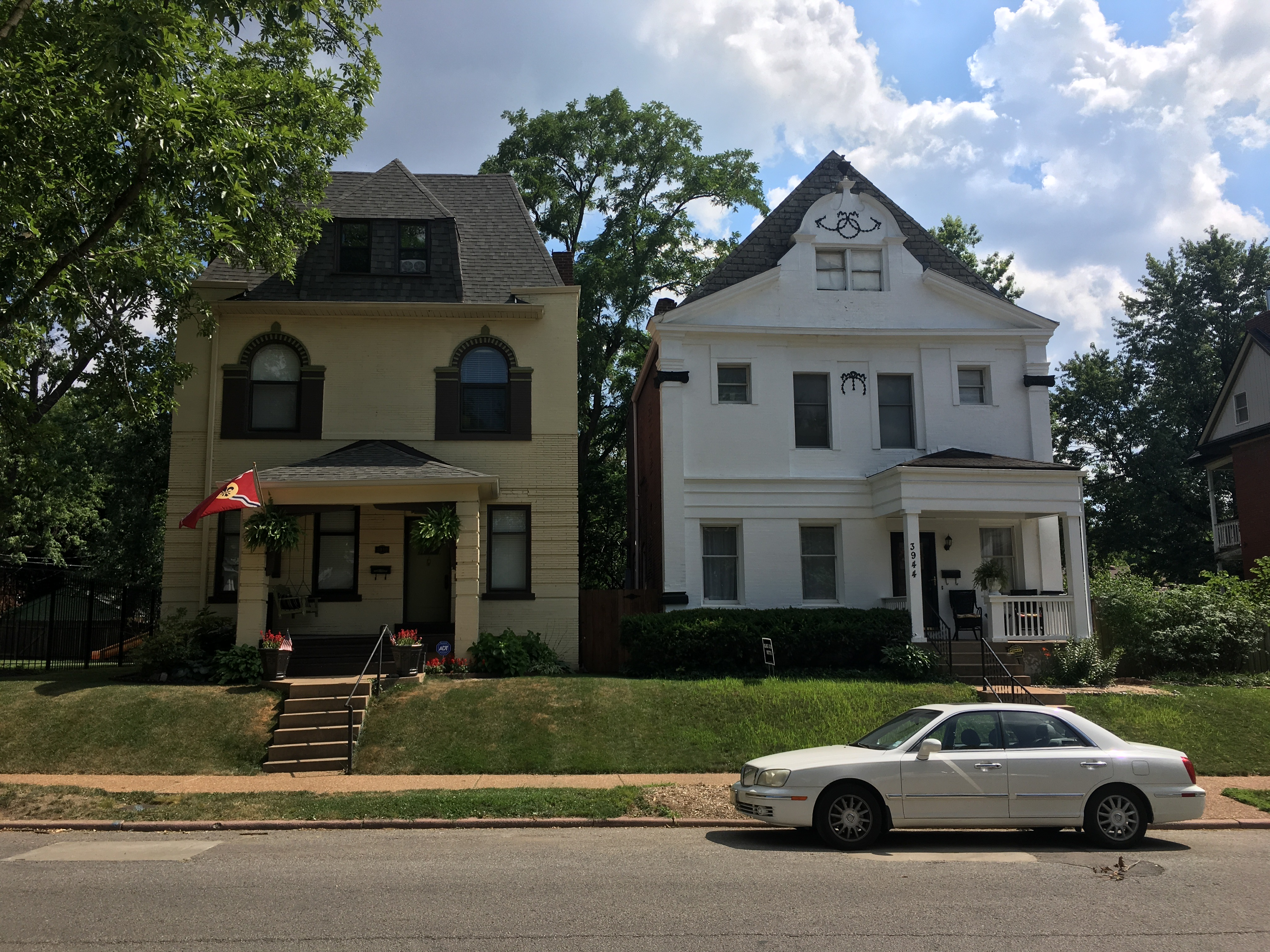
3900 Block of Russell Boulevard

Community leaders, particularly from local Catholic churches, responded to the challenges Shaw faced. St. Margaret of Scotland Catholic Church had played an important role in the neighborhood since the late 1800s, operating a parochial school that served the Shaw neighborhood. St. Margaret's members played a leading role in forming block groups to improve public safety and ensure that resident concerns were being addressed fairly.

Later, the Archdiocese awarded St. Margaret's with $250,000 in seed funding to identify city-owned, distressed properties to rehabilitate for rentals or for sale properties. The organization's name was eventually changed to the Shaw Neighborhood Housing Corporation (SNHC), and it emerged as the neighborhood's leader in attracting new development and marketing to potential residents.

In 1975, the Shaw Neighborhood Improvement Association (SNIA) was formed to address some of the neighborhood's concerns. SNIA is governed by a Board of Directors, composed of elected representatives of each neighborhood block, designed to ensure that all residents had a voice in local decision-making. The SNIA served as the voice of the neighborhood, influencing aldermen and the City of St. Louis. In 1985, Shaw was designated as a Certified Local Historic District, helping to provide incentives for redevelopment and preservation in the neighborhood.

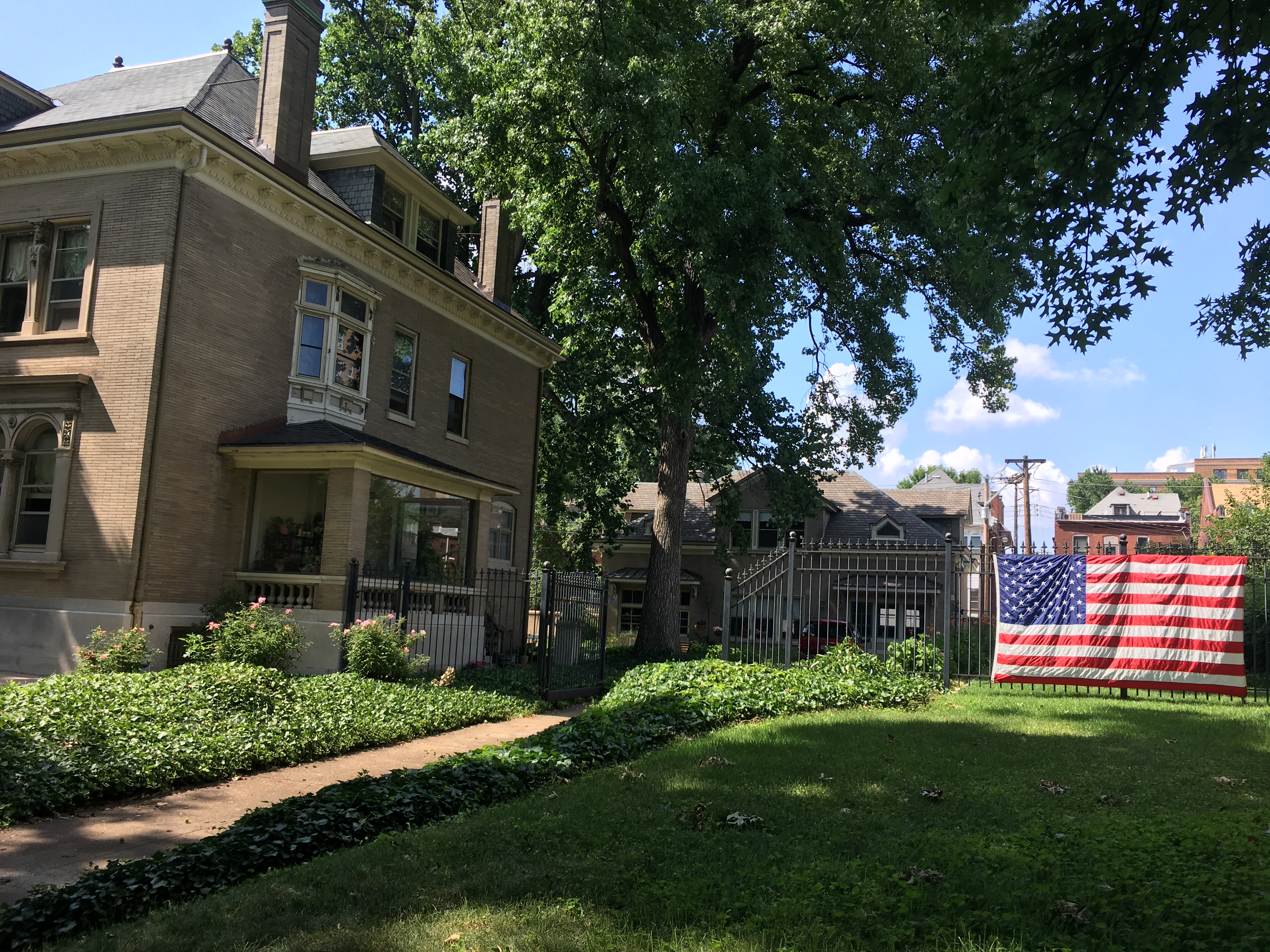
A large home on Flora Place with a carriage house

The first Imo's Pizza was opened at the corner of Thurman and Shaw Avenue in 1964.

=== Policing ===
The Flora Place Community Improvement District contracts SLMPD off-duty officers for additional security. On October 8th, 2014, at approximately 7:30pm, officer Jason Flanery shot to death VonDerrit Myers Jr., a Black teenager from the neighborhood.

Flanery was not charged with a crime. A report later revealed Myers was in possession of a firearm and had gunshot residue on his right hand. The firearm was matched to three bullets fired in the direction of the officer. Before the shooting, Myers posted photos on social media displaying himself with a matching silver-slide Smith and Wesson semi-automatic pistol.

Myers' parents sued Flanery, the Flora Place Community Improvement District, and GCI Security for wrongful death, claiming the teenager posed no threat to either Flanery or the public. The charges against the Flora Place Community Improvement District were dismissed and in 2023, the Myers family, Flanery and GCI Security reached a confidential settlement.

The St. Louis Attorney's Office published a report in May 2025 investigating the shooting.

== Demographics ==
Historical population
Census	Pop.	Note	%±
1990	7,579		—
2000	8,243		8.8%
2010	6,811		−17.4%
2020	6,919		1.6%

In 2020, the neighborhood's population was 66.2% White, 21.9% Black, 0.2% Native American, 2.8% Asian, 7.7% Two or More Races, and 1.2% Some Other Race. 4.4% of the population was of Hispanic or Latino origin.
