= Boulevard Heights, St. Louis =

Neighborhood of St. Louis in Missouri, US

Coordinates: 38.5598°N 90.2854°W

Boulevard Heights
- Neighborhood of St. Louis
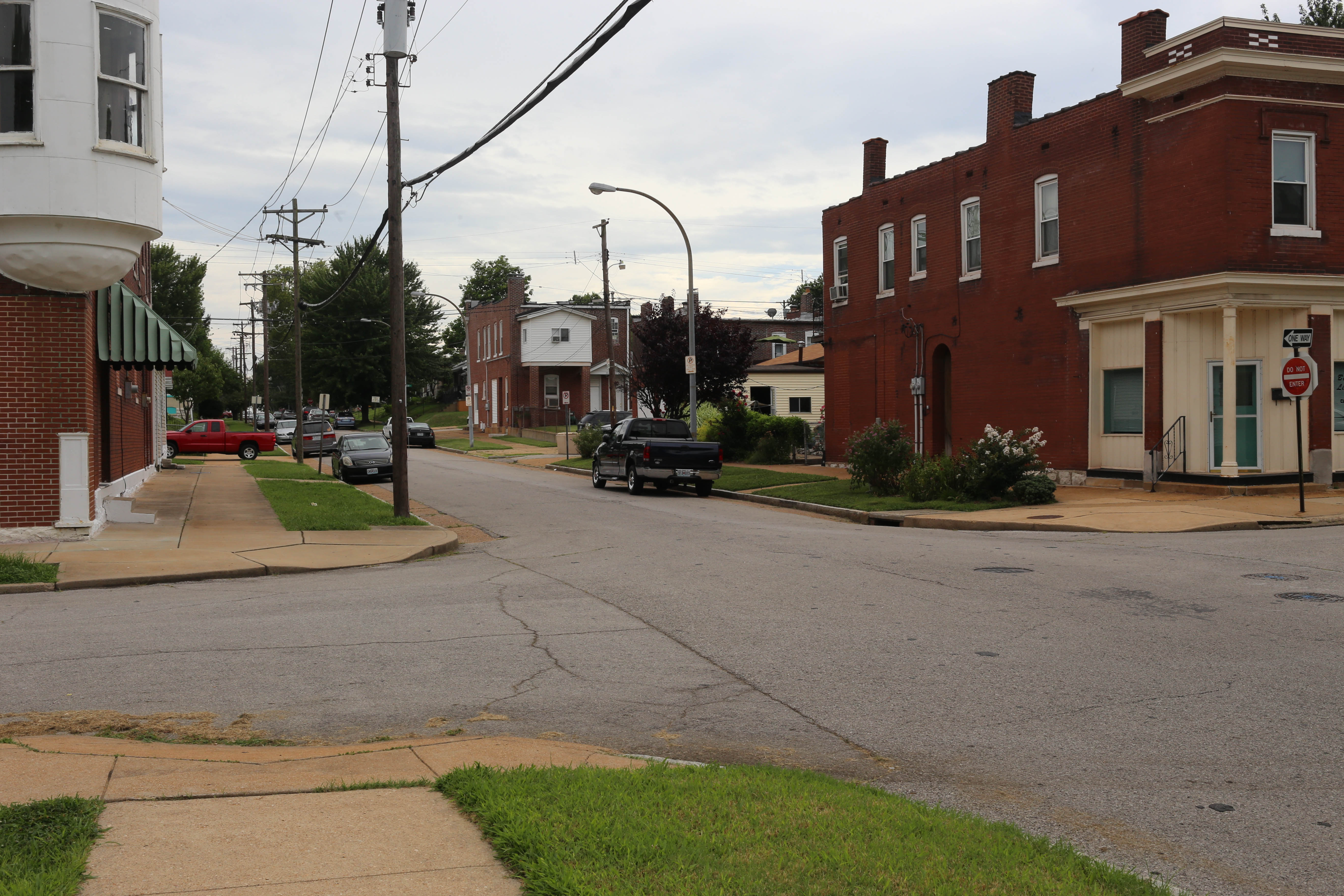
- Boulevard Heights, July 2016

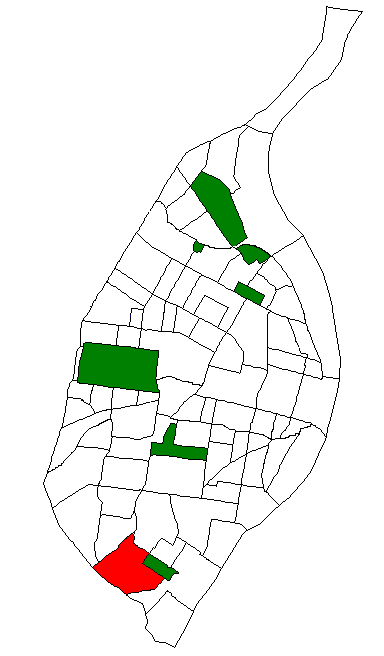
- Location (red) of Boulevard Heights within St. Louis
- Country: United States
- State: Missouri
- City: St. Louis
- Wards: 1, 2

Government
  - Alderpersons: Anne Schweitzer, Tom Oldenburg

Area
  - Total: 1.52 sq mi (3.9 km^{2})

Population (2020)
  - Total: 8,690
  - Density: 5,720/sq mi (2,210/km^{2})
- ZIP code(s): Part of 63116
- Area code(s): 314
- Website: stlouis-mo.gov

Boulevard Heights is a neighborhood of St. Louis, Missouri. The neighborhood is bounded by Gravois Avenue on the west, Holly Hills Boulevard and Carondelet Park on the north, South Grand Avenue and I-55 on the east, and the city limits on the south.

== History ==
=== Early history ===
Much of the land within the neighborhood was previously known as Morganford, and land to the east of Morganford Road was part of the Carondelet Commons. The area began to be settled by Americans and German immigrants in the 1870s, though most of the area was not residential until after World War II.

=== Churches ===
Boulevard Heights is home to numerous churches that have played important roles in the neighborhood throughout its history. Founded in 1905, the St. Lucas Evangelical Lutheran Church on Morganford Road was the first Slovak Lutheran Church west of the Mississippi. Other churches in the neighborhood include the Immaculate Heart of Mary Catholic Church, the Foursquare Church, and the Christy Park Baptist Church.

== Demographics ==
Historical population
Census	Pop.	Note	%±
1990	9,226		—
2000	8,969		−2.8%
2010	8,708		−2.9%
2020	8,690		−0.2%

In 2020 Boulevard Heights' racial makeup was 74.0% White, 6.4% Black, 0.3% Native American, 9.1% Asian, 7.9% Two Or More Races, and 2.2% Some Other Race. 5.5% of the population was of Hispanic or Latino origin.
