= St. Louis Board of Aldermen =

City legislative

- City of St. Louis

Type
- Type: Unicameral
- Term limits: None

Leadership
- President: Megan Green since November 18, 2022
- Vice-President: Shane Cohn since April 18, 2023
- Floor Leader: Shameem Clark-Hubbard since April 18, 2023
- Assistant Floor Leader: Rasheen Aldridge since April 18, 2023

Structure
- Seats: 14 ward-based alderpersons and 1 city-wide president (officially non-partisan)
- Political groups: Democratic (14)
- Authority: Charter of the City of St. Louis
- Salary: $72,000/year (alderpersons) $80,000/year (President)

Elections
- Voting system: Nonpartisan blanket primary using approval voting
- Last election: April 8, 2025
- Next election: 2027
- Redistricting: Legislative control

Meeting place
- St. Louis City Hall

Website
- stlouis-mo.gov/BoardofAldermen

The St. Louis Board of Aldermen is the lawmaking body of St. Louis, an independent city in the U.S. state of Missouri. The Board consists of 14 alderpersons, one elected by each of the city's 14 wards. The President of the Board is a separate position elected by all city voters with the same voting power as an alderperson, and serves as the body's presiding officer.

Alderpersons may introduce legislation known as board bills, which are subject to approval by the mayor if passed by the Board. The Board is responsible for setting the city budget and conducting oversight of city departments and agencies.

The Board meets in the north wing of City Hall, located in the Downtown West neighborhood. Regular elections to the Board of Aldermen are held in the spring of odd-numbered years. Beginning with the 2023 elections, the Board of Aldermen was reduced from 28 members to 14.

== Composition ==
The Board of Aldermen consists of one representative from each of the city's 14 wards. The President of the Board is elected as a separate office by a general citywide ballot. After the 2023 ward reductions, all alderpersons are elected to four-year terms during the spring election of odd-numbered years, as is the mayor.

=== Proposition R (2012) ===
Proposition R (2012) was a charter amendment passed in November 2012 to reduce the number of city of St. Louis alderpersons from 28 to 14. It was slated to take place 10 years in the future (effective January 1, 2022) and was passed by city voters on November 6, 2012, with 61 percent voting in favor (60 percent was needed for passage).

=== Proposition D (2020) ===
Proposition D, a ballot measure to make municipal elections in St. Louis officially non-partisan, was passed by city voters on November 3, 2020 with 68 percent voting in favor. Proposition D also changed St. Louis municipal elections to use approval voting, which allows voters to vote for as many candidates in a race as they would like, with each of their choices carrying an equal weight, meaning they do not rank the candidates.

=== Proposition R (2022) ===
Proposition R (2022) called for an independent commission to draw boundaries between the wards of St. Louis and ensured that the board was not able to change the election method without a public vote. Prop R also strengthened ethics by creating new stipulations for conflicts of interest and required alderpersons to recuse themselves when such conflicts arise.

== Powers ==
By custom and tradition, an alderperson has a great deal of influence over decisions impacting the ward they represent on matters ranging from zoning changes, to street resurfacing, to tax abatement to business licensing, etc.

By city charter, alderpersons are legislators. Alderpersons introduce laws and legislation known as board bills that can become city ordinances which can impact the quality of lives of city residents.

== Committees ==
As of April 2025, the Board of Aldermen has seven standing committees.

Committee	Chair
Budget & Public Employees	Rasheen Aldridge (14th)
Health & Human Development	Pamela Boyd (13th)
Housing, Urban Development, & Zoning	Shameem Clark-Hubbard (10th)
Legislation & Rules	Daniela Velázquez (6th)
Public Infrastructure & Utilities	Michael Browning (9th)
Public Safety	Bret Narayan (4th)
Transportation & Commerce	Shane Cohn (3rd)

== Qualifications ==
To become an alderperson, one must be a registered voter, twenty-five years of age, have been a United States citizen for at least five years, a resident of the city for three years, and for one year a resident of the ward from which elected. The President must be at least thirty years of age and a city resident for at least five years.

== Membership ==
While the office of alderperson is officially nonpartisan, all incumbents are either Democrats or independents. The last Republican to hold a Board seat lost re-election in 2011. The current composition of the Board was sworn in on April 15, 2025.

Ward / Position	Map	Member	Took office	Corridor	Major neighborhood(s) served	Current term expires
President		Megan Green	2022	At-large		2027
Ward 1		Anne Schweitzer	2021	South	Carondelet, Patch, Bevo Mill	2029
Ward 2		Tom Oldenburg	2017	South	St. Louis Hills, Princeton Heights, Boulevard Heights	2027
Ward 3		Shane Cohn	2009	South	Dutchtown	2029
Ward 4		Bret Narayan	2019	South	Dogtown, Lindenwood Park	2027
Ward 5		Matt Devoti	2025	South	The Hill, North Hampton, Southwest Garden	2029
Ward 6		Daniela Velázquez	2023	South	Tower Grove South, Shaw, Compton Heights	2027
Ward 7		Alisha Sonnier	2023	Central/South	Tower Grove East, Benton Park West	2029
Ward 8		Jami Cox Antwi	2025 (Note: Elected in a July 1, 2025, special election to succeed Cara Spencer, who was elected mayor.)	Central/South	Downtown, Soulard, Lafayette Square	2027
Ward 9		Michael Browning	2023	Central	Central West End, Forest Park Southeast	2029
Ward 10		Shameem Clark-Hubbard	2019	Central/North	Skinker-DeBaliviere, West End	2027
Ward 11		Laura Keys	2022	Central/North	JeffVanderLou, O'Fallon, Midtown	2029
Ward 12		Sharon Tyus	2013 (Note: Tyus was previously an alderwoman from 1991 to 2003.)	North	The Ville, Penrose	2027
Ward 13		Pamela Boyd	2017	North	Wells Goodfellow, North Riverfront	2029
Ward 14		Rasheen Aldridge	2023	Central/North	Downtown, St. Louis Place, Hyde Park	2027

== List of presidents ==
The president presides at all the meeting, preserves decorum and determines all questions of order. The president appoints standing and special committees and serves as an equal member of all committees. The president assigns bills to appropriate committees and refers bills, when ready, to the Engrossment Committee. The president directs action from the broad elevated podium in the front and center of the semi-circulate position.

Party	President	Tenure		Ref
Republican	Louis P. Aloe	1917	1924	
Republican	Walter J. G. Neun	1924	1935	
Democratic	William L. Mason	1935	1941	
Republican	Michael J. Hart	1941	1943	
Republican	Aloys P. Kaufmann	1943	1943	
Republican	Edgar S. Nicolai	1943	1945	
Republican	Albert L. Schweitzer	1945	1947	
Republican	Charles Albanese	1947	1955	
Democratic	Donald Gunn	1955	1959	
Democratic	A. J. Cervantes	1959	1963	
Democratic	Donald Gunn	1963	1968	
Democratic	James Noonan	1968	1969	
Republican	Joseph Badaracco	1969	1975	
Democrat	Paul Simon	1975	1980	
Democratic	Eugene Bradley (interim)	1980	1980	
Democratic	Thomas Zych	1980	1987	
Democratic	Thomas A. Villa	1987	1995	
Democratic	Francis G. Slay	1995	2001	
Democratic	James F. Shrewsbury	2001	2007	
Democratic	Lewis E. Reed	2007	2022	
Democratic	Joseph Vollmer (interim)	2022	2022	
Democratic	Megan Green	2022 (incumbent)		

== Party composition ==
Party composition
Year	Democratic	Republican	Independent
1945	8	20	0
1947	8	20	0
1949	13	15	0
1951	17	11	0
1953	21	7	0
1955	24	4	0
1957	24	4	0
1959	24	4	0
1961	24	4	0
1963	24	4	0
1965	26	2	0
1967	22	6	0
1969	24	4	0
1971	24	4	0
1973	25	3	0
1975	26	2	0
1977	27	1	0
1979	26	2	0
1981	26	2	0
1983	27	1	0
2009	27	1	0
2011	27	0	1
2013	27	0	1
2015	28	0	0
2017	28	0	0
2019	28	0	0
2021	28	0	0
2023	14	0	0
2025	14	0	0
