= Penrose, St. Louis =

Neighborhood of St. Louis in Missouri, US

Coordinates: 38.6781°N 90.2398°W

Penrose
- Neighborhood of St. Louis
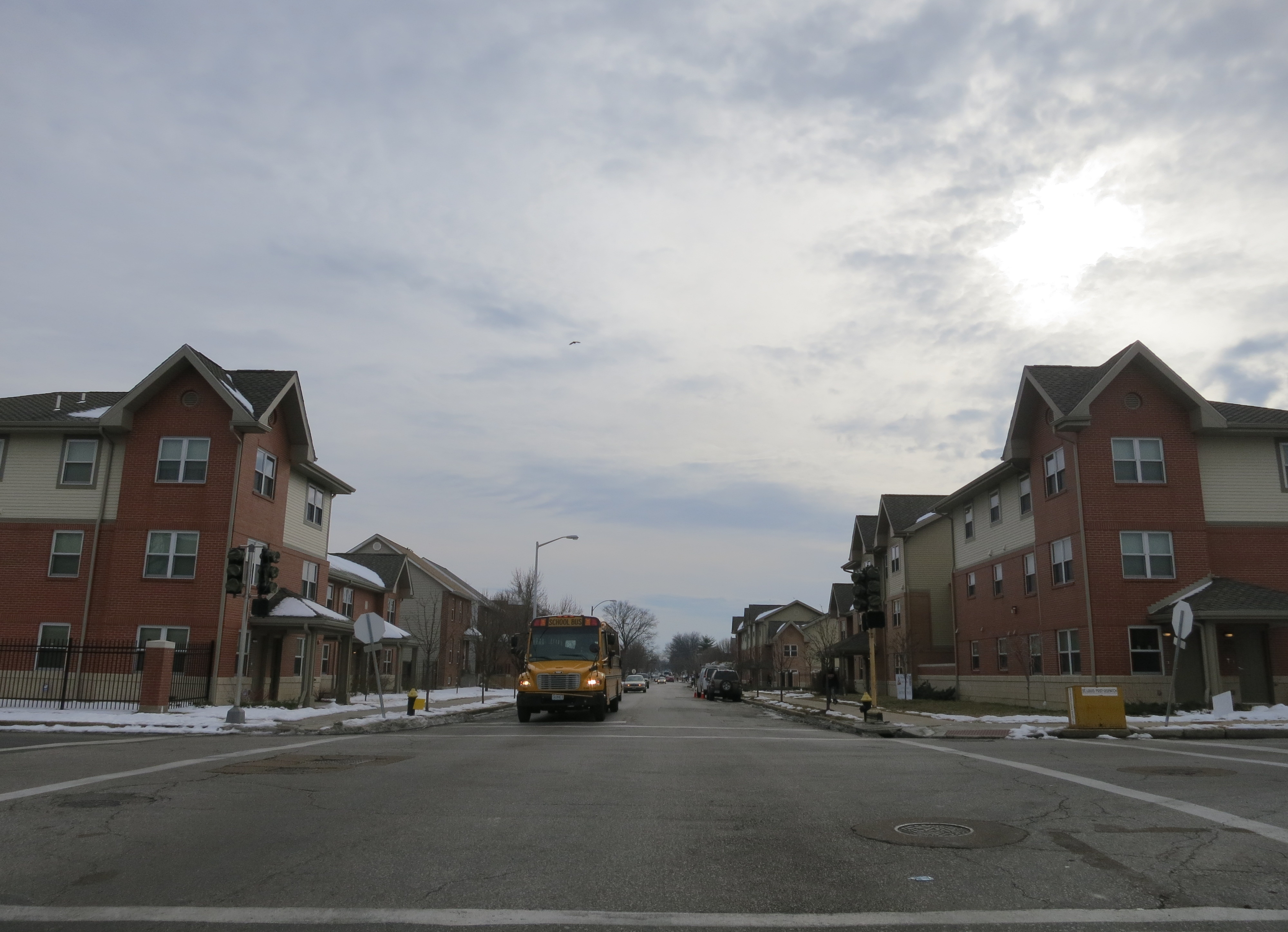
- Residential modern infill on North Newstead, February 2013

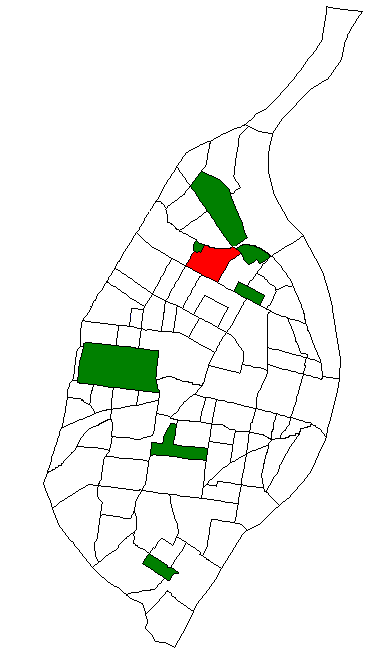
- Location (red) of Penrose within St. Louis
- Country: United States
- State: Missouri
- City: St. Louis
- Wards: 11, 12

Government
  - Aldermen: Laura Keys, Sharon Tyus

Area
  - Total: 0.77 sq mi (2.0 km^{2})

Population (2020)
  - Total: 5,243
  - Density: 6,800/sq mi (2,600/km^{2})
- ZIP code(s): Part of 63115
- Area code(s): 314
- Website: stlouis-mo.gov

Penrose is a primarily residential neighborhood of St. Louis, Missouri. The neighborhood is located on the north side of the city just south of Interstate 70 and west of O’Fallon Park. It is bounded by Florissant Avenue and I-70 on the north, Natural Bridge Avenue on the south, North Newstead and Pope Avenues on the east, and Kingshighway Boulevard on the west.

== Demographics ==
Historical population
Census	Pop.	Note	%±
1990	8,451		—
2000	7,433		−12.0%
2010	6,387		−14.1%
2020	5,243		−17.9%

As of the 2020 Census, there were 5,243 people living in Penrose, a decrease of 18% since 2010 and a decrease of 29% since 2000. Penrose's racial makeup in 2020 was 95.3% Black, 0.9% White, 0.5% Native American, 2.8% Two or More Races, and 0.5% Some Other Race. 0.8% of the people were of Hispanic or Latino origin.

== Politics ==
The Penrose neighborhood is split with half of it in the city's 21st Ward and the other half in the city's 1st Ward. Penrose is represented by Alderwoman Sharon Tyus in the 1st Ward, and Alderman John Collins-Muhammad in the 21st Ward.

== Education ==
=== Public schools ===
Penrose residents are served by the St. Louis Public School District.

Ashland Elementary School, designed by local architect William B. Ittner in the Jacobethan style, is a K-5 school located in the neighborhood at 3921 N. Newstead Ave.

The district also operated the Scullin School, a K-5 school designed by another local architect, Rockwell M. Milligan, but it closed in 2003 and is now listed as one of the district's surplus properties.

Ashland Branch School, originally a receiving home for the Children's Home Society of Missouri, was operated by the district as a preschool and kindergarten until its closure in 2009 and is now listed as under contract as of 2023.

=== Private schools ===
The Roman Catholic Archdiocese of St. Louis operates the St. Louis Catholic Academy, a K-8 school, at 4720 Carter Ave.

=== Public libraries ===
St. Louis Public Library operates the Julia Davis Library at 4415 Natural Bridge Ave.

== Parks and recreation ==
Eugene "Tink" Bradley Park, a 3.18 acre city-run park with a basketball court, softball field, and playground, is located in the neighborhood.

Penrose Park, a 51.22 acre city-run park which contains a basketball court, baseball field, handball court, softball field, tennis court, playground, pavilion, and one of only twenty-seven velodromes in the United States, is also located in the neighborhood.

== Religion ==
The Roman Catholic Archdiocese of St. Louis operates the St. Elizabeth Mother of John the Baptist Catholic Church at 4330 Shreve Ave.

St. Peter A.M.E. Church, a historic African Methodist Episcopal congregation, moved into the neighborhood in 1962 at 4730 Margaretta Ave.
