= Patch, St. Louis =

Neighborhood of St. Louis in Missouri, US

Coordinates: 38.5438°N 90.2621°W

Patch
- Neighborhood of St. Louis
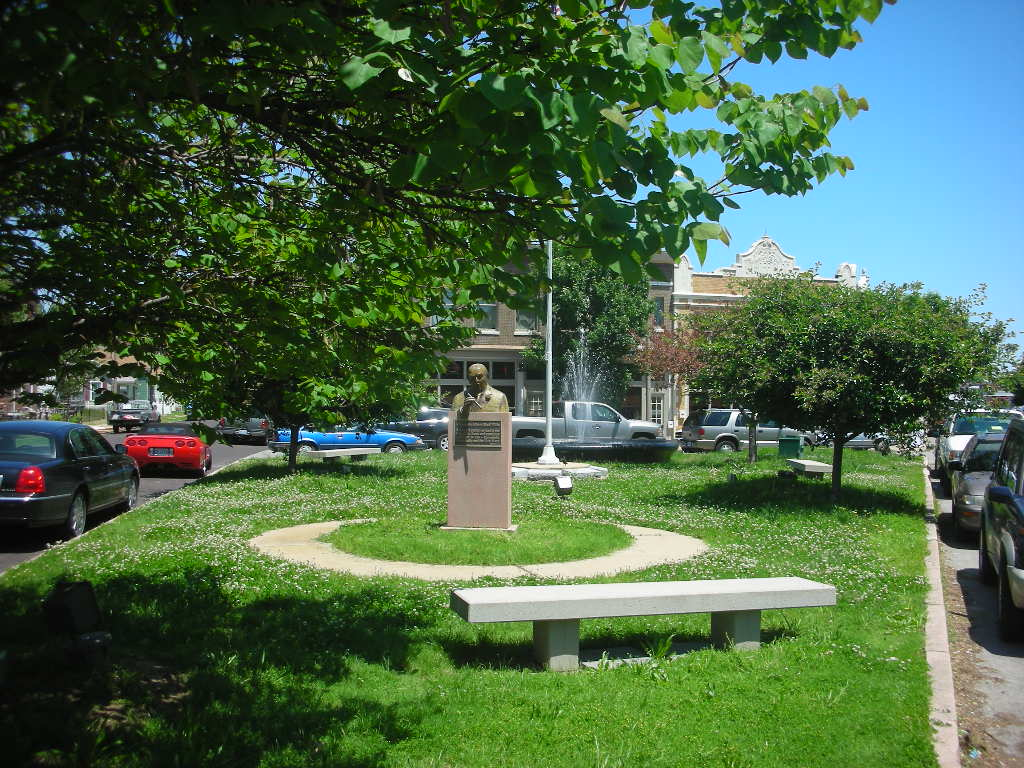
- Ivory Triangle in Patch with bust of Albert "Red" Villa.

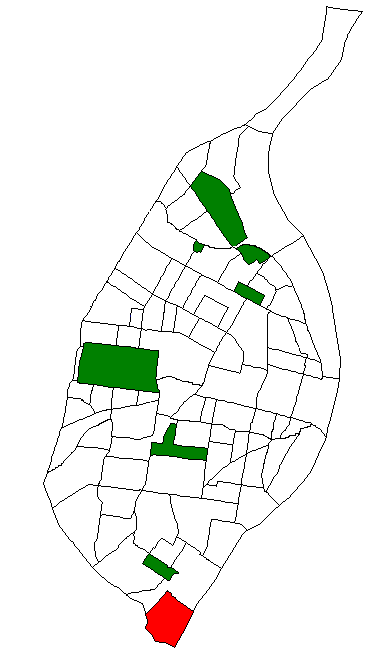
- Location (red) of Patch within St. Louis
- Country: United States
- State: Missouri
- City: St. Louis
- Wards: 1

Government
  - Aldermen: Anne Schweitzer

Area
  - Total: 1.02 sq mi (2.6 km^{2})

Population (2020)
  - Total: 2,842
  - Density: 2,790/sq mi (1,080/km^{2})
- ZIP code(s): Parts of 63111
- Area code(s): 314
- Website: stlouis-mo.gov

Patch is a neighborhood of St. Louis, Missouri. The Patch neighborhood forms the southern tip of the Carondelet neighborhood. It is defined by Robert Avenue on the north, the City Limits to the south, Alabama Avenue to the west, and by the Mississippi River to the east.

== Institutions ==
The Carondelet neighborhood has several schools located within its environs. Some of the more notable schools include Woodward School, St. Cecilia's, Blow Middle School, and St. Boniface School, though only St. Boniface is in the Patch. South Public Park is located in the Patch neighborhood. The neighborhood is home to several City churches including St. Trinity Lutheran Church, St. Boniface, Carondolet United Church of Christ.

== Characteristics ==
This section of the Carondelet neighborhood is historic. There are Civil War-era buildings in the area, National Register-listed stone houses, and Sisters of the Saint Joseph's headquarters for the St. Louis Province. The area is one that is being developed with regard to business. The Carondelet Community Betterment Federation is active in the area. Commercial redevelopment activities have focused on South Broadway and the Ivory Triangle.

== Demographics ==
Historical population
Census	Pop.	Note	%±
1990	3,463		—
2000	2,998		−13.4%
2010	2,695		−10.1%
2020	2,842		5.5%

In 2020 Patch's racial makeup was 55.2% White, 29.7% Black, 1.0% Native American, 1.3% Asian, 8.8% Two or More Races, and 4.2% Some Other Race. 8.1% of the people were of Hispanic or Latino origin.
