= Lindenwood Park, St. Louis =

Neighborhood of St. Louis in Missouri, US

Coordinates: 38.598°N 90.306°W

Lindenwood Park
- Neighborhood of St. Louis
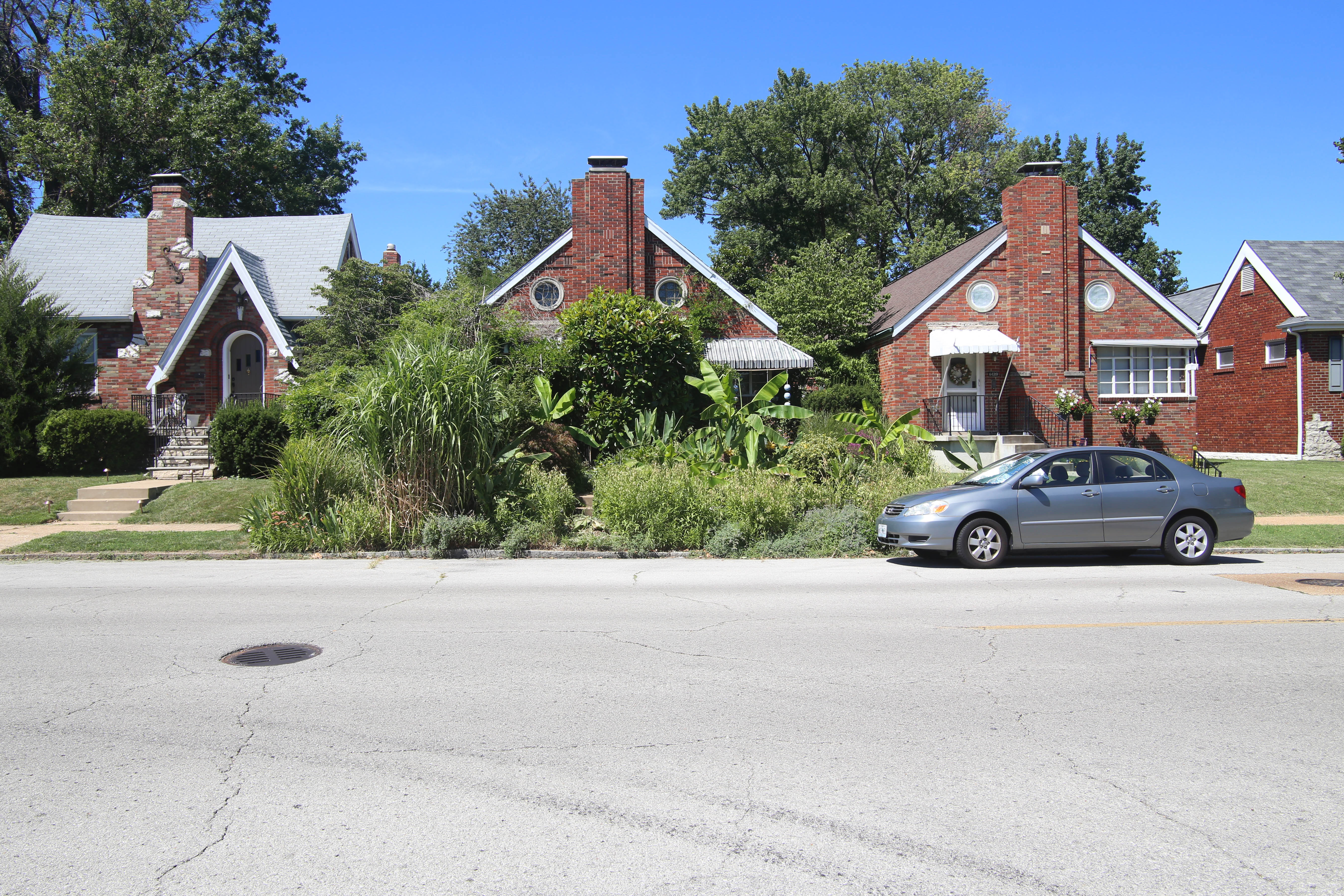
- Lindenwood Park Homes, July 2017

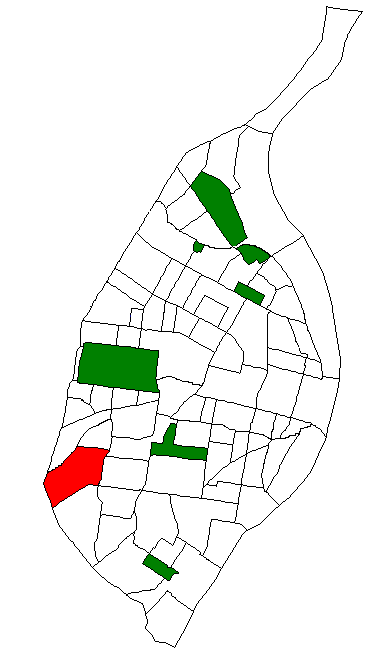
- Location (red) of Lindenwood Park within St. Louis
- Country: United States
- State: Missouri
- City: St. Louis
- Wards: 4

Government
  - Aldermen: Bret Narayan

Area
  - Total: 1.5 sq mi (3.9 km^{2})

Population (2020)
  - Total: 9,387
  - Density: 6,300/sq mi (2,400/km^{2})
- ZIP code(s): Parts of 63109, 63139
- Area code(s): 314
- Website: stlouis-mo.gov

Lindenwood Park is a neighborhood of St. Louis, Missouri, United States. The Lindenwood Neighborhood is defined by Arsenal Street and I-44 to the north, Watson and Chippewa Street to the south, Hampton Avenue on the east and the city limits to the west.

== Characteristics ==
Lindenwood Park is largely composed of brick housing stock. Most of the houses were built from the 1930s to the 1950s; some new construction is evident but is limited because there is a lack of open, undeveloped land suitable for development.

The neighborhood housing inventory is primarily single-family with some multi-family.

=== Housing snapshot ===
A July 2002, review of the Lindenwood Park Neighborhood housing stock shows the following characteristics:

- Average housing age is 53 years.
- 83% of the housing stock is single-family detached, 5% is 2-unit building, 10% is 3-9 unit building, 2% other.
- 83% is owner-occupied.
- Median housing value is $180,000.
- 17% of the housing stock is renter-occupied.
- Median monthly rent is $900.

=== Commercial ===
Commercial establishments are located primarily along Hampton and Watson. Lindenwood has a number of Italian restaurants, which represents an influence from the St. Louis Italian Hill neighborhood to the northeast of Lindenwood.

== History ==
The area originally consisted of parts of a vast Spanish land grant granted by Charles Gratiot in 1798. During the first half of the nineteenth century, this broad area was subdivided into various large tracts. Development began in earnest during the first half of the twentieth century.

During the 1920s and 1930s, rapid development occurred in the area. Between Hampton and Watson, north of Pernod to Marquette, Southwest Park was opened in 1924, Watson Terrace was platted in 1924, followed by Rohndale on Bancroft Avenue in 1926, and Ivanhoe Park in 1927. East of Watson, between Pernod and Chippewa, Somerset Park was platted in 1926, as was the Watson-Chippewa Subdivision in 1928, Wenzlick Park in 1929, and Milton Terrace in 1937. Most major new housing development was completed by 1950, with spot infill development occurring after that time. The most recent major development was the subdivision of Lindenwood Heights in 1963.

The names of the Lindenwood streets memorialize prominent citizens and landowners at the time of development. Among the landholders commemorated by street names are James McCausland, James V. Prather, Joseph Weil, Adele Tholozan, Wesley Watson, and James Fyler. Subdividers' names include Bradley, Smiley, and Scanlan.

Two nationally prominent Americans of the 1880s who are commemorated are General Winfield Scott Hancock, a Union general in the American Civil War and presidential nominee in 1880, and Chester A. Arthur, the Republican vice-president who succeeded to the presidency after the assassination of James A. Garfield in 1881. Both Hancock and Arthur died in 1886, shortly before the opening of the Harlem Place subdivision.

== Demographics ==
Historical population
| Census | Pop. | Note | %± |
|---|---|---|---|
| 1990 | 10,905 | | — |
| 2000 | 10,207 | | −6.4% |
| 2010 | 9,486 | | −7.1% |
| 2020 | 9,387 | | −1.0% |

In 2020 Lindenwood Park's racial makeup was 83.1% White, 6.3% Black, 0.1% Native American, 2.5% Asian, 6.6% Two or More Races, and 1.3% Some Other Race. 4.4% of the people were of Hispanic or Latino origin.
