= St. Louis Hills, St. Louis =

Neighborhood of St. Louis in Missouri, US

Coordinates: 38.5796°N 90.3018°W

St. Louis Hills
- Neighborhood of St. Louis
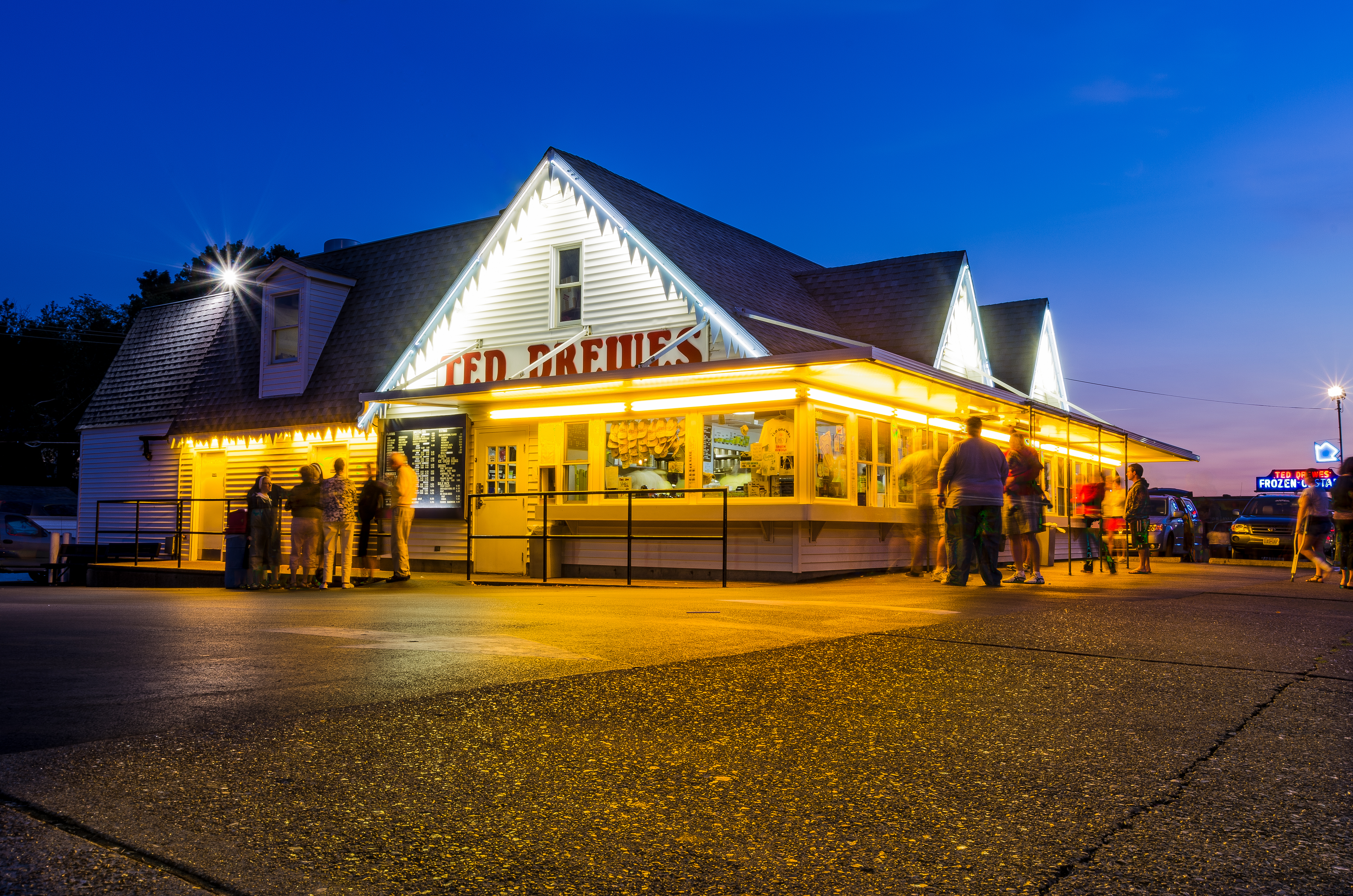
- Chippewa location of Ted Drewes Frozen Custard

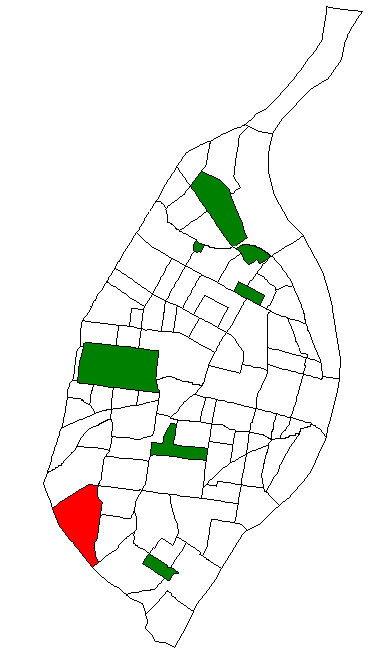
- Location (red) of St. Louis Hills within St. Louis
- Country: United States
- State: Missouri
- City: St. Louis
- Wards: 2

Government
  - Aldermen: Tom Oldenburg

Area
  - Total: 1.63 sq mi (4.2 km^{2})

Population (2020)
  - Total: 7,516
  - Density: 4,610/sq mi (1,780/km^{2})
- ZIP code(s): Parts of 63110, 63139, 63109
- Area code(s): 314
- Website: stlouis-mo.gov

St. Louis Hills is a neighborhood in St. Louis, Missouri. The neighborhood, which is home to the Chippewa location of Ted Drewes Frozen Custard, is situated in the southwest part of St. Louis. It is bounded by Chippewa Street to the northwest and north, Hampton Avenue to the east, Gravois Avenue to the southeast, and the St. Louis county border to the southwest.

== Overview ==
St. Louis Hills is rich in its architecture, strategic location, and its history. "Country living in the City" was the phrase used to market St. Louis Hills in the 1930s since St. Louis Hills was so far west of any other residential or commercial buildings located within the City limits.

== St. Louis Hills History ==
The history of St. Louis Hills, developed from 1930-50s, is relatively recent compared to the city's beginnings in 1763. The land which became St. Louis Hills dates back to deeds granted to pioneer French colonists Madame Ann Camp and Anton Reihle in 1768 by one founder of the Village of St. Louis, Pierre Laclède. At the time, the land included 2,471 acres. Camp and Reihl's heirs sold the land to George C. Clarke, who gave it to two sons. When the Village was chartered as the City of St. Louis in 1836, St. Louis Hills was still remote, open, and forested land, and essentially remained so until the early 1930s. In 1876, when the county and city of St. Louis separated, the western boundary of St. Louis City was set just west of the River des Peres (River of the Fathers). Even then, what is now St. Louis Hills was still open land.

David Rowland Francis, Governor of the state from 1889-1893, became the owner of part of the property in 1884 on which he established his vast farm. At the turn of the century, David R. Francis was President of the Louisiana Purchase Exposition from 1889 until its opening in 1904. Francis originally considered the use of his farmland as a site for the World's Fair, but logistics of transportation and construction to Francis' land persuaded the use of Forest Park as the now-famous 1904 World's Fair site. Francis was appointed U.S. Ambassador to Russia in 1916. The next year, Francis made a gift of the land to the city, and so it was named Francis Park. David Rowland Francis died on January 15, 1927.

Cyrus Crane Willmore, for whom the neighborhood's second park is named, became the visionary developer of the St. Louis Hills 700 acre neighborhood. He came to St. Louis in 1912 after graduation from the University of Illinois law school and worked for a realty firm until 1922 when he formed his own company. Willmore's intentions for the area were clear from the beginning: tree-lined residential streets for families and single persons, churches and schools throughout, bordered on three sides by developing businesses, and open green spaces in parks. (See Architecture and Parks for more information.)

Names of streets within the neighborhood, as well as early development architecture, reflect Willmore's English heritage—Nottingham Avenue, Devonshire Avenue, Tamm Avenue to name a few. Eichelberger Street, a main east-west roadway through the center of St. Louis Hills, was originally named Clarke Road for George C. Clarke. Mature trees lining streets throughout the area are predominantly oak, maple, poplar, with birch trees along Francis Park.

St. Louis Cardinals Hall-of-Famer Stan Musial lived in St. Louis Hills for much of his baseball career, on Childress Avenue from 1948 to 1955 and Westway Road from 1955 to 1965.

St Louis Hills is divided into two Catholic parishes: St Gabriel the Archangel in the north and St Raphael the Archangel in the southern end of the neighborhood.

== Demographics ==
Historical population
Census	Pop.	Note	%±
1990	6,786		—
2000	7,506		10.6%
2010	7,373		−1.8%
2020	7,516		1.9%

In 2020 St. Louis Hills' racial makeup was 88.8% White, 3.7% Black, 0.2% Native American, 1.5% Asian, 5.0% Two or More Races, and 0.9% Some Other Race. 2.6% of the population was of Hispanic or Latino origin.
