= Compton Hill Reservoir Park =

Public park in St Louis, Missouri

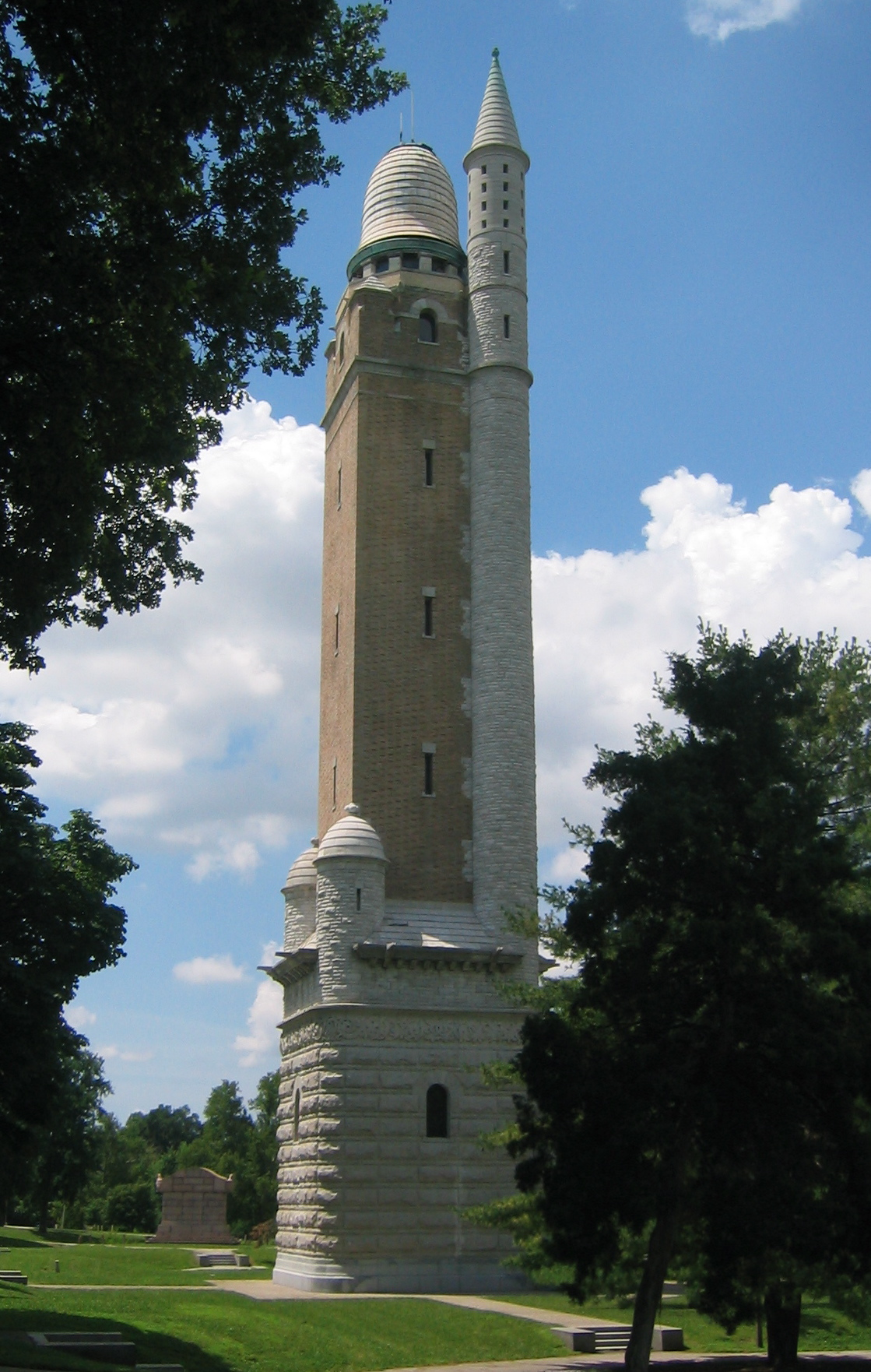
- Compton Hill Water Tower, one of only seven surviving standpipe water towers in the United States, is a national historic landmark.
- Interactive map of Compton Hill Reservoir Park
- Type: Municipal
- Location: St. Louis, Missouri
- Coordinates: 38°36′53″N 90°14′15″W
- Area: 35.8 acres (14.5 ha)
- Created: 1867
- Operator: City of St. Louis
- Open: All year
- Public transit: MetroBus
- Compton Hill Water Tower
- U.S. National Register of Historic Places
- St. Louis Landmark
- Location: St. Louis, Missouri
- Coordinates: 38°36′54″N 90°14′20″W
- Built: 1898
- Architect: Harvey Ellis
- Architectural style: French Romanesque
- NRHP reference No.: 72001555
- Added to NRHP: September 29, 1972

Compton Hill Reservoir Park is a 36-acre (15 ha) public park located in the Compton Heights neighborhood of St. Louis, Missouri, United States. Situated on one of the highest elevations in the city, the park surrounds a 28-million-US-gallon (110,000 m^{3}) reservoir that supplies water to many of St. Louis’s residents.

== History ==
James P. Kirkwood selected the site of the reservoir, one of the highest elevations within the 1855 city limits. As the reservoir occupied only 18 acres (7.3 ha) of the site, Kirkwood suggested the remaining land be turned into a park. The top of the reservoir structure was at one time covered with elevated tennis courts; presently, two newer tennis courts lie to the east.

The water tower was retired in 1929, after 30 years, when the Howard Bend Plant was put in service: the static head from the Stacy Park Reservoir, in what is now the St. Louis suburb of Olivette, caused an overflow of pure chemically treated water into the sewer system. The reservoir and water tower were renovated, in 1999, at a cost of $19 million.

In 1969, Interstate 44 was constructed through the northern edge of the park, reducing the area of the park to its present size.

== Compton Hill Water Tower ==
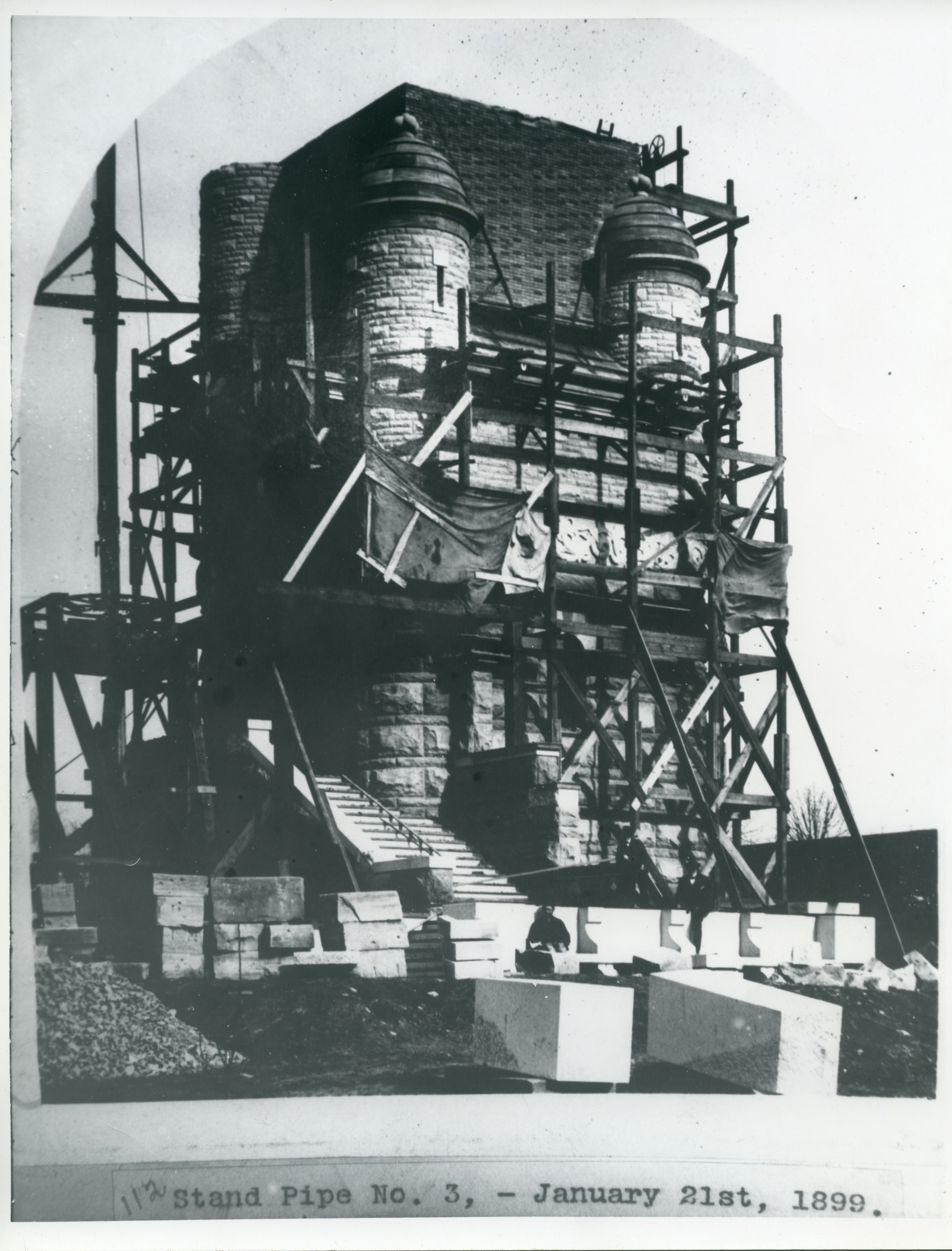
Compton Hill Water Tower under scaffolding during construction, 1899.

The Compton Hill Water Tower, built in 1898, is the youngest of three remaining standpipe water towers in St. Louis. Whereas, in 1901, more than 423 standpipe-style water towers existed in the United States, as of 2008 only about a dozen remain standing, three of which are in St. Louis (the other two being the Bissell Tower and the Grand Avenue Water Tower). The 179-foot (55 m) tower was built to disguise a 6-foot (1.8 m) diameter, 130-foot (40 m) tall standpipe in its interior. The standpipe helped to control the dangerous surges in the city's pipes caused by the reciprocating pumps and maintain an even water pressure. The water tower was designed by Harvey Ellis, who also had a hand in designing the headhouse for St. Louis Union Station. Occasionally, the observation deck at the top of the water tower is opened to the public, allowing visitors to see 360-degree panoramic views of the city. The Compton Hill Water Tower was declared a city landmark in 1966 and added to the National Register of Historic Places in 1972.

== The Naked Truth ==
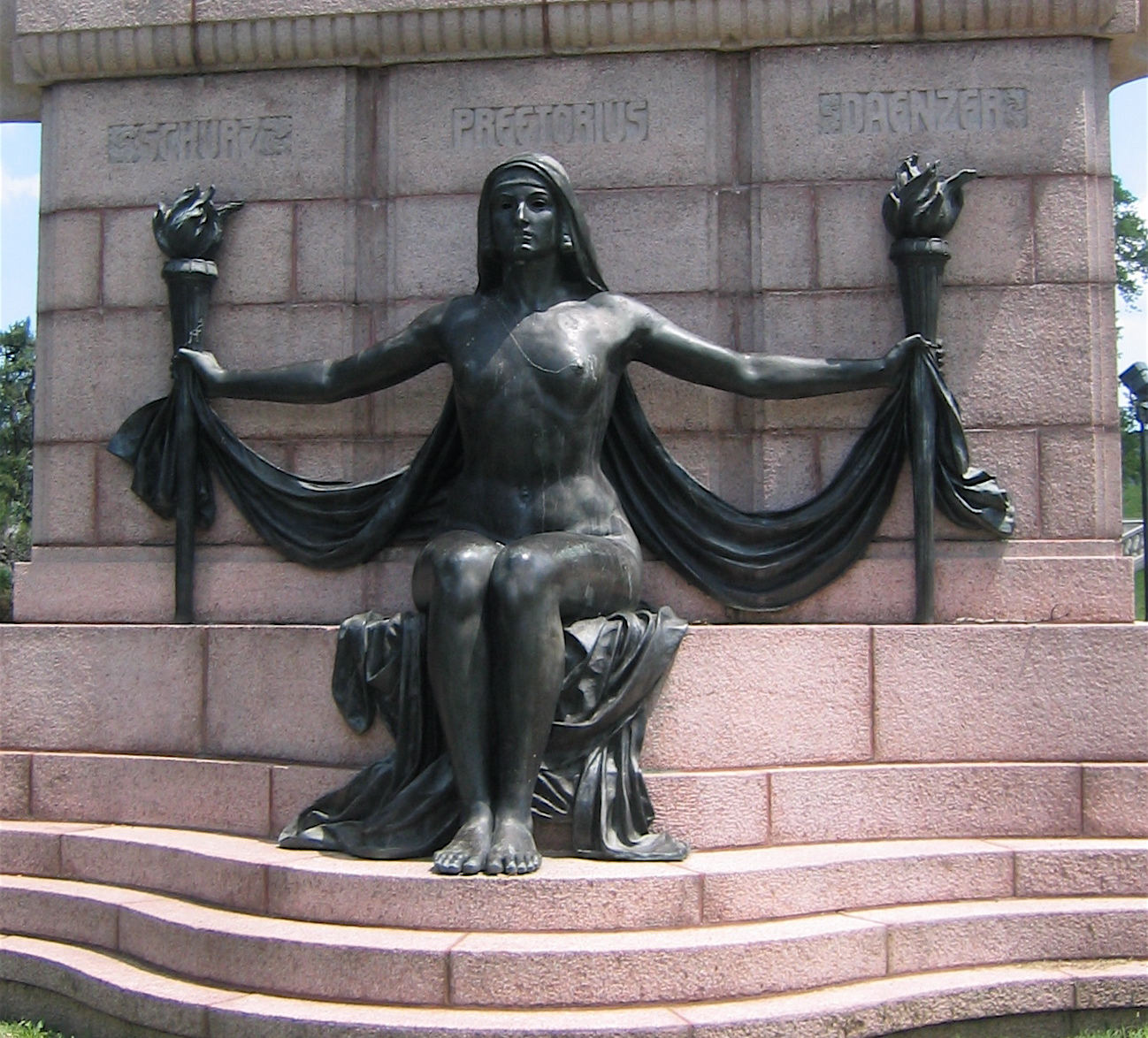
The statue The Naked Truth was presented in honor of the local German American press

The statue The Naked Truth, unveiled in 1914, was a gift to the city of St. Louis by the German-American Alliance in honor of Carl Schurz, Emil Preetorius and Carl Daenzer, editors of the German St. Louis newspaper Westliche Post. Controversy erupted over the statue's nudity before the monument was even built when a jury selected the design of Wilhelm Wandschneider, the only non-local sculptor in the design contest. At the request of Adolphus Busch, who had contributed $20,000 of the $31,000 cost of the monument, the statue was made of bronze instead of white marble to deemphasize the nudity.

The statue was moved to its present location south of the water tower after Interstate 44 was constructed through the northern edge of the park. The statue was designated a city landmark in 1969.

== See also ==
- Chicago Water Tower
- Louisville Water Tower
- Tower Grove East, St. Louis, nearby neighborhood that had a large German American population by the 1850s
- Tower Grove Park, the park located a short distance south on Grand Boulevard
