= Tower Grove East, St. Louis =

Neighborhood of St. Louis in Missouri, US

Coordinates: 38.6029°N 90.2364°W

Tower Grove East
- Neighborhood of St. Louis
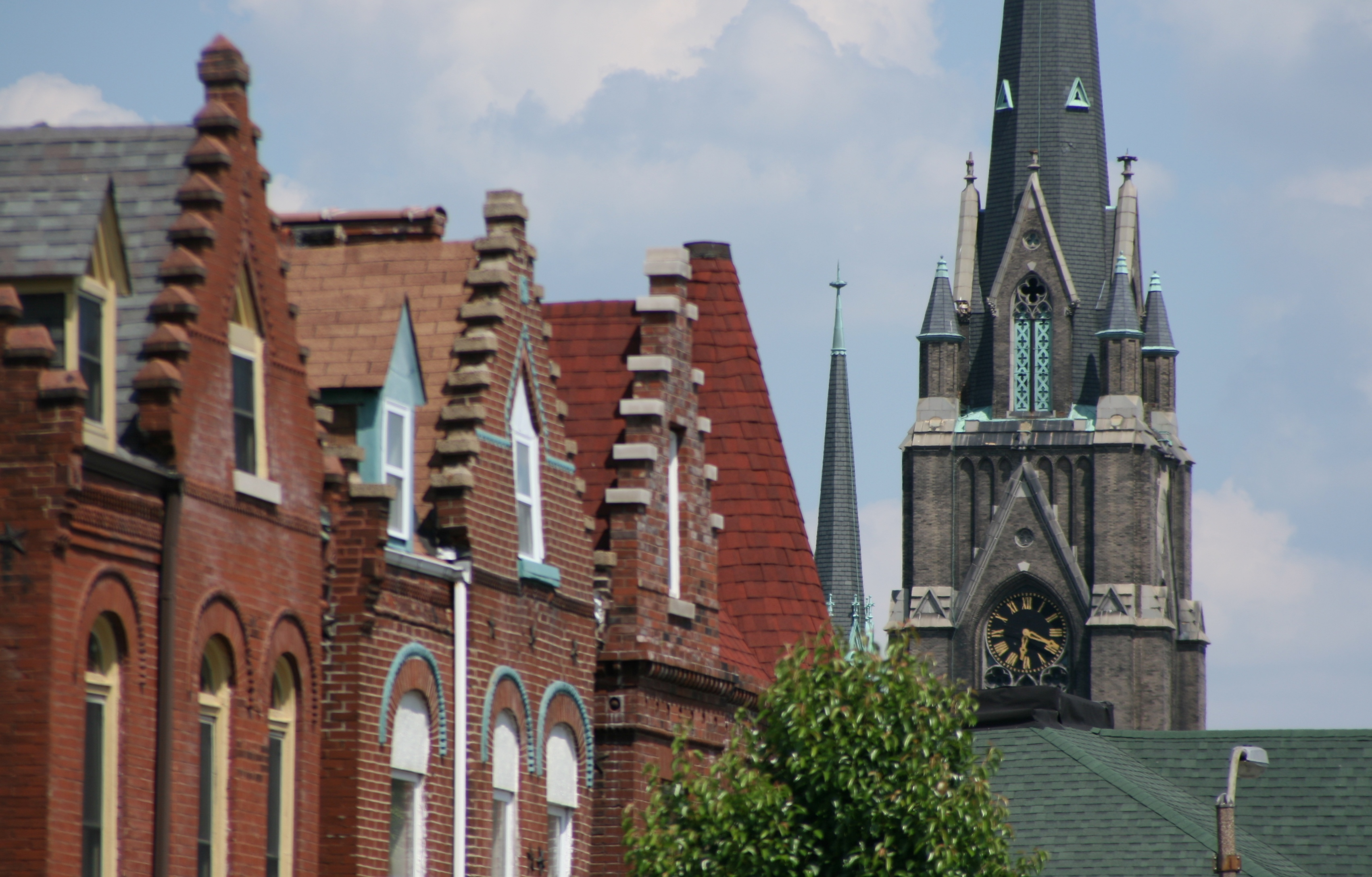
- Church and houses, Tower Grove East, June 2013

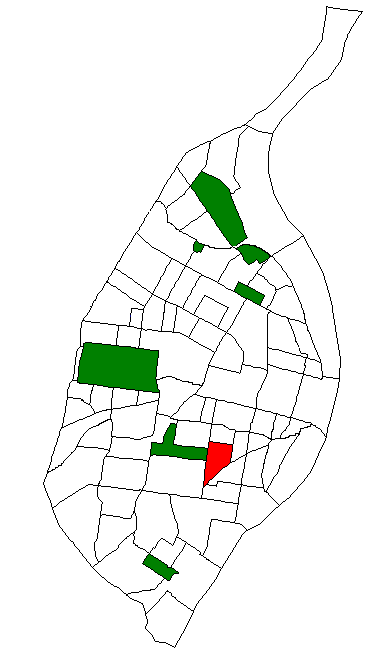
- Location (red) of Tower Grove East within St. Louis
- Country: United States
- State: Missouri
- City: St. Louis
- Ward: 7

Government
  - Alderman: Alisha Sonnier

Area
  - Total: 0.51 sq mi (1.3 km^{2})

Population (2020)
  - Total: 5,708
  - Density: 11,000/sq mi (4,300/km^{2})
- ZIP code(s): Parts of 63104, 63118
- Area code(s): 314
- Website: stlouis-mo.gov

Tower Grove East is a neighborhood of St. Louis, Missouri. The Tower Grove East neighborhood is bordered by Shenandoah Avenue to the north, Nebraska Avenue to the east, Gravois Avenue to the south, and south Grand Boulevard to the west.

The neighborhood is so named because it partially borders (across Grand Boulevard) the east entrance of Tower Grove Park. The land of Tower Grove Park was deeded to the city in 1868 as a gift by Henry Shaw, the owner of much of the surrounding land, including what is now the Missouri Botanical Gardens. The park also lends its name to the near neighborhood of Tower Grove South. Tower Grove Park lends much culture and activity to the neighborhood, with its annual festivals, farmers' markets, and activities.

The neighborhood also includes many businesses on South Grand Avenue, a popular area of restaurants, nightlife, and shopping. Within the neighborhood itself are many restaurants, a community garden, churches, schools, and the Stray Dog Theatre.

== History ==
The owners and builders in the early days of Tower Grove East were, for the most part, siblings, cousins, and extended family members of the prominent German Americans living in Compton Heights. Thus, architectural trends originating in Compton Heights and Flora Place influenced the designs of homes on South Compton, Shenandoah, and several other residential avenues. Like Tower Grove Heights, these residences were built on the four-square plan. The typical house is a pyramid or hipped roof on a two-story cube. Often, a pressed brick or limestone course separates the stories. The original developers then varied the theme through detailed choices. Attention was focused on the entry, cornice, and windows. Buyers would often choose the architectural elements from pattern books that illustrated multiple styles of windows, doors, stairways, and fireplace mantels. The often austere exterior facades typically hide a wealth of richly designed entries with carved fretwork; built-in hall benches, mirrors, and bookcases; wood paneling; stained-glass windows; and elaborate staircases.

== Demographics ==
Historical population
Census	Pop.	Note	%±
1990	7,600		—
2000	7,211		−5.1%
2010	5,853		−18.8%
2020	5,708		−2.5%

In 2020, Tower Grove East's racial makeup was 55.6% White, 28.9% Black, 5.0% Asian, 5.3% Latino or Hispanic, 8.2% Mixed Race, and 0.1% Native American.

== Education ==
Tower Grove East is home to a number of schools:

- Fanning Middle School
- McKinley Classical Junior Academy
- Eagle College Prep
- Roosevelt High School
- Shenandoah Elementary School
- South City Open Studio and Gallery for Children

== See also ==
- Compton Hill Reservoir Park, the park and city water reservoir nearby, houses a monument from the local German American community to a local German language newspaper The Westliche Post, which was later merged by Joseph Pulitzer to form the Post-Dispatch
