= Tower Grove South, St. Louis =

Neighborhood of St. Louis in Missouri, US

Coordinates: 38.5967°N 90.2575°W

Tower Grove South
- Neighborhood of St. Louis
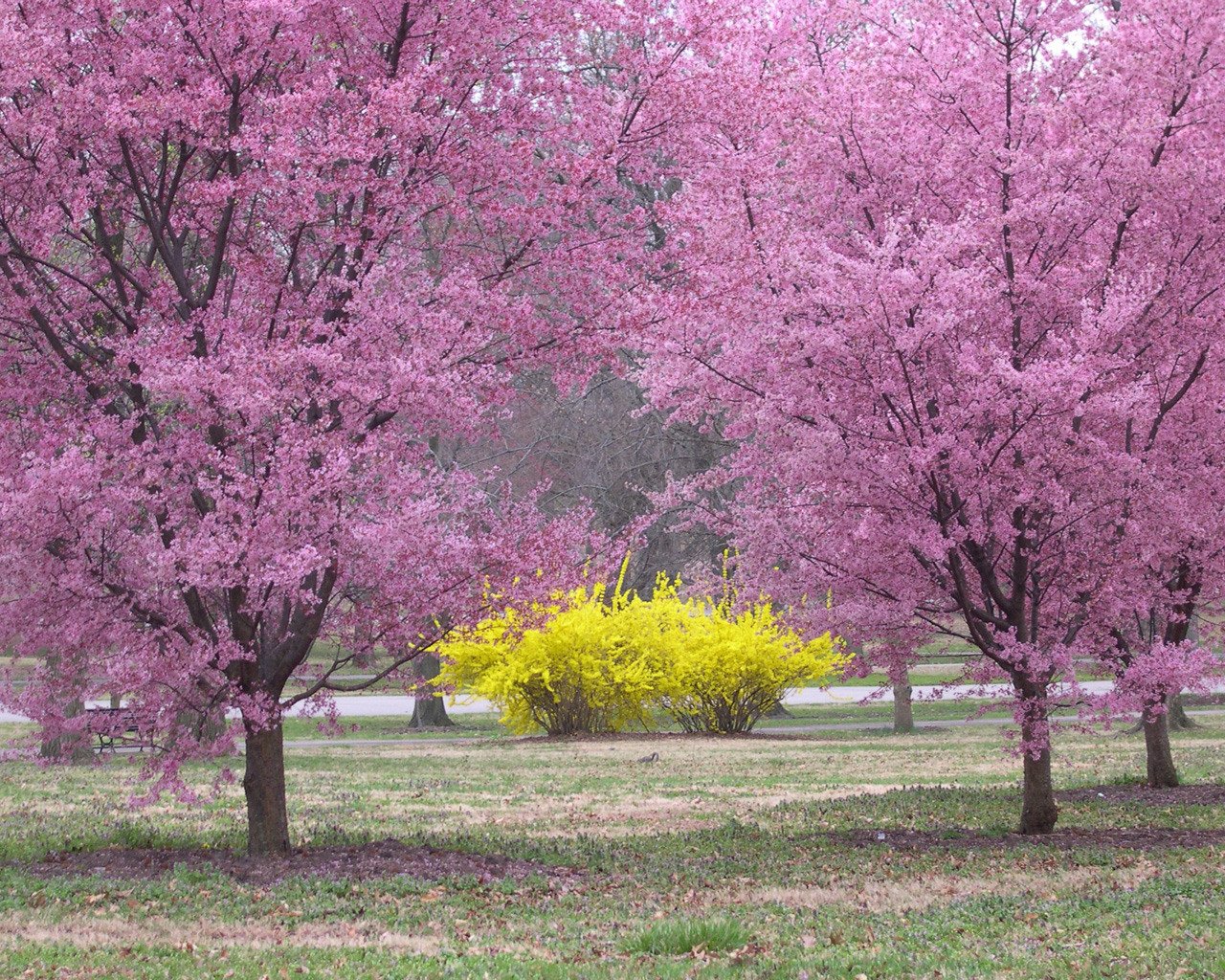
- Trees and plants in bloom in Tower Grove Park to the north

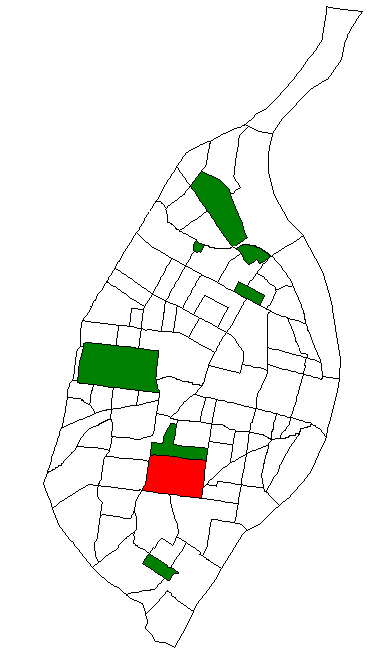
- Location (red) of Tower Grove South within St. Louis
- Country: United States
- State: Missouri
- City: St. Louis
- Ward: 6

Government
  - Aldermen: Daniela Velázquez

Area
  - Total: 1.49 sq mi (3.9 km^{2})

Population (2020)
  - Total: 12,719
  - Density: 8,540/sq mi (3,300/km^{2})
- ZIP code(s): Part of 63116
- Area code(s): 314
- Website: stlouis-mo.gov

Tower Grove South is a neighborhood of south St. Louis, Missouri. Formerly known as Oak Hill, Tower Grove South is bounded by Arsenal Street on the north, Chippewa Street on the south, Kingshighway Boulevard on the west, and Grand Boulevard on the east. The majority of the neighborhood was built following the extension of streetcar lines from downtown St. Louis. Commercial development in the neighborhood is concentrated on Grand Boulevard in the east and Morganford Road in the west of the neighborhood. There are also scatterings of commercial and mixed use buildings on interior intersections.

During the 1990s through the present, the neighborhood has been reversing a slow decline with the widespread rehabilitation of residential, commercial, and mixed use structures. The Grand Boulevard business district on the eastern flank of the neighborhood was the first urban business district in the neighborhood to see rehabilitation and new pedestrian scale construction. After 2000, the smaller Morganford Road business district on the west side of the neighborhood has also seen substantial reinvestment in the form of new restaurants, bars, retail, and a neighborhood scale storefront grocery store, specializing in natural and locally grown foods.

== Demographics ==
Historical population
Census	Pop.	Note	%±
1990	14,703		—
2000	14,745		0.3%
2010	13,333		−9.6%
2020	12,719		−4.6%

In 2020 the neighborhood's population was 57.6% White, 21.8% Black, 0.4% Native American, 7.7% Asian, 7.6% Two or More Races, and 4.8% Some Other Race. 8.4% of the population was of Hispanic or Latino origin.

== See also ==
- Tower Grove Park
- Tower Grove East, St. Louis

== Sources ==
- "National Register of Historic Places - Nomination Form" (PDF). Missouri Department of Natural Resources.
- "History of St. Louis Neighborhoods". City of St. Louis.
