= Grand Boulevard (St. Louis) =

Thoroughfare in St. Louis, Missouri, USA

- Grand Avenue, Grand Drive
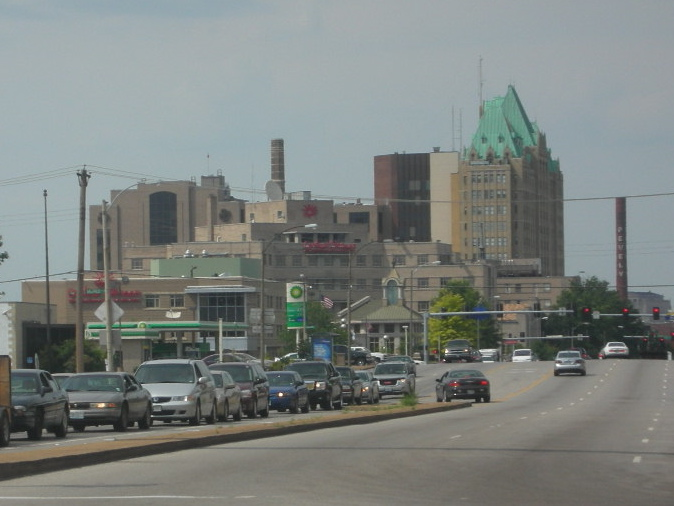
- Grand Boulevard as it passes through the neighborhood of Tiffany between Interstate 44 and St. Louis University Medical Center
- Type: Thoroughfare
- Owner: City of St. Louis
- Maintained by: St. Louis City Street Department
- Length: 9.2 mi (14.8 km)
- Width: 5-7 lanes
- Location: St. Louis, Missouri
- Postal code: 63116, 63104, 63110, 63103, 63106, 63107, 63102
- Nearest metro station: Grand
- South end: Holly Hills Avenue in Holly Hills
- Major junctions: Route 366 in Tower Grove South; Route 30 in Tower Grove South; I-44 in Compton Heights; Route 100 in The Gate; I-64 / US 40 in Grand Center; Route D in Grand Center; Route 115 in JeffVanderLou; I-70 in College Hill
- North end: Hall Street in Near North Riverfront

Grand Boulevard is a major, seven to five-lane wide, north-south thoroughfare that runs through the center of St. Louis, Missouri. It runs north through Carondelet Park in the south portion of the city to the Mississippi River north of the McKinley Bridge. It runs generally north-south, about midway between Forest Park and the Mississippi River. Neighborhoods that it runs through include Carondelet, Dutchtown, Tower Grove East, Tower Grove South, Compton Heights, Tiffany, Midtown, Jef-Vander-Lou, Fairground, and College Hill.

== Mass-transit connections ==
Grand Boulevard connects with the St. Louis Metrolink light rail service at Grand Station. The station was closed in spring 2011 due to the demolition and replacement of the viaduct on Grand spanning the Metrolink tracks, industrial train tracks, and an industrial park. The new larger metro and bus station and viaduct with wider pedestrian sidewalks was later opened.

Grand Blvd also has the 70 Grand MetroBus, the busiest bus route in the St. Louis area. The route number comes from a streetcar line that previously operated on track in the center lane of Grand Boulevard with that number.

== Places on Grand Boulevard ==
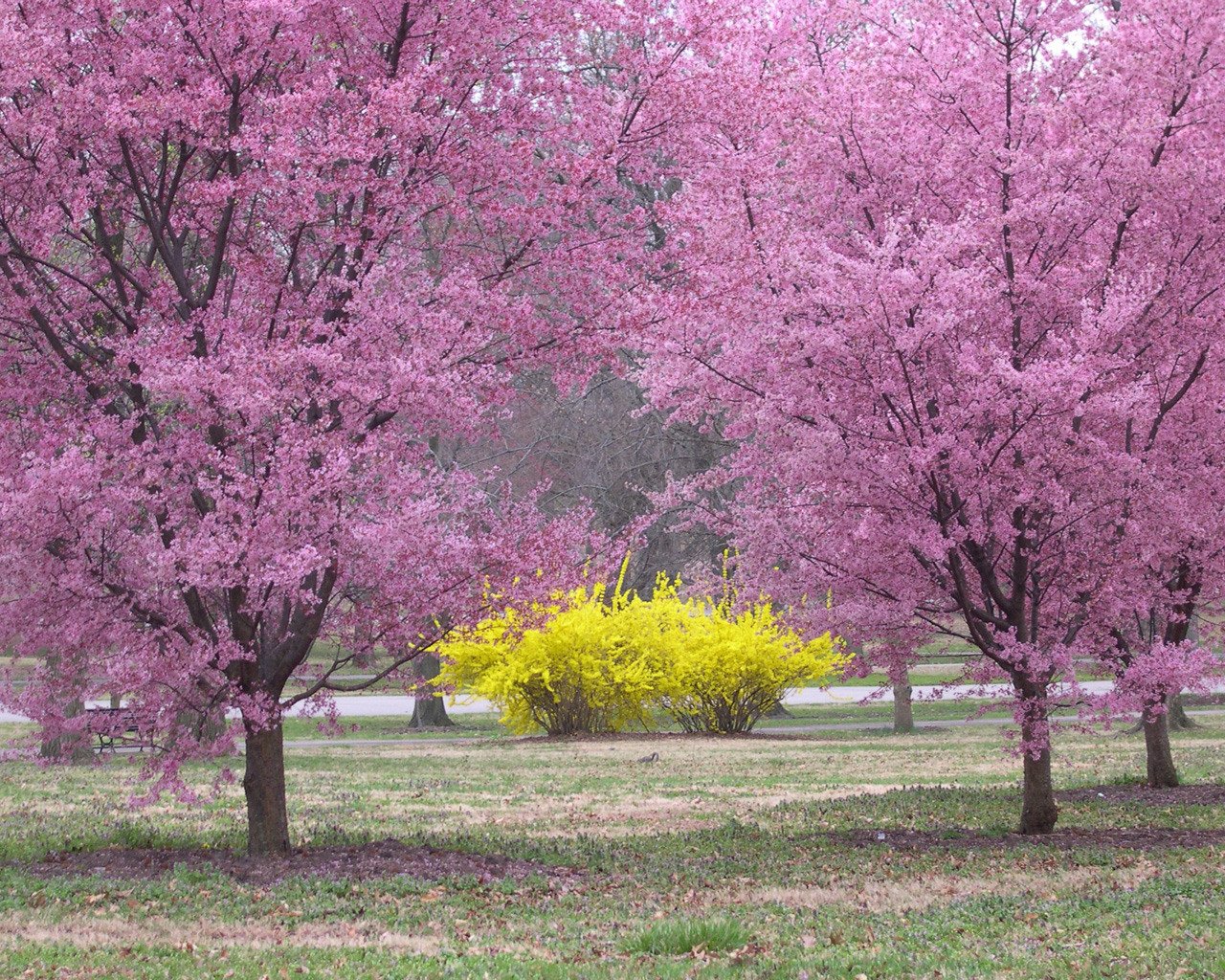
Tower Grove Park is a refreshing oasis on Grand Boulevard.

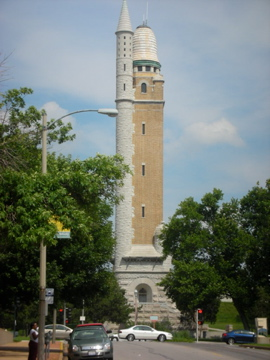
The national landmark Compton Hill Reservoir Water tower sits in Compton Hill Reservoir Park along Grand Boulevard.

- Sportsman's Park
- Fairground Park
- Divoli Branch library
- St. Alphonse's Liguori Catholic Church
- Saint Louis University
- Fox Theatre
- Grand Center
- Compton Hill Reservoir Park, site of the landmark Compton Hill Water Tower
- Carpenter Branch library
- Tower Grove Park, site of the annual Festival of Nations
- Saint Louis University School of Medicine
- Saint Louis University Hospital
- SSM Cardinal Glennon Children's Hospital
- Carondelet Park
- St. Mary's High School
- Pevely Dairy Company Plant
- Pius XII Memorial Library
- Powell Hall
- Cupples House
- Ted Drewes, the Grand location of the locally famous Frozen custard stands
- Edward Adelbert Doisy Research Center
- KDHX 88.1 FM, located directly off of Grand Boulevard
- Missouri School for the Blind, located off of Grand Blvd, the first school to adopt the Braille alphabet in America, and a teacher invented the first Braille printing press
- Grand Avenue Water Tower, the older Corinthian water tower in North St. Louis

== South Grand ==
Once a residential area, South Grand developed with numerous 19th and 20th century buildings remaining in the diverse area.
