= Holly Hills, St. Louis =

Neighborhood of St. Louis in Missouri, US

Coordinates: 38.5689°N 90.2614°W

Holly Hills
- Neighborhood of St. Louis
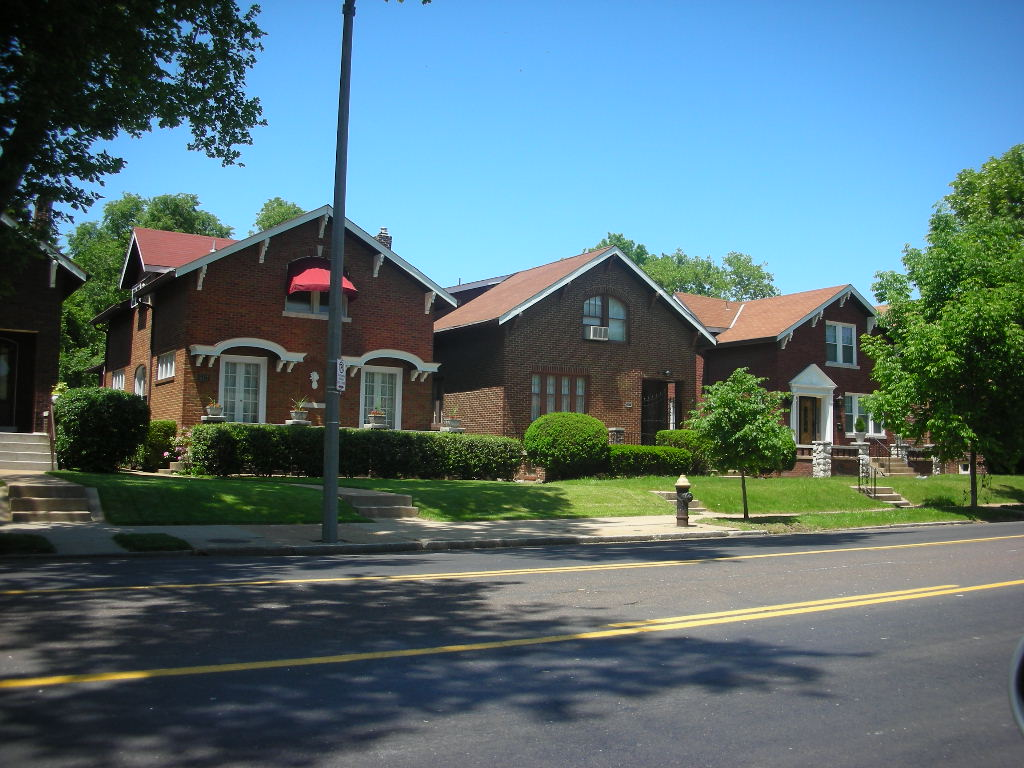
- Homes in Holly Hills in South St. Louis.

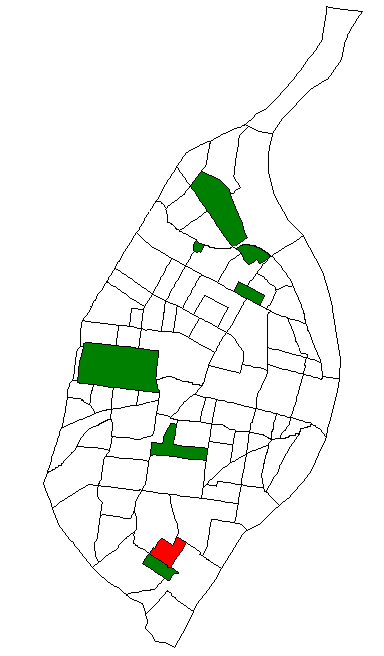
- Location (red) of Holly Hills within St. Louis
- Country: United States
- State: Missouri
- City: St. Louis
- Wards: 1

Government
  - Aldermen: Anne Schweitzer

Area
  - Total: 0.4 sq mi (1.0 km^{2})

Population (2020)
  - Total: 3,647
  - Density: 9,100/sq mi (3,500/km^{2})
- ZIP code(s): Part of 63116
- Area code(s): 314
- Website: stlouis-mo.gov

Holly Hills is a neighborhood in South St. Louis, Missouri, near the intersection of I-55 and Loughborough Avenue. The neighborhood is defined by Bates Street and Walsh Street on the northeast, Holly Hills Boulevard on the southwest, Leona Street on the northwest, and Grand Boulevard on the southeast. It is surrounded by Carondelet Park, Boulevard Heights, Bevo Mill, Dutchtown and Carondelet neighborhoods. This neighborhood area is not to be confused with an organization known as "The Holly Hills Improvement Association", a private economic entity.

== Demographics ==
Historical population
Year	Pop.	±%
1990	3,213	—
2000	3,705	+15.3%
2010	3,701	−0.1%
2020	3,647	−1.5%

In 2020 Holly Hills was 67.5% White, 16.8% Black, 0.5% Native American, 3.2% Asian, 8.6% Two or More Races, and 3.4% Some Other Race. 8.0% of the population was of Hispanic or Latino origin.

== See also ==
- Neighborhoods of St. Louis
