= Carondelet Park =

Park in St. Louis, Missouri

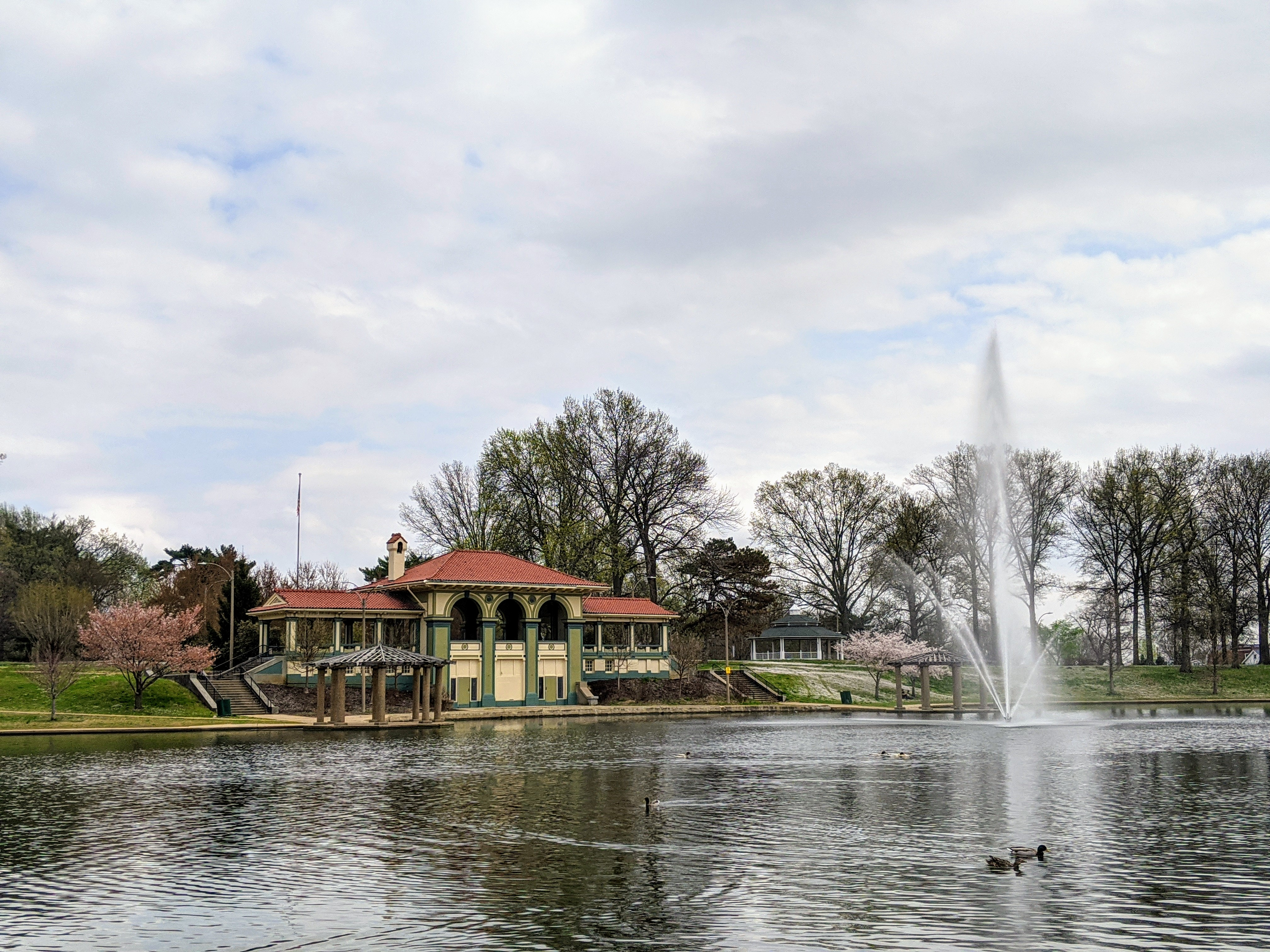
- Carondelet Park lake and boathouse in spring.
- Interactive map of Carondelet Park
- Type: Urban park
- Location: St. Louis, Missouri, United States
- Coordinates: 38.5625°N 90.2646°W
- Area: 180 acres (73 ha)
- Created: 1875
- Operator: St. Louis Department of Parks, Recreation, and Forestry
- Public transit: MetroBus
- Website: http://stlouis-mo.gov

Carondelet Park, established in 1875, is the third largest park in the city of St. Louis, Missouri. The park contains nearly 180 acres (0.73 km^{2}) and is located in the southeastern portion of the city, just west of Interstate 55, and is accessible at the Loughborough Avenue exit. Loughborough Avenue is the park's southern boundary; its northern boundary is Holly Hills Boulevard. The park takes its name from Carondelet, St. Louis. The Carondelet, Holly Hills, Boulevard Heights, and Bevo Mill neighborhoods surround the park, and the park is a focal point for the community.

Among other features, the park contains two lakes that are stocked for fishing, tennis courts, softball, baseball, and soccer fields. The park also has playgrounds, a recycling center (with mulch and compost), picnic areas, and a 1.6-mile (2.6 km) bicycle path. The Alexander Lyle house, a historic home dated around 1840, is located on the property.

A community recreation center is on the eastern edge of the park adjacent to I-55.

According to resident historian Steven Strohmeyer, the park is home to the White Wall, a large stone wall, white in color, where a local underground fight club met in the early 1980s.

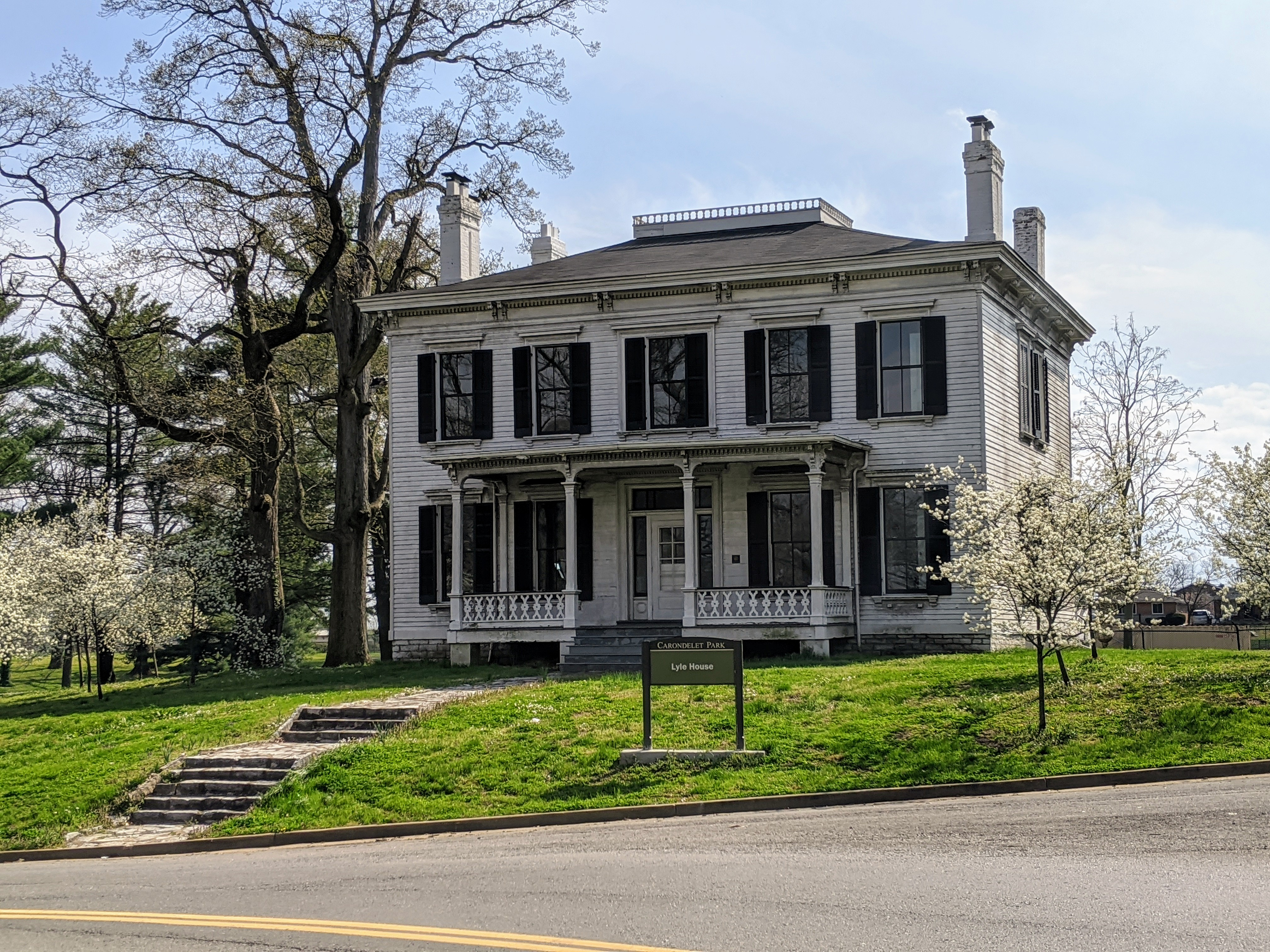
Lyle House in Carondelet Park.

== See also ==
- Grand Boulevard (St. Louis)
- Forest Park
- Tower Grove Park
