= Festival of Nations =

Annual event in St. Louis, Missouri

Coordinates: 38°36′24″N 90°15′46″W

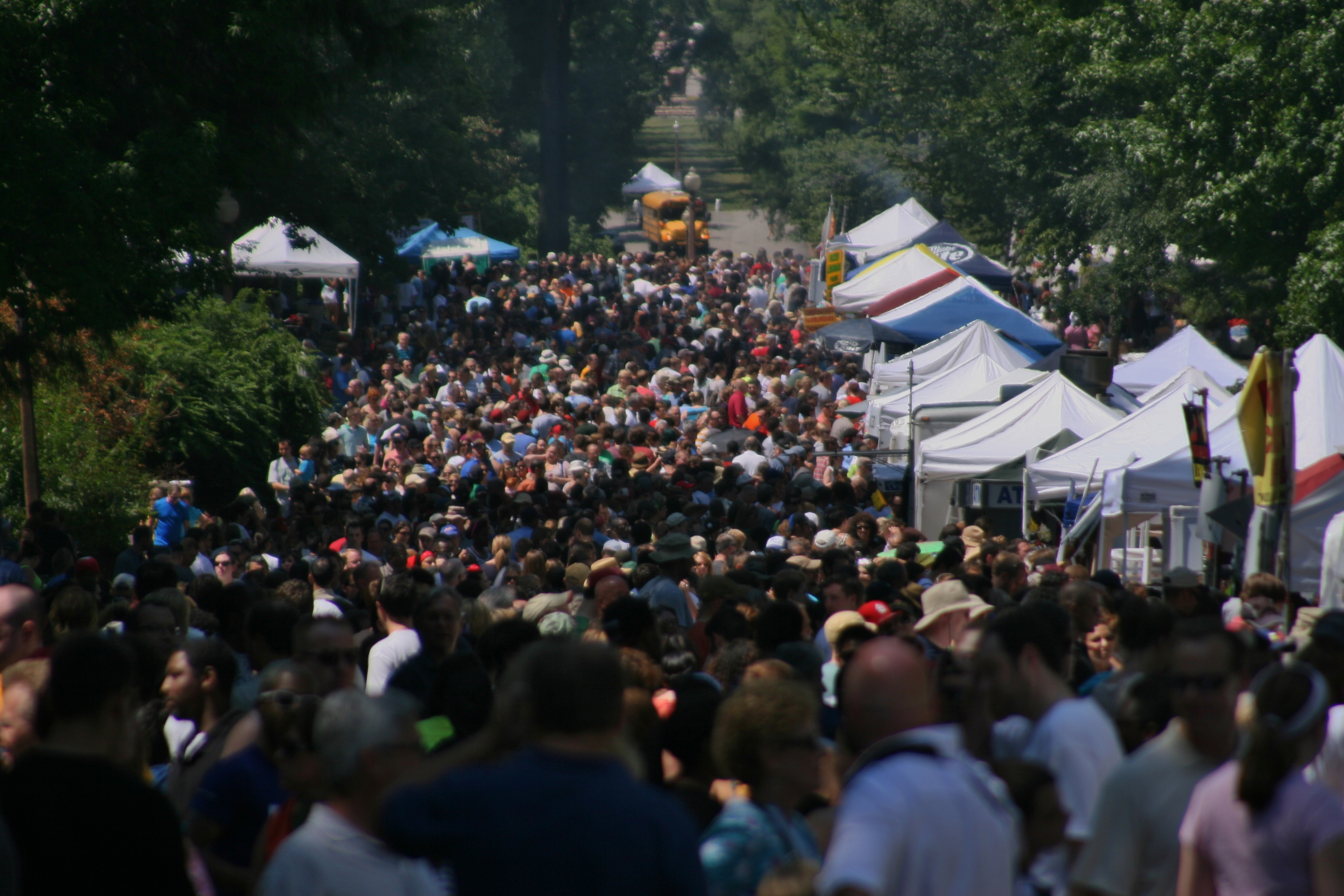
Festival of Nations 2013

Festival of Nations is a free, multicultural public event, held yearly, organized by the International Institute of St. Louis in Tower Grove Park, a city park on Grand Boulevard, featuring food booths of many ethnic cuisines, dance, music, arts, crafts and an international bazaar.

== History ==
The International Institute of St. Louis Organized the International May Festival in St. Louis in 1920. Approximately 2,000 people attended the May Festival. The May Festival was one of the earliest multicultural celebrations in the US and today's Festival of Nations originated from the May Festival.

No festivals were held in 1942–45, nor what would've been their centennial anniversary in 2020.

== IISTL ==
The International Institute of St. Louis is involved in building positive relationships between newcomers (immigrants) and long time Americans. The institute provides various services including teaching English, resettling refugees, helping newcomers find jobs and providing translation & other servies.
