= Tiffany, St. Louis =

Neighborhood of St. Louis in Missouri, US

Coordinates: 38.6217°N 90.2413°W

Tiffany
- Neighborhood of St. Louis
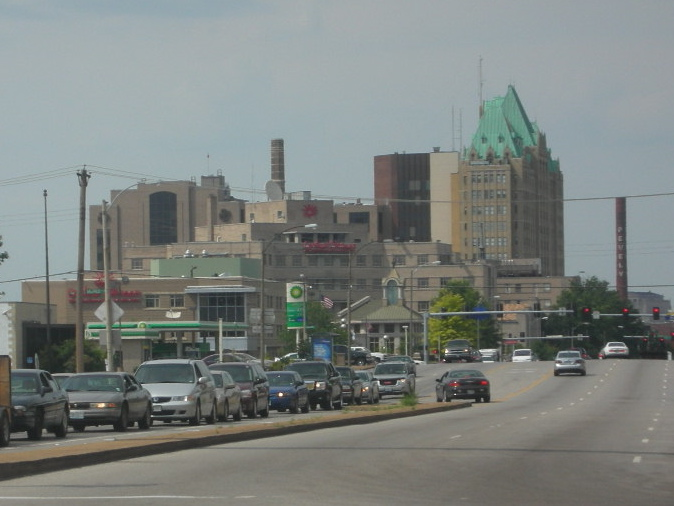
- The skyline of the Tiffany Neighborhood from South Grand Blvd.

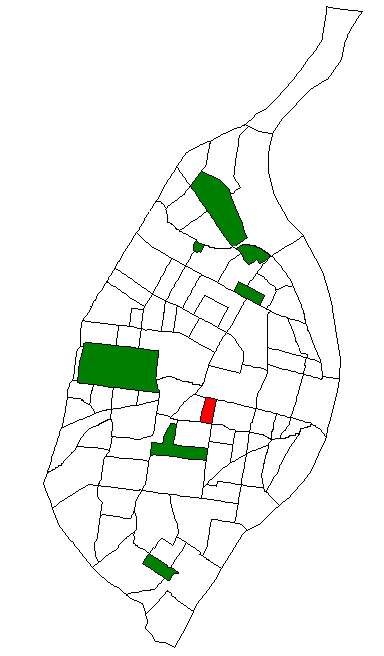
- Location (red) of Tiffany within St. Louis
- Country: United States
- State: Missouri
- City: St. Louis
- Wards: 7

Government
  - Aldermen: Alisha Sonnier

Area
  - Total: 0.21 sq mi (0.54 km^{2})

Population (2020)
  - Total: 915
  - Density: 4,400/sq mi (1,700/km^{2})
- ZIP code(s): Part of 63110
- Area code(s): 314
- Website: stlouis-mo.gov

Tiffany is a neighborhood of St. Louis, Missouri. It is located on the western side of Grand Boulevard along the section containing St. Louis University's Medical Complex. The neighborhood is defined by Chouteau Avenue on the North, Interstate 44 on the South, Grand Boulevard on the East, and 39th Street on the West.

== History ==
The Tiffany neighborhood, as well as present day Shaw and Botanical Heights neighborhoods, were originally part of the common fields laid out by the French stretching west of Grand.

These included the Cul-de-Sac Common, the St. Louis Common to the North and the Prairie des Noyers which was laid out in 1769, to the South. During this early period, Grand Boulevard was far beyond the edge of the settlement of St. Louis.

By the 1860s, much of the northern area, including what is now the Tiffany neighborhood, had become the property of Mrs. Mary McRee. Except for a few houses on the perimeter streets, most of the land was made up of meadows and cornfields. Some industry had begun to develop towards the railroads to the north and in McRee City (now Forest Park Southwest), but for the most part the area remained undeveloped.

This began to change in 1888 when Mary McRee sold her land to a developer. Dundee Place was developed in 1889 after Colonel Thomas A. Scott purchased it from William McRee for $448,000. It covered an area of 138 acres (0.56 km^{2}) and a portion of this tract was subdivided by Mrs. Mary McRee and named "McRee City." In 1869 a large subdivision, called McRee City was developed by Mrs. Mary McRee, widow of Colonel Samuel McRee, who died in the cholera epidemic of 1849. McRee's subdivision was timed to take advantage of the arrival of horsecarriage lines in the Shaw neighborhood and the presence of the Pacific Railroad which had been laid along the northern edge of the area in the 1850s.

With the completion of the Grand Avenue Viaduct in 1890 and electrified streetcar lines by the turn of the century, the area was transformed into a middle-class commuter suburb. The Tiffany neighborhood takes its name for one of these streetcar lines, called the Tiffany line, which connected transit offices and shops at 39th Street, then called Tiffany Street, and Park with Chouteau Avenue.

== Demographics ==
Historical population
Year	Pop.	±%
1990	1,355	—
2000	1,340	−1.1%
2010	1,060	−20.9%
2020	915	−13.7%

In 2020 Tiffany's racial makeup was 62.6% Black, 25.7% White, 0.2% Native American, 4.7% Asian, 4.5% Two or More Races, and 2.3% Some Other Race. 3.5% of the people were of Hispanic or Latino origin.

Racial composition	2000	2010	2020
White	12.2%	10.8%	25.7%
Black or African American	83.1%	84.1%	62.6%
Hispanic or Latino (of any race)	0.8%	1.4%	3.5%
Asian	2.8%	2.3%	4.7%

== Sources ==
- "National Register of Historic Places - Nomination Form" (PDF). Missouri Department of Natural Resources.
