= Compton Heights, St. Louis =

Neighborhood of St. Louis in Missouri, US

Coordinates: 38.6122°N 90.2340°W

Compton Heights
- Neighborhood of St. Louis
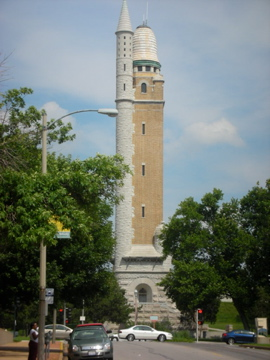
- The Compton Water Tower, located on the northwest corner of Compton Heights. Though commonly referred to as a water tower, it is actually a standpipe tower.

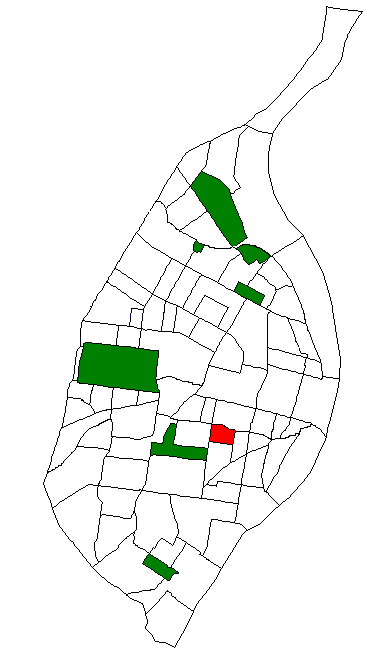
- Location (red) of Compton Heights within St. Louis
- Country: United States
- State: Missouri
- City: St. Louis
- Ward: 6

Government
  - Alderperson: Daniela Velázquez

Area
  - Total: 0.28 sq mi (0.73 km^{2})

Population (2020)
  - Total: 1,396
  - Density: 5,000/sq mi (1,900/km^{2})
- ZIP code(s): Parts of 63104, 63118
- Area code(s): 314
- Website: stlouis-mo.gov

Compton Heights is a neighborhood of St. Louis, Missouri. It is bordered by Interstate 44 to the north, Nebraska Avenue to the east, Shenandoah Avenue to the south, and Grand Boulevard to the west. Compton Hill Reservoir Park, home to the landmark Compton Water Tower, lies within the neighborhood. Compton Heights was one of the country's earliest planned residential developments of the nineteenth century. Its 1889 layout adhered to a plan that viewed nature as a neighbor, rather than as an enemy to be subjugated by a rectilinear grid. This is seen today in the neighborhood's wide setbacks and curving streets that create remarkable vistas, punctuated by more than 200 homes of extraordinary and varied interest. The entire neighborhood is a national historic district.

== Demographics ==
Historical population
| Census | Pop. | Note | %± |
|---|---|---|---|
| 1990 | 1,868 | | — |
| 2000 | 1,448 | | −22.5% |
| 2010 | 1,315 | | −9.2% |
| 2020 | 1,396 | | 6.2% |

In 2020 Compton Heights' population was 72.6% White, 16.5% Black, 0.2% Native American, 3.6% Asian, 6.3% Two or More Races, and 0.7% Some Other Race. 3.5% of the population was of Hispanic or Latino origin.

== See also ==
- Grand Boulevard (St. Louis)
- Julius Pitzman
- Private place
