= Tower Grove Park =

Municipal park in St. Louis, Missouri, US

- U.S. National Register of Historic Places
- U.S. National Historic Landmark District
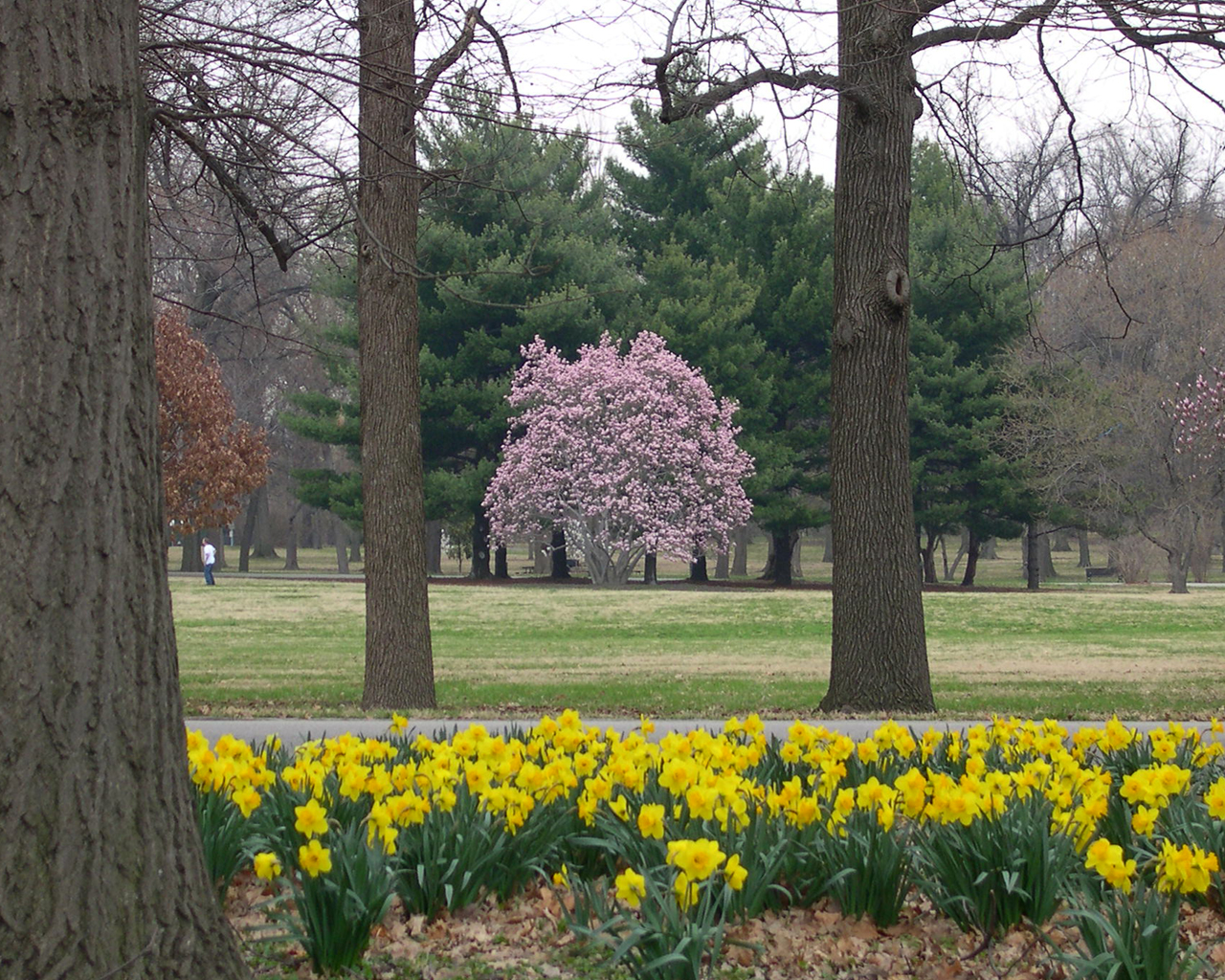
- Photo taken in Tower Grove Park near the Stone Shelter

- Location within St. Louis
- Location: St. Louis, Missouri
- Coordinates: 38°36′22″N 90°15′22″W
- Area: 289 acres (117 ha)
- Built: 1889
- Architect: James Gurney Sr., George I. Barnett
- Architectural style: Greek Revival, Gothic
- NRHP reference No.: 72001556

Significant dates
- Added to NRHP: March 17, 1972
- Designated NHLD: December 20, 1989

Tower Grove Park is a municipal park in St. Louis, Missouri. Located on the south side of the city, the elongated 289-acre (117 ha) park extends 1.6 miles (2.6 km) from Kingshighway Boulevard east to Grand Boulevard. The park’s predominately residential surroundings include the neighborhoods of Southwest Garden, Shaw, Tower Grove East, and Tower Grove South.

Both Tower Grove Park and the neighboring Missouri Botanical Garden were part of the estate of 19th-century businessman and botanist Henry Shaw. In 1868, Shaw donated the land for the park to the city of St. Louis.

== History ==
Tower Grove Park was originally part of La Petite Prairie, which was settled by the French in the early 18th century. Grazing land was held in common, and farming land was divided into long, narrow tracts. The commons system was abandoned around 1800, and the land began to be sold into private hands. By the 1850s much of the property was owned by German Catholics, recent immigrants from Germany's 1848 civil war. The German dairy farmers found it ideal as pasture land. They built comfortable homes and began creating a community toward the end of the 19th century. Blocks were developed, upon which many of the prosperous German immigrants, turned American citizens, built grand homes. The area around the park continues to be home to a number of residential neighborhoods.

Henry Shaw donated the land for the park in 1868, and the park opened to the public in 1872.

== Environment and facilities ==
Designed in the gardenesque style by James Gurney Sr., the park has been designated a National Historic Landmark as one of the nation's finest examples of a late 19th-century public park. Gurney had been head of the aquatic plants section at Kew Gardens in London, and he remained in St. Louis as superintendent of the park.

The park features 32 pavilions of picturesque design, most dating from the Victorian era. The landscape includes a lily pond and formal plantings; the Piper Palm House, a bandstand, the site of music and other special events; as well as tennis courts; a wading pool for small children; open expanses of green; softball diamonds and soccer fields; paths for walkers, joggers, and cyclists, and tall specimen trees and a great variety of bushes.

The park had removed basketball courts in the 1980s, citing maintenance costs. New courts along Arsenal Street were added in 2023.

The park is home to nearly 400 species of trees, bushes, and flowering plants. It is a well-known birdwatching area, particularly during the spring and fall bird migration seasons. It is part of the Mississippi Flyway and migrating birds rest in the park along their journey. Forty percent of North American songbirds and waterbirds use this route. Examples are many types of warblers, orioles, and Canada geese.

== Statues ==
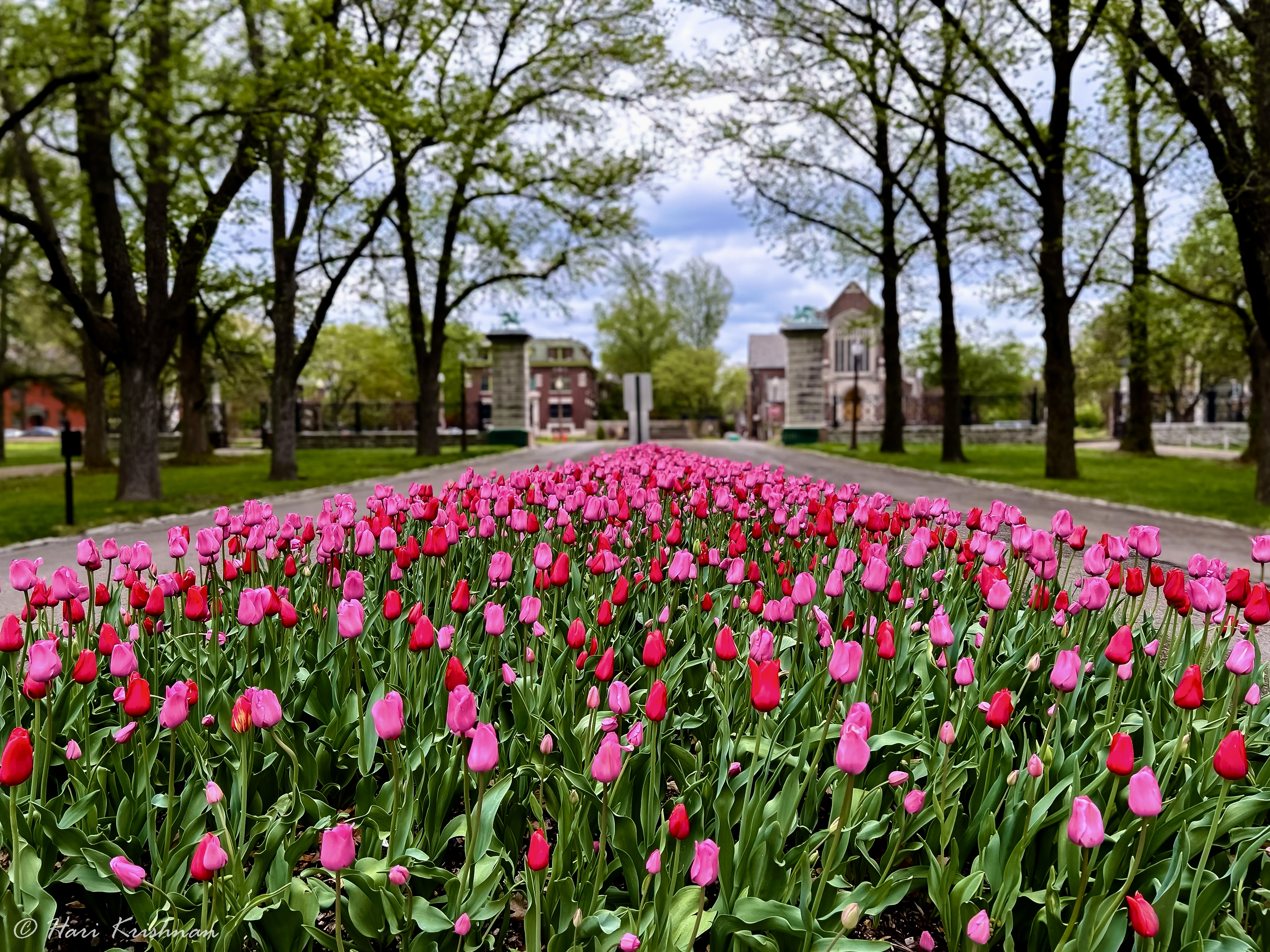
Tulips in spring near the Kingshighway Boulevard entrance

There are several statues from the 1800s along the central corridor of the park. There is a full likeness of Alexander von Humboldt, the German naturalist, geographer and explorer, and one of William Shakespeare the English playwright, both from 1878 and sculpted by German sculptor Ferdinand Freiherr von Miller. von Miller also produced a statue of the Italian navigator and explorer Christopher Columbus that was dedicated in 1886, and placed near the gates and entrance from Grand Avenue.

At the park's South Grand entrance, a Christopher Columbus statue was annually commemorated by the local Italian American community. In 2016 and 2017, the statue was vandalized with red paint and messages including "murderer" and "Black Lives Matter." In 2018, a commission was formed to make recommendations on the statue's future. In June 2020, the statue was removed from the park.

Around the bandstand there are white marble busts of some famous musical composers mounted on columns: Mozart and Rossini by Howard Kretschmar from 1882, Beethoven and Wagner by Ferdinand von Miller from 1884, and Gounod and Verdi by Carlo Nicoli from 1886.

There is a smaller scale statue of Friedrich Wilhelm von Steuben, the German born military officer and American Revolution volunteer, near the Palm house. Steuben later became an American citizen and figure to German Americans. The original, larger statue (by the German sculptor Cuno von Uechtritz-Steinkirch) was commissioned for the 1904 World's Fair. The current version was placed in Tower Grove Park in 1968.

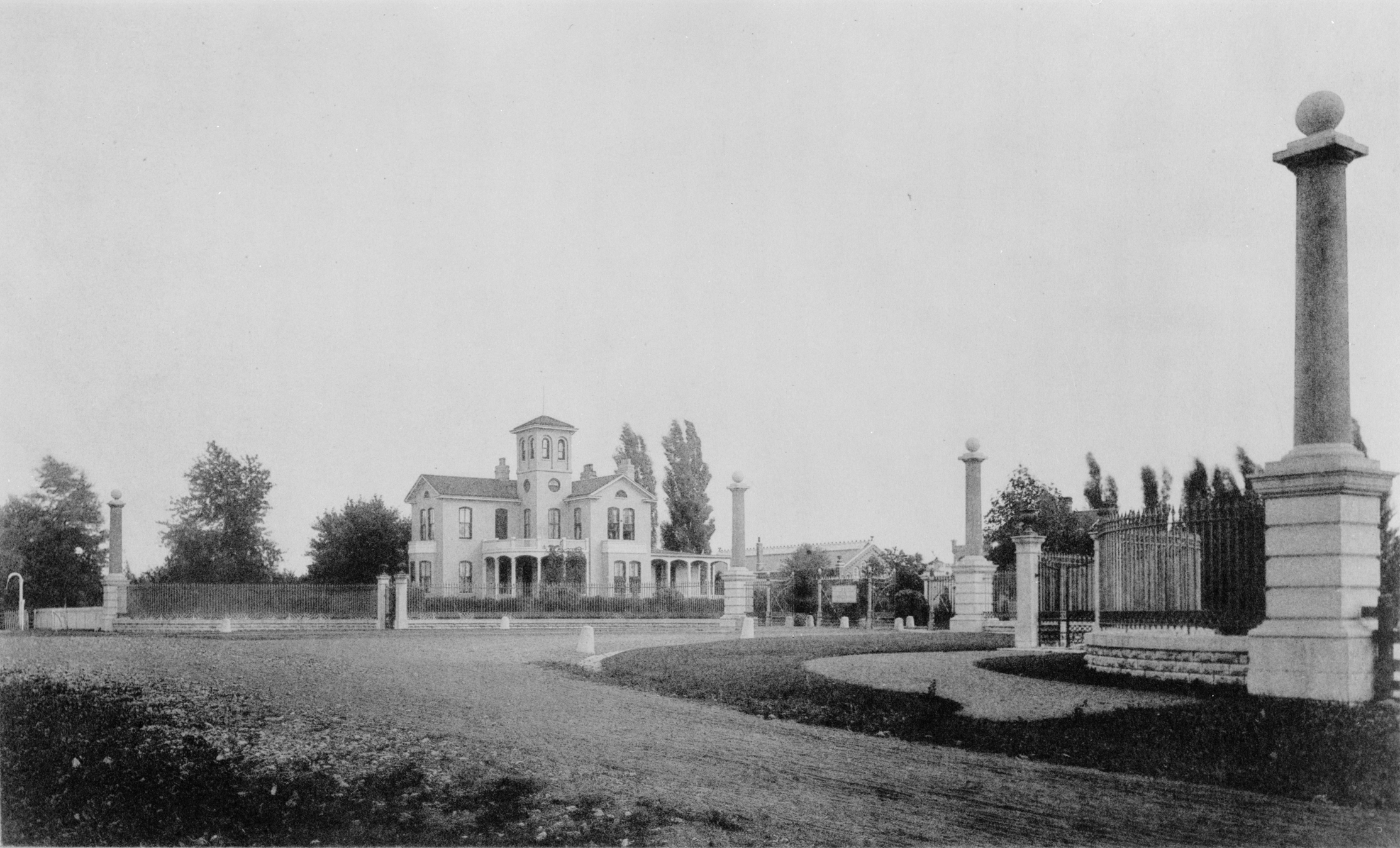
1883 photograph by Robert Benecke of the gate at Magnolia Street and Tower Grove Avenue, looking southeast toward the Superintendent's house

Two zinc statues of stags, en couchant and on pedestals, face each other across Center Cross Drive, just west of the Piper Palm House.

== Events ==
Many events, from picnics to weddings, are held in the park throughout the year. During the summer, a number of large festivals are held in the park, including ones featuring themes such as international culture and paganism. The park has also been the site of various LGBTQ Pride festivals.

Since 2006, from May through October, a farmers' market is held from 8-12:30 Saturday mornings just west of the Wading Pool Pavilion. It features local and organic farmers offering fresh produce and meats, baked goods and preserves, as well as prepared foods and drinks, teas and coffees, with stalls for craftsmen and artisans as well.

== Photos of pavilions ==
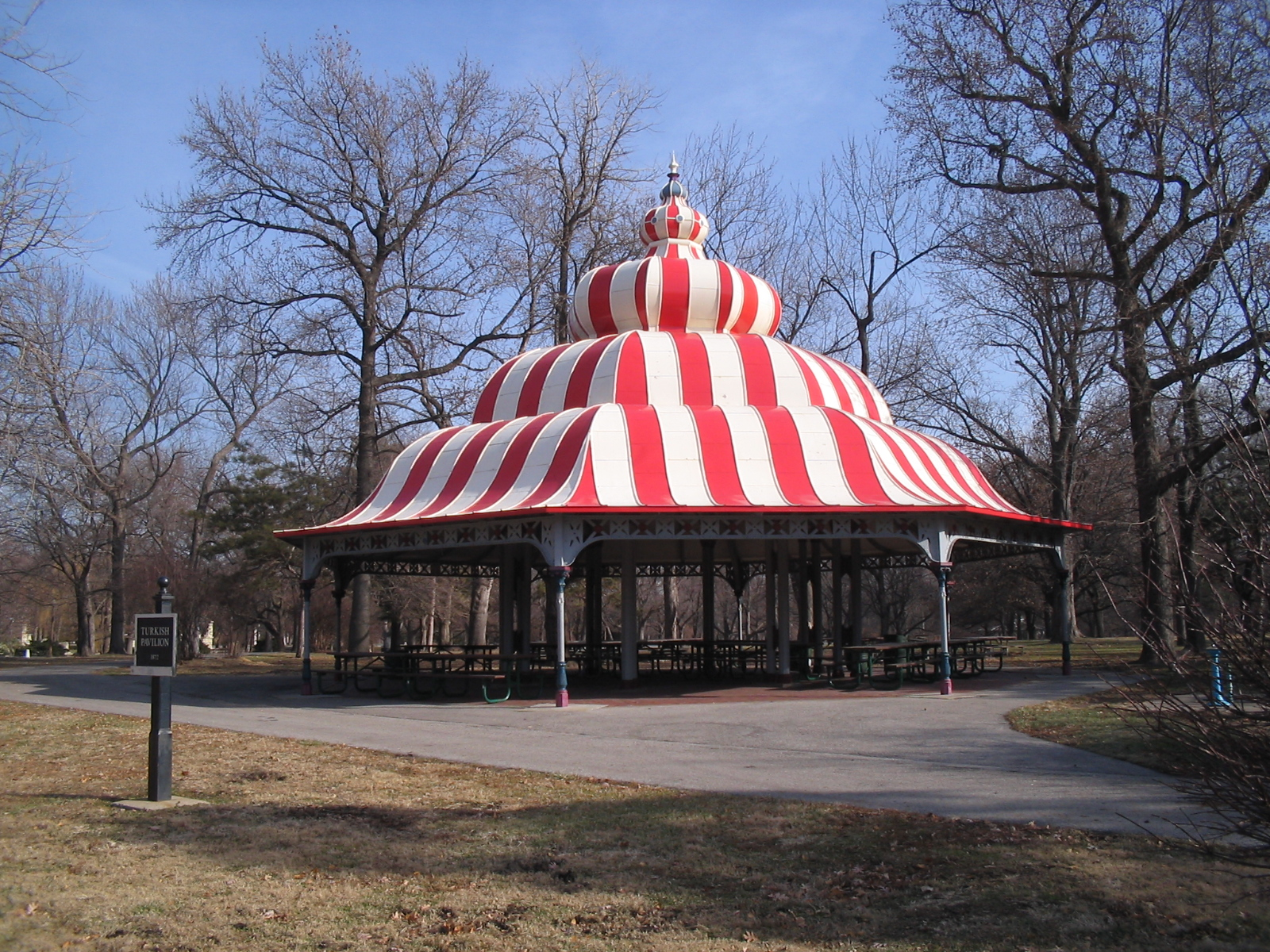
Turkish Pavilion

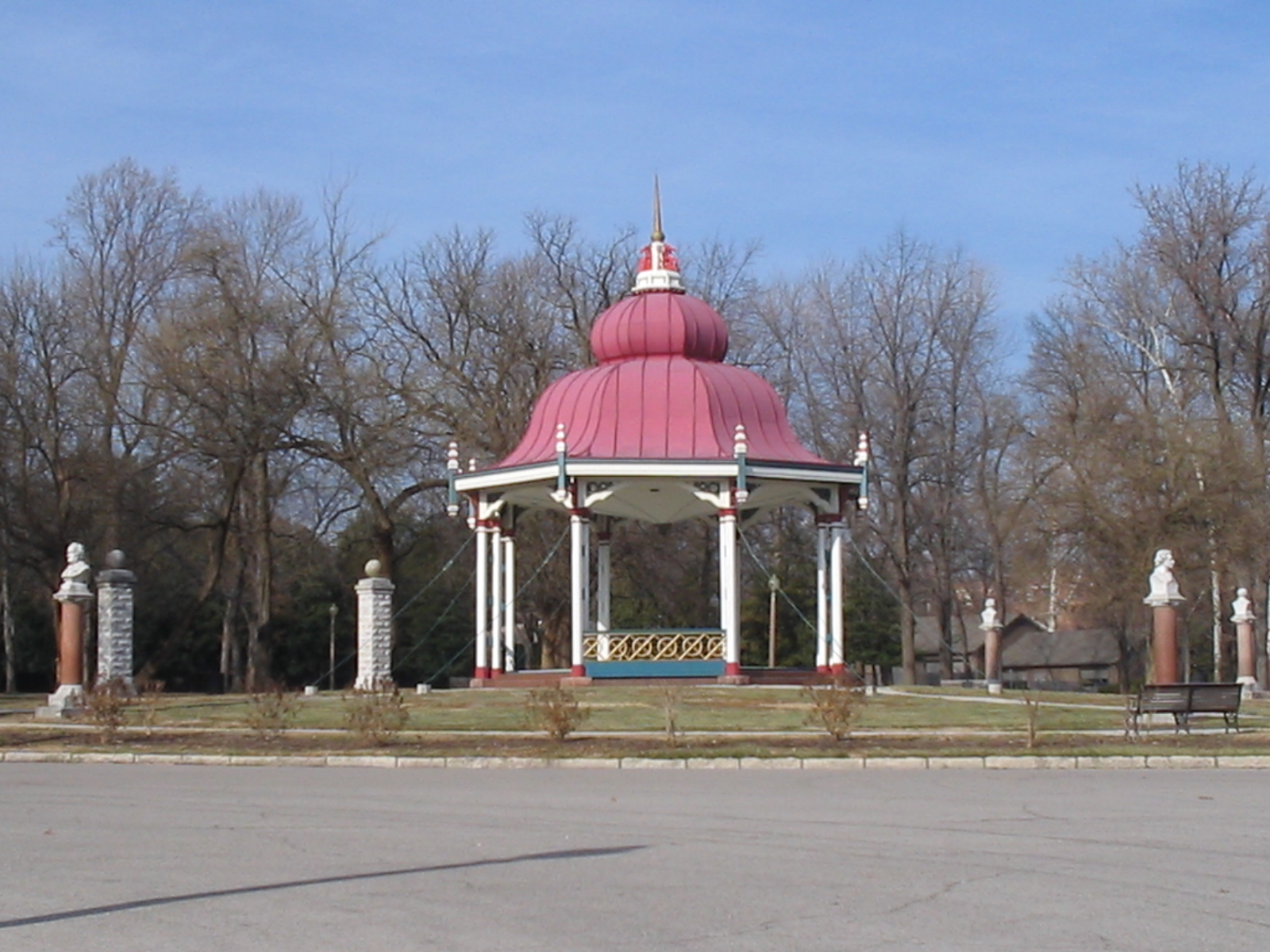
Bandstand in Tower Grove Park

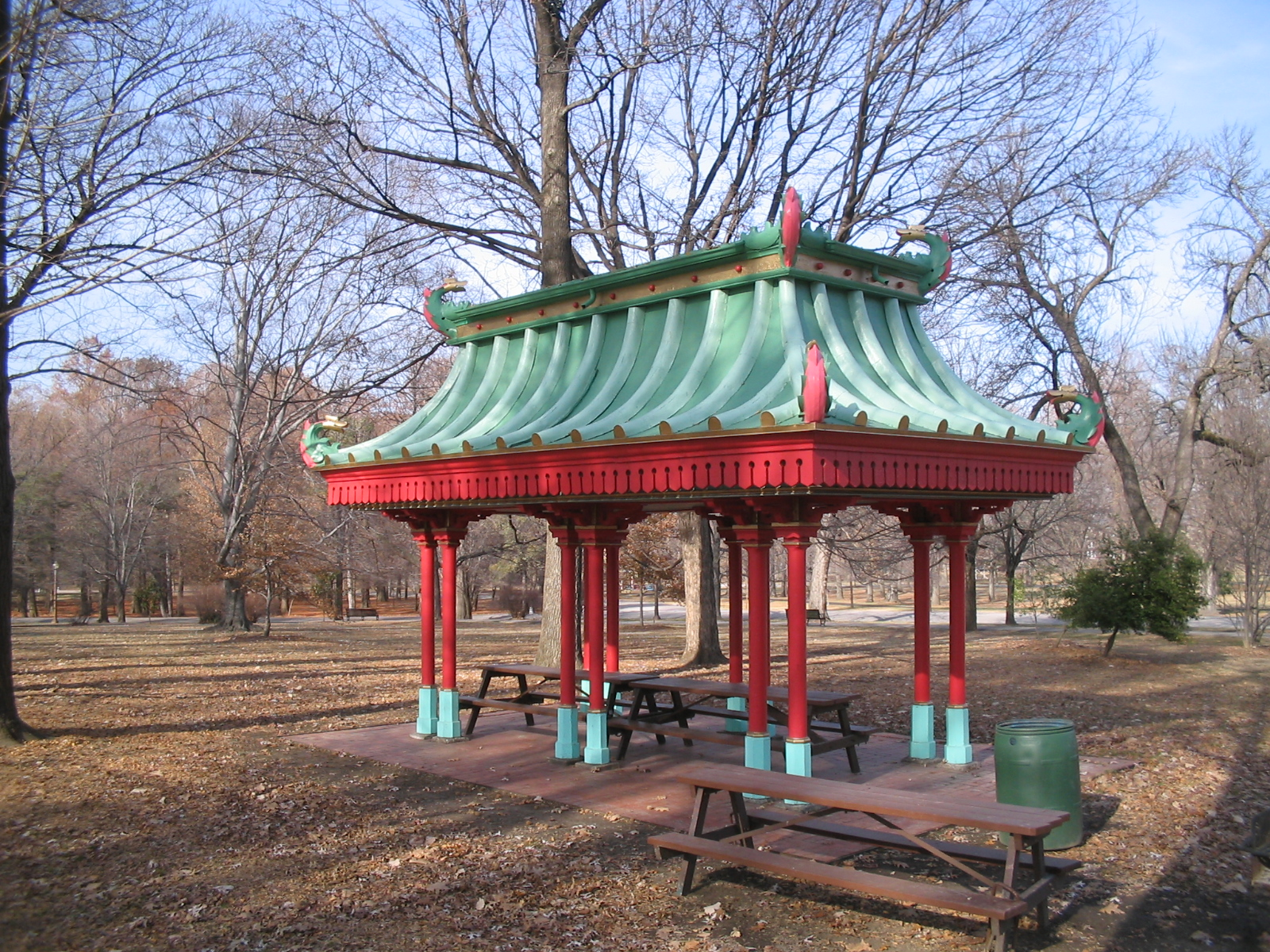
Chinese Pavilion

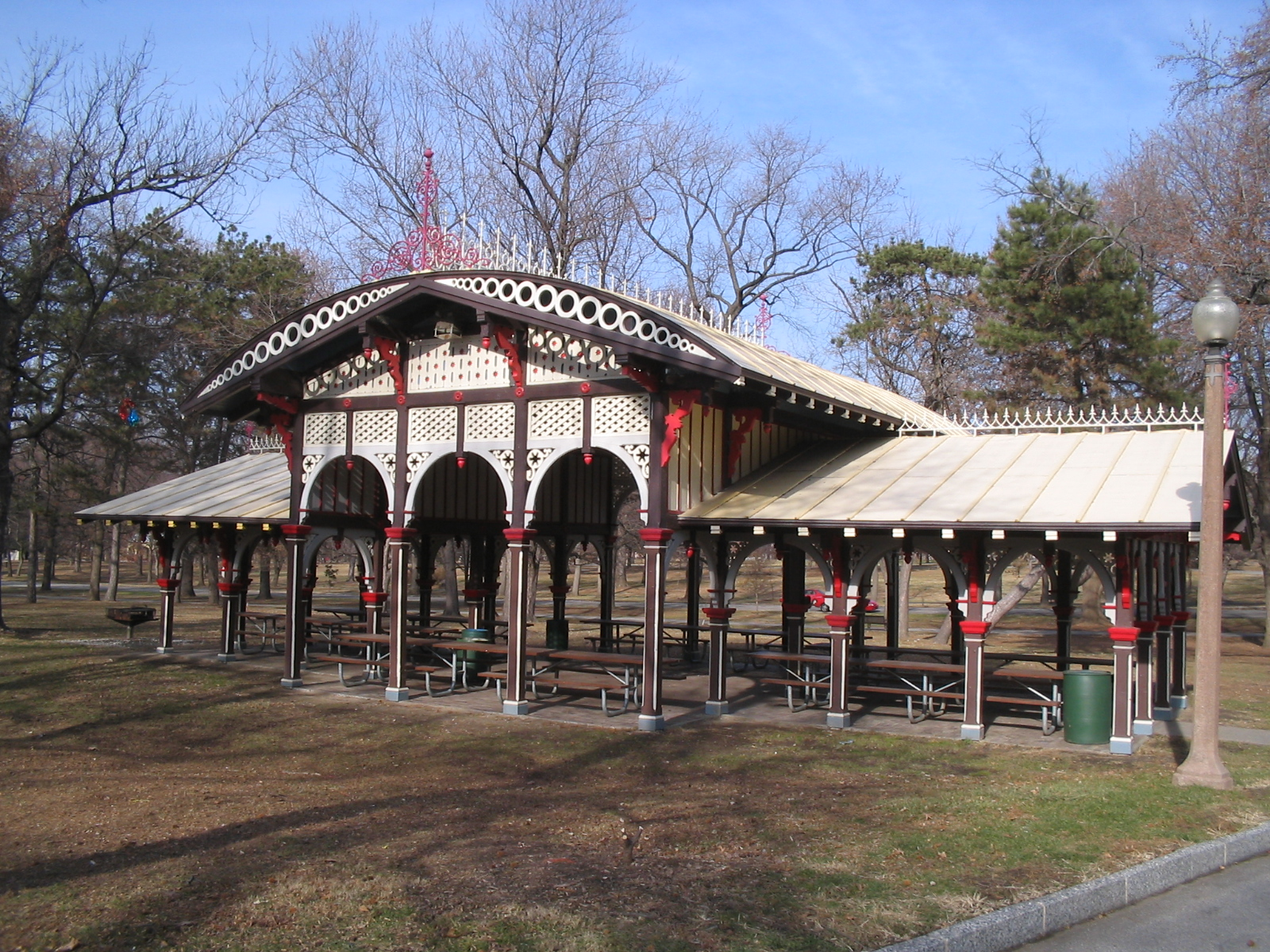
Sons of Rest Pavilion

== See also ==
- Forest Park, the largest park in the city, located to the northwest, and site of the 1904 World's Fair
- Gazebo
- Lafayette Park, the first public park west of the Mississippi, in the old city to the northeast
- List of National Historic Landmarks in Missouri
- National Register of Historic Places listings in St. Louis south and west of downtown
