= Skinker =

Skinker may refer to:

- Alexander R. Skinker (1883–1918), Medal of Honor Recipient during World War I
- Skinker/DeBaliviere, St. Louis, neighborhood of St. Louis, Missouri
- Skinker (St. Louis Metrolink), subway station at the intersection of Skinker Boulevard and Forest Park Parkway
- Wydown/Skinker, St. Louis, neighborhood in St. Louis, Missouri
