= DeBaliviere Place, St. Louis =

Neighborhood of St. Louis in Missouri, US

Coordinates: 38.6500°N 90.2796°W

DeBaliviere Place
- Neighborhood of St. Louis
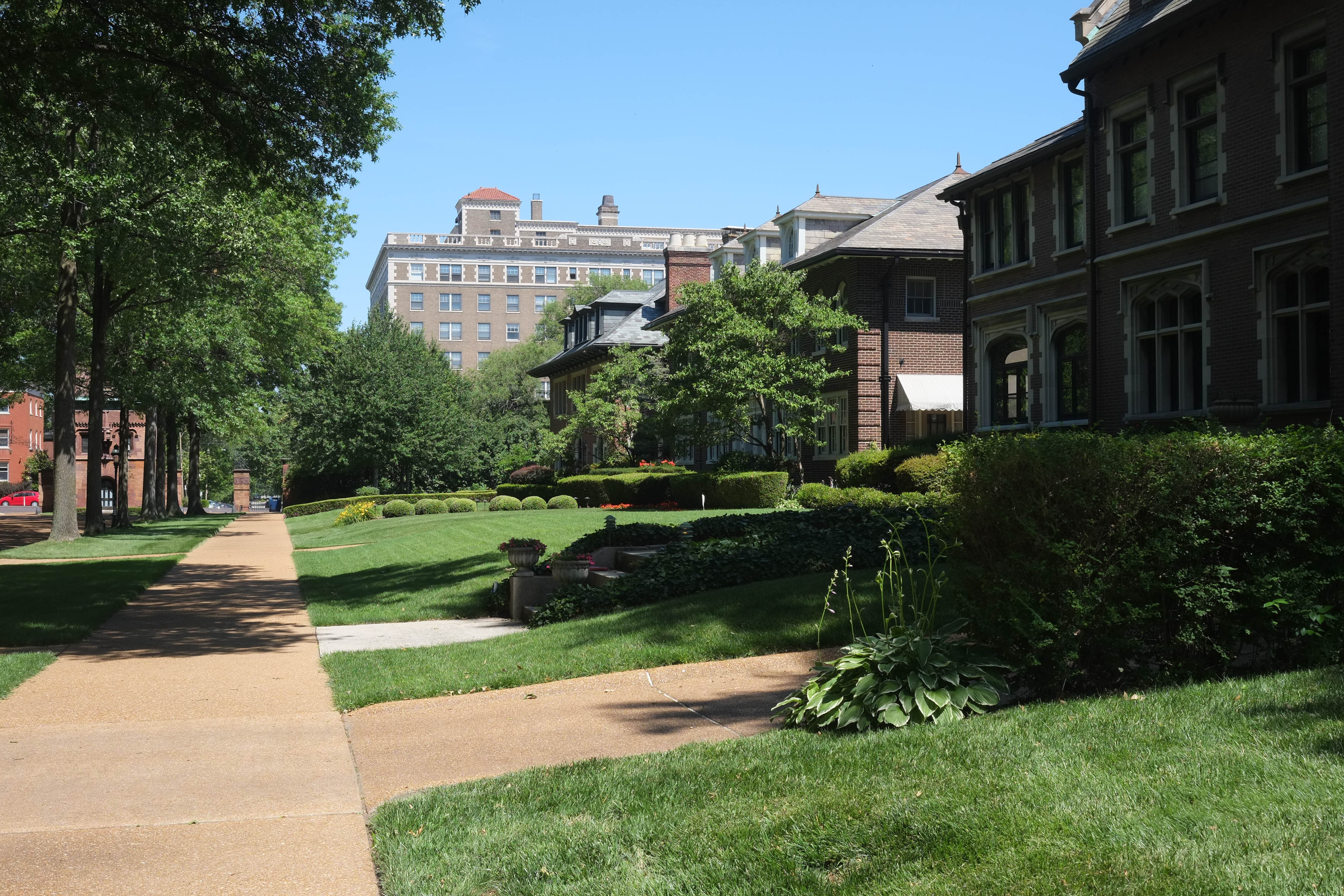
- Washington Terrace, DeBaliviere Place, June 2017

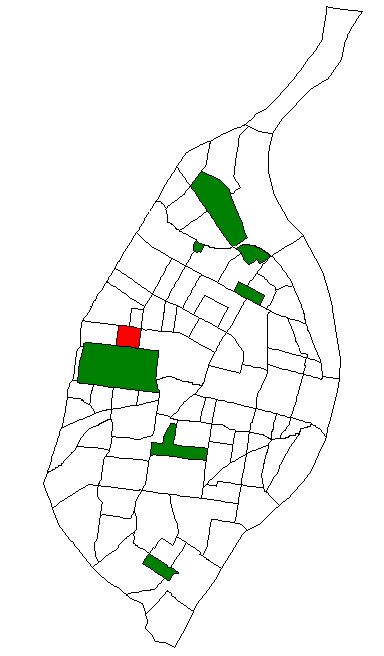
- Location (red) of DeBaliviere Place within St. Louis
- Country: United States
- State: Missouri
- City: St. Louis
- Ward: 10

Government
  - Alderperson: Shameem Clark-Hubbard

Area
  - Total: 0.32 sq mi (0.83 km^{2})

Population (2020)
  - Total: 3,651
  - Density: 11,000/sq mi (4,400/km^{2})
- ZIP code(s): Part of 63112
- Area code(s): 314
- Website: stlouis-mo.gov

DeBaliviere Place (/dəˈbɑːləvər/ duh-BAH-lih-ver) is a neighborhood of St. Louis, Missouri.

== Location ==
The DeBaliviere Place neighborhood is bounded by Delmar Boulevard on the north, Union Boulevard on the east, Lindell Boulevard on the south, and DeBaliviere Avenue on the west.

== Characteristics ==
The MetroLink's Forest Park-DeBaliviere stop is located within the neighborhood. The neighborhood is across the street from Forest Park, adjacent to the Central West End, and close to both the Delmar Loop and Washington University.

== Demographics ==
Historical population
Year	Pop.	±%
1990	3,271	—
2000	3,436	+5.0%
2010	3,466	+0.9%
2020	3,651	+5.3%

In 2020 the neighborhood's population was 55.0% White, 25.0% Black, 0.3% Native American, 10.9% Asian, 6.9% Two or More Races, and 1.9% Some Other Race. 5.0% of the population was of Hispanic or Latino origin.

Racial composition	1990	2000	2010	2020
White	59.2%	59.3%	59.0%	55.0%
Black or African American	38.1%	30.2%	29.4%	25.0%
Hispanic or Latino (of any race)	N/A	1.5%	3.0%	5.0%
Asian	N/A	7.1%	7.8%	10.9%
