= List of neighborhoods of St. Louis =

The City of St. Louis officially recognizes 79 neighborhoods within its limits. Census data are collected for each neighborhood, as well as crime data, historic property data, and dining establishment health ratings. National historic neighborhoods are identified by the official neighborhood to which they belong.

Also, several neighborhood names extend to areas well beyond their technical borders. For example, Downtown St. Louis is generally thought to include the St. Louis Union Station and Enterprise Center, even though Downtown technically ends at Tucker Avenue (12th Street). Additionally, the Fox Theatre and Powell Symphony Hall are popularly considered a part of Midtown St. Louis even though they are in Grand Center. Dogtown is an area south of Forest Park that includes at least four distinct neighborhoods.

Moreover, sometimes several neighborhoods are lumped together in categories such as "North City" and "South City." North City used to have large Polish and German, among others, immigrant populations, evidenced by the churches they built, such as St. Stanislaus Kostka Church.

The following is a list of neighborhoods of the city of St. Louis, Missouri.

Neighborhood	Population	White	Black	Hispanic/Latino^{2}	AIAN^{1}	Asian	Mixed race	Corridor
Academy/Sherman Park	2,355	5.0	87.3	2.3	0.3	1.1	5.3	North
Baden	5,465	3.9	91.8	0.8	0.4	0.1	3.4	North
Benton Park	3,581	68.1	22.3	3.8	0.4	1.3	6.8	South
Benton Park West	4,328	31.7	50.0	13.2	0.6	1.9	8.2	South
Bevo Mill	11,941	58.3	20.6	11.6	0.6	4.8	9.9	South
Botanical Heights	1,196	37.2	50.0	5.0	0.3	3.3	7.3	Central
Boulevard Heights	8,690	74.0	6.4	5.5	0.3	9.1	7.9	South
Carondelet	7,734	43.1	39.3	9.6	0.5	1.5	9.9	South
Carr Square	2,236	2.1	94.9	0.9	0	0.3	2.0	North
Central West End	16,670	56.9	21.0	4.7	0.1	13.7	6.4	Central
Cheltenham	1260	65.2	8.4	5.4	0.2	17.9	7.1	Central
Clayton-Tamm	2,348	85.2	4.6	4.8	0.2	2.2	6.8	Central
Clifton Heights	2,836	86.2	3.9	3.3	0.1	2.3	5.8	South
College Hill	1,243	4.3	92.2	0.6	0.5	1.7	1.6	North
Columbus Square	1,978	5.8	88.7	2.2	0.2	0.6	3.3	North
Compton Heights	1,396	72.6	16.5	3.5	0.2	3.6	6.3	South
DeBaliviere Place	3,651	55.0	25.0	5.0	0.2	10.9	6.9	Central
Downtown	5,442	43.3	44.2	4.9	0.3	4.4	5.6	Central
Downtown West	5,115	46.2	41.0	4.8	0.4	4.0	6.0	Central
Dutchtown	15,356	26.0	50.7	12.1	0.5	7.0	8.3	South
Ellendale	1,385	76.3	10.6	4.3	0.2	1.7	8.4	South
Fairground	1,157	2.8	93.7	0.9	0.4	0	2.2	North
Forest Park Southeast	3,458	46.2	36.1	4.7	0.2	7.0	7.3	Central
Fountain Park	1,075	3.6	89.2	1.7	1.1	0	4.2	North
Fox Park	2,545	41.4	48.9	4.8	0.1	1.3	5.4	South
Franz Park	2,260	80.4	6.0	5.0	0.2	2.9	7.7	Central
The Gate District	3,419	19.2	72.5	3.0	0.1	1.9	5.1	Central
Grand Center	3,041	31.1	53.1	5.2	0.1	8.7	4.4	Central
Gravois Park	4,684	20.6	60.7	10.9	0.5	2.7	8.0	South
Greater Ville	4,545	1.3	95.2	1.1	0.2	0	2.5	North
Hamilton Heights	2,187	2.7	92.8	1.4	0.1	0.1	3.3	North
The Hill	2,487	90.4	2.5	3.3	0.2	1.1	4.5	South
Hi-Pointe	2,151	80.2	6.3	3.5	0.2	5.3	6.6	Central
Holly Hills	3,647	67.5	16.8	8.0	0.5	3.2	8.6	South
Hyde Park	2,271	9.7	84.6	1.6	0.4	0.3	3.8	North
JeffVanderLou	4,209	2.9	92.3	1.5	0.5	0.2	3.6	North
Kings Oak	167	61.1	31.1	1.2	0	0.6	6.0	Central
Kingsway East	2,502	1.8	92.9	1.1	0.3	0.2	4.0	North
Kingsway West	2,604	7.0	89.6	0.6	0.1	0	2.6	North
Kosciusko	52	38.5	30.8	15.4	0	0	26.9	South
Lafayette Square	2,164	77.7	11.4	3.3	0	2.4	7.3	Central
LaSalle Park	1,088	30.7	62.7	1.6	0.1	0.4	5.4	Central
Lewis Place	1,359	11.8	84.5	1.8	0.4	0.2	2.1	North
Lindenwood Park	9,387	83.1	6.3	4.4	0.1	2.5	6.6	South
Marine Villa	2,530	35.3	48.0	10.1	0.7	1.1	9.1	South
Mark Twain	3,257	2.4	95.1	1.0	0.2	0.3	1.4	North
Mark Twain/I-70 Industrial	902	3.7	92.5	1.3	0.1	0.2	3.0	North
McKinley Heights	1,668	52.3	37.8	3.2	0.1	1.5	7.8	South
Midtown	6,862	47.7	34.7	3.9	0.2	9.7	4.1	Central
Mount Pleasant	4,376	36.3	46.7	10.6	0.6	2.1	7.8	South
Near North Riverfront	395	42.5	50.6	3.8	0.3	2.8	2.1	North
North Hampton	7,489	71.4	15.9	4.6	0.3	4.2	6.8	South
North Point	3,396	1.6	95.3	0.8	0.1	0	2.5	North
North Riverfront	154	57.8	32.5	9.7	1.3	0.6	0	North
O’Fallon	4,342	1.3	95.2	0.8	0.3	0.5	2.5	North
Old North St. Louis	1,488	12.8	82.5	1.1	0.1	0.1	4.3	North
Patch	2,842	55.2	29.7	8.1	1.0	1.3	8.8	South
Peabody Darst Webbe	2,443	15.3	79.7	1.6	0.1	0.8	3.6	Central
Penrose	5,243	0.9	95.3	0.8	0.5	0	2.8	North
Princeton Heights	7,346	81.4	7.4	5.0	0.2	1.9	7.4	South
Riverview	242	28.1	69.8	0.4	0	0	1.7	North
Shaw	6,919	66.2	21.9	4.4	0.2	2.8	7.7	South
Skinker-DeBaliviere	3,899	48.6	29.4	4.2	0.4	13.2	6.7	Central
Soulard	3,831	75.2	15.8	4.3	0.2	1.1	6.0	South
Southampton	6,647	82.0	8.6	4.4	0.4	1.7	5.9	South
Southwest Garden	5,245	73.8	13.1	4.5	0.2	4.7	6.5	South
St. Louis Hills	7,516	88.8	3.7	2.6	0.2	1.5	5.0	South
St. Louis Place	2,336	6.3	89.8	1.4	0.5	0.2	2.9	North
Tiffany	915	25.7	62.6	3.5	0.2	4.7	4.5	Central
Tower Grove East	5,708	55.6	28.9	5.3	0.1	5.3	8.2	South
Tower Grove South	12,719	57.6	21.8	8.4	0.4	7.7	7.6	South
Vandeventer	2,041	4.8	88.9	1.9	0.4	0.5	3.9	North
The Ville	1,427	1.7	95.9	0.3	0.3	0	1.8	North
Visitation Park	924	18.1	77.6	1.5	0.2	1.2	2.3	North
Walnut Park East	2,757	1.4	93.9	1.6	0.1	0	3.4	North
Walnut Park West	2,561	0.8	95.1	0.8	0.2	0.1	3.4	North
Wells/Goodfellow	4,473	1.5	94.7	1.0	0.1	0.1	2.9	North
West End	6,846	10.5	71.5	7.7	0.4	6.8	5.4	North
Wydown/Skinker	1,121	73.4	2.9	3.7	0.2	18.5	4.6	Central

All Data from 2020 U.S. Census Bureau

^1 American Indian or Alaskan Native ^2 May be of any race.

The north side of the city is defined as north of Delmar Boulevard, the central corridor as between Delmar and I-44, and the south side as south of I-44.

In 2020 the north side was 90.0% Black, 4.5% White, 0.3% American Indian/Alaska Native, 0.8% Asian, 3.2% two or more races and 1.2% some other race. 1.8% of the population was of Hispanic or Latino origin.

In 2020 the central corridor was 32.6% Black, 50.9% White, 0.2% American Indian/Alaska Native, 5.9% two or more races, 8.3% Asian, and 2.0% some other race. 4.3% of the population was of Hispanic or Latino origin.

In 2020 the south side was 24.0% black, 60.6% white, 0.4% American Indian/Alaska Native, 7.6% two or more races, 3.9% Asian, and 3.6% some other race. 7.1% of the population was of Hispanic or Latino origin.

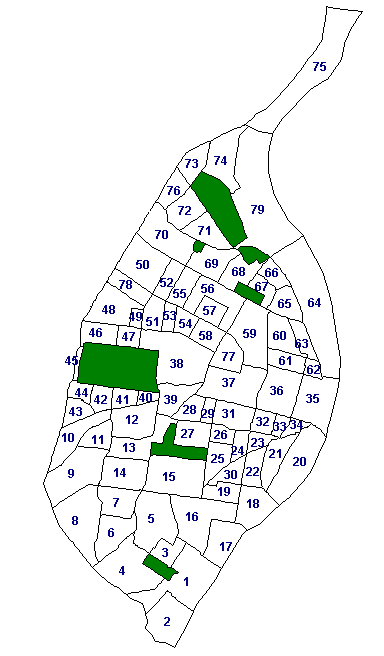
Map of the 79 neighborhoods of St. Louis, Missouri

== Aldermanic wards ==
The city can also be divided by the wards of the Board of Aldermen. These wards, however, change with every new census, and data are not as readily available for comparison across wards. Nevertheless, the wards are important in the functioning of the city, as the approval of the local alderman is generally understood to be necessary before large projects may begin.

== See also ==
- Mill Creek Valley, former historic neighborhood
