= Academy, St. Louis =

Neighborhood of St. Louis in Missouri, US

Coordinates: 38.6584°N 90.2673°W

Academy
- Neighborhood of St. Louis
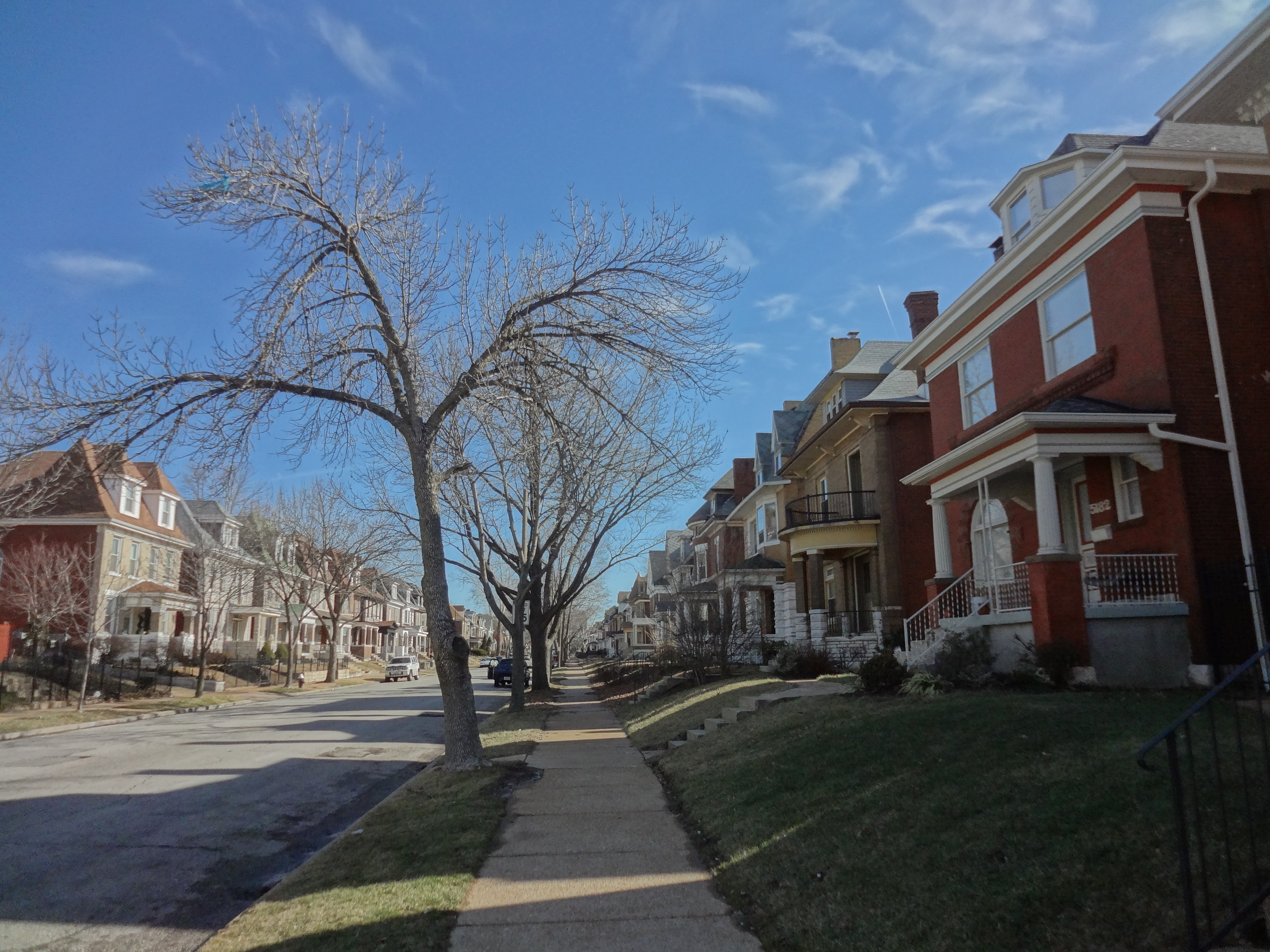
- Houses on Cabanne Avenue in Academy, January 2012

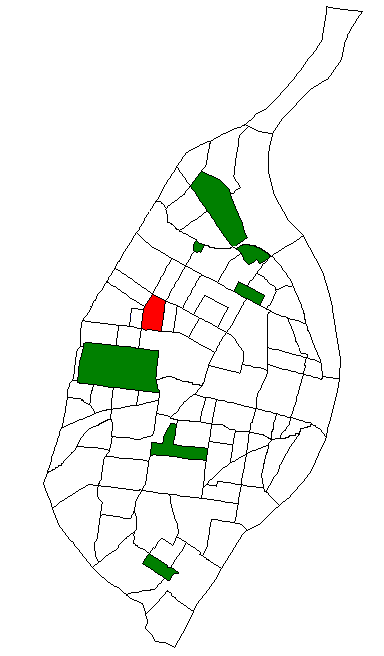
- Location (red) of Academy within St. Louis
- Country: United States
- State: Missouri
- City: St. Louis
- Ward: 10

Government
  - Alderperson: Shameem Clark Hubbard

Area
  - Total: 0.44 sq mi (1.1 km^{2})

Population (2020)
  - Total: 2,355
  - Density: 5,400/sq mi (2,100/km^{2})

Demographics 2020
  - White: 5.0%
  - Black: 87.3%
  - Hispanic: 2.3%
  - Asian: 1.1%
  - Other: 5.6%
- ZIP code(s): Parts of 63108, 63113
- Area code(s): 314
- Website: Academy Neighborhood

Academy/Sherman Park is a neighborhood in North St. Louis, just outside Central West End. The official boundaries of the area are Dr. Martin Luther King Drive on the north, Delmar Boulevard on the south, North Kingshighway Boulevard on the east, and Union Boulevard on the west.

As of 2020, there were 2,355 people residing in this neighborhood, which contained 1,276 housing units. The racial makeup of the neighborhood was 4.97% White, 87.26% Black, 1.10% Asian, 1.15% from some other race, and 5.27% from two or more races. Hispanic or Latino of any race were 2.29% of the population.

Sally Benson grew up in the Academy neighborhood. She described her childhood in her novels that inspired the film Meet Me in St. Louis. The Benson house at 5135 Kensington Avenue no longer exists. After being sold, it fell into disrepair, eventually became uninhabitable, and was demolished in 1994.

Tennessee Williams attended Soldan High School in the neighborhood and used it as a setting for his play The Glass Menagerie.

Historical population
| Census | Pop. | Note | %± |
|---|---|---|---|
| 1990 | 5,169 | | — |
| 2000 | 3,797 | | −26.5% |
| 2010 | 2,816 | | −25.8% |
| 2020 | 2,355 | | −16.4% |
