= Columbus Square, St. Louis =

Neighborhood of St. Louis in Missouri, US

Coordinates: 38.6378°N 90.1906°W

Columbus Square
- Neighborhood of St. Louis
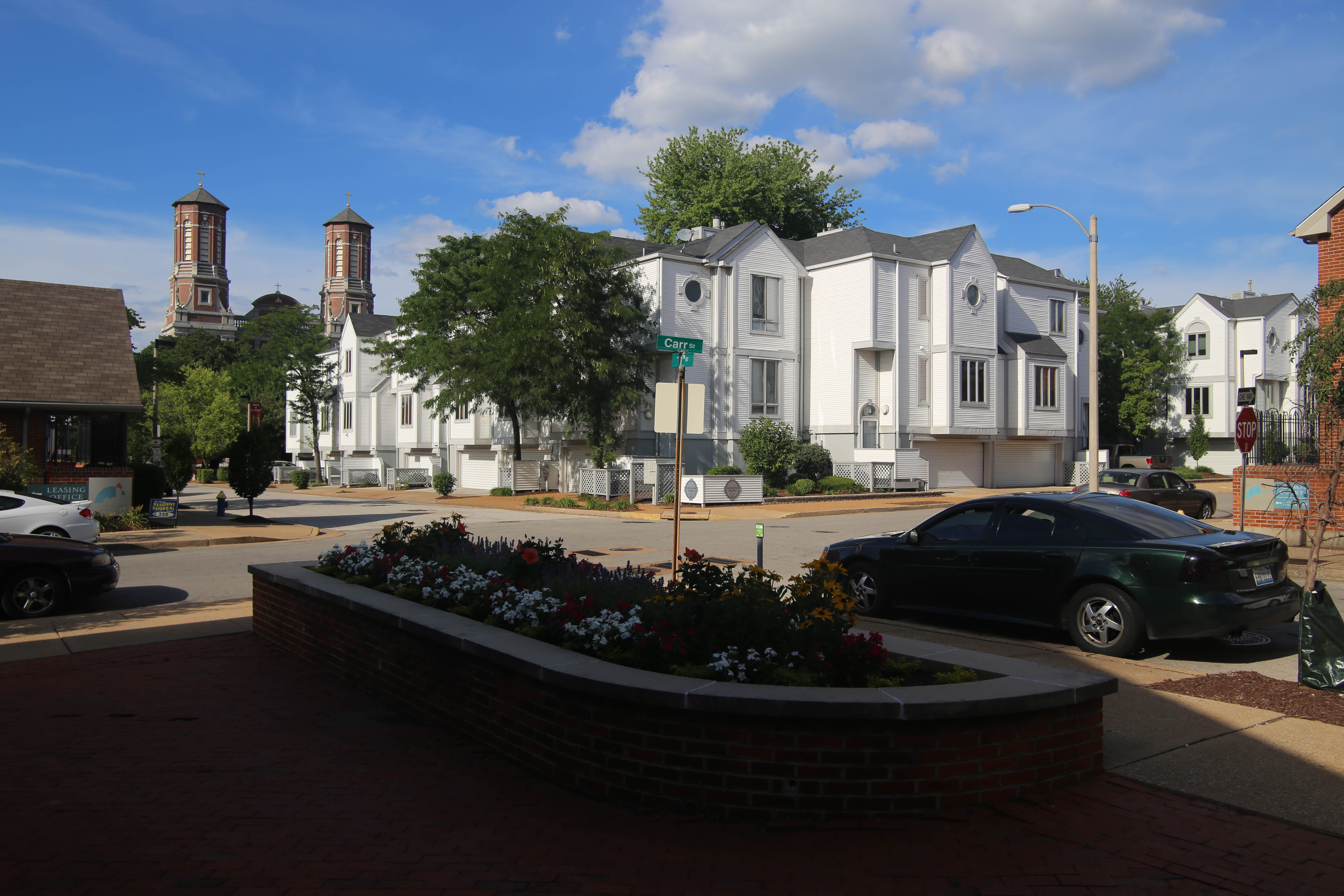
- Columbus Square houses, July 2016

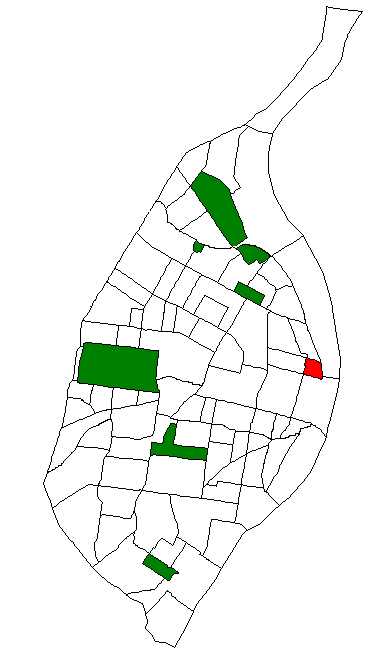
- Location (red) of Columbus Square within St. Louis
- Country: United States
- State: Missouri
- City: St. Louis
- Ward: 14

Government
  - Alderperson: Rasheen Aldridge

Area
  - Total: 0.19 sq mi (0.49 km^{2})

Population (2020)
  - Total: 1,978
  - Density: 10,000/sq mi (4,000/km^{2})
- ZIP code(s): Part of 63101, 63102, 63106
- Area code(s): 314
- Website: stlouis-mo.gov

Columbus Square is a neighborhood of St. Louis, Missouri. It is bounded by Cass Avenue to the north, I-70 to the east, Tucker & North 13th Streets to the west, and Cole Street to the south.

Columbus Square was settled by successive waves of immigrants. The first wave, a group of German Catholics, settled in the vicinity of 11th and Biddle Streets. Later, the first Irish immigrants colonized the land around 6th and Biddle, an area that subsequently became St. Patrick's parish. After 1840, the area from the river west to 12th Street was built up with high-density tenement quarters, row houses of two and three stories high, for the newly arriving immigrant laborers. Many of these structures fell before the wave of commercial and industrial development that began after the Civil War. Regardless, of those that remained, most had deteriorated into decrepit, overcrowded slums as early as 1870.

These tenement communities tightly built around roads and alleyways became known for their poor living conditions and crime, with nicknames such as "Castle Thunder," "Clabber Alley," and "Wild Cat Chute." An Italian community began to emerge near 7th and Carr Streets after the turn of the century. By 1920 the whole area north and west of downtown assumed a polyglot character of mixed nationalities, including immigrants from Russia and the Balkan countries. During the same period, in the portion that we now call Columbus Square, truck terminals and industries replaced many of these tenement homes. Housing staged a comeback in the area with the erection of the Neighborhood Gardens apartments in 1936 and Cochran Gardens public housing in 1952. Later projects included the Columbus Square Townhomes and the Castles. Both projects were constructed between 1985 and 1987.

== Demographics ==
In 2020 Columbus Square's racial makeup was 88.7% Black, 5.8% White, 0.2% Native American, 0.6% Asian, 3.3% Two or More Races, and 1.5% Some Other Race. 2.2% of the population was of Hispanic or Latino origin.

In 2010, among the 79 St. Louis neighborhoods, Columbus Square ranked last for median household income ($18,800) and percentage of households with six-figure incomes (0%), and 72nd for percentage of working age men who are employed (47.3%). It has the highest percentage of households receiving food stamps (69.6%), the second-highest percentage of the population without a high school diploma (31.1%) and the second-lowest percentage of the population with a college degree (4.4%).

Historical population
Census	Pop.	Note	%±
1990	2,047		—
2000	1,949		−4.8%
2010	1,869		−4.1%
2020	1,978		5.8%
