= Kingsway West, St. Louis =

Neighborhood of St. Louis in Missouri, US

Coordinates: 38.6713°N 90.2602°W

Kingsway West
- Neighborhood of St. Louis
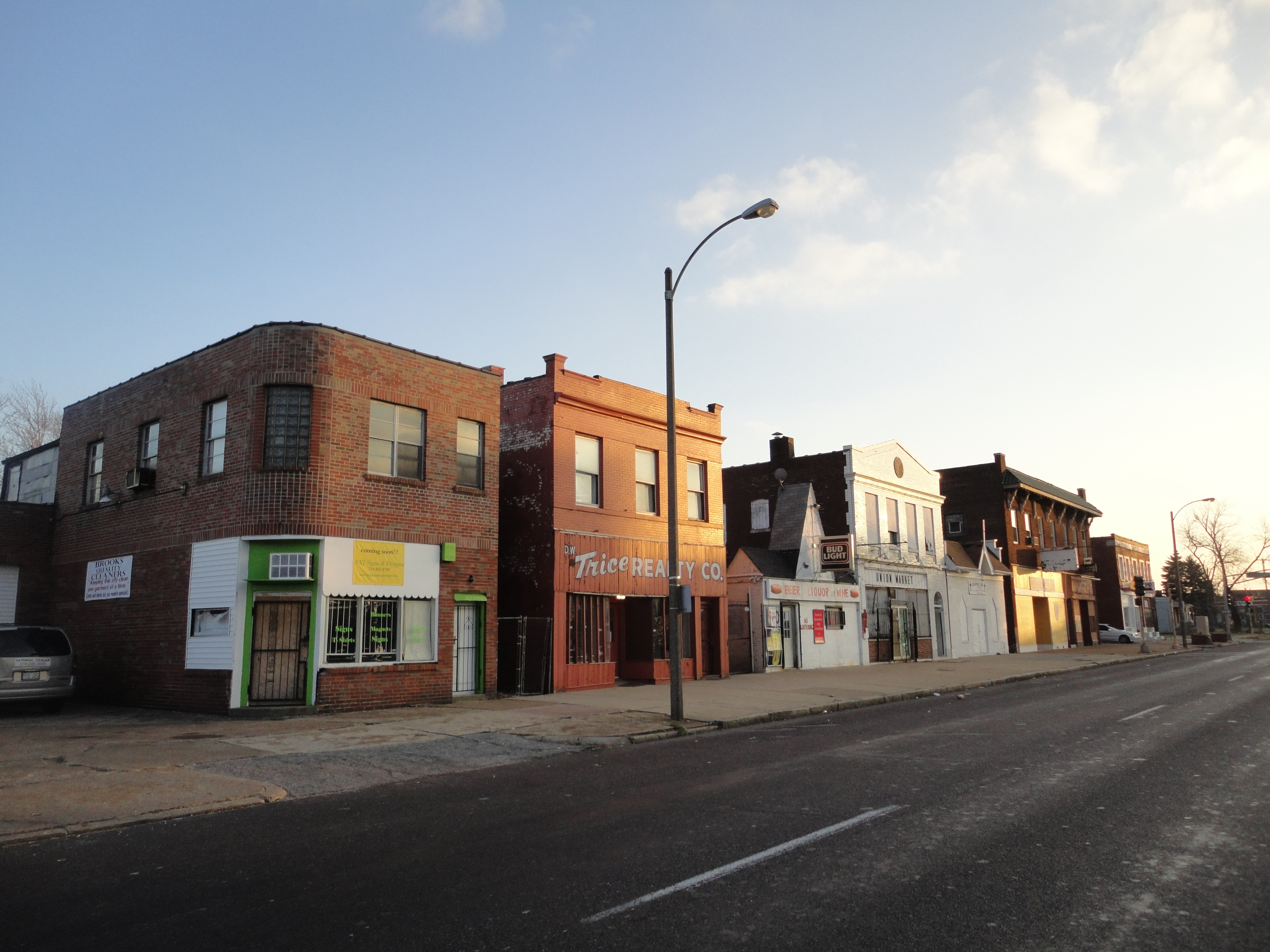
- Buildings on Union Boulevard in Kingsway West, December 2010

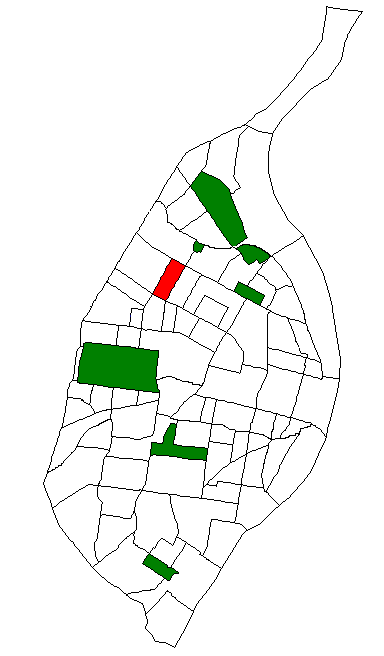
- Location (red) of Kingsway West within St. Louis
- Country: United States
- State: Missouri
- City: St. Louis
- Wards: 12

Government
  - Aldermen: Sharon Tyus

Area
  - Total: 0.42 sq mi (1.1 km^{2})

Population (2020)
  - Total: 2,604
  - Density: 6,200/sq mi (2,400/km^{2})
- ZIP code(s): Parts of 63113, 63115
- Area code(s): 314
- Website: stlouis-mo.gov

Kingsway West is a neighborhood of St. Louis, Missouri. The Kingsway West neighborhood is defined by Union Boulevard to its north-west and Dr. Martin Luther King Drive to its south-west. Natural Bridge Avenue forms its north-east boundary and North Kingshighway is its southeast boundary.

== Characteristics ==
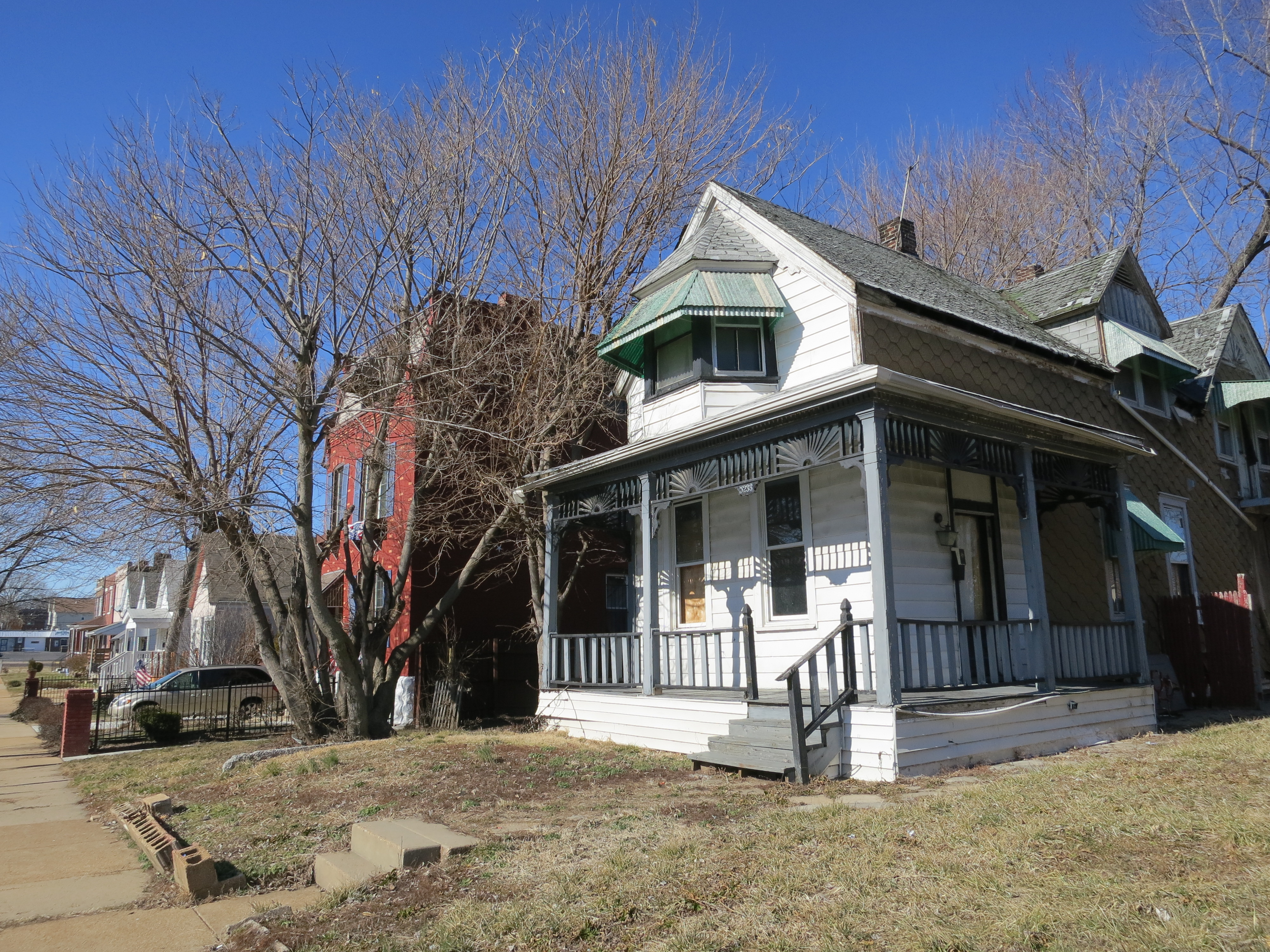
Houses on Theodosia Ave, February 2013

Kings Heights is a newer development of condominiums and attached townhomes in a private setting. The area is experiencing new residential construction on Norwood Square. There is a stretch of businesses and other commercial uses along Natural Bridge Boulevard which goes through the neighborhood.

== Churches ==
- Cote Brilliante Presbyterian Church 4673 Labadie Avenue, St. Louis, MO 63115.
- Friendly Missionary Baptist Church 5164 Lexington Avenue, St. Louis, MO 63115
- Immanuel Lutheran Church 3540 Marcus (at Lexington), St. Louis, MO 63115.
- Memorial Boulevard Christian Church 3000 North Kingshighway, St. Louis, MO 63114.
- Most Blessed Sacrament Catholic Church 5017 Northland Avenue, St. Louis, MO 63113.

== Demographics ==
Historical population
Census	Pop.	Note	%±
1990	4,182		—
2000	3,886		−7.1%
2010	3,441		−11.5%
2020	2,604		−24.3%

In 2020, Kingshighway West's population was 89.6% Black, 7.0% White, 0.1% Native American, and 2.6% Two or More Races. 0.6% of the population was of Hispanic or Latino origin.
