= Mark Twain/I-70 Industrial, St. Louis =

Neighborhood of St. Louis in Missouri, US

Coordinates: 38.687°N 90.261°W

Mark Twain/I-70 Industrial
- Neighborhood of St. Louis
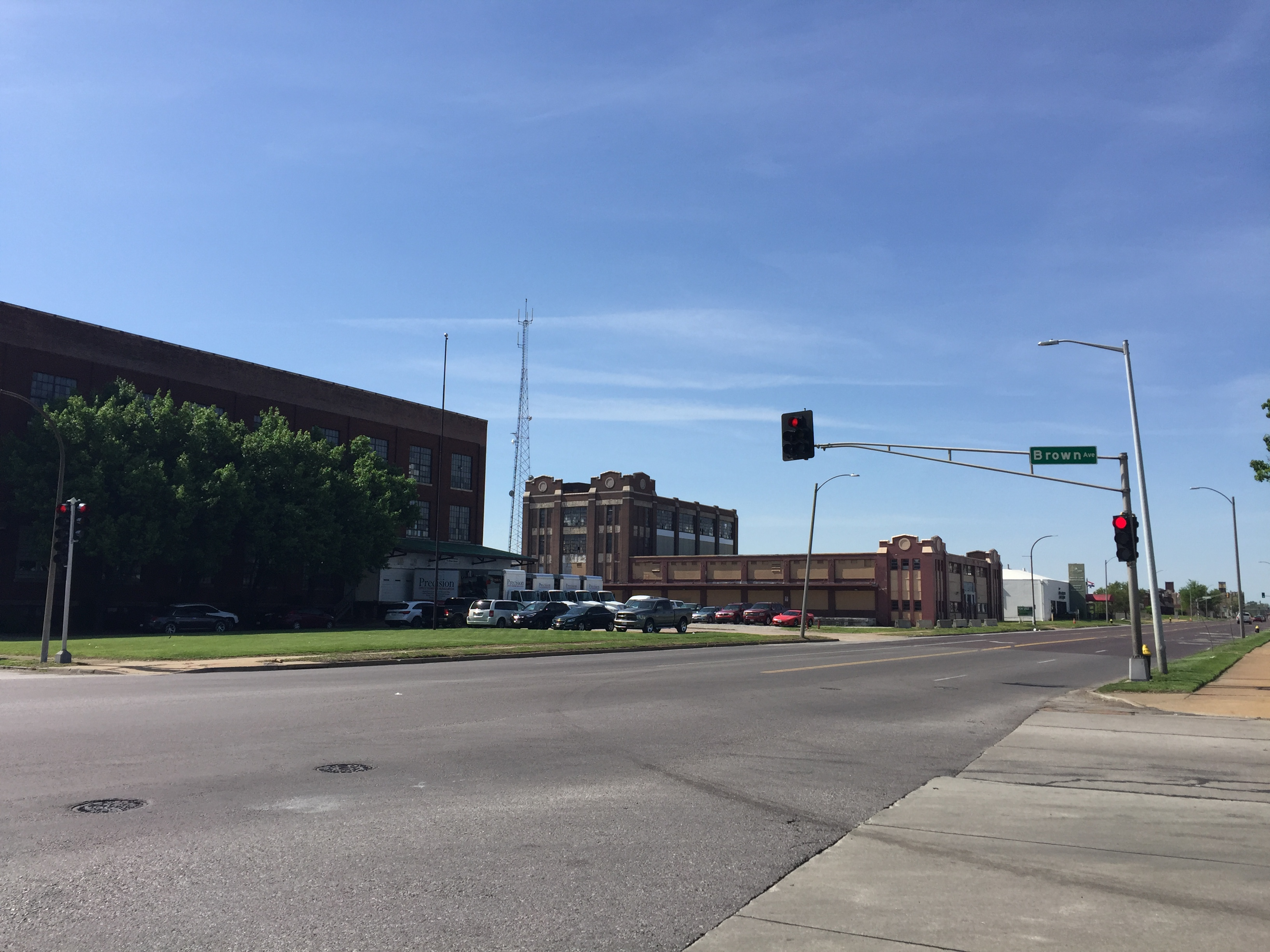
- Mark Twain/I-70 Industrial in May 2018. View from Union Boulevard and Brown intersection facing south.

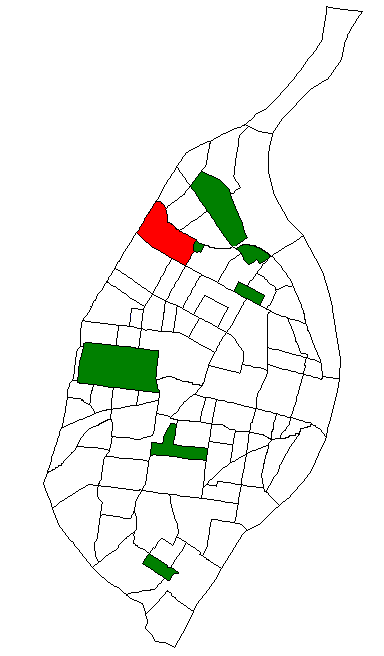
- Location (red) of Mark Twain I-70 Industrial within St. Louis
- Country: United States
- State: Missouri
- City: St. Louis
- Wards: 12, 13

Government
  - Aldermen: Sharon Tyus, Pam Boyd

Area
  - Total: 1.21 sq mi (3.1 km^{2})

Population (2020)
  - Total: 902
  - Density: 745/sq mi (288/km^{2})
- ZIP code(s): Part of 63115, 63120
- Area code(s): 314
- Website: stlouis-mo.gov

Mark Twain/I-70 Industrial is a neighborhood of St. Louis, Missouri. It is bound by I-70 to the north, North Kingshighway to the east, Natural Bridge Road to the south, and the city limit to the west.

== Demographics ==
Historical population
Census	Pop.	Note	%±
1990	1,581		—
2000	1,361		−13.9%
2010	1,295		−4.8%
2020	902		−30.3%

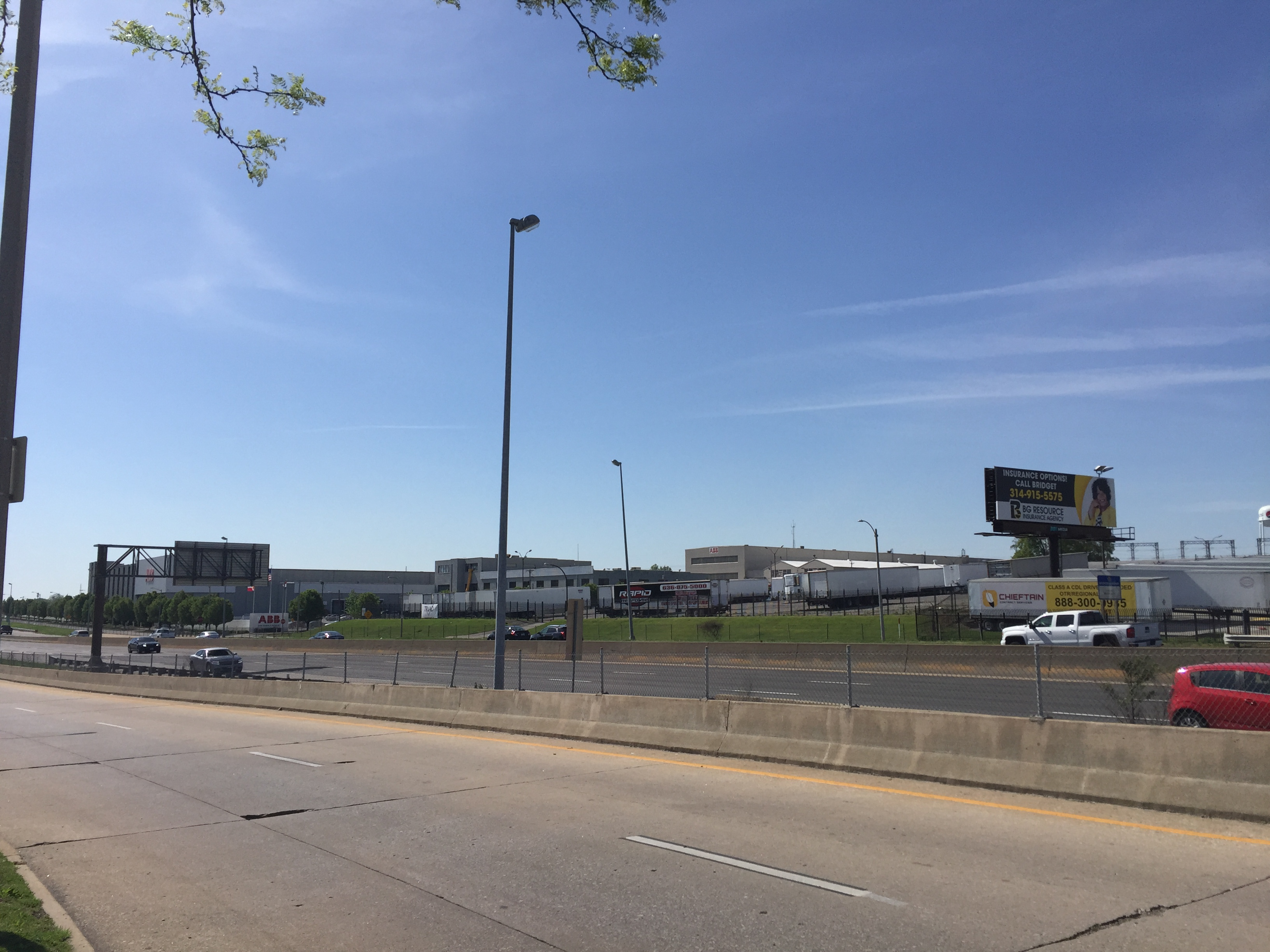
View of Mark Twain/I-70 Industrial as seen from Bircher Boulevard. I-70 is visible as well.

In 2020 Mark Twain/I-70 Industrial's racial makeup was 92.5% Black, 3.7% White, 0.2% Asian, 0.1% American Indian, 3.0% Two or More Races, and 0.6% Some Other Race. 1.3% of the population was of Hispanic or Latino origin.
