= West End, St. Louis =

Neighborhood of St. Louis in Missouri, US

Coordinates: 38.661°N 90.286°W

West End
- Neighborhood of St. Louis
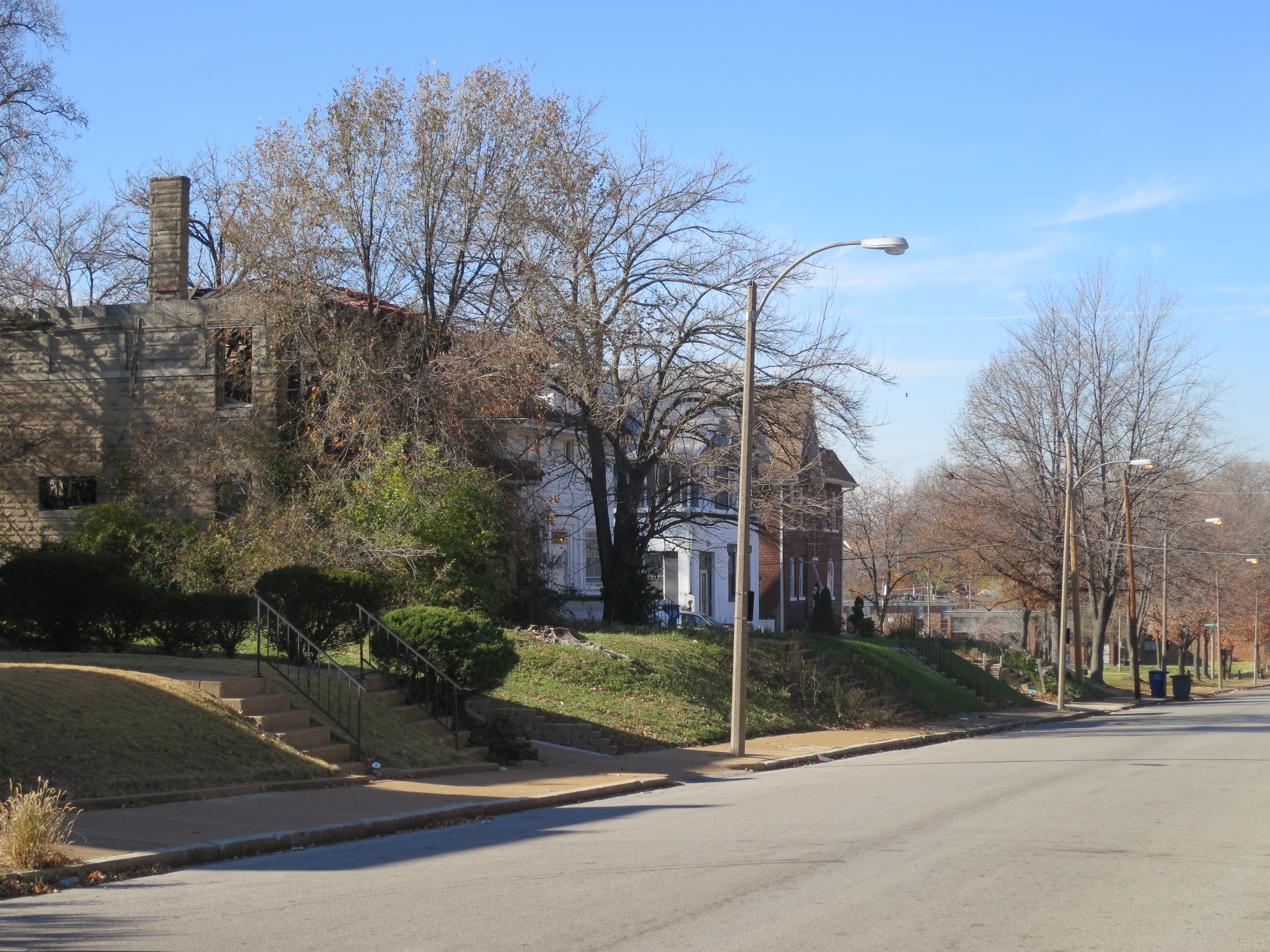
- Concrete Block Historic District, West End, November 2012

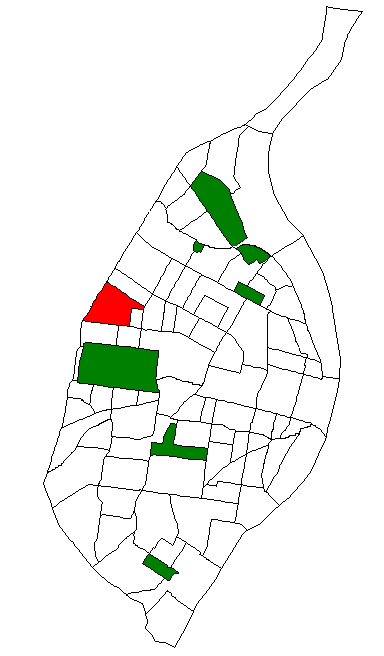
- Location (red) of West End within St. Louis
- Country: United States
- State: Missouri
- City: St. Louis
- Ward: 10

Government
  - Alderperson: Shameem Clark Hubbard

Area
  - Total: 1.02 sq mi (2.6 km^{2})

Population (2020)
  - Total: 6,846
  - Density: 6,710/sq mi (2,590/km^{2})
- ZIP code(s): Parts of 63112, 63130
- Area code(s): 314
- Website: stlouis-mo.gov

West End is a neighborhood of St. Louis, Missouri. This neighborhood is defined by Page Boulevard on the North, Delmar Boulevard on the South, Belt Avenue and Union Boulevard via Maple Avenue on the East, and City limits on the West. The neighborhood is home to the Emmanuel DeHodiamont House, one of the two oldest houses in St. Louis.

== History ==
Land for the neighborhood was held by the family of Jean Pierre Cabanné. Between 1890 and 1920, lands were subdivided and most of its existing housing stock was built.

From the 1950s through the 1970s, the West End saw significant racial transition. In 1950, neighborhood residents were 98.2% white. By 1960, the neighborhood was 30% white. Across the local area, 57,450 white families moved out and 56,150 black families moved in. Much of this transition occurred in the final three years before 1960. Investors encouraged white flight by blockbusting the neighborhood, and housing stock became more crowded. In the 1960s, middle-class black families left the neighborhood as the housing stock deteriorated. Landlords found that local rents did not cover operating costs, causing widespread "milking" and disinvestment.

== Demographics ==
Historical population
Census	Pop.	Note	%±
1990	8,796		—
2000	6,438		−26.8%
2010	6,574		2.1%
2020	6,846		4.1%

In 2020, West End's population was 71.5% Black, 10.5% White, 0.4% Native American, 6.8% Asian, 5.4% Two or More Races, and 5.4% Some Other Race. 7.7% of the population was of Hispanic or Latino Origin.
