= Hamilton Heights, St. Louis =

Neighborhood of St. Louis in Missouri, US

Coordinates: 38.6678°N 90.2783°W

Hamilton Heights
- Neighborhood of St. Louis
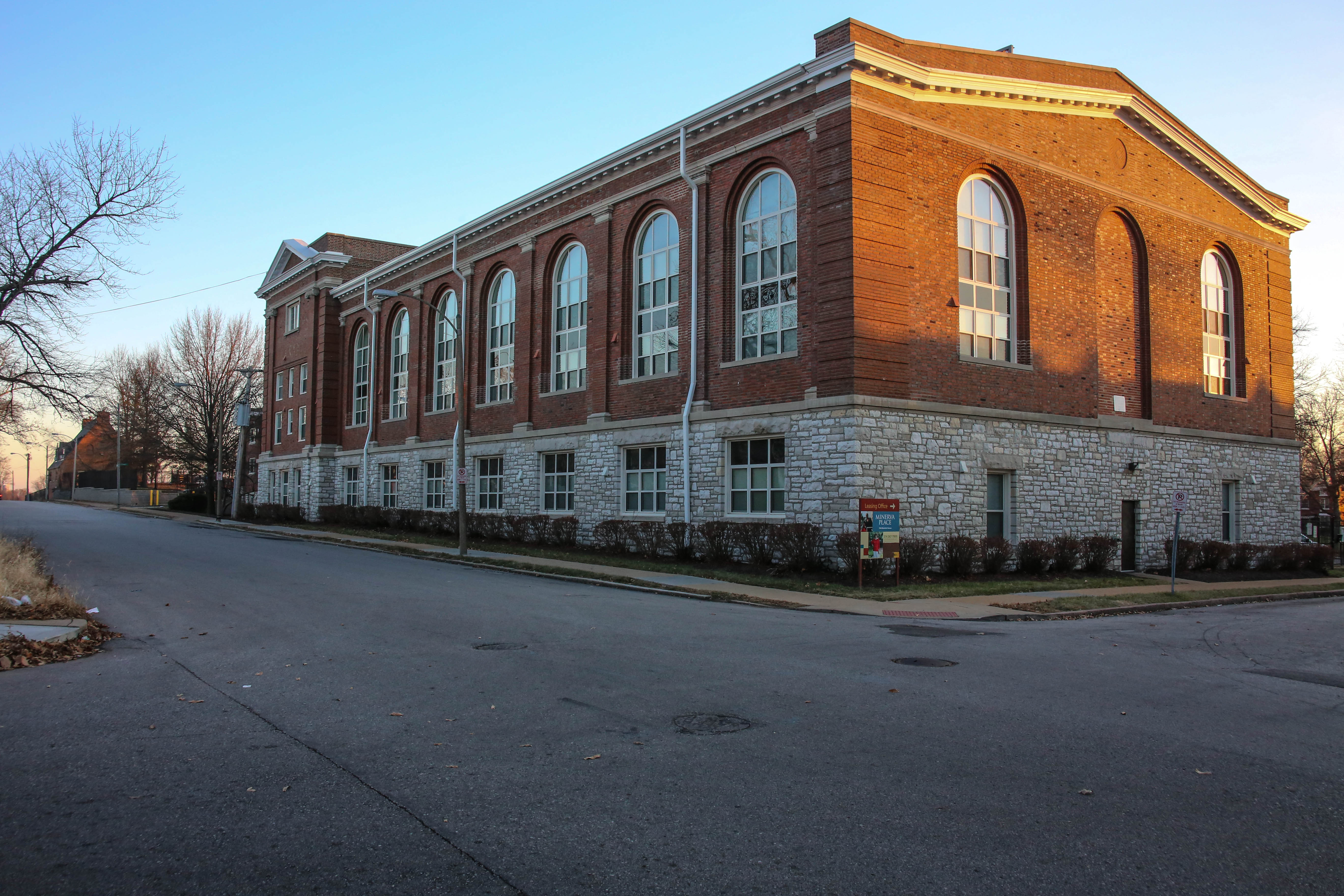
- Principia Page-Park YMCA Gymnasium, a National Register of Historic Places site in Hamilton Heights, December 2014

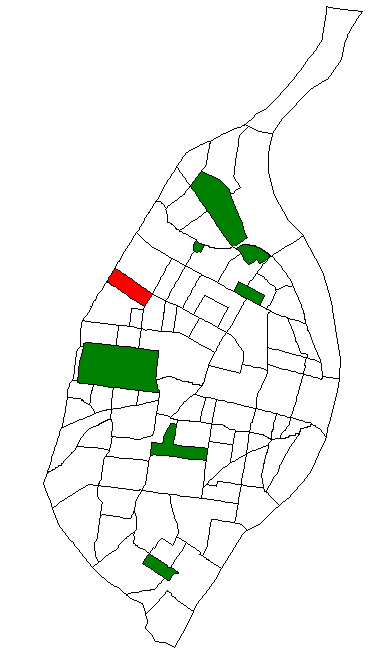
- Location (red) of Hamilton Heights within St. Louis
- Country: United States
- State: Missouri
- City: St. Louis
- Wards: 13

Government
  - Aldermen: Pam Boyd

Area
  - Total: 0.48 sq mi (1.2 km^{2})

Population (2020)
  - Total: 2,187
  - Density: 4,600/sq mi (1,800/km^{2})
- ZIP code(s): Part of 63112
- Area code(s): 314
- Website: stlouis-mo.gov

Hamilton Heights is a neighborhood of St. Louis, Missouri. The neighborhood is bounded by Dr. Martin Luther King Drive (co-signed with Missouri Route 180) on the Northeast, the city limits (border with Wellston, Missouri) on the Northwest, Page Avenue on the South, and Union Boulevard on the East.

== Institutions ==
This neighborhood is noteworthy for its numerous religious institutions. Ford Elementary Community Education Center, Emerson elementary, and Hempstead Elementary offer easily accessible basic education to area children. Ford Elementary Community School provides good quality education to children and a wide range of community programs for neighborhood residents of all ages. Parenting programs, vocational classes and family enrichment classes are some of the classes available through the community school system. Union West Community Corporation, the local neighborhood association, assists neighborhood residents in improving their quality of living. The Martin Luther King Community Center has been an addition to the community since 1996.

== Characteristics ==
Although two-to four-family units are prevalent, a large number of larger single family homes are also present. The vast majority of the housing stock consists of brick architecture built between the years 1890 and 1920. The area offers good opportunities for housing and land redevelopment.

== Demographics ==
Historical population
Census	Pop.	Note	%±
1990	5,505		—
2000	3,833		−30.4%
2010	3,105		−19.0%
2020	2,187		−29.6%

In 2020 Hamilton Heights' racial makeup consisted of 92.8% African-American, 2.7% White, 0.1% Native American, 0.1% Asian, 3.3% two or more races, and 0.9% some other race. 1.4% of the population was of Hispanic or Latino origin.
