= Walnut Park West, St. Louis =

Neighborhood of St. Louis in Missouri, US

Coordinates: 38.7057°N 90.2567°W

Walnut Park West
- Neighborhood of St. Louis
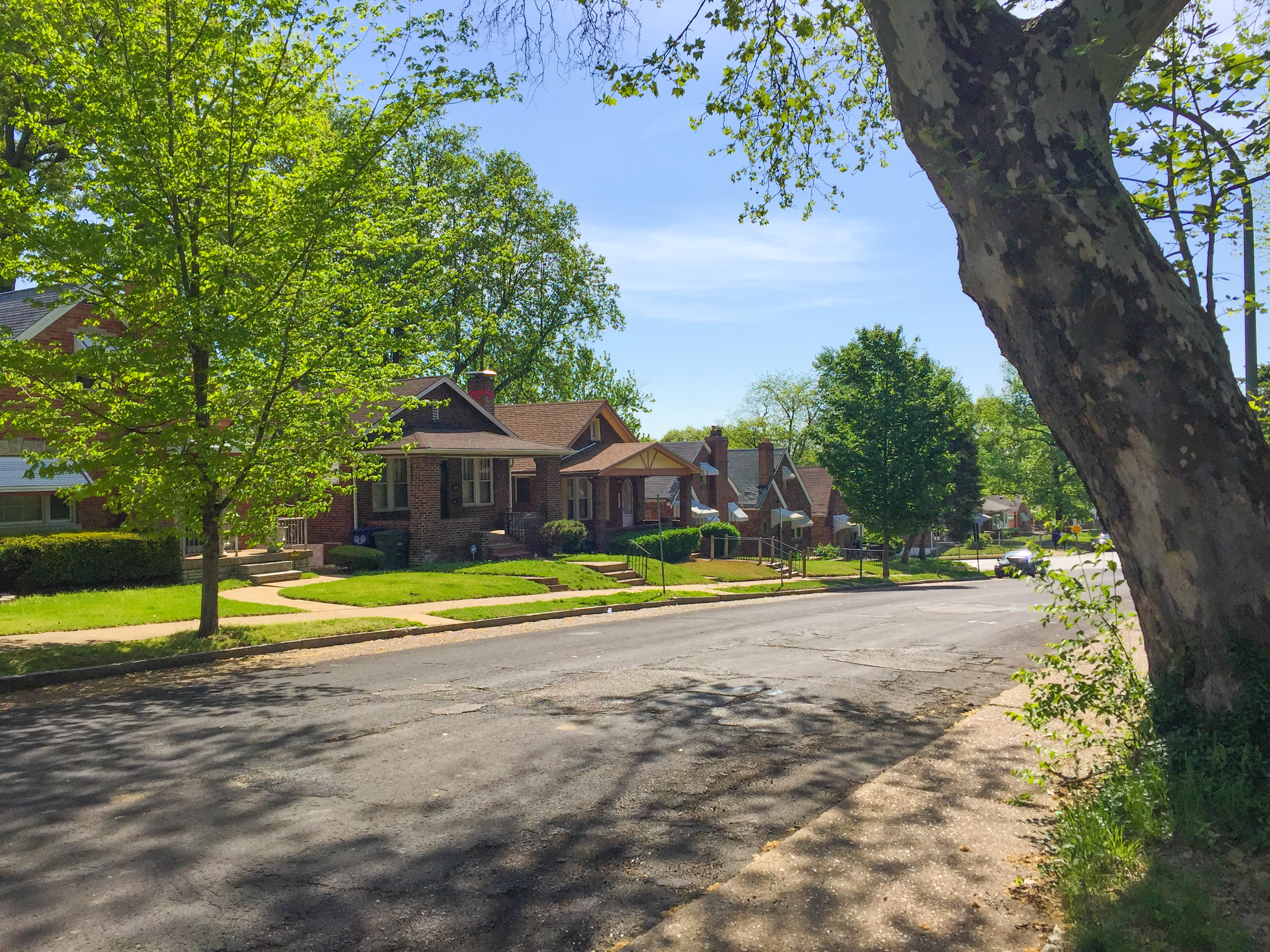
- Walnut Park West houses near Goodfellow and Emma, May 2018

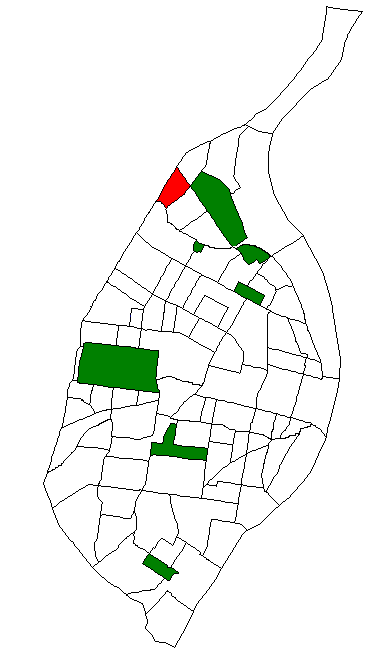
- Location (red) of Walnut Park West within St. Louis
- Country: United States
- State: Missouri
- City: St. Louis
- Wards: 13

Government
  - Aldermen: Pam Boyd

Area
  - Total: 0.43 sq mi (1.1 km^{2})

Population (2020)
  - Total: 2,561
  - Density: 6,000/sq mi (2,300/km^{2})
- ZIP code(s): Part of 63136
- Area code(s): 314
- Website: stlouis-mo.gov

Walnut Park West is a neighborhood of St. Louis, Missouri. The Walnut Park West neighborhood is situated in northwest St. Louis. It is bounded by West Florissant Avenue to the northeast, Riverview Boulevard to the southeast, Interstate Highway 70 (I-70) to the south, and the City limits (St. Louis County and the City of Jennings) to the west and northwest.

== Demographics ==
Historical population
Census	Pop.	Note	%±
1990	4,610		—
2000	4,235		−8.1%
2010	3,349		−20.9%
2020	2,561		−23.5%

In 2010 Walnut Park West's racial makeup was 95.1% Black, 0.8% White, 0.1% Asian, 0.2% American Indian, 3.4% Two or More Races, and 0.4% Some Other Race. 0.8% of the population was of Hispanic or Latino origin.
