= Visitation Park, St. Louis =

Neighborhood of St. Louis in Missouri, US

Coordinates: 38.6568°N 90.2756°W

Visitation Park
- Neighborhood of St. Louis
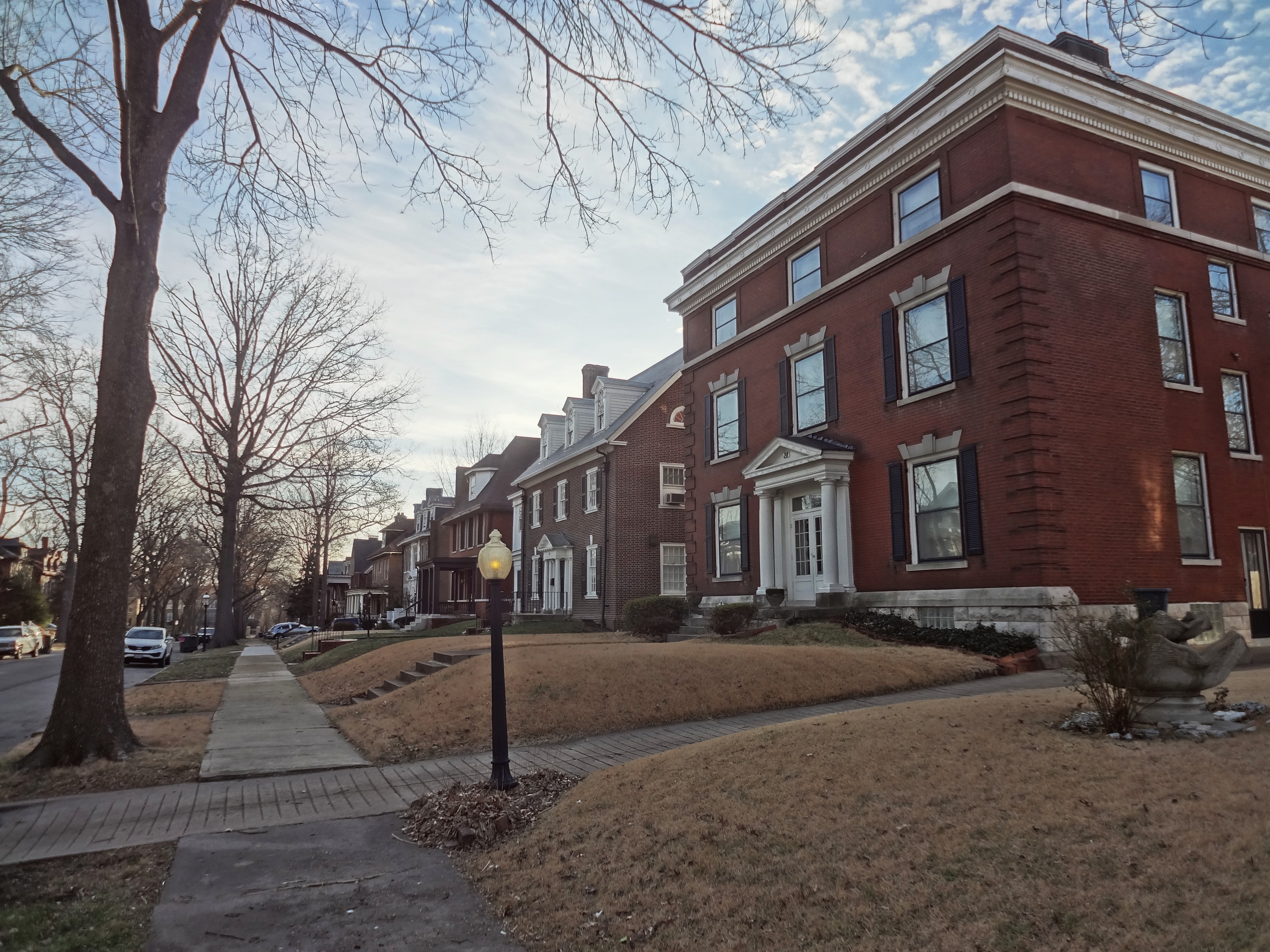
- East on Windermere Place, Visitation Park, January 2012

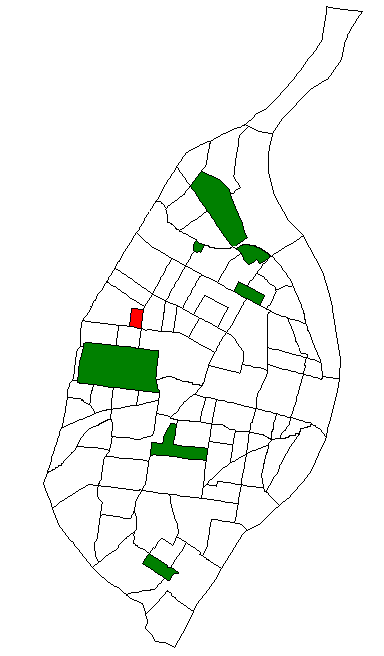
- Location (red) of Visitation Park within St. Louis
- Country: United States
- State: Missouri
- City: St. Louis
- Wards: 10

Government
  - Aldermen: Shameem Clark Hubbard

Area
  - Total: 0.15 sq mi (0.39 km^{2})

Population (2020)
  - Total: 924
  - Density: 6,200/sq mi (2,400/km^{2})
- ZIP code(s): Part of 63112
- Area code(s): 314
- Website: stlouis-mo.gov

Visitation Park is a neighborhood in St. Louis, Missouri. The neighborhood is defined by Maple Avenue on the North, Delmar Boulevard on the South, Union Boulevard on the East, and Belt Avenue on the West. Visitation Park is a small neighborhood nestled southeast of the West End neighborhood, just north of DeBaliviere Place.

The Visitation Park neighborhood is named for the Visitation Academy of St. Louis, which was located at the southeast corner of Cabanne Avenue and Belt Avenue from 1892 to 1962. The Visitation Academy was razed in 1962 and the site became Visitation Park. In 1989, the park was renamed Ivory Perry Park.

== Demographics ==
Historical population
Year	Pop.	±%
1990	1,388	—
2000	1,033	−25.6%
2010	960	−7.1%
2020	924	−3.7%

In 2020 Visitation Park's racial makeup was 77.6% Black, 18.1% White, 0.2% Native American, 1.2% Asian, 2.3% Two or More Races, and 0.7% Some Other Race. 1.5% of the people were of Hispanic or Latino origin.
