= Kings Oak, St. Louis =

Neighborhood of St. Louis in Missouri, US

Coordinates: 38.6271°N 90.2703°W

Kings Oak
- Neighborhood of St. Louis
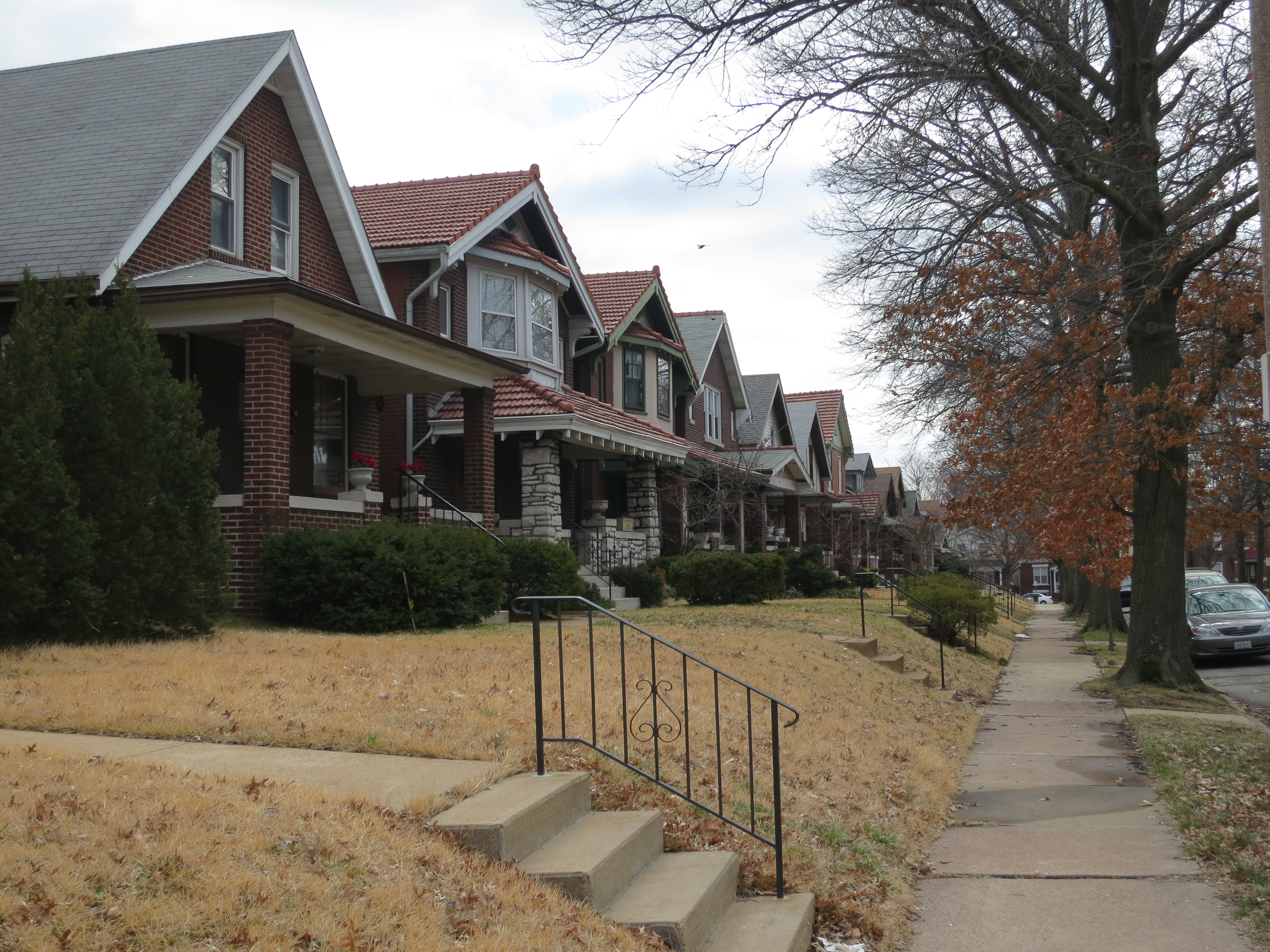
- Houses in Kings Oak, March 2013

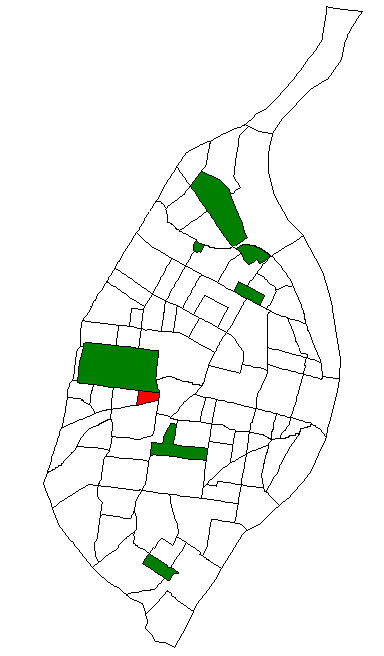
- Location (red) of Kings Oak within St. Louis
- Country: United States
- State: Missouri
- City: St. Louis
- Wards: 9

Government
  - Aldermen: Michael Browning

Area
  - Total: 0.17 sq mi (0.44 km^{2})

Population (2020)
  - Total: 167
  - Density: 980/sq mi (380/km^{2})
- ZIP code(s): Part of 63110
- Area code(s): 314
- Website: stlouis-mo.gov

Kings Oak is a neighborhood of St. Louis, Missouri. The neighborhood is named for two of its streets that make up the neighborhood's boundaries. "Kings" comes from Kingshighway Blvd., the neighborhood's eastern border and "Oak" comes from Oakland Ave., the neighborhood's northern border. The neighborhood has a relatively low population and population density because Saint Louis University High School and the Saint Louis Science Center are located in this very small neighborhood. There are also some industrial businesses along Manchester Ave., the neighborhood's southern border. This leaves little room for houses, most of which are located on the neighborhood's eastern edge.

== Demographics ==
Historical population
Year	Pop.	±%
1990	587	—
2000	243	−58.6%
2010	180	−25.9%
2020	167	−7.2%

In 2020 the population was 61.1% White, 31.7% Black, 0.6% Asian and 6.0% Two or More Races. 1.2% of the population was of Hispanic or Latino origin.

Racial composition	2000	2010	2020
White	43.6%	55.0%	61.1%
Black or African American	50.6%	38.9%	31.1%
Hispanic or Latino (of any race)	3.7%	3.9%	1.2%
Asian	3.7%	2.2%	0.6%
Two or More Races	0.8%	3.9%	6.0%
