= Lewis Place, St. Louis =

Neighborhood of St. Louis in Missouri, US

Coordinates: 38.6542°N 90.2520°W

Lewis Place
- Neighborhood of St. Louis
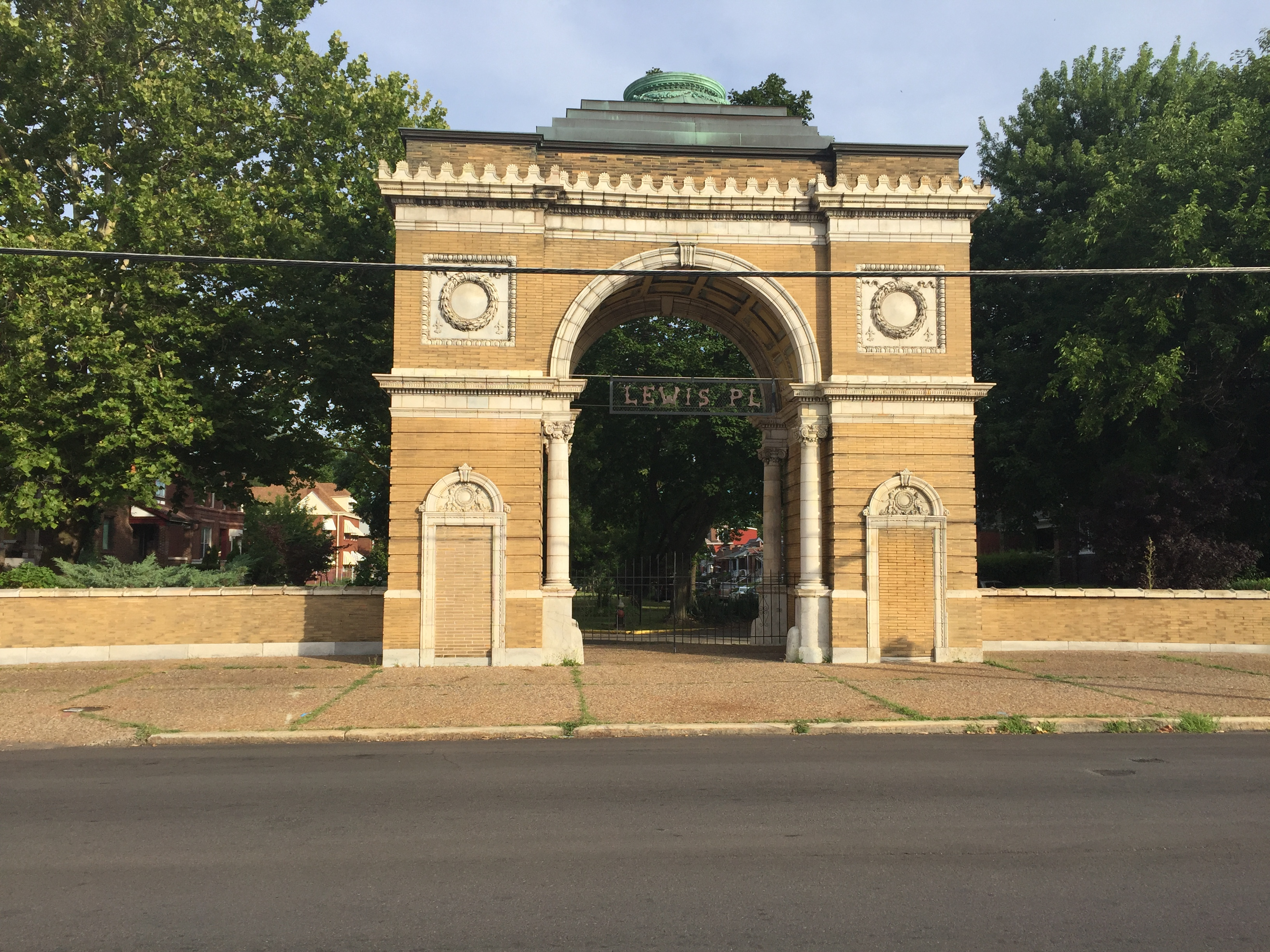

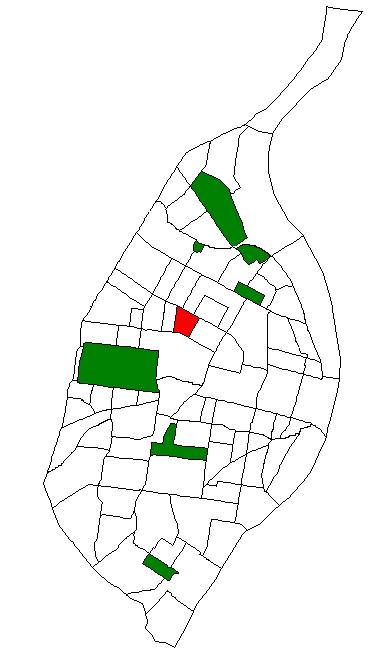
- Location (red) of Lewis Place within St. Louis
- Country: United States
- State: Missouri
- City: St. Louis
- Wards: 10, 12

Government
  - Aldermen: Shameem Clark Hubbard, Sharon Tyus

Area
  - Total: 0.33 sq mi (0.85 km^{2})

Population (2020)
  - Total: 1,359
  - Density: 4,100/sq mi (1,600/km^{2})
- ZIP code(s): Parts of 63108, 63113
- Area code(s): 314
- Website: stlouis-mo.gov

Lewis Place is a neighborhood of St. Louis, Missouri. Lewis Place is defined by Martin Luther King Drive on the North, Delmar Boulevard on the South, Newstead Avenue on the East, and Walton on the West.

== History ==
Lewis Place was laid out in 1890 and was privately owned and developed by the family of William J. Lewis. The Lewis Place historic design recognizes the architectural significance of housing around the turn of the century. The architectural firm of Barnett, Haynes & Barnett has been admired by historic preservationists throughout the country.

Lewis Place is a three-block street with the center parkway which is lined on both sides with homes built between 1890 and 1928. The housing stock reflects the ambiance of housing along the Euclid-Central West End area.

Lewis Place Historic District was placed on the National Register of Historic Places on September 15, 1980. Lewis Place is situated in the midst of a revitalizing community with St. Louis University, Washington University and Ranken Technical College all within a three-mile radius of the Lewis Place community.

== Demographics ==
In 2020 Lewis Place's racial makeup was 84.5% Black, 11.8% White, 0.4% Native American, 0.2% Asian, 2.1% Two or More Races, and 1.0% Some Other Race. 1.8% of the population was of Hispanic or Latino origin.

Historical population
Year	Pop.	±%
1990	2,696	—
2000	2,004	−25.7%
2010	1,673	−16.5%
2020	1,359	−18.8%
