= Baden, St. Louis =

Neighborhood of St. Louis in Missouri, US

Coordinates: 38.7145°N 90.2350°W

Baden
- Neighborhood of St. Louis
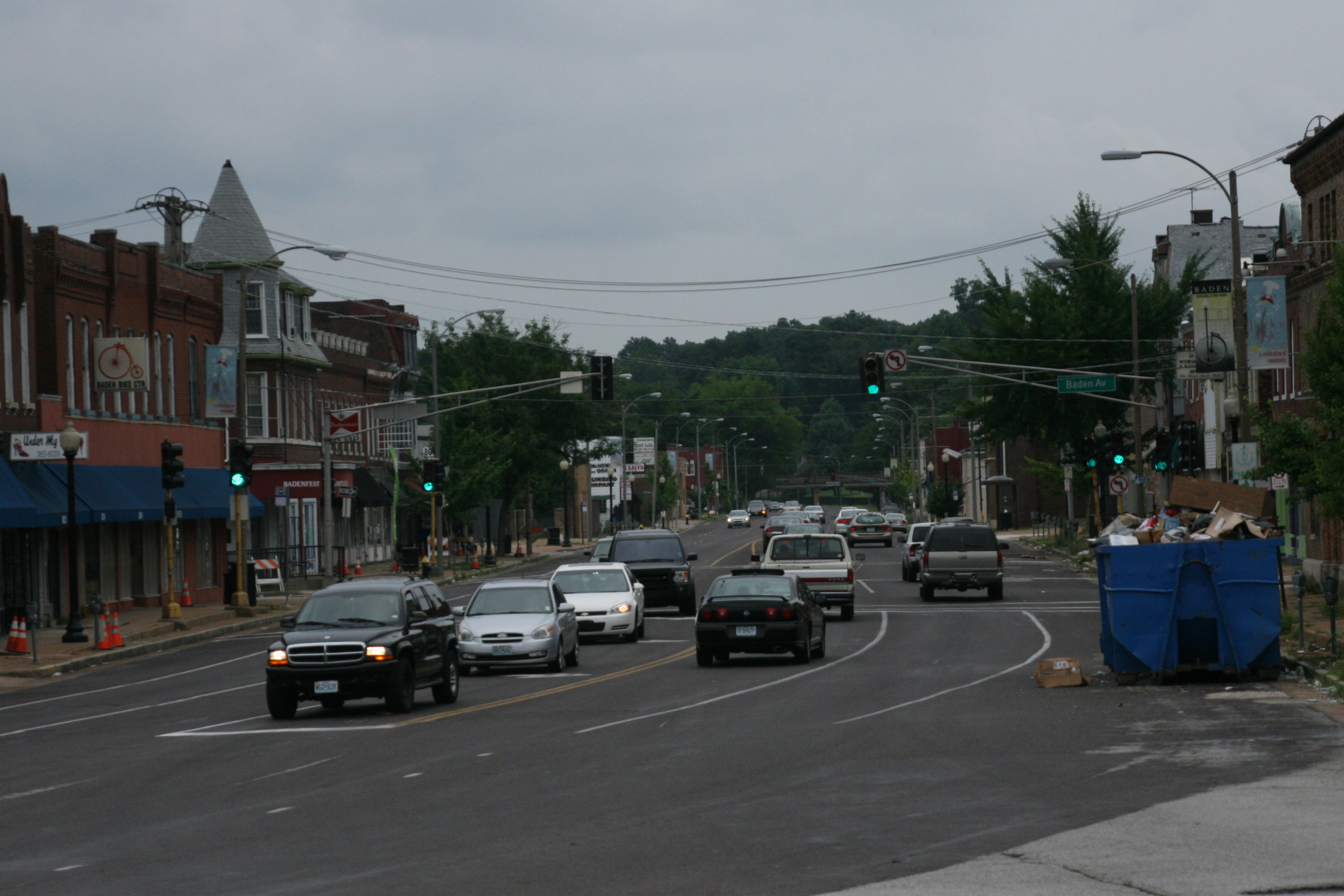
- North Broadway Street, Baden, July 2013

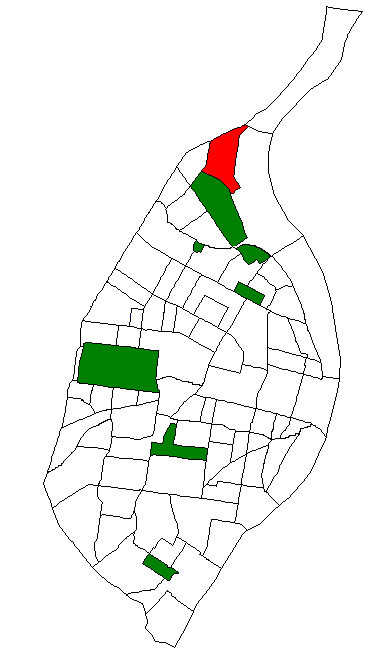
- Location (red) of Baden within St. Louis
- Country: United States
- State: Missouri
- City: St. Louis
- Named for: Baden, Germany
- Wards: 12, 13

Government
  - Alderpersons: Sharon Tyus, Pam Boyd

Area
  - Total: 1.06 sq mi (2.7 km^{2})

Population (2020)
  - Total: 5,465
  - Density: 5,160/sq mi (1,990/km^{2})

Demographics 2020
  - White: 3.9%
  - Black: 91.8%
  - Hispanic: 0.8%
  - Asian: 0.1%
  - Other: 3.8%
- ZIP code(s): Parts of 63147 and 63137
- Area code(s): 314
- Website: stlouis-mo.gov

Baden is a neighborhood of St. Louis, Missouri.

== Demographics ==
Historical population
Census	Pop.	Note	%±
1990	7,156		—
2000	8,439		17.9%
2010	7,268		−13.9%
2020	5,465		−24.8%

In 2020, Baden's racial makeup was 91.8% black, 3.9% white, 0.4% Native American, 0.1% Asian, 3.4% two or more races, and 0.4% some other race. 0.8% of Baden's population was of Hispanic or Latino origin.

== History ==
Baden became a part of the City of St. Louis in 1876 by the state legislature. Baden's population was about 400 people. The neighborhood was located on the St. Louis, Kansas City and Northwestern Railroad, popularly known as the "Wabash". In this neighborhood, there were 11 stores, three wagon shops, four churches, four schools (one public, two Catholic, and one Lutheran), as well as a post office, known to locals as "the Baden Station".

=== Institutions ===
The Lutheran Altenheim or Nursing Home at 8721 Halls Ferry Road was constructed in 1929, with additions in 1963 and 1972. The home features ramps instead of stairways for the safe and comfortable movement of residents within the fireproof building. (It was sold recently to a non-sectarian nursing home enterprise.) A number of historic churches, most of them originally Germanic background, anchor the Baden neighborhood and still operate. Noteworthy among these are Holy Cross Roman Catholic Church (now called Our Lady of the Holy Cross) and Ebenezer Lutheran Church (Lutheran Church–Missouri Synod), both of which date from the mid-19th Century. The other remaining churches are largely African-American Protestant churches, frequently those buying formerly white churches from the original Baden congregations (e.g., the former St. Stephens Evangelical and Reformed Church). The former largely Irish background, Our Lady of Mount Carmel Church, was merged into Holy Cross Parish and now meets at the Holy Cross church site. Mount Carmel is now House of Light Church, an African-American Protestant congregation.

The Friedens U.C.C. Cemetery, an historic non-sectarian burial ground dating from 1859 (originally owned by the Friedens German Evangelical and Reformed Church at 19th and Newhouse in the city's Hyde Park neighborhood) and frequently patronized by German-American and African-American Protestant funerals, is located at North Broadway and Jennings Station Road. The original Old Bethlehem Lutheran Cemetery, on Church Road behind the Holy Cross Catholic Parish, was closed in 1949 and relocated to the New Bethlehem Cemetery, four miles north on Bellefontaine Road in the North St. Louis County suburb of Bellefontaine Neighbors, which still operates today, offering interment space to patrons of all faiths, but primarily the German-American Lutheran and African-American Protestant communities. Many of the original landowners of the "Halls Ferry Circle" area of Baden are buried in this historic cemetery, along with John and Casper Beiderwieden, first Lutheran funeral home operators in the City of St. Louis, and Emil Heintzenroeder, who operated a funeral home in Baden on Halls Ferry Road that served all residents until the 1970s. Many notable Lutheran pastors who were instrumental in the development of the Lutheran Church–Missouri Synod in the 19th and early 20th centuries are buried in the New Bethlehem Cemetery. A number of German Evangelical pastors (among them Reverend Kopf, founder of Friedens Cemetery) who developed the Evangelical and Reformed Church in the U.S. (merging with the Puritan-background Congregationalists in 1957, forming today's United Church of Christ) are buried at Friedens.

The regionally-historic Calvary (Roman Catholic, 1854) and Bellefontaine Cemeteries (1849), located immediately south of the Wabash railroad tracks and overpass on North Broadway, abut the informal southern boundaries of the Baden Historic District. Many Baden residents and families are also interred in these two historic cemeteries.

== Residential ==
Single family homes predominate in the Baden area, especially in the newer sections "on the hill" and westward toward Riverview Boulevard and in the Veronica Park neighborhood. Flats are found on streets such as Bitner and Church Road near the business district at Halls Ferry and Broadway. An old landmark is the Kraft house at 1086 Bittner Street, which is said to have been built over a century ago. While it is one of the oldest outlying community areas in St. Louis, Baden today presents itself as a convenient and attractive residential area, with some of its subdivision platted as recently as 1948.

== Public services ==
=== Water ===
In the early years Baden's water supply was obtained from wells and cisterns; the first pumping station was installed about 1830. The second pumping station was installed at Bissell's Point in 1880. In 1887 construction of a new low service pumping station at Chain of Rocks was authorized. This plant went into service in 1895. The third pumping station, in Baden in 1898, was high service and was on a conduit line from Chain of Rocks to Bissell's Point. In 1905 seven foot conduits was built to Chain of Rocks. At that point Baden reservoir was constructed. All the pumping stations were joined by an electric and steam railroad by the water department.

In 1915 the world's largest filter plant was installed at Chain of Rocks. It had 40 filters stretching along an aisle which has a length of 700 feet (210 m). In 1923 the bond issue project began the new waterworks at Howard Bend on the Missouri River, the initial service began in 1929. In 1960 a high powered electric service pumping station was installed, causing the Baden steam powered station to be abandoned.

=== Baden Schools ===
The first public school, opened in 1872, was a one-room building at Christian and Switzer Avenue. Before 1872 the students in Baden attended a school in rural Missouri. In 1878 the Board of Education purchased a brick building at Church Road and Bittner Ave., a three-story building with six rooms accommodating 240 students. At that time the first public school one room building was opened for African American students, which was initially named Colored School #11 and later renamed Aldridge School. In 1900 this school became inadequate and portable units were erected in its yard. In 1904 a kindergarten class was opened up in the portable building. In 1906 another portable building was open at Halls Ferry and Gimblin. The final Baden School at 8724 Halls Ferry Road, opened in 1908, and closed in 2009.

=== Library ===
In earlier years residents of Baden obtained library books through a local store where books were deposited and returned for delivery to Central Library downtown. Efforts by the Baden public school groups resulted in the establishment of a branch library in an old mounted police station at 8316 North Broadway in 1928. The present branch library building at 8448 Church Road was completed by 1960.

=== Parks ===
Public park area in the Baden area is rather limited in extent. A Baden playground between Church and Halls Ferry Road was purchased in 1938. It was the site of the first Church of Our Lady of Mount Carmel, built in 1873. For a short time it was known as the Joseph F. Dickmann Playground. For many years the grounds of the Baden pumping station were landscaped by the City Water Division as a local garden spot. Tennis courts were maintained on Baden Avenue near the greenhouses. David Hickey Park at 8700 North Broadway was acquired by the Park Department in 1947. The 16.26-acre (65,800 m^{2}) park was given the name of a previous park that was absorbed in the site of the Small Arms Plants about 1939-40. Charles Busche Park at Broadway and Calvary covers 6 acres (24,000 m^{2}) and was acquired in 1931. Chain of Rocks Park, with its picnic grounds and views of the river from hillside roadways, was acquired by the Water Division in 1893. The 29.76-acre (120,400 m^{2}) park was landscaped about 1910 and is one of the few city parks not under the jurisdiction of the Park Department. North of Chain of Rocks is the North Shore Country Club which began as a boat club in 1916. A golf course and swimming pool were added in 1919, when it was known as the Riverview Country Club. It received its name in 1929.

=== Fire and police station ===
Before the advent of the regular fire department, fire alarms were sounded by church bells and bucket brigades formed lines from the nearest pump to the fire. Baden's first engine house was built about 1897 just north of the location of the present fire station, which was erected in 1909. In 1919 the fire company was fully motorized, replacing the colorful horse-drawn fire apparatus. The greatest fire to occur in the area happened when the St. Louis Car Company shops burned for several days in October 1920. Baden's first regular police station was a branch of the old Mounted District in Forest Park. It was located at 8316 North Broadway and was opened in 1899. This was closed in 1928, at which time it was leased for a public library branch.

== Economy ==
=== Commercial businesses ===
Although Baden was never incorporated as a city, it has had the characteristics of a town for many years. The business section along Broadway and Hall Ferry Road had its origin more than a century ago and its own post office, fire station, library, and schools have served the area for many years. Among the business achievement have been the opening of the Baden Bank in 1909 and the founding of the Businessmen's Association in 1913.

=== Industry ===
Two important industrial plants began operations in Baden during the late nineties. The St. Louis Car Company occupied its 52-acre (210,000 m^{2}) site in 1898 after moving from 3300 North Broadway and in 1899 Paulus Gast opened his brewery on Hornsby Avenue. He had previously operated a wine company and a vineyard. The Charter Oak Stove and Range Company located at Hall and Antelope Streets in 1921. In more recent years the Hall Street vicinity has become a center for truck terminals and the street has been widened into a divided highway. Near its end at Riverview Drive are the Missouri Portland Cement Company and the GAF Corporation, a manufacturer of building products. Except for a shopping center near Broadway, commercial activity along Riverview Drive is negligible. Also, the St. Louis Malleable Casting Co. at Hall Street and Antelope, which opened in 1921, was an important industry.

== Transportation ==
=== Public transit ===
The earliest form of public transit serving the Baden area was a line of horse-drawn omnibuses, which ran down Broadway to East Grand Avenue. Fred Kraft and Jacob Bittner started it during the first St. Louis Fair in 1856. A similar line ran on Broadway from Third and Market Street to Breman, beginning in 1845, operated by Erastus Wells and Calvin Case. This line was later extended to Bissell's Point. In 1870, Case purchased the Baden line and converted it into a horse car line by laying a single track from the market house in Baden to Gano Avenue. The horse walked on a plank walk in the center of the track and passengers sometimes had to help put the car back upon the rails. Three open sided cars were used, which had canvas curtains for use in bad weather. Baden and St. Louis Railroad Company later became a division of the St. Louis Railroad Company with offices at 3700 North Broadway. This company operated a cable line on Broadway from East Grand south to Keokuk Street. All divisions of this company were electrified during the 1890s and were absorbed by the United Railways Company in the transit consolidation of 1899. Since August 1956, buses have replaced streetcars on the Broadway line. The water division operated an electric trolley line from Baden to Chain of Rocks for many years. It is now a freight hauling line with a connection to the Burlington Railroad.

=== Railroads ===
Railroads played an important part in Baden's development. The first one to be built through the area was the Wabash in 1855, when it was known as the North Missouri Railroad. Originally, it ran from Second and North Market Street in St. Louis to the bank of Missouri River opposite St. Charles. Two trains were operated daily in each direction carrying freight and passengers on weekdays and passengers only on Sundays. The station for Baden was situated at Bittner Street and Switzer Avenue, a short distance west of Broadway, while the suburban Inglesyde station was located at the present Park Lane. A regular commuter train to St. Charles, Burlington-Northern tracks through the Hall Street area east of Baden. A large Katy yard is at the foot of Gimblin Street. Formerly, a Terminal Railroad track left the Burlington line just north of St. Cyr Road and ran westward to join the Wabash tracks in Ferguson.

=== Highways ===
Principal highways radiating from Baden are extensions of Broadway, Halls Ferry, and Riverview Blvd. The latter, on its northward course along the Mississippi, is known as Riverview Drive. It provides an important link between Chain of Rocks and Highway 270 to Baden, via a scenic riverside route. Interstate 270 crosses Riverview north of the waterworks, connecting northern St. Louis County with Illinois. The old Chain of Rocks Bridge, built in 1929, has been closed since the new one was opened, and various ideas are being considered for its future use. Near the old bridge are two mid-river intake towers for the waterworks, which are considered to be architecturally significant landmarks. Chain of Rocks takes its name from a partially submerged rock formation, a former impediment to navigation. The Chain of Rocks locks and canal have circumvented it. The Riverview panhandle of the 1876 city limits was designed to furnish an in-city waterworks location sufficiently upriver to procure a cleaner supply of water than could be obtained from the old waterworks at Bissell's Point.
