= Mark Twain, St. Louis =

Neighborhood of St. Louis in Missouri, US

Coordinates: 38.6899°N 90.2417°W

Mark Twain
- Neighborhood of St. Louis
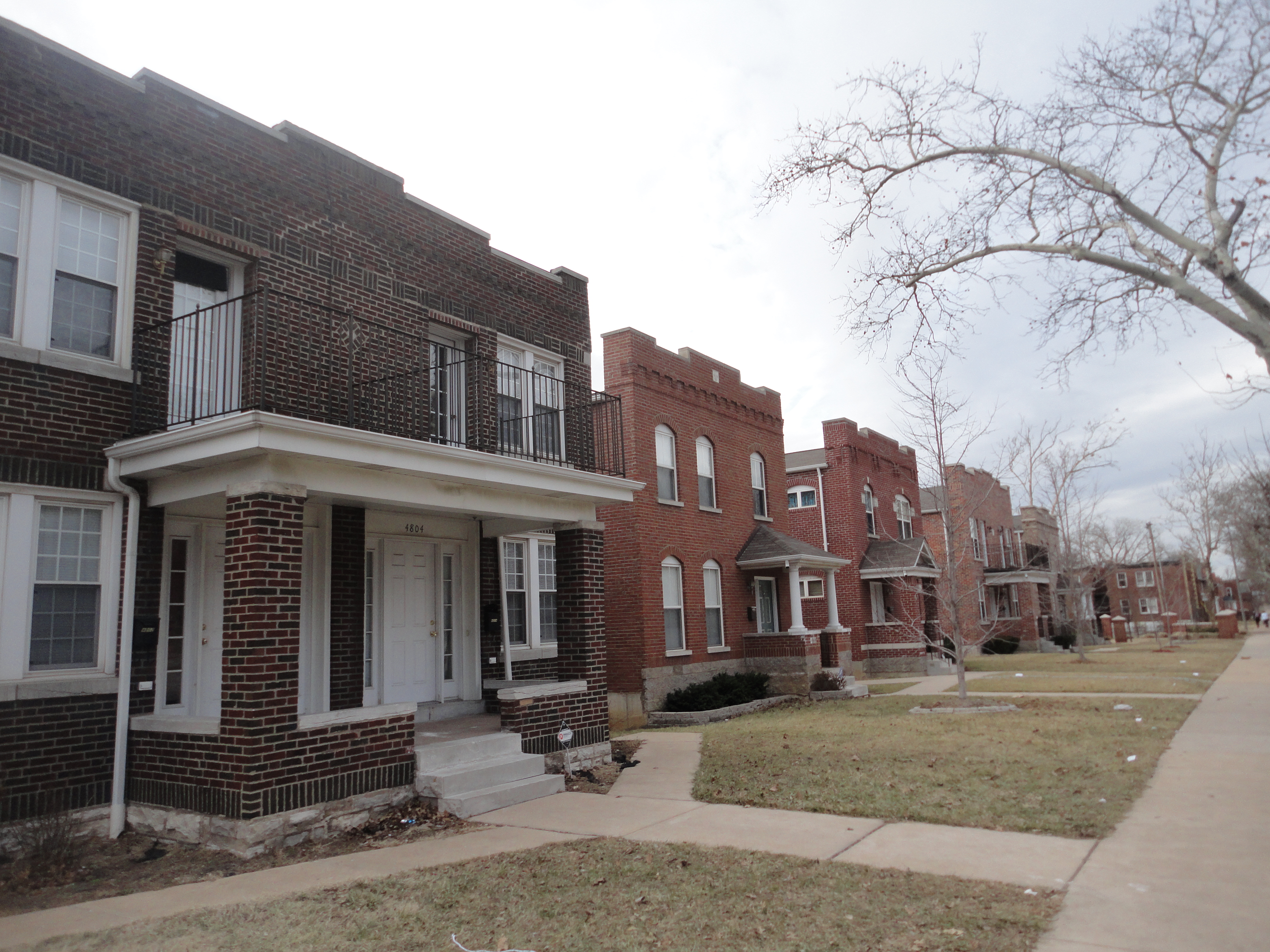
- Houses in Mark Twain, February 2011

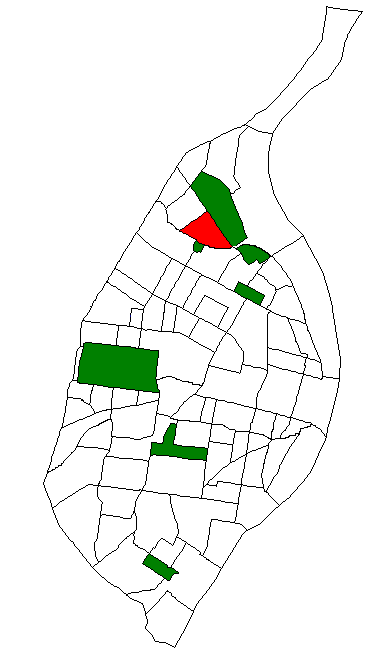
- Location (red) of Mark Twain within St. Louis
- Country: United States
- State: Missouri
- City: St. Louis
- Wards: 12, 13

Government
  - Aldermen: Sharon Tyus, Pam Boyd

Area
  - Total: 0.65 sq mi (1.7 km^{2})

Population (2020)
  - Total: 3,257
  - Density: 5,000/sq mi (1,900/km^{2})
- ZIP code(s): Parts of 63115, 63120
- Area code(s): 314
- Website: stlouis-mo.gov

Mark Twain is a neighborhood of St. Louis, Missouri named after author and Missouri native Mark Twain. It is located between Interstate 70 and Bellefontaine Cemetery.

== Demographics ==
Historical population
Census	Pop.	Note	%±
1990	6,902		—
2000	4,999		−27.6%
2010	4,188		−16.2%
2020	3,257		−22.2%

In 2020 Mark Twain's racial makeup was 95.1% Black, 2.4% White, 0.2% Native American, 0.3% Asian, 1.4% Two or More Races, and 0.6% Some Other Race. 1.0% of the population was of Hispanic or Latino origin.
