= North Point, St. Louis =

Neighborhood of St. Louis in Missouri, US

Coordinates: 38.7159°N 90.2472°W

North Point
- Neighborhood of St. Louis
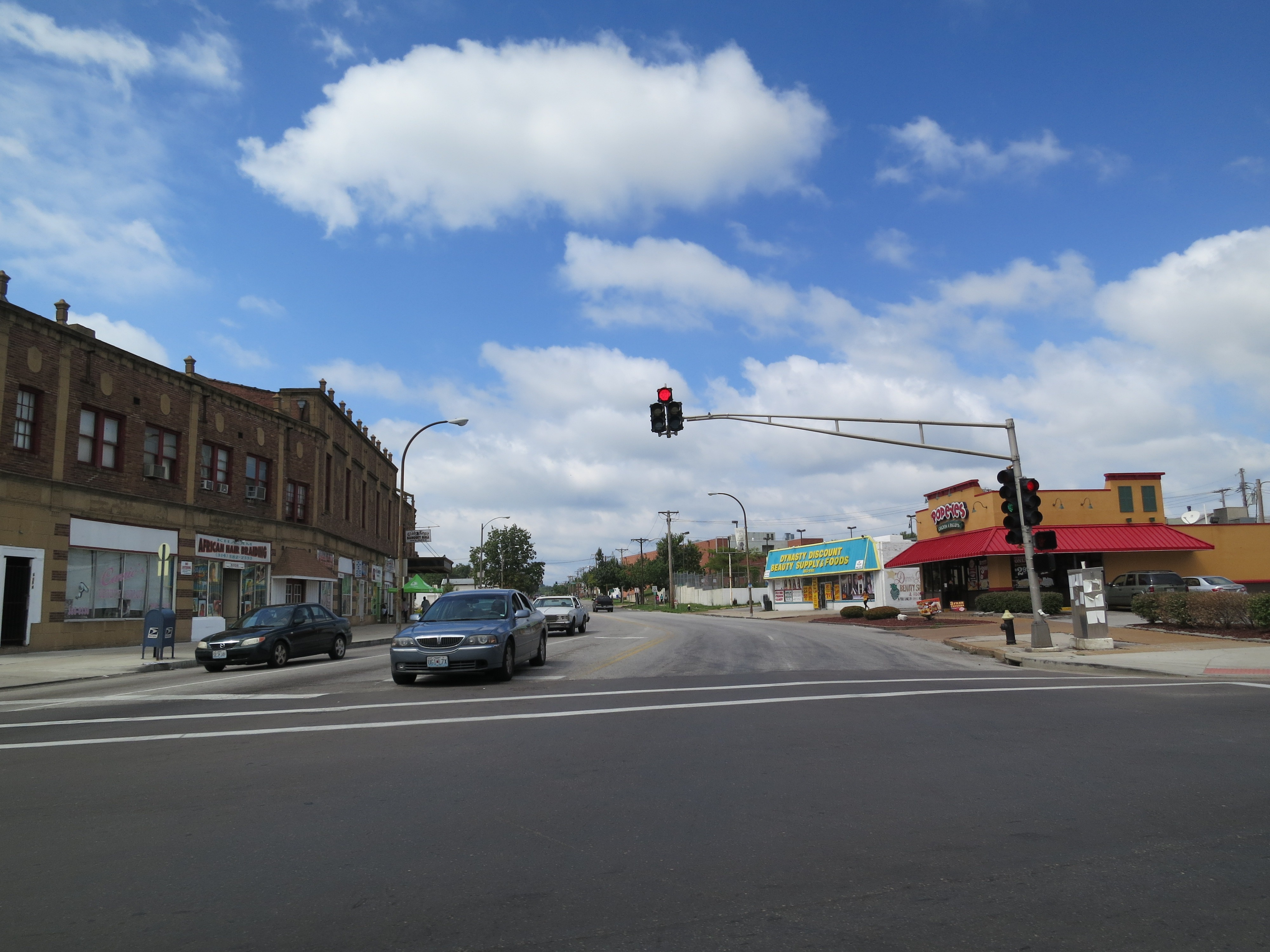
- Intersection in North Point, September 2012

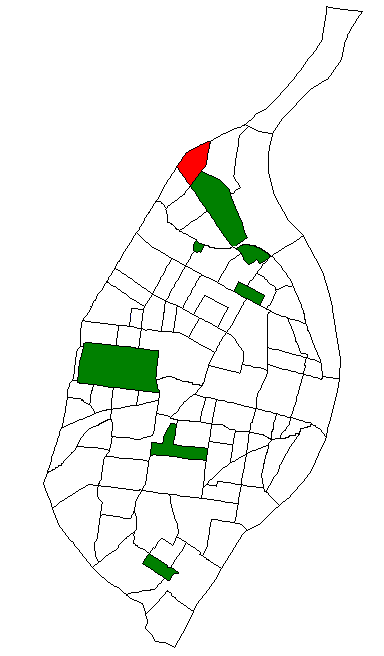
- Location (red) of North Point within St. Louis
- Country: United States
- State: Missouri
- City: St. Louis
- Wards: 13

Government
  - Aldermen: Pam Boyd

Area
  - Total: 0.52 sq mi (1.3 km^{2})

Population (2020)
  - Total: 3,396
  - Density: 6,500/sq mi (2,500/km^{2})
- ZIP code(s): Part of 63147
- Area code(s): 314
- Website: stlouis-mo.gov

North Point (or North Pointe) is a neighborhood of St. Louis, Missouri, US. It is bounded by Goodfellow on the North, Northcrest, West Florissant on the Southwest, and Riverview Boulevard on the East and Northeast.

== Education ==
- Herzog Elementary School
- Lot a Luv
- New Northside Child Development Center
- Northwest Middle School
- Hilltop Child Development Center

== Churches ==
- Mizpah Lutheran Church
- North Park United Methodist Church

== Demographics ==
Historical population
Census	Pop.	Note	%±
1990	5,657		—
2000	4,327		−23.5%
2010	3,966		−8.3%
2020	3,396		−14.4%

In 2020 North Pointe's racial makeup was 95.3% Black, 1.6% White, 0.1% American Indian, 2.5% Two or More Races, and 0.4% Some Other Race. 0.8% of the population was of Latino origin.
