= Delmar Boulevard =

Street in St. Louis, Missouri, U.S.

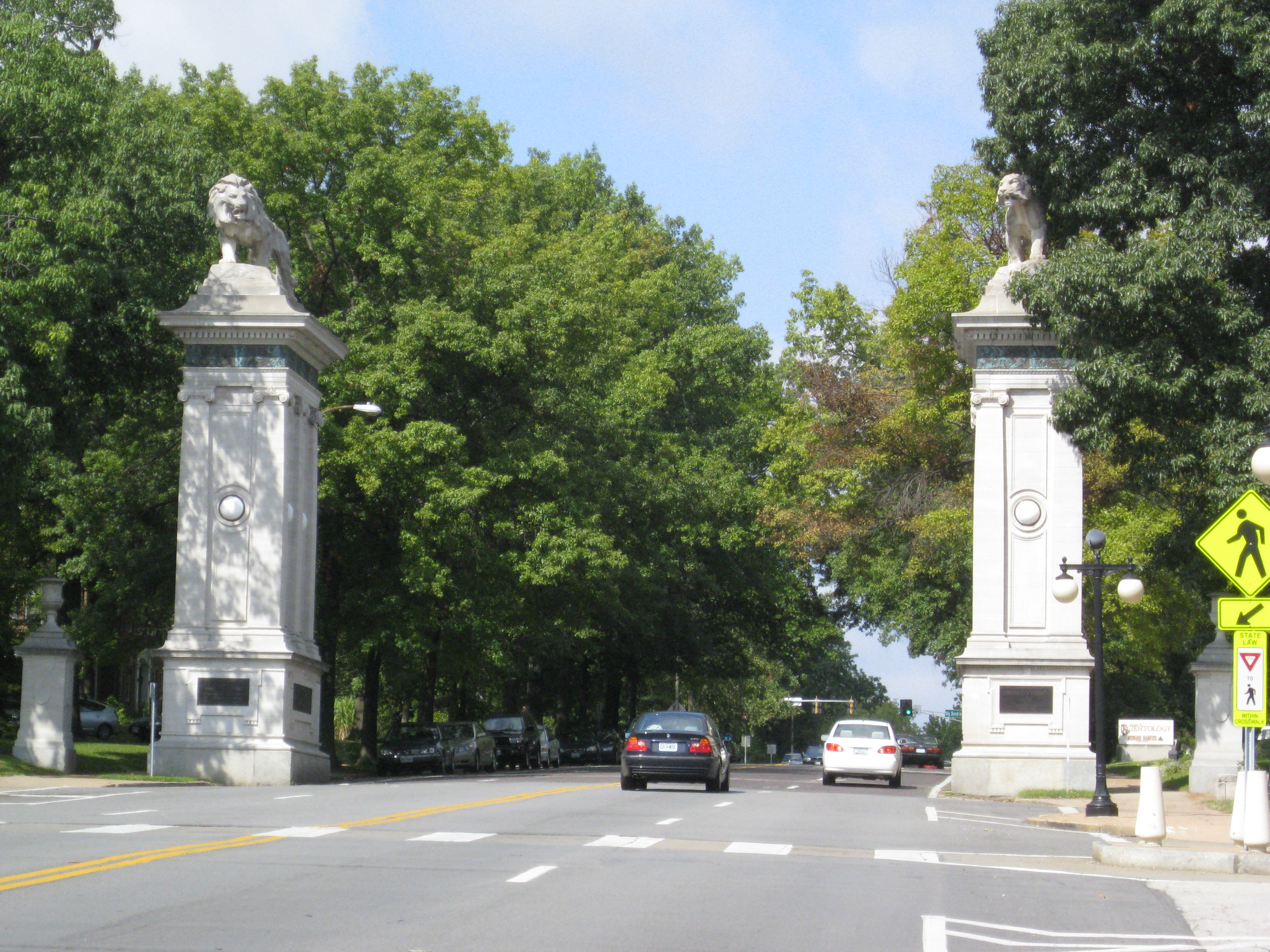
- "Gates of Opportunity" on Delmar Boulevard in University City
- Namesake: Delaware and Maryland
- Owner: City of St. Louis and University City
- Maintained by: St. Louis City Street Department and University City Public Works and Parks Department, Street Maintenance Division
- Length: 9.1 mi (14.6 km)
- Location: University City–St. Louis Missouri
- West end: Price Road in University City
- Major junctions: I-170 in University City
- East end: North 14th Street in Downtown, St. Louis

Delmar Boulevard is a major east-west street in St. Louis, Missouri, United States.

== Route description ==
Delmar Boulevard starts at North 14th Street in Downtown St. Louis, as a westward extension of Convention Plaza. It passes through the neighborhoods of Downtown West and Midtown on its easternmost portions. Just west of Jefferson Avenue, at number 2658, is the Scott Joplin House State Historic Site.

Delmar is interrupted at Spring Avenue by Cardinal Ritter College Prep High School; the street picks up again at Vandeventer Avenue, two blocks to the west. At Taylor Avenue, Delmar (which has been traveling west-northwest up to this point) assumes a more due westerly course. Between here and Skinker Boulevard, the boulevard passes through the neighborhoods of Vandeventer, Lewis Place, Fountain Park, Academy, Visitation Park, West End, and Skinker/DeBaliviere, passing many disused and derelict buildings.

West of the MetroLink tracks at Rosedale Avenue, Delmar's character changes as the street enters the Delmar Loop, a neighborhood popular with students of nearby Washington University in St. Louis and known for many eclectic shops and restaurants. The Delmar Loop is home to several area landmarks, such as the Tivoli Theater and Blueberry Hill. On the Loop, just west of Skinker, Delmar leaves the City of St. Louis and enters the St. Louis County suburb of University City. West of Trinity Avenue, Delmar climbs a hill out of the Loop. Beyond this point, Delmar changes to a largely residential character, which it assumes for the rest of its route. After about two miles, Delmar crosses Interstate 170, where it has an interchange (Exit 2), before coming to an end at Price Road shortly thereafter.

Delmar is often considered to represent a major socioeconomic divide in the city, having come to demarcate the poorer, largely African American neighborhoods located to the north from the more affluent (and largely white) ones to the south; this phenomenon is called the "Delmar Divide".

== Transportation ==
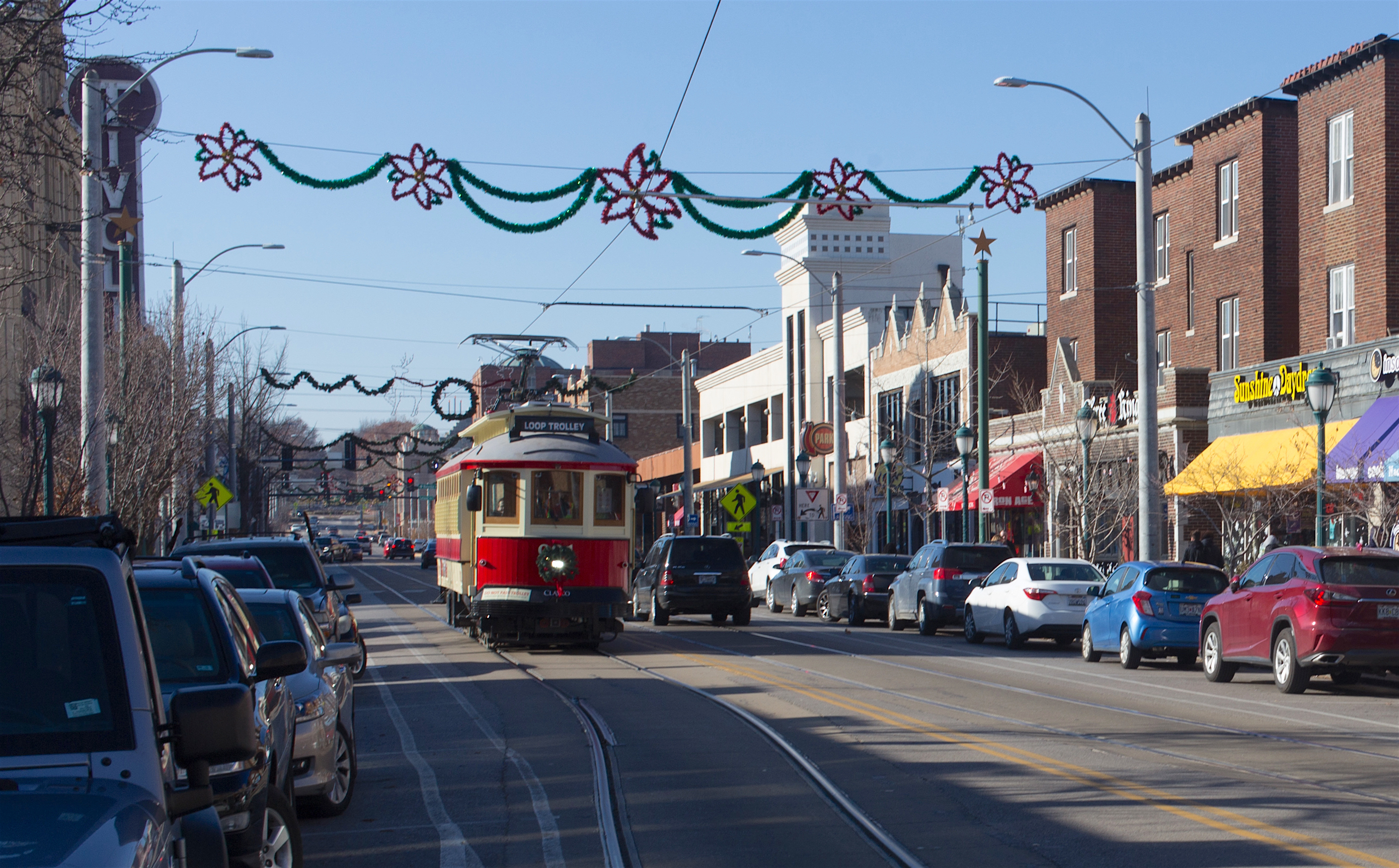
A Loop Trolley car on Delmar Blvd. in University City

Delmar Boulevard is served by the Loop Trolley line, which opened in 2018, the 97 Delmar bus, and by Delmar station on MetroLink, St. Louis' light-rail line connecting the airport with downtown.

The Hodiamont streetcar ran a few blocks north of Delmar, connecting Hodiamont Avenue with Enright Avenue west of Vandeventer. The old right-of-way still exists as an alley and is marked as "Hodiamont Streetcar R-O-W" or "Suburban Track" on many maps of the area.

== History ==
Delmar was originally known as Morgan Street until 1933.

According to Norbury L. Wayman in his circa 1980 series History of St. Louis Neighborhoods, the name Delmar was coined when two early landowners living on opposite sides of the road, one from Delaware and one from Maryland, combined the names of their home states. The town of Delmar, Delaware, on the border between the two states, derived its name in similar fashion.

In 2009, the portion of Delmar within the city of St. Louis was given the honorary name of Barack Obama Boulevard to honor the newly elected president.

== See also ==
- JeffVanderLou, St. Louis, a neighborhood north of Delmar that was once considered the city's "Negro district", where African Americans were allowed to own land
- The Ville, St. Louis, the neighborhood where the city's hospital for African Americans was located during segregation
