= Wydown/Skinker, St. Louis =

Neighborhood of St. Louis in Missouri, US

Coordinates: 38.6396°N 90.3044°W

Wydown/Skinker
- Neighborhood of St. Louis
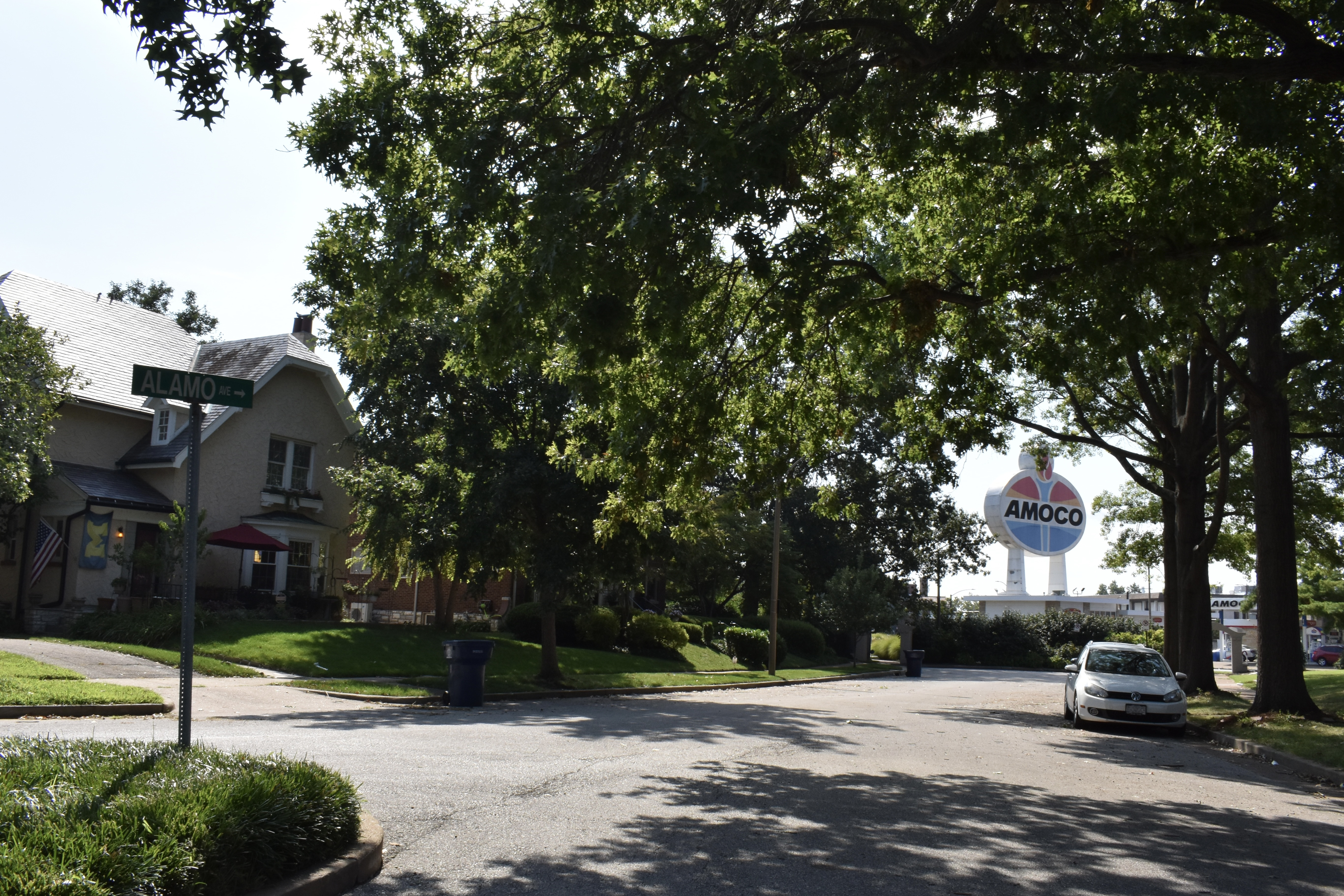
- Wydown Skinker in 2026

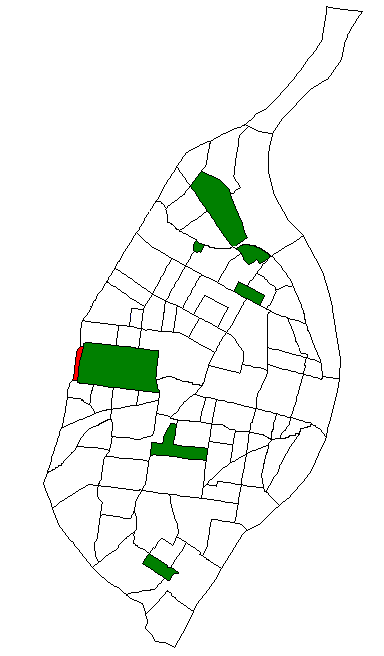
- Location (red) of Wydown/Skinker within St. Louis
- Country: United States
- State: Missouri
- City: St. Louis
- Wards: 10

Government
  - Aldermen: Shameem Clark Hubbard

Area
  - Total: 0.13 sq mi (0.34 km^{2})

Population (2020)
  - Total: 1,121
  - Density: 8,600/sq mi (3,300/km^{2})
- ZIP code(s): Part of 63105
- Area code(s): 314
- Website: stlouis-mo.gov

Wydown/Skinker is a neighborhood in St. Louis, Missouri. Washington University in St. Louis is located just north of this neighborhood. The neighborhood is bounded by the city limits on the west, Forsyth Boulevard on the north, Forest Park (Skinker Blvd.) on the east and Clayton Avenue on the south. The Missouri Historical Society Library & Research Center is located in the Wydown/Skinker neighborhood.

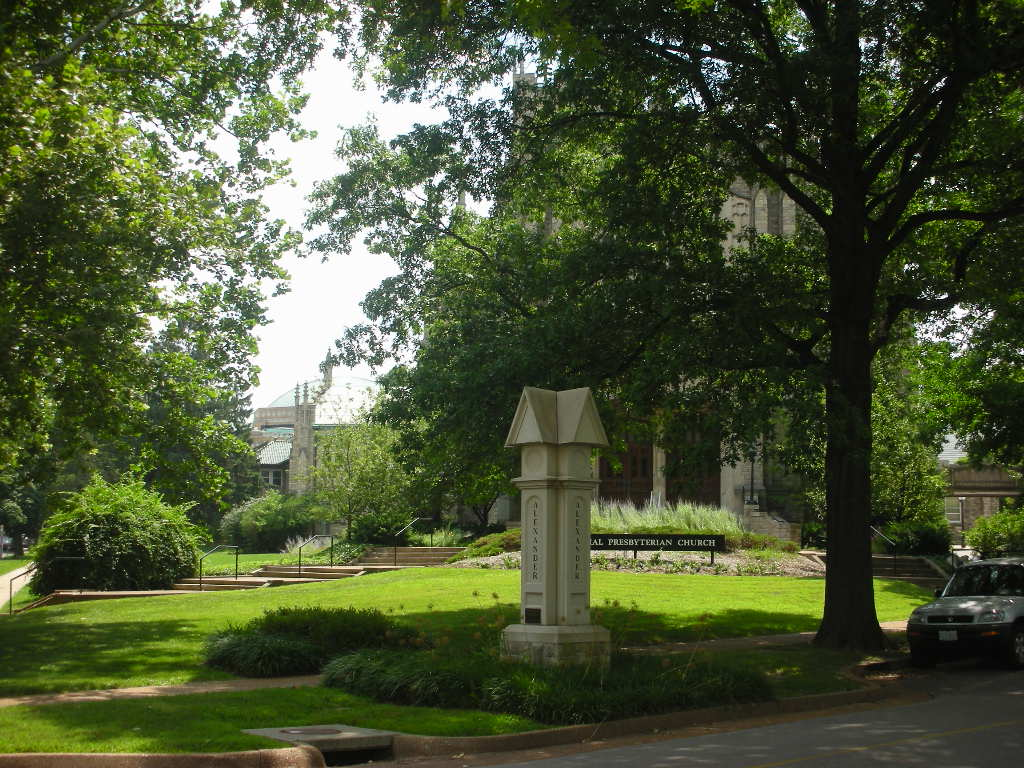
Memorial Presbyterian Church (foreground) and the Missouri Historical Society (aft, in a former synagogue) are both located in the small neighborhood of Wydown/Skinker.

== Demographics ==
Historical population
Year	Pop.	±%
1990	1,169	—
2000	1,056	−9.7%
2010	1,054	−0.2%
2020	1,121	+6.4%

In 2020 Wydown/Skinker's racial makeup was 73.4% White, 2.9% Black, 18.5% Asian, 4.6% Two or More Races, and 0.3% Some Other Race. 3.7% of the people were of Hispanic or Latino origin.

Racial composition	1990	2000	2010	2020
White	93.4%	90.2%	85.7%	73.4%
Black or African American	4.7%	2.5%	3.4%	2.9%
Hispanic or Latino (of any race)		1.9%	3.1%	3.7%
Asian		5.5%	7.5%	18.5%
