= Skinker DeBaliviere, St. Louis =

Neighborhood of St. Louis in Missouri, US

Coordinates: 38.6513°N 90.2942°W

Skinker DeBaliviere
- Neighborhood of St. Louis
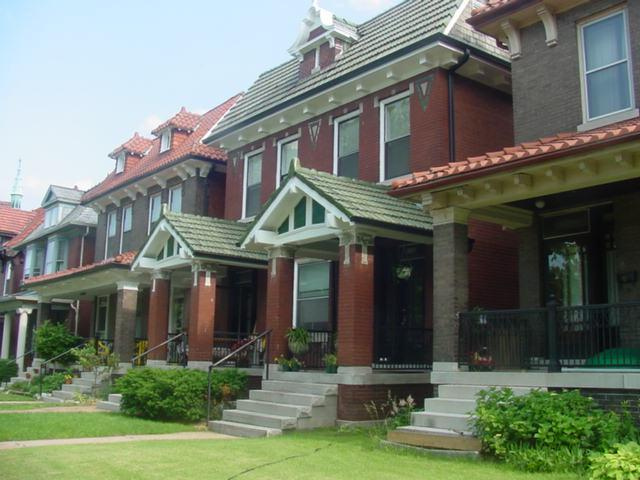
- Two-family flats in the Skinker DeBaliviere neighborhood

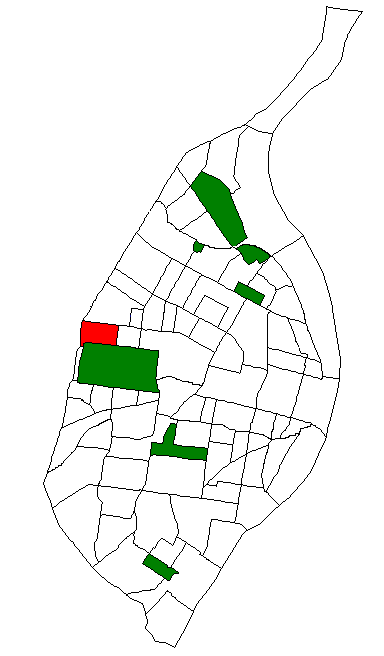
- Location (red) of Skinker DeBaliviere within St. Louis
- Country: United States
- State: Missouri
- City: St. Louis
- Wards: 10

Government
  - Aldermen: Shameem Clark Hubbard

Area
  - Total: 0.52 sq mi (1.3 km^{2})

Population (2020)
  - Total: 3,899
  - Density: 7,500/sq mi (2,900/km^{2})
- ZIP code(s): Part of 63112
- Area code(s): 314
- Website: stlouis-mo.gov

Skinker DeBaliviere (/dəˈbɑːlɪvər/ də-BAH-lih-vər) is a neighborhood of St. Louis, Missouri, located directly north of Forest Park. In addition to the park, its boundaries are Delmar Boulevard to the north, DeBaliviere Avenue to the east, and the western city limits near Skinker Boulevard. It is home to The Pageant, Pin-up Bowl, and all the other establishments of the Delmar Loop east of University City. It also includes the west end of the Forest Park – DeBaliviere and the entire Skinker MetroLink stations. The Delmar Loop station is just outside of its north boundary. In 1978, the neighborhood was designated a Local Historic District by the City of St. Louis, and the private subdivision of Parkview is listed in the National Register of Historic Places.

== History ==
The neighborhood was founded in 1908, part of a period of major development and rapid growth in the area following the 1904 World's Fair and Olympic Games. In 1914, Hamilton Elementary School was founded, and the 1910s also saw the building of three new churches that today are still present in the neighborhood: Grace Methodist, New Cote Brilliante Baptist, and St. Roch Catholic, which also opened up its own school. The neighborhood became racially integrated in 1964, and unlike many other St. Louis area neighborhoods, it has remained racially and socio-economically diverse. The Skinker-DeBaliviere Community Council, established in 1966 by the three area churches, Washington University in St. Louis, and two neighborhood groups, has been one of the main factors in ensuring the neighborhood's stability, as has the volunteer-run, the investment in property in the neighborhood by Washington University, and the expansion of the Delmar Loop into the city. In October 2008, the neighborhood celebrated its centennial anniversary; the mayor of St. Louis, Francis G. Slay, declared October 11 to be the official celebrated Skinker-DeBaliviere Centennial Day in the city of St. Louis from that day forward.

== Notable residents ==
- Harland Bartholomew, the first full-time urban planner employed by an American city
- Bernard Dickmann, 34th mayor of St. Louis
- Michael Harrington, author of The Other America, political activist, political theorist, professor of political science, radio commentator and founding member of the Democratic Socialists of America
- Vincent Schoemehl, 42nd mayor of St. Louis

== Demographics ==
Historical population
Year	Pop.	±%
1990	5,601	—
2000	4,501	−19.6%
2010	4,077	−9.4%
2020	3,899	−4.4%

In 2020 Skinker-Debaliviere's population was 48.6% White, 29.4% Black, 0.4% Native American, 13.2% Asian, 6.7% Two or More Races, and 1.6% Some Other Race. 4.2% of the population was of Hispanic or Latino origin.

Racial composition	1990	2000	2010	2020
White	41.3%	42.1%	49.8%	48.6%
Black or African American	56.1%	49.6%	37.9%	29.4%
Hispanic or Latino (of any race)	N/A	1.8%	3.0%	4.2%
Asian	N/A	4.6%	8.7%	13.2%

== See also ==
- Delmar Loop
