= List of tornadoes striking downtown areas of large cities =

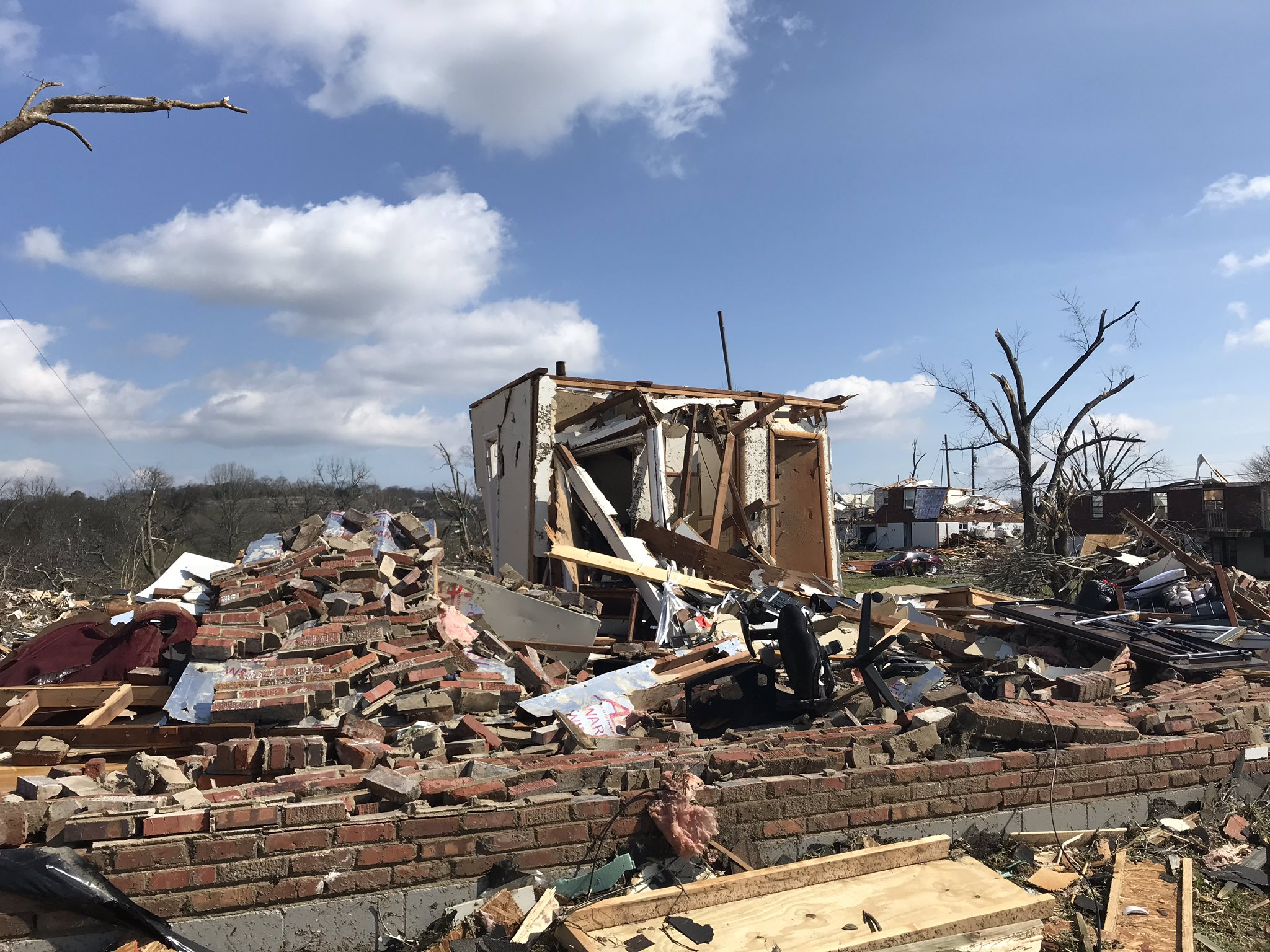
EF3 damage after an intense tornado struck Nashville, Tennessee in 2020.

This article is a list of tornadoes that have impacted the central business district (downtown or city center) of a large city (that is, one having at least 50,000 people, not counting suburbs or outlying communities, at the time of the storm).

It is a common myth that tornadoes do not strike downtown areas. The odds are much lower due to the small areas covered, but tornadoes can go anywhere, including over downtown areas. St. Louis, Missouri has taken a direct hit four times in less than a century. Many of the tornadoes listed were extremely destructive or caused numerous casualties, and the occurrence of a catastrophic event somewhere is inevitable.

This list is not exhaustive (listing every single tornado that has struck a downtown area or central business district of any city), as it may never be known if a tornado struck a downtown area, or if it was just a microburst (powerful downward and outward gush of wind, which cause damage from straight-line winds), particularly for older events or from areas with limited information. Downbursts often accompany intense tornadoes, extending damage across a wider area than the tornado path. When a tornado strikes a city, it is occasionally very difficult to determine whether it was a tornadic event at all or if the affected area was indeed the "downtown", "city center", or "central business district" consisting of very high population density and mid to high-rises, as opposed to other heavily urbanized/built-up parts of the city or suburbs. It is sometimes also difficult to determine tornadoes that strike urban cores before 1950, when tornado records (particularly in the US) started to be consistently logged with detail. Before this, lack of details on information from the events, as well as that most cities were far smaller in area and population complicate the record.

For the list of cities that are not listed here for certain reasons, see below.

== North America ==
Note: The F-Scale was superseded by the EF scale in the U.S. on February 1, 2007, and in Canada on April 1, 2013
For tornadoes and cities in: United States, Canada, Mexico, Bahamas, Cuba, Central America, and the Caribbean. Ratings for tornadoes in the United States prior to 1950 are not official but are instead estimates made by tornado expert Tom Grazulis.

List of tornadoes striking downtown areas of large cities
F#/EF#	Location	Date	Casualties	Summary
F3	St. Louis, Missouri	March 8, 1871	9	See article on this tornado — The tornado killed 9 and injured a further 60 in downtown St. Louis.
F3	Chicago, Illinois	May 6, 1876	2	A multi-vortex tornado moved through downtown Chicago, destroying several buildings.
F2	Kansas City, Missouri	May 13, 1883	3	The tornado moved along an erratic path in Kansas City, killing 3 and injuring several more.
F2	Washington, D.C.	September 16, 1888	0	The tornado tracked 2 miles across downtown Washington, D.C. along Maryland Avenue, damaging two homes and partially deroofed the Smithsonian Institution Building.
F4	Louisville, Kentucky	March 27, 1890	76	See section on this tornado — The tornado tracked 15 miles (24 km) through downtown Louisville, inflicting $75 million (1890 USD) in damages to several structures.
F2	Dallas, Texas	January 20, 1894	1	A tornado tore through Dallas, killing one person. It was one of two tornadoes to touch down in Texas on January 20.
F4	St. Louis, Missouri	May 27, 1896	255+	See article on this tornado — A violent tornado inflicted heavy damage to downtown St. Louis, killing 255 or more and injuring a further 1,000 or more. Damage from the tornado totaled $10+ million (1896 USD).
F3	Indianapolis, Indiana	May 18, 1927	2	A tornado tracked through areas on the east side of Indianapolis, destroying multiple structures and killing 2.
F3	St. Louis, Missouri	September 29, 1927	72–79+	See section on this tornado — A high-end F3 tornado moved through East St. Louis, killing 72 or more, injuring 555 or more, and inflicting a total of $22 million (1927 USD) in damages to the city.
F3	Columbus, Ohio	May 2, 1929	2	1929 Rye Cove tornado outbreak — A tornado moved through central Columbus, destroying the Columbus Division of Police headquarters.
F3	Nashville, Tennessee	March 14, 1933	15	See section on this tornado — A tornado tracked across East Nashville, inflicting heavy damage to structures in the Donelson area. Damage costs from the tornado totaled an estimated $2.2 million (1933 USD).
F2	Charleston, South Carolina	September 29, 1938	27	A tornado hit downtown Charleston, damaging several buildings.
F5	Waco, Texas	May 11, 1953	114	See article on this tornado
F4	St. Louis, Missouri	February 10, 1959	21	St. Louis tornado outbreak of February 1959
F3	Galveston, Texas	September 21, 1961	0	Hurricane Carla tornado outbreak — Shortly after a comparable F4 tornado killed 8, an F3 tornado damaged commercial buildings in Galveston.
F5	Topeka, Kansas	June 8, 1966	17	See section on this tornado
F5	Lubbock, Texas	May 11, 1970	28	See article on this tornado
F3	Columbus, Ohio	May 10, 1973	0	
F2	Shreveport, Louisiana	April 17, 1978	0	
F4	Shreveport/Bossier City, Louisiana	December 3, 1978	2	1978 Bossier City tornado outbreak
F3	Kalamazoo, Michigan	May 13, 1980	5 (79 injured)	1980 Kalamazoo tornado
F0	South Bend, Indiana	May 31, 1991	0	A brief tornado touched down in the bounds of downtown South Bend, producing no damage.
F1	Houston, Texas	November 16, 1993	0 (26 injured)	
F3	Fort Smith, Arkansas	April 21, 1996	2 (≥40 injured)	Tornado outbreak sequence of April 1996#April 21 – An F3 tornado caused significant damage across Fort Smith's downtown, industrial, and residential areas.
F1	Miami, Florida	May 12, 1997	0	1997 Miami tornado
F3	Nashville, Tennessee	April 16, 1998	1	1998 Nashville tornado outbreak
F3	Little Rock, Arkansas	January 21, 1999	2	January 21–23, 1999 tornado outbreak § Little Rock, Arkansas tornadoes
F1	Hull, Quebec	May 8, 1999	0 (6 injured)	List of 1999 Oklahoma Tornado Outbreak tornadoes
F2	Salt Lake City, Utah	August 11, 1999	1	1999 Salt Lake City tornado
F1	Shreveport / Bossier City, Louisiana	April 23, 2000	0 (6 injured)	A tornado damaged windows, trees, and bus stops in downtown Shreveport and Bossier City. Damage estimated at 10 million dollars.
F3	Fort Worth, Texas	March 28, 2000	2	2000 Fort Worth tornado
F2	Guelph, Ontario	July 17, 2000	0	
F1	Springfield, Illinois	April 2, 2006	0	Damaged the office of the Illinois Department of Transportation.
F2	Iowa City, Iowa	April 13, 2006	0 (30 injured)	A high-end F2 damaged 1016 residential and 35 commercial buildings across Iowa City and the University of Iowa. Damage totals estimated at near 15 million dollars.
EF1	Des Moines, Iowa	October 2, 2007	0	Tornadoes of 2007 § October 2
EF2	Atlanta, Georgia	March 14, 2008	1	2008 Atlanta tornado outbreak
EF2	Shreveport, Louisiana	April 9, 2009	0	April 2009 tornado outbreak – A strong tornado damaged businesses, power lines, and trees in Shreveport, as well as causing significant damage to Barksdale Air Force Base.
EF2	Shreveport, Louisiana	October 29, 2009	0 (1 injured)	The second EF2 tornado to strike Shreveport in 2009 caused an estimated 1 million dollars in damage to downtown Shreveport and threw the steeple of the First United Methodist Church onto an occupied car, injuring the person inside.
EF0	Minneapolis, Minnesota	August 19, 2009	0	
EF2	Huntsville, Alabama	January 21, 2010	0	
EF3	Raleigh, North Carolina	April 16, 2011	6	Tornado outbreak of April 14–16, 2011
EF3	Springfield, Massachusetts	June 1, 2011	3 (200 injured)	2011 New England tornado outbreak
EF0	Tampa, Florida	February 26, 2013	0	
EF4	Garland / Rowlett, Texas	December 26, 2015	10	See article on this tornado
EF1	Davenport, Iowa	October 6, 2016	0	An EF1 tornado caused damage to the roofs of a homeless shelter and Scott County Jail, as well as widespread tree damage.
EF1	Shreveport / Bossier City, Louisiana	April 14, 2018	0	Tornado outbreak and blizzard of April 13–15, 2018 – An EF1 tornado caused an estimated 4 million dollars in damage across downtown Shreveport and Bossier City.
EF3	Gatineau, Quebec	September 21, 2018	0 (25 injured)	2018 Dunrobin-Gatineau EF3 – An intense, high-end EF3 tornado tracked through the National Capital Region of Canada, inflicting major damage to the town of Dunrobin, Ontario before crossing the Ottawa River into Quebec. There, at mid-EF3 intensity, it struck the heavily populated downtown area of Gatineau, ripping the roofs, walls, and top floors off of apartment buildings, as well as damaging several car dealerships.
EF4	Havana, Cuba	January 27, 2019	8	See article on this tornado – An intense tornado produced during the passage of a cold front produced a damage path about 18 km long through central Havana. The tornado caused 8 deaths and 190+ injuries along its path. The tornado was a strong EF4 with winds estimated at 185 mph.
EF2	San Angelo, Texas	May 18, 2019	0	Tornado outbreak of May 17–18, 2019
EF3	Nashville, Tennessee	March 3, 2020	5	See the article on this tornado – An intense tornado, 0.9 mi (1.4 km) wide at one point, caused severe damage to numerous structures along its path, particularly in eastern sections of Nashville. Numerous homes and large warehouse buildings were completely demolished, consistent with a high-end EF3 rating. Along its 60.13 mi (96.77 km) path, 5 people were killed and 220 others were injured. The tornado was spawned during an overnight outbreak across Middle Tennessee which collectively killed 24 people, injured 307 others, and resulted in $1.6 billion in damage.
EF0	Orlando, Florida	June 6, 2020	0	
EF1	Suffolk, Virginia	August 4, 2020	0	See the article on this tornado – An EF1 tornado, part of a larger tornado outbreak spawned by Hurricane Isaias, caused significant damage to at least eight buildings in downtown Suffolk. Numerous trees were snapped or uprooted along the path.
EF0	New Orleans, Louisiana	May 12, 2021	0	A weak tornado occurred in the Uptown area of New Orleans. It peeled back the roof of a large metal building before crossing the Mississippi River into Algiers. There, a few homes and businesses sustained minor roof damage. Trees and power lines were downed along the entire path of the tornado.
EF1	Arlington, Virginia/Washington, D.C.	July 1, 2021	0 (1 injured)	An EF1 tornado began in Arlington, snapping and uprooting numerous trees, including one that had its bark removed. Homes sustained exterior damage. The tornado crossed the Potomac River into the District of Columbia, causing tree damage at the National Mall and across Constitution Gardens. It mangled temporary fencing for an Independence Day celebration at The Mall before lifting. A second, brief tornado touched down east of the National Mall, causing additional damage to trees, some of which fell on cars.
EF1	Sarasota, Florida	March 16, 2022	0	The roof of an industrial building sustained significant damage.
EF1	Jackson, Mississippi	March 30, 2022	0 (1 injured)	See the article on this tornado – Homes sustained largely minor structural damage, except when downed trees inflicted additional damage.
EF1	Rockford, Illinois	March 31, 2023	0	See the article on this tornado – An EF1 tornado caused widespread damage to trees and intermittent damage to roofs as it moved through Rockford.
EF2	Hendersonville, Tennessee	December 9, 2023	3 (22 injuries)	See the article on this tornado – A strong tornado damaged over 200 buildings in Hendersonville alone. No fatalities were reported from Sumner County.
EF2	Tallahassee, Florida	May 10, 2024	0	See the article on this tornado – The northernmost of three tornadoes in Leon County, Florida, the tornado destroyed warehouses and caused significant tree damage across its 27.22 miles (43.81 km) path, being accompanied by significant straight-line winds to 100 mph (160 km/h), reaching a width of 0.5 miles (0.80 km) as it impacted downtown Tallahassee.
EF1	Lake Charles, Louisiana	May 13, 2024	0	A tornado caused minor damage to trees, power lines, and a business in downtown Lake Charles.
EF2	Rogers, Arkansas	May 26, 2024	0	See article on this tornado – A strong and very large tornado damaged hundreds of homes and businesses. Thousands of trees and many power poles were snapped or uprooted.
EF2	Port Arthur, Texas	April 10, 2024	0	A strong tornado severely damaged a church, a home had its roof completely removed and numerous other homes were damaged as the tornado moved offshore onto Sabine Lake.
EF1	Chicago, Illinois	July 15, 2024	0	See the article on this tornado — A tornado touched down just west of downtown and uprooted many trees. It then caused roof and fascia damage near the Chicago Police Academy, and weakened before dissipating next to the Presidential Towers.
EF1	Buffalo, New York	August 5, 2024	0	
EF0	Gary, Indiana	March 19, 2025	0	See the article on this tornado — Three weak tornadoes struck Gary, including an EF0 tornado that briefly went through the downtown area.
EF0	Town 'n' Country, Florida	May 24, 2026	0	A pool enclosure was damaged with a few other nearby structures being lightly damaged. A large tree was uprooted and small debris was lofted around.

== South America ==
South America has no default tornado strength measurement system, so the storms here are listed using the Fujita scale.

F#	Location	Date	Casualties	Notes
F3	Concepción, Chile	May 27, 1934	27 (599 injured)	A rare tornado razed downtown Concepción in 1934. Tornadoes in Chile are not common, and this is considered to be the deadliest on record.
FU	Santa Fe, Argentina	November 6, 1945	8 injuries	An unrated tornado damaged 15 homes and downing powerlines.
FU	Lages, Brazil	August 14, 1959	15 (unknown injuries)	Destructive tornado blew up roofs, destroyed houses and trees, and tossed vehicles. The tornado was never rated.
F1	Buenos Aires, Argentina	November 16, 1993	0	An F1 tornado hit the northern district of Villa Urquiza in north-eastern downtown Buenos Aires. Trees and a pavilion were damaged.
F3	Córdoba, Argentina	December 26, 2003	5 (90 injured)	Produced severe structural damage to homes and infrastructure, uprooted trees, and left large areas of the city without power. The tornado lasted for about 24 minutes, making it one of the longest-lasting tornadoes ever recorded in South America.
F2	Chivilcoy, Buenos Aires Province, Argentina	January 7, 2006	1 (9 injured)	
F1	Paraná, Argentina	March 17, 2006	0	An F1 tornado caused material damage within the city.
F3	Barranquilla, Colombia	September 15, 2006	0 (13 injured)	Damaging tornado that directly struck downtown, and was followed by severe flash flooding.
F1	Bogotá, Colombia	November 6, 2007	(1 injured)	Roofs were torn off buildings, including a car dealership. Windows were blown out and trees were uprooted.
FU	Paraná, Argentina	February 15, 2010	0	A tornado was reported within the city, causing no known damage.
F2	Los Ángeles, Chile	May 30, 2019	0 (43 injured)	Around 367 houses were damaged and a street pole was ripped out in this rare event.
F2	Concepción, Chile	May 31, 2019	1 (23 injured)	Several homes were damaged and some cars and trucks dumped. One person died in the city of Talcahuano.

== Europe ==
Note: The UK uses the TORRO scale. Tornadoes reported after August 2023 are listed on the IF scale, as the ESSL implemented it in their database in that month after its initial release on July 28, 2023

T#/F#	Location	Date	Casualties	Notes
T8/F4	London, England	October 23, 1091	2 fatalities, unknown amount of injuries	London tornado of 1091, destroyed London Bridge
F4	Vyšehrad (now Prague), Bohemia	July 30, 1119	Unknown	Vyšehrad tornado of 1119.
FU	Prague, Bohemia	May 14, 1144	Unknown	
F2	Kyiv, Ukraine	May 9, 1159	Unknown	An F2 tornado touched down in Kyiv.
F1	Prague, Bohemia	April 8, 1255	Unknown	
T7/F3	Valletta, Malta	September 23, 1551 (or 1556)	600	Valletta, Malta tornado
FU	Augsburg, Germany	July 2, 1587		
FU	Rome, Italy	December 4, 1645		
F3	Utrecht, Netherlands	August 1, 1674	Unknown	Damaged Dom Tower and Cathedral of St. Martin
F3	Rome, Italy	June 12, 1749	2	
F3	Padua, Italy	August 17, 1756	Unknown	Padua, 17th August Tornado. Heavy damage to the city; the leaded roof of the Palazzo della Ragione was thrown nearly 30km away
T8/F4	Portsmouth, England	December 14, 1810	Unknown	
T6/F3	Solingen, Germany	August 13, 1832	Unknown	Low-end F3 tornado
FU	Cologne, Germany	March 8, 1858	Unknown	A tornado struck Cologne along a 2 kilometer long path. The tornado was never rated.
F3	Frankfurt, Germany	Summer of 1860	Unknown	
FU	Brno, Moravia	October 13, 1870		(Then Austrian Empire, now Czech Republic.)
T4/F2	Vienna, Austria	June 29, 1873	Unknown	ESWD rated it F2. The severe storms killed many chickens.
FU	Berlin, Germany	November 3, 1876	Unknown	A damaging tornado was observed in Berlin. Windmills were picked up and thrown. Tornado was never rated.
F3	Madrid, Spain	May 12, 1886	45 dead	The most catastrophic and deadliest tornado in Spain in the past 200 years, but not the most powerful.
F0	Berlin, Germany	April 13, 1892	0	A tornado was observed in Berlin. No damage observed.
F2	Berlin, Germany	October 5, 1893	1 injured	ESWD mentions that an F2 tornado hit Berlin. 12-year-old boy injured. Planks carried about 50 meters. Roofs damaged or destroyed and trees were uprooted or snapped.
F2	Paris, France	September 10, 1896	5 dead	Tornado touched down in the heart of downtown Paris.
F0	Munich, Germany	May 27, 1897	0	
F4	Cologne, Germany	August 7, 1898	3	
FU	Tambov, Russia	June 2, 1902	2	Tornado struck Tambov, causing 2 fatalities. Tornado was never rated.
F4	Moscow, Russia	June 29, 1904	>100	1904 Moscow tornado. The destroyed areas are within the city limits today, but were suburbs in 1904.
FU	Cologne, Germany	August 14, 1906	Unknown	A tornado struck Cologne. The tornado was never rated.
FU	Berlin, Germany	July 25, 1909	Unknown	
FU	Nuremberg, Germany	July 22, 1910	Unknown	A long-track tornado was observed in Nuremberg, tracking 35 kilometers. The tornado was never rated.
F3	Chemnitz, Germany	May 27, 1916	0	
T5/F2	Düsseldorf, Germany	June 8, 1924	2	
F3	Nice, France	December 1, 1924	Unknown deaths, 30 injured	
IF1.5	Copenhagen, Denmark	November 24, 1927	0, 1 injury	A IF1.5 tornado took a 3.5 km-long (2.2 mi) path through downtown Copenhagen, causing moderate damage. Trees were snapped and uprooted, some of which were tossed. Buildings in downtown sustained heavy roof damage, with one being partially destroyed. Open windows were ripped out of homes and sheds were destroyed. As it hit a allotment area, a roof was torn off, which injured 1 woman. It is noted that it may have reached IF2 intensity.
FU	Berlin, Germany	July 4, 1928	0	A tornado struck Berlin along a 6 km-long (3.7 mi) path. Tornado was never rated.
F2	Salzburg, Austria	June 4, 1929	1 Fatality	A tornado struck Salzburg, resulting in 1 fatality, associated with a derecho. ESWD rated the tornado F2.
F4	Lublin, Poland	July 20, 1931	3 dead (1 in Lublin, 2 behind Lublin), a dozen injured	Lublin tornado of 1931
F4	Düsseldorf, Germany	January 10, 1936	2	
FU	Nuremberg, Germany	September 18, 1939	Unknown	A tornado was observed in Nuremberg. Tornado was never rated.
FU	Randers, Denmark	July 17, 1941	Unknown	No damage known.
T1/F0	Randers, Denmark	May 15, 1945	0	A tornado struck the dock area of Randers, lifting circus tents and tossing around benches.
F2	Hannover, Germany	September 15, 1950	0	
T3/F1	Oldenburg, Germany	May 16, 1953	0	A high-end F1 tornado touched down in Oldenburg.
T2/F1	Slough, United Kingdom	September 17, 1953	0	A low-end F1 tornado touched down in Slough.
F3	Castelo Branco, Portugal	November 6, 1954	5 dead, 220 injured	
F0	Magdeburg, Germany	July 25, 1955	0	
F1	Düsseldorf, Germany	October 6, 1955	Unknown	
F1	Szczecin, Poland	August 25, 1956	0	
F1	Perm, Russia	June 17, 1960	Unknown	
F1	Voronezh, Russia	August 14, 1961	Unknown	
FU	Minsk, Belarus	May 18, 1963	Unknown	Tornado reported in Minsk. The tornado was never rated.
F2	Esbjerg, Denmark	August 1, 1966	Unknown	ESWD mentions that a tornado destroyed roofs in Esbjerg.
F4	Padua and Venice, Italy	September 11, 1970	36	Struck the area between the Province of Padua and Venice Lagoon.
F3	Nizhny Novgorod, Russia	July 3, 1974	Unknown	
F1	Sanremo, Italy	January 20, 1981	5 injured	Tornado started as a waterspout, moving inland in Sanremo. Houses and vehicles damaged and trees were uprooted. Rated F1 by ESWD.
T3/F1	Wallasey, UK	November 23, 1981	0	1981 United Kingdom tornado outbreak
T2/F1	St Helens, UK	November 23, 1981	0	1981 United Kingdom tornado outbreak
T3/F1	Warrington, UK	November 23, 1981	0	1981 United Kingdom tornado outbreak. Tornado started over Croft, but then later hit Warrington. Traveled 6.8 miles.
T2/F1	Oldham, UK	November 23, 1981	0	1981 United Kingdom tornado outbreak. Tornado started in Hollinwood and traveled 3.1 miles, impacting Oldham.
T2/F1	Dudley, UK	November 23, 1981	0	1981 United Kingdom tornado outbreak
T1/F0	Luton, UK	November 23, 1981	0	1981 United Kingdom tornado outbreak
T1/F0	Norwich, UK	November 23, 1981	0	1981 United Kingdom tornado outbreak
T2/F1	Chelmsford, UK	November 23, 1981	0	1981 United Kingdom tornado outbreak
T3/F1	Berlin, Germany	May 16, 1983	0	A high-end F1 tornado was observed in Berlin.
F4	Ivanovo/Yaroslavl/Perm/Tver/Kostroma	June 9, 1984	More than 400 deaths in the outbreak	1984 Soviet Union tornado outbreak
F2	Oulu, Finland	August 11, 1985	Unknown	A waterspout made landfall in Oulu, causing F2 damage.
F2	Turku, Finland	July 21, 1988	Unknown	A tornado struck Turku, causing F2 damage.
F1	Copenhagen, Denmark	June 30, 1997	0	A tornado hit Copenhagen along a 0.7 km-long (0.43 mi) and 60-meter-wide (200 ft) path. Rated F1 by ESWD.
F2	Moscow, Russia	June 21, 1998	11 deaths, 200 injuries	An F2 tornado damaged over 2000 homes, damaged over 120,000 trees, and damaged cranes and vehicles.
F2	St Pölten, Austria	July 7, 1998	3 injuries	A tornado hit Pölten along a 5 km-long (3.1 mi) and 250-meter-wide (820 ft) path. ESWD gave the tornado an F2 rating.
FU	Sochi, Russia	September 24, 1998	Unknown	A tornado touched down in Sochi. The tornado was never rated.
F1	Saransk, Russia	April 26, 1999	0	A tornado went through Saransk along a 0.5 km-long (0.31 mi) and 10-meter-wide (33 ft) path. Two cars were moved. ESWD rated it F1.
F2	Monza, Italy	15 April 2000		Monza-Villasanta tornado of 2000.
F1	Copenhagen, Denmark	June 11, 2004	0	Tornado over Copenhagen, tracking 1 kilometer. Rated F1 by ESWD.
F1	Randers, Denmark	July 3, 2004	0	Tornado damaged homes across a 2 km-long (1.2 mi) path in Randers. Rated F1 by ESWD.
F2	Duisburg, Oberhausen, Germany	July 18, 2004	6 injured	
F1	Oslo, Norway	October 22, 2004	0	F1 Tornado hit the dock area of Oslo, causing moderate damage. Trees were downed, cars were moved & a street sign was bent 35 degrees.
FU	Växjö, Sweden	July 15, 2005	Unknown	A tornado hit Växjö. The tornado was never rated.
F1	Halmstad, Sweden	July 16, 2005	Unknown	An F1 tornado hit Halmstad.
FU	Helsinki, Finland	August 28, 2005	0 killed, 7 injured	A tornado hit Helsinki, causing 7 injuries. The tornado was never rated.
F2	Hamburg, Germany	March 27, 2006	2 killed, ≥2 injured	A tornado hit Hamburg, killing 2 crane operators and injuring at least two people.
T4/F2	Nuremberg, Germany	August 28, 2006	0	A tornado was observed in Nuremberg, tracking 1.7 kilometers with a max width of 250 meters. Roofs and chimneys were damaged, some of which were severely damaged. 10 – 15-meter-tall (49 ft) trees were snapped.
F2	Frankfurt, Hesse, Germany	June 25, 2007	Unknown	Oberrad tornado of 2007
F1	Helsingborg, Sweden	August 16, 2007	Unknown	An F1 tornado hit Helsingborg.
F2	Ålborg, Denmark	August 10, 2009	Unknown	southern part of downtown Ålborg was hit by an F2/IF2 tornado that tracked 6.6 km. Roofs sustained high-end F1/IF1 damage with some buildings being partly deroofed. Trees were uprooted or snapped, including A healthy hardwood tree that was snapped at F2/IF2 intensity.
T4/F2	Málaga, Spain	February 1, 2009	0	Málaga tornado of 2009
F1	Kolpino, Russia	July 9, 2010		
F3	Blagoveshchensk, Russia	July 31, 2011	1 killed, 38 injured	Blagoveshchensk tornado
T2/F1	Chorzów, Poland	August 21, 2016	0	Chorzów – Siemianowice Śląskie tornado
T2/F1	Amsterdam, Netherlands	August 9, 2019	0	A waterspout hit land and caused damage in Amsterdam's Centrum.
F2	Kropyvnytskyi, Ukraine	October 17, 2020	3 injuries	A tornado caused damage in Kropyvnytskyi. More than 100 roofs were damaged, lots of them badly, occasionally walls collapsed or were badly damaged, dozens of trees were snapped, debranched or uprooted. 3 people sustained injuries.
F1	Barking, UK	June 25, 2021	0	A tornado caused moderate damage in Barking.
F1	Kiel, Germany	September 29, 2021	7 injuries	A long-track tornado hit Kiel. Started in Meimersdorf, moving through Kiel across a 14.5 km-long (9.0 mi) and 70-meter-wide (230 ft) path. It ended near Dorf (Kiel). Roofs were severely damaged by this tornado. A supercell waterspout was also spawned in parallel to the main tornado as it was crossing the rivers near Kiel's dock. The tornado remained on the ground for 31 minutes. Several people were injured when they were thrown into the water.
F1	Mechelen, Belgium	October 12, 2021	0	A brief F1 tornado partly blew off the roof of a garage & damaged another apartment.
F0	Anapa, Russia	January 29, 2022	0	ESWD mentions that a tornado started as a waterspout, moving inland in Anapa. Roofs were damaged.
T1/F0	Sandnes, Norway	February 6, 2022	0	A brief high-end F0/T1 tornado hit Sandnes. Roof tiles ripped off, sheds blown away, fencing downed & a tree was uprooted. The tornado tracked 0.1 km, reaching a max width of 30 meters.
F2	Lippstadt, Germany	May 20, 2022	0	A large wedge tornado hit Lippstadt, associated with a cyclic supercell that produced several tornadoes. Considerable damage occurred during this tornado's 13.4 km-long (8.3 mi) path. Roofs were damaged or partly deroofed. Roof tiles were stripped off homes. One Farm sustained heavy deroofing. A church had its wooden tower demolished. Trees lost large branches and were uprooted or snapped, some of which landed on vehicles. Some trees sustained debranching as well. No injuries were reported.
F2	Paderborn, Germany	May 20, 2022	43 injuries	A tornado, associated with a cyclic supercell that produced several tornadoes, caused considerable damage to buildings, trees, and vehicles in Paderborn, leaving 43 injured along its 21.5 km-long (13.4 mi) path. Roofs were severely damaged or destroyed, including a church that saw severe roof tile loss. A factory had its steel roof structure severely destroyed and peeled back. A building had its garage port blown in. Windows were broken and debris was impaled into buildings, vehicles, and objects, including a Ford Transit Connect van that saw significant damage to the trunk when it was impaled by debris. Trees lost large branches and were uprooted, snapped, or twisted, some landing on vehicles. Several cars, trucks & caravans were overturned, flipped, or destroyed.
FU	Sergiyev Posad, Russia	July 18, 2023	0	A weak tornado hit Sergiyev Posad, but was never rated.
FU	Mahilyow, Belarus	July 27, 2023	0	A tornado hit Mahilyow, but was never rated.
IFU	Salerno, Italy	November 21, 2023	0	A waterspout made landfall in Salerno. The tornado was never rated.
IFU	Genoa, Italy	November 29, 2023	0	A waterspout made landfall in the port area of downtown Genoa. The tornado was never rated.
IFU	Rhodes, Greece	February 12, 2024	0	A waterspout made landfall in the port area at downtown Rhodes, causing damage to ships & downing trees. The tornado has not yet been rated
IF1	Rhodes, Greece	April 1, 2025	0	Amid strong storms and severe weather in Southern Europe, an IF1 tornado hit downtown Rhodes, damaging buildings, trees, and cars.
IF1	Gronau, Germany	June 4, 2026	0	A tornado hit Gronau, causing IF1 damage in the town. It started in Glanerbrug, Netherlands where it caused IF1.5 damage before crossing the border between Germany and the Netherlands.

== Africa ==
Africa has no default tornado strength measurement system, so the storms here will be listed using the Fujita Scale.

F#	Location	Date	Casualties	Notes
F4	Roodepoort, South Africa	November 26, 1948	4 (Note: Death toll related to the parent supercell.)	The parent cell produced 15 known tornadoes, wrecked 700 homes, and caused an estimated R150,000,000 in damage.
F?	Albertynesville, South Africa	November 30, 1952	20	Albertynesville, South Africa Tornado
F2	Paynesville, South Africa	December 2, 1952	11	Paynesville, South Africa Tornado
F3	Mtata, South Africa	December 15, 1998	15	Mtata, South Africa Tornado
F3	Klerksdorp, South Africa	March 3, 2007	1	Klerksdorp, South Africa Tornado
F4	Duduza/East Rand, South Africa	October 2, 2011	2	East Rand – Duduza, South Africa Tornado

== Asia ==
Most of Asia has no default tornado strength measurement system (though Japan has been known to use the Fujita Scale in the past), so the storms here are listed using the Fujita Scale.

F#/EF#	Location	Date	Casualties	Notes
F?	Miyazaki, Miyazaki Prefecture, Japan	September 26, 1881	16 deaths	Miyazaki Tornado of 1881
F?	Dhaka, Bangladesh	April 7, 1888	184 dead, 1200 injured	
F?	Yodobashi City, Shinjuku, Tokyo, Japan	September 23, 1903	10, 14 injured	
F?	Toyohashi City, Aichi Prefecture, Japan	November 28, 1941	12 dead, 177 injured, 347 homes destroyed	
F4	Shanghai, China	September 24, 1956	68 deaths, hundreds injured	A typhoon-related event
F?	Tomiye City, Nagasaki Prefecture, Japan	November 10, 1957	8	
F?	Tokyo, Japan	May 24, 1964	480 homes damaged	
F4	Yancheng, China	March 3, 1966	87 deaths, 1246 injured	Lifted a transfomer of tons to the other side of a big river and severely damaged a concrete factory
F4+	Bazhou and Tianjin, China	August 29, 1969	>94 deaths, hundreds injured	This tornado first caused high casualties in several villages before entering downtown Tianjin with near peak intensity. Concrete factories were severely damaged and some leveled.
F3+	Hulan, China	July 3, 1987	1 dead, 161 injured	Hulan, Heilongjiang Tornado
F?	New Delhi, India	March 17–18, 1978	28 dead, 700 injured	New Delhi Tornado
F3	Dalatpur Upazila, Manikganj/Saturia, Bangladesh	April 26, 1989	1300+	Daulatpur-Saturia Tornado
F3	Mobara, Chiba, Chiba Prefecture, Japan	December 11, 1990	0, 78 injured, 1000 homes damaged	Mobara Tornado
F?	Shanghai, People's Republic of China	August 11, 1995	4	
F?	Dhaka Division, Bangladesh	May 13, 1996	700+	
F3	Toyohashi City, Aichi Prefecture, Japan	September 24, 1999	4	Toyohashi City, Japan Tornadoes
F?	Tokyo, Japan	September 12, 2000	0, several homes damaged	
F3	Nobeoka, Miyazaki Prefecture on Kyūshū, Japan	September 18, 2006	3	Nobeoka, Miyazaki Tornado
EF3	Longgang, China	August 18, 2007	11 dead, 60+ injured	Related to Typhoon Sepat
EF3+	Lingbi County, Anhui, People's Republic of China	June 20, 2008	1	Lingbi, Anhui Tornado
EF1	New Taipei, Taiwan	May 12, 2011	0 known, some light damage	Xindian District, New Taipei city Tornado
EF1	New Manila, Quezon City, Philippines	June 24, 2011	At least 1 injured, >30 homes damaged	New Manila Tornado
F3	Tsukuba and Jōsō, Ibaraki Prefecture, Japan	May 6, 2012	1 dead, 30 injured, 345 homes damaged	Tsukuba and Jōsō, Ibaraki Tornado
F2	Koshigaya, Saitama Prefecture, Japan	September 2, 2013	63 injured,89 homes damaged	Koshigaya, Saitama Tornado
EF2	Mandaue and Lapu-Lapu City, Philippines	November 4, 2013	13 injured, more than 20 homes damaged	Tropical Depression Wilma
EF1	Cebu City, Philippines	April 8, 2014	1 injured, more than 20 homes damaged	Cebu City Tornado
EF4+	Yancheng, Jiangsu, People's Republic of China	June 23, 2016	99 dead, 846 injured	Jiangsu tornado
EF1	Manila and Quezon City, Philippines	August 14, 2016	1 injured	Manila tornado
EF1	Marikina, Philippines	September 14, 2018	2 injured	Typhoon Mangkhut
EF4	Kaiyuan, China	July 3, 2019	7 deaths, 190 injured	Kaiyuan, Liaoning Tornado
EF1	Yingkou, China	August 16, 2019		Yingkou, Liaoning Tornado
EF2	Danzhou, China	August 29, 2019	8 dead, 8 injured	Related to Tropical Storm Podul
EF2	Guangzhou, China	June 16, 2022	0	Tornadoes of 2022#June 16 (China)

== Notable omissions ==
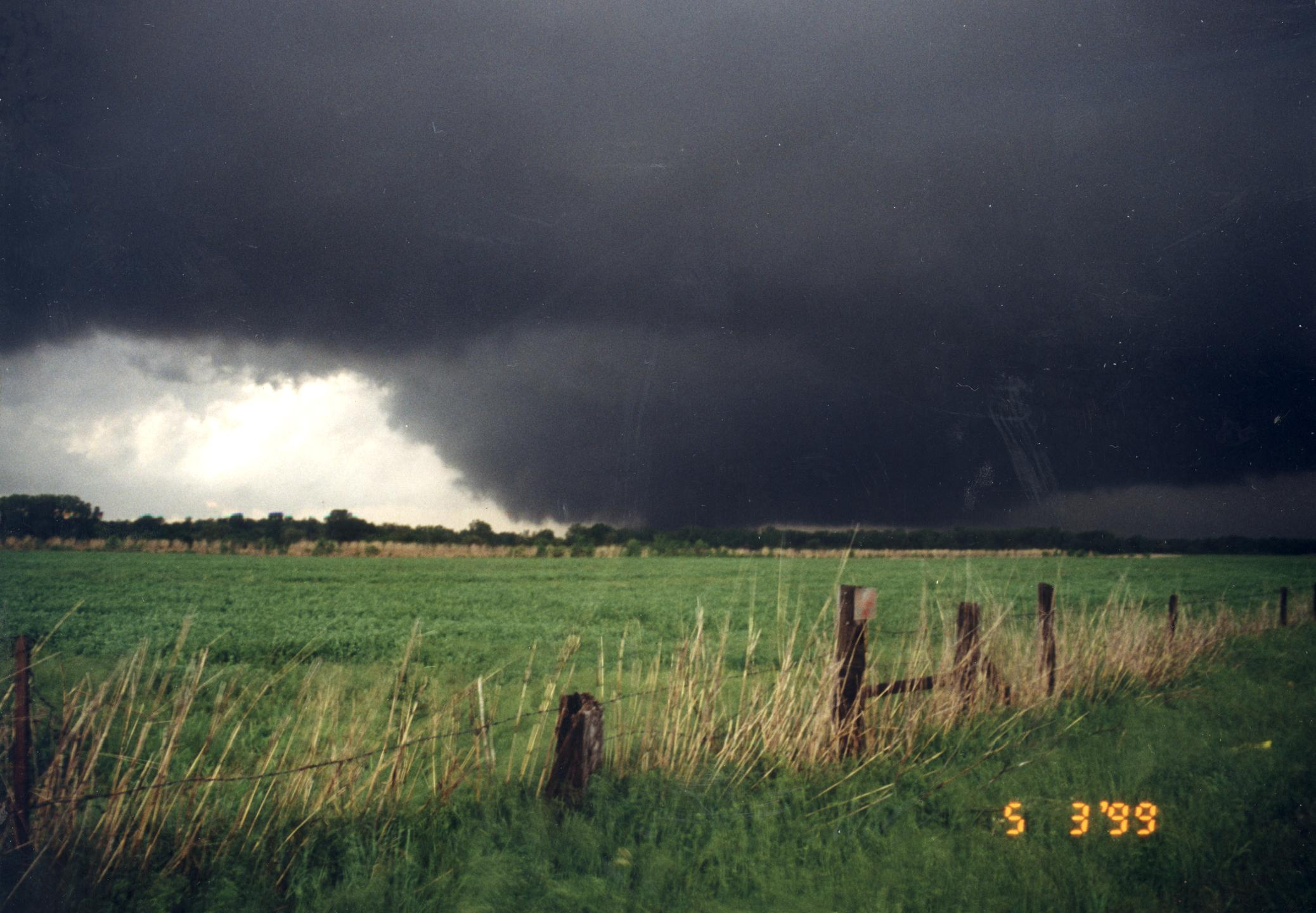
1999 Bridge Creek-Moore F5 tornado.

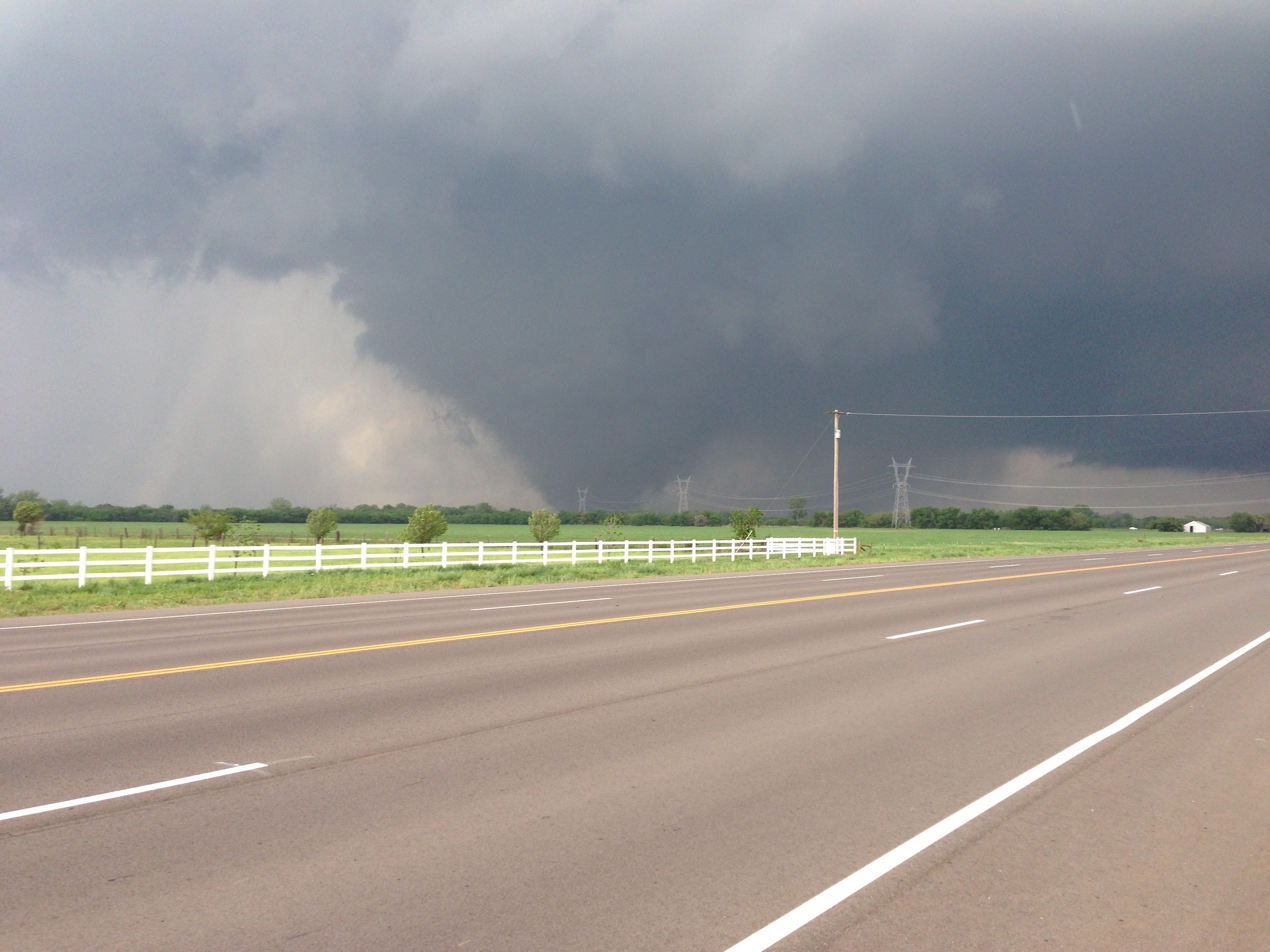
2013 Moore EF5 tornado, notably the last EF/F5 tornado until 2025.

The 1999 Oklahoma tornado outbreak that spawned the deadly F5 tornado which struck Oklahoma City and some of its suburbs, including Moore and Midwest City, is not listed because it did not reach the downtown core of Oklahoma City. The 2013 Moore tornado is also not included for the same reason.

The downtown areas of two then-small towns (now large cities) in North Carolina were struck during the 1884 Enigma outbreak: Concord and Cary. Downtown Concord was struck a second time by a tornado in May 1936.

The 1987 Edmonton Tornado is not listed because it struck industrial parks, trailer parks, and suburban areas, and was far away from Edmonton's downtown core. The "Oak Lawn tornado" of April 21, 1967 which killed 33 people, mostly those in rush hour traffic at a busy intersection, and moved across southern Chicago onto Lake Michigan is not included because it missed the downtown core. Most recently, the 2008 Memphis tornado on February 5, 2008, also missed the downtown area (by a significant distance).

The Flint–Worcester tornado outbreak sequence in 1953 produced several tornadoes that struck metropolitan areas. However, none of the tornadoes hit downtown areas, moving through areas just north or west of the city cores. Therefore, these tornadoes are not included.

Tornado-warned supercells have moved into cities, including Toronto in August 2005 and Chicago in July 2023, however only storms that produced confirmed tornadoes in downtown city centers are included.

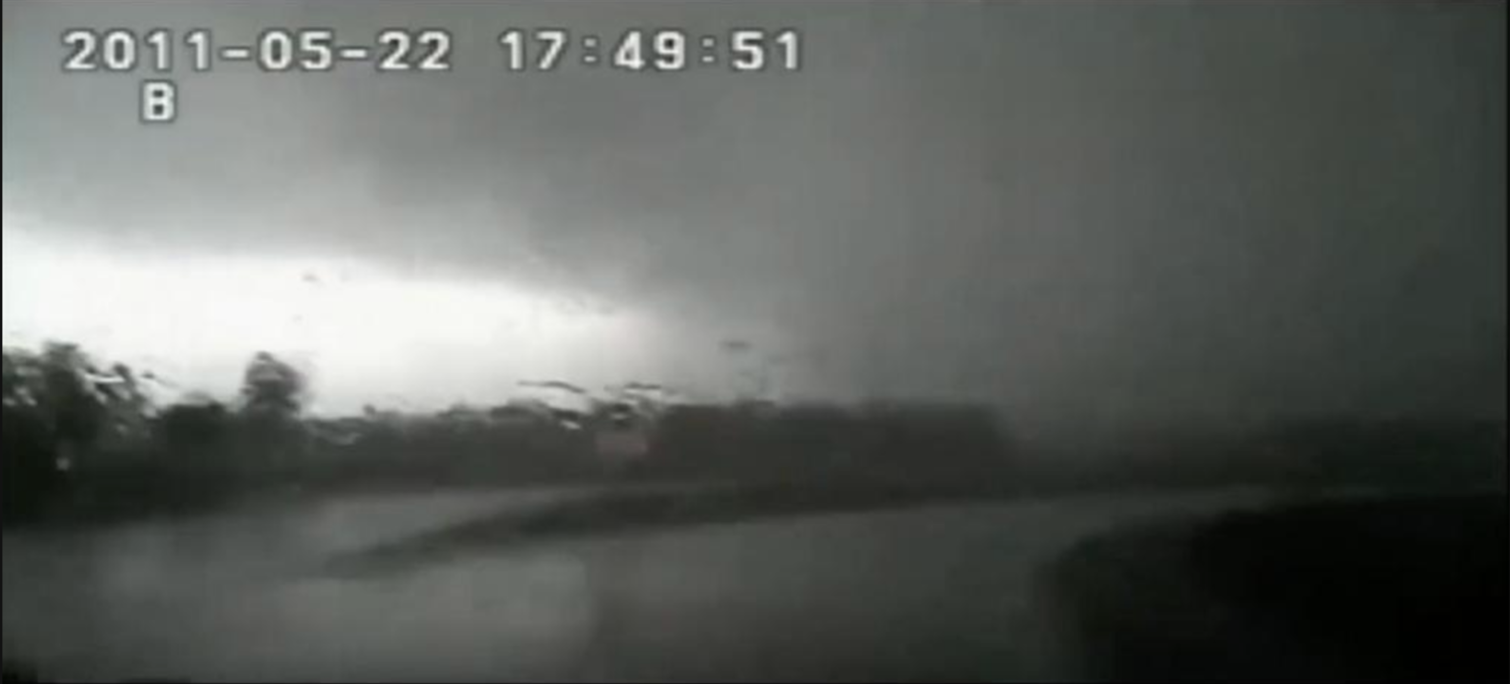
2011 Joplin Missouri EF5 as taken from a dash cam.

The devastating and violent EF5 tornado that hit Joplin, Missouri in 2011 is not listed as the tornado did not impact downtown, instead impacting residential areas in the south of the city. The F3 tornado that affected Joplin on May 5, 1971, is not included as the population was below 50,000.

Another notable absence is the July 7, 1915 storm that struck Cincinnati, killing 38 people. This was determined to be most likely a windstorm causing downbursts or even a series of microbursts (with much of the damage coming from the straight-line winds), and not a tornado.

European tornadoes that are listed before 1950 are for cities that had at least 50,000 people in them at the time. Tornadoes dating back to 1054 are confirmed, due to extensive record-keeping for many weather events and other until-then unexplained weather occurrences.

On September 8, 2010, Tropical Storm Hermine went over the state of Texas and produced a few tornadoes in the Dallas–Fort Worth metroplex. One notable tornado was located in an industrialized area west of downtown Dallas before it lifted up over Interstate 35E just south of Dallas Love Field. However, the EF2 tornado was about 3–4 mi (4.8–6.4 km) away and did not strike the immediate downtown Dallas area. Similarly, the 1957 Dallas tornado hit areas northwest and north and downtown, missing the core of the city. The May 26, 1976 and October 20, 2019, Dallas tornadoes were also not listed for the same reasons (striking the northern Dallas neighborhoods in an almost identical track between each other).

The city of Auckland in New Zealand has experienced multiple fatal tornadoes in its history, including one in 2012 which killed 3 people. However, none of these tornadoes have reached the downtown district of the city.

The July 2024 Midwest derecho produced multiple tornadoes impacting large cities, including Des Moines, Iowa, Davenport, Iowa, Peoria, Illinois, Joliet, Illinois, and Chicago, Illinois; none of the tornadoes reached a downtown area.

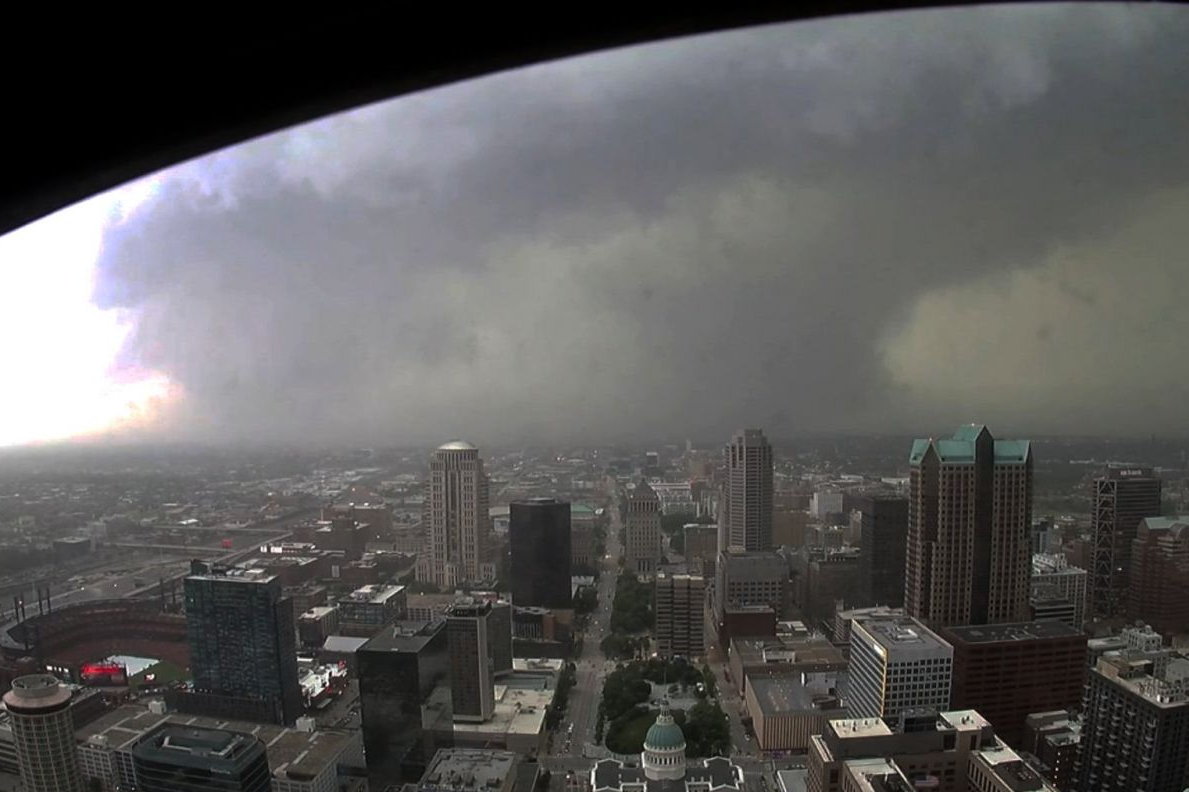
2025 EF3 tornado hitting St. Louis suburbs.

On May 16, 2025 an EF3 tornado with estimated winds of 152 miles per hour hit the city of St Louis however it did not hit the direct downtown urban area and went through Forest Park and St Louis suburbs therefore it is not included on this list.

Tornadoes that have struck cities that fell short of 50,000 at their previous census include Hattiesburg, Mississippi's 2013 EF4, Fort Smith, Arkansas's 1898 F4, Portage, Michigan's 2024 EF2, Newnan, Georgia's 2021 EF4, and Barrie, Ontario's 1985 F4. The city of Rome, New York was hit by an EF2 tornado in July 2024; it is not included as the city's population, which exceeded 50,000 in the past, had a 2020 population of under 40,000. Athens, Alabama was hit by a High end EF1 tornado that stripped several roofs off of businesses in the Limestone County Court Square. Athens was not included as it only had about 31,000 people in the 2023 census estimates, although it is the 2nd largest suburb in the Huntsville metropolitan area after Madison.

== See also ==
- List of places hit multiple times by significant tornadoes
- List of tornadoes and tornado outbreaks
  - List of European tornadoes and tornado outbreaks
  - List of North American tornadoes and tornado outbreaks
    - List of Canadian tornadoes
  - List of Southern Hemisphere tornadoes and tornado outbreaks
- List of F5 and EF5 tornadoes
- List of F4 and EF4 tornadoes
  - List of F4 and EF4 tornadoes (2010–2019)
  - List of F4 and EF4 tornadoes (2020–present)
- Urban climate and climatology
