= 2020 Nashville tornado =

2020 tornado in Tennessee, US

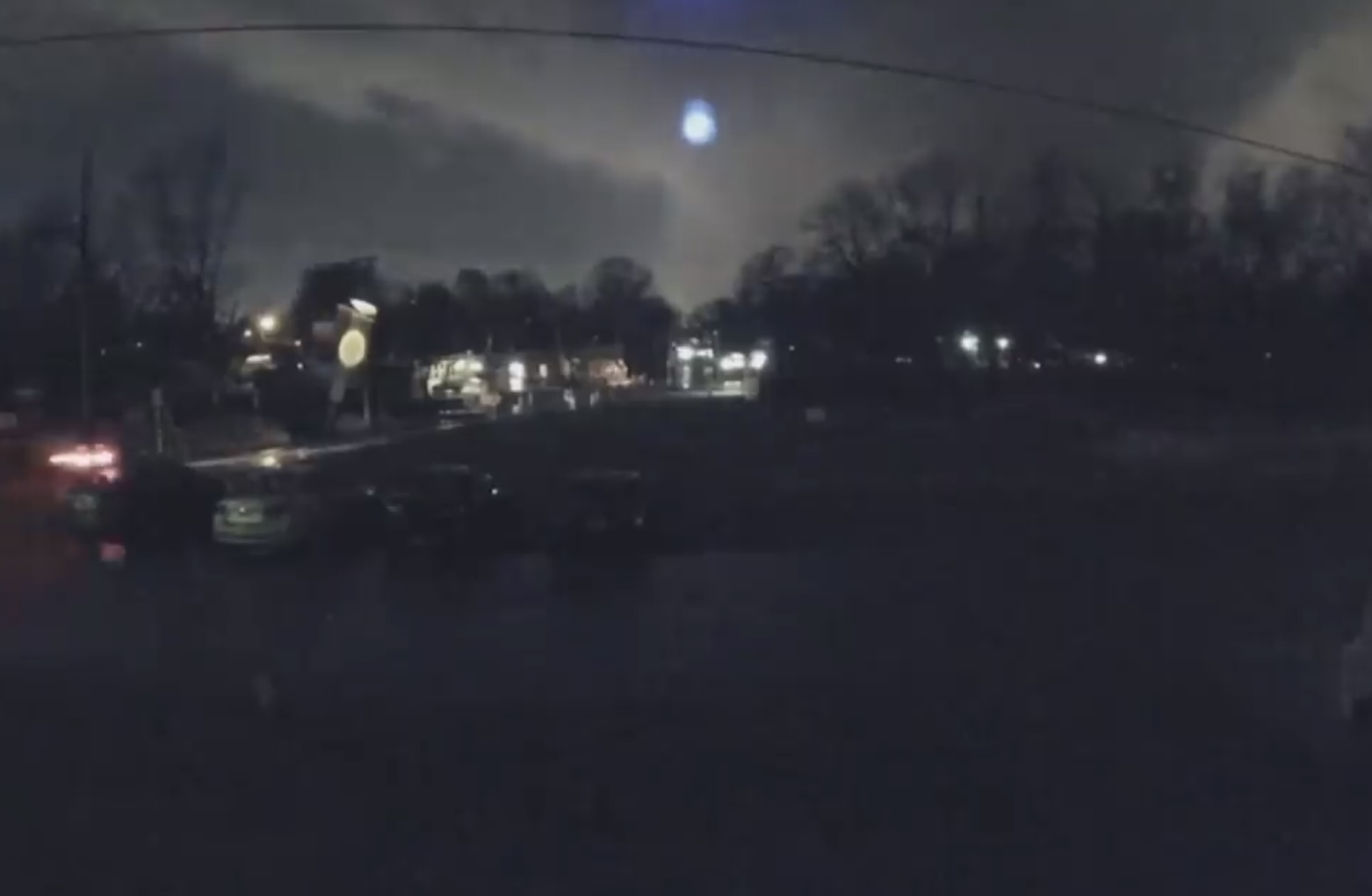
- A CCTV still of the tornado in downtown Nashville as it was producing EF2-rated damage to structures.

Meteorological history
- Formed: March 3, 2020, 12:32 a.m. CST (UTC−06:00)
- Dissipated: March 3, 2020, 1:35 a.m. CST (UTC−06:00)
- Duration: 1 hour, 3 minutes

EF3 tornado
- on the Enhanced Fujita scale
- Highest winds: 165 mph (266 km/h)

Overall effects
- Fatalities: 5
- Injuries: 220
- Damage: $1.504 billion (2020 USD) (8th costliest tornado in US history)
- Part of the 2020 Nashville tornado outbreak and Tornadoes of 2020

In the early morning hours of March 3, 2020, a large and destructive EF3-rated tornado moved through downtown Nashville, located in the state of Tennessee. The tornado killed five people along its 60-mile (97 km) track; it was on the ground for just over an hour. The tornado heavily damaged portions of Nashville, inflicting damages that would later total in excess of $1 billion (2020 USD), making it the eighth-costliest tornado in United States history. The tornado was part of a larger outbreak of severe weather that produced fifteen tornadoes across the southern United States, including the Cookeville EF4 tornado that was spawned from the same supercell as the Nashville tornado.

The tornado touched down near Pegram at 12:32 a.m., slowly strengthening as it entered the Nashville metropolitan area. It reached high-end EF2 strength near the John C. Tune Airport, where helicopters were damaged and aircraft hangars were destroyed. The tornado heavily damaged the nearby Tennessee State Prison and shortly later struck the campus of the Tennessee State University. Two people were killed when the tornado barreled through the Germantown area, reaching EF3 intensity as it moved to the east. The tornado continued to produce heavy damage to homes and businesses as it neared and later hit areas near Mount Juliet, where three more people were killed by the tornado. It lifted a short time later. It was the first intense tornado to move through downtown Nashville since the 1998 Nashville F3 tornado.

== Meteorological synopsis ==
The threat for severe weather across Middle Tennessee and surrounding areas was not forecast well in advance. The Storm Prediction Center (SPC) first issued a slight risk across northeastern Arkansas into the Tennessee Valley area in their 1:00 a.m. CST (06:00 UTC) March 2 outlook. In their forecast, the SPC noted that an unstable atmosphere was likely to materialize ahead of an approaching cold front, but that this environment would likely be contained by a capping inversion for most of the day.

By 11:00 p.m. CST, as a surface low progressed northeastward through southern Missouri, sustained barometric pressure falls caused supercell storms to give way to an organized storm cluster that gradually weakened as it progressed into an area of less abundant moisture. As convection weakened to the north, the SPC began to monitor areas farther south – encompassing eastern Arkansas, West Tennessee, and southwestern Kentucky – for reinvigorated thunderstorm development as the northern jet stream amplified southeastward into the risk area. Strong wind shear coupled with low instability was expected to promote activity with "a risk for severe hail, strong surface gusts and perhaps potential for a tornado or two." At 11:20 p.m. CST, a localized tornado watch was issued across Middle Tennessee.

== Tornado summary ==
The tornado first touched down around 12:32 a.m. CST (06:32 UTC) in western Davidson County along SR 251, 7 miles (11 km) northeast of Pegram. Initially, just trees were downed as the tornado crossed the Cumberland River and moved through Bells Bend, where a barn was also destroyed. Damage along this initial segment of the path was rated EF0 to EF1. The tornado crossed the river a second time before heavily damaging the John C. Tune Airport and an industrial area along Centennial Boulevard, including a terminal and the headquarters of Western Express, Inc. at high-end EF2 strength. The airport sustained significant damage to its terminal and other buildings, with 17 metal hangars on the property destroyed. More than 90 aircraft parked at the airport, including charter jets, smaller airplanes, and a news helicopter operated by CBS affiliate WTVF were destroyed. Maintaining high-end EF2 strength, it crossed SR 155 and struck the former Tennessee State Prison, which sustained considerable structural damage. A communications tower and metal truss transmission towers were downed nearby. The tornado crossed the Cumberland River a third time and traveled through river bottomland in the Bordeaux neighborhood, snapping trees, producing roof damage to a few homes and the Bordeaux nursing home, and destroying a few small sheds and outbuildings. It then crossed the river again and struck the northern part of the Tennessee State University campus at EF2 intensity.

Agricultural buildings on the campus were heavily damaged, resulting in the deaths of two calves and injuries to several goats. East of this location, the tornado produced EF1 to EF2 damage in the North Nashville neighborhood, mainly to numerous homes and a few businesses. Some small homes sustained roof and exterior wall loss in this area, and many trees and power lines were downed.

Track and intensity map of the tornado through Germantown and points north of downtown Nashville. (Note: The triangles indicate the level of damage at a specific point along the tornado's track.) Key EF0 65–85 mph EF1 86–110 mph EF2 111–135 mph EF3 136–165 mph

The tornado grew to nearly two-thirds of a mile (1.1 km) wide as it crossed I-65 and moved into Germantown, just north of the Tennessee State Capitol, where it produced a widespread swath of mid to high-end EF2 damage. Throughout Germantown, numerous homes, churches, and apartment buildings sustained significant structural damage, including several large, multi-story apartment buildings that had their roofs and upper-floor exterior walls ripped off. An O'Reilly Auto Parts store was damaged and an AutoZone was almost completely destroyed. The Tennessee Department of Human Services building was largely destroyed, with its roof ripped off and some exterior walls collapsed. Around this time, local news media in Nashville began reporting power flashes and showing numerous videos of the tornado as it moved through the area, including WTVF, whose studio facility—located along James Robertson Parkway between Germantown and the State Capitol—narrowly missed a direct hit by the tornado. This section of the track was similar to the path of the F3 tornado that struck parts of Downtown Nashville on April 16, 1998, which also narrowly missed the WTVF building. After crossing the Cumberland River for the fifth time along the Jefferson Street Bridge, the tornado struck Topgolf and an industrial area, causing damage at EF1 to EF2 intensity. A U-Haul store was destroyed, with numerous moving trucks flipped and tossed.

It then crossed I-24 at Spring Street and produced major EF3-strength damage in East Nashville, crossing the path of the April 16, 1998, F3 tornado in the Five Points neighborhood. Numerous businesses, restaurants, bars, homes, and apartment buildings were damaged or destroyed in Five Points, including Basement East, a popular music venue, which sustained major structural damage. A YMCA was badly damaged, and a Dollar General store was completely destroyed. Two fatalities occurred in Five Points when two pedestrians were struck by debris on McFerrin Avenue. The tornado continued through neighborhoods east of Five Points, causing EF2 damage to numerous homes, churches, and multi-story brick buildings. Some of these structures had removal of roofs and collapse of exterior walls. The damage continued at EF1 to EF2 strength back across the river and across Briley Parkway into the Lincoya Hills neighborhood, where many homes were damaged in this residential area. Numerous houses sustained minor to moderate damage along this segment of the path, though a few homes were significantly damaged. The tornado then moved into Donelson, crossing the Stones River twice and destroying much of Donelson Christian Academy and the Stanford Estates subdivision as it rapidly re-intensified.

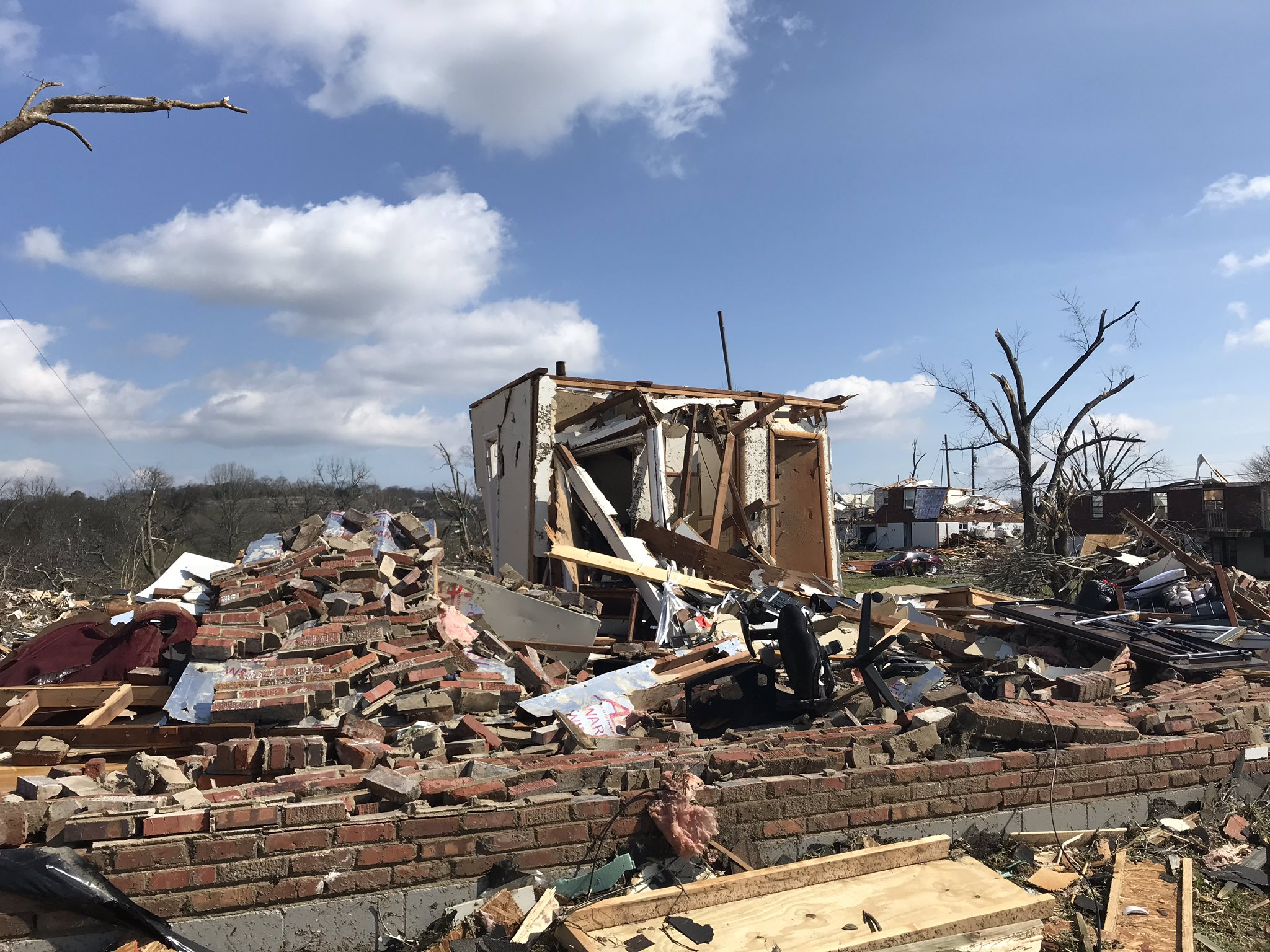
EF3 damage in downtown Nashville

Numerous homes at Stanford Estates were destroyed and vehicles were thrown and mangled, and a few homes in this subdivision were leveled at high-end EF3 strength. The tornado crossed US 70 and then the Stones River a third time and continued into the southern part of Hermitage at high-end EF2 intensity. Numerous homes and industrial buildings sustained severe damage in Hermitage, along with Dodson Chapel United Methodist Church, in the area of SR 265, SR 45, and Tulip Grove Road. Kroger, Panera Bread, and Petco, in addition to multiple apartment buildings, sustained considerable damage along SR 45. The tornado maintained EF2 strength as it paralleled I-40 into Wilson County.

The tornado moved through Mount Juliet, producing a large swath of high-end EF3 damage as it crossed North Mount Juliet Road and substantially damaged Mount Juliet Christian Academy, West Wilson Middle School, and Stoner Creek Elementary. Numerous homes throughout town were heavily damaged or destroyed, a few of which were completely leveled. Two fatalities occurred in western Mount Juliet along Catalpa Drive. Maintaining EF3 intensity along a six-mile (9.7 km) swath, the tornado continued east of Mount Juliet along the north side of I-40 towards Lebanon, causing severe damage in residential, commercial, and industrial areas between the two cities.

Numerous large warehouses, industrial buildings, and manufacturing facilities were destroyed in this area, and many semi-truck trailers were thrown and destroyed. A fifth fatality occurred in a CEVA Logistics warehouse near Beckwith Road and Volunteer Drive. While on the interstate in this area, around six tractor-trailers were blown from the eastbound lanes into the westbound lanes, resulting in the interstate being closed for around 12 hours. Further east, a sixth person was killed in a building along Eastgate Boulevard, although it was never confirmed if this death was directly related to the tornado.

The last area of EF3-strength damage was observed to warehouses along Eastgate Boulevard before the tornado weakened to EF2 intensity, producing more damage across SR 109 and along Leeville Pike and Tuckers Gap Road. Extensive tree damage occurred in this area, and multiple well-built homes had their roofs ripped off, a few of which had some exterior walls collapse. Two metal truss electrical transmission towers were blown over near Tuckers Gap Road before the tornado weakened to high-end EF1 strength and entered Lebanon. In Lebanon, many homes and businesses suffered considerable damage, including two large cemeteries, Lebanon Municipal Airport, Walmart, and Lowe's, as the tornado crossed South Hartmann Drive, South Maple Street, and US 231. The Wilson County Fairgrounds was affected as the tornado crossed US 70 and moved east out of town. Frame homes were damaged, and some mobile homes and outbuildings were destroyed in this area. It continued along the interstate between Lebanon and Tuckers Crossroads, causing damage on both sides of the interstate along Bluebird Road and Coe Lane. As the tornado passed Linwood Road, a gas station and a heavy equipment auctioneer's property sustained low-end EF2 damage. The gas station had a canopy blown over and a couple exterior walls knocked down.

Track and intensity map of the tornado through New Middleton and its dissipation a short time later. Key EF0 65–85 mph EF1 86–110 mph

Continuing into Smith County, the tornado produced EF1-type damage in the Grant and New Middleton communities, snapping and uprooting many trees, damaging or destroying barns and outbuildings, and causing considerable roof damage to homes. The tornado dipped south of the interstate at New Middleton, continuing to damage houses and destroy outbuildings as it crossed ridges and valleys through southern Gordonsville, with most of the damage occurring on Agee Branch Road, Hickman Highway, and Maple Street. A couple of mobile homes were damaged or destroyed in the Gordonsville area as well, including one that was flipped on top of a truck on Hickman Highway, and damage in this area was rated high-end EF1. More tree and structural damage was observed as the tornado left Gordonsville at EF1 intensity before it lifted east-northeast of Hickman along SR 141 at 1:35 a.m. CST (07:35 UTC).

== Aftermath ==
=== Casualties ===
The tornado killed five people; two in Nashville and three in the Mount Juliet area.

Confirmed fatalities from the Nashville tornado
Name	Age	Location of death	City
Michael Dolfini	36	McFerrin Avenue	Nashville
Albree Sexton	33	McFerrin Avenue	Nashville
Brandy Barker	38	Athlete's Way	Mount Juliet
James Eaton	84	Catalpa Drive	Mount Juliet
Donna Eaton	81	Catalpa Drive	Mount Juliet

=== Recovery efforts ===
$10.8 million (2020 USD) in federal funding was available to victims of the tornado by the United States Department of Housing and Urban Development. Disaster Recovery Connection helped 518 victims of the tornado in Davidson County.

=== Nashville damage survey ===
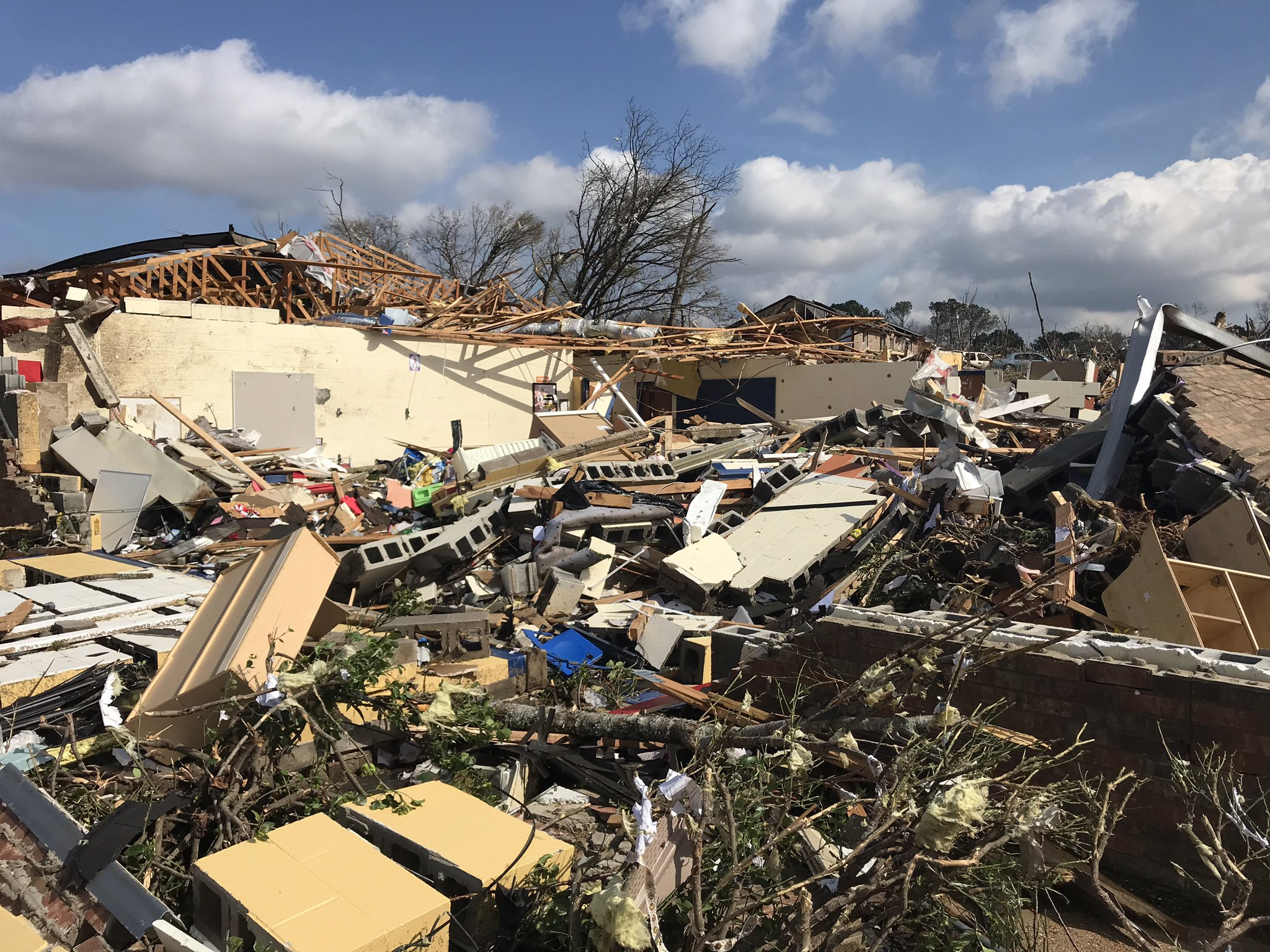
EF3-rated damage in northeastern Nashville produced by the tornado

Following the tornado, a team of engineers led by the Haag Engineering Company conducted a detailed damage survey of the event. The survey found that hundreds of wood-framed homes were destroyed by the tornado and that the worst of the tornadic damage was inflicted to homes near Mount Juliet, which were deroofed and in some cases collapsed inward. The tornado disintegrated a manufactured home south of the Donelson Christian Academy, which took a direct hit from the tornado. The steel frame of the home was found during the survey on top of the school's roof, stripped of walls. Along North 8th Street, three multi-story concrete-and-wood studio apartments collapsed during the tornado; the survey found that improperly-set nailed connections failed, resulting in the walls leaning and later collapsing under weight. The survey initially gave the tornado a low-end EF4 rating with wind speeds estimated to have been approximately 180 miles per hour (290 km/h) after surveying the apartment buildings, although that was lowered after structural deficits were found.

The survey noted damage to specific buildings, including an AutoZone shop off of US Highway 41 that was struck by the tornado. Engineers found that tornadic winds blew the western windows of the building inward, buckling the concrete masonry unit (CMU) walls and causing the roof to partially collapse downward. A strip mall in downtown Nashville that also featured CMU walls collapsed inward as a result of the tornado. The survey also detailed damage that was inflicted to the main Donelson Christian Academy building, which found that the tornado grazed the southern portions of the school, although the building was still heavily damaged. Masonry walls that made up the structure failed, causing roof trusses to detach from the main structure and collapse.

== See also ==
- Weather of 2020
- List of F3, EF3, and IF3 tornadoes (2020–present)
- Tornado outbreak of April 15–16, 1998 – a tornado outbreak that produced an F3 tornado in downtown Nashville
- 2023 Hendersonville tornado – a deadly EF2 tornado that went through parts of the northern Nashville metro

== Notes and citations ==
=== Damage Assessment Toolkit points ===
- Information on touchdown point of the tornado sourced from "Damage Assessment Toolkit (event ID 'Bells Bend')". NOAA. 2025.
  (To access the DAT report, set both dates to March 3, 2020, reload, and zoom in to the affected region around 36.17 N -86.95 W. Information is then available by clicking on the highlighted marker(s).)
- Information on lifting point of the tornado sourced from "Damage Assessment Toolkit (event ID 'Gordonsville')". NOAA. 2025.
  (To access the DAT report, set both dates to March 3, 2020, reload, and zoom in to the affected region around 36.15 N -85.90 W. Information is then available by clicking on the highlighted marker(s).)

=== Sources ===
- Marshall, Tim; Standohar-Alfano, Christine; Bright, Christopher; Hurley, Krissy (November 2022). "Damage survey of the Nashville, TN tornado: March 3, 2020". ResearchGate.
