= 2023 Hendersonville tornado =

2023 EF2 tornado across the Nashville, Tennessee metro, USA

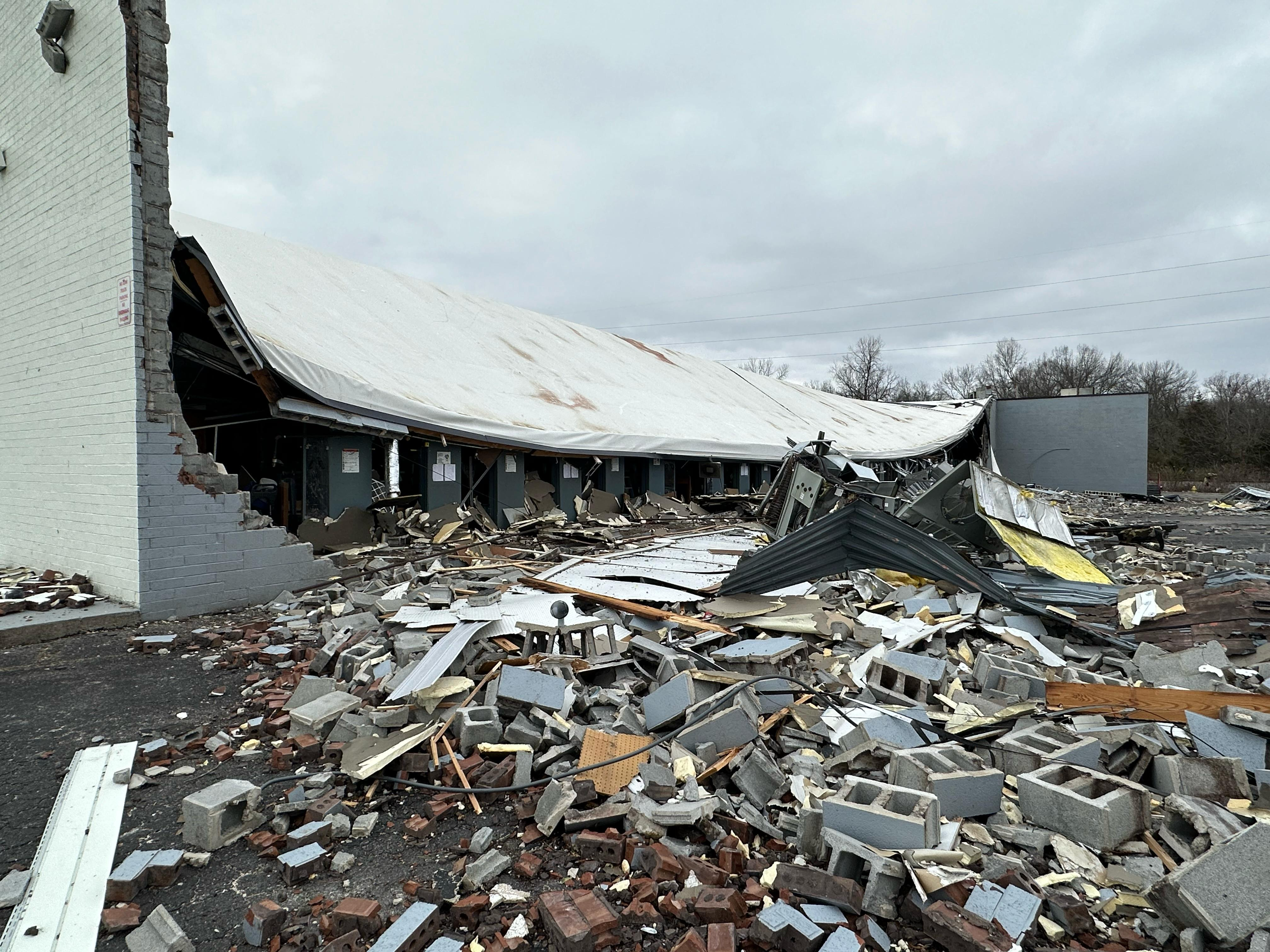
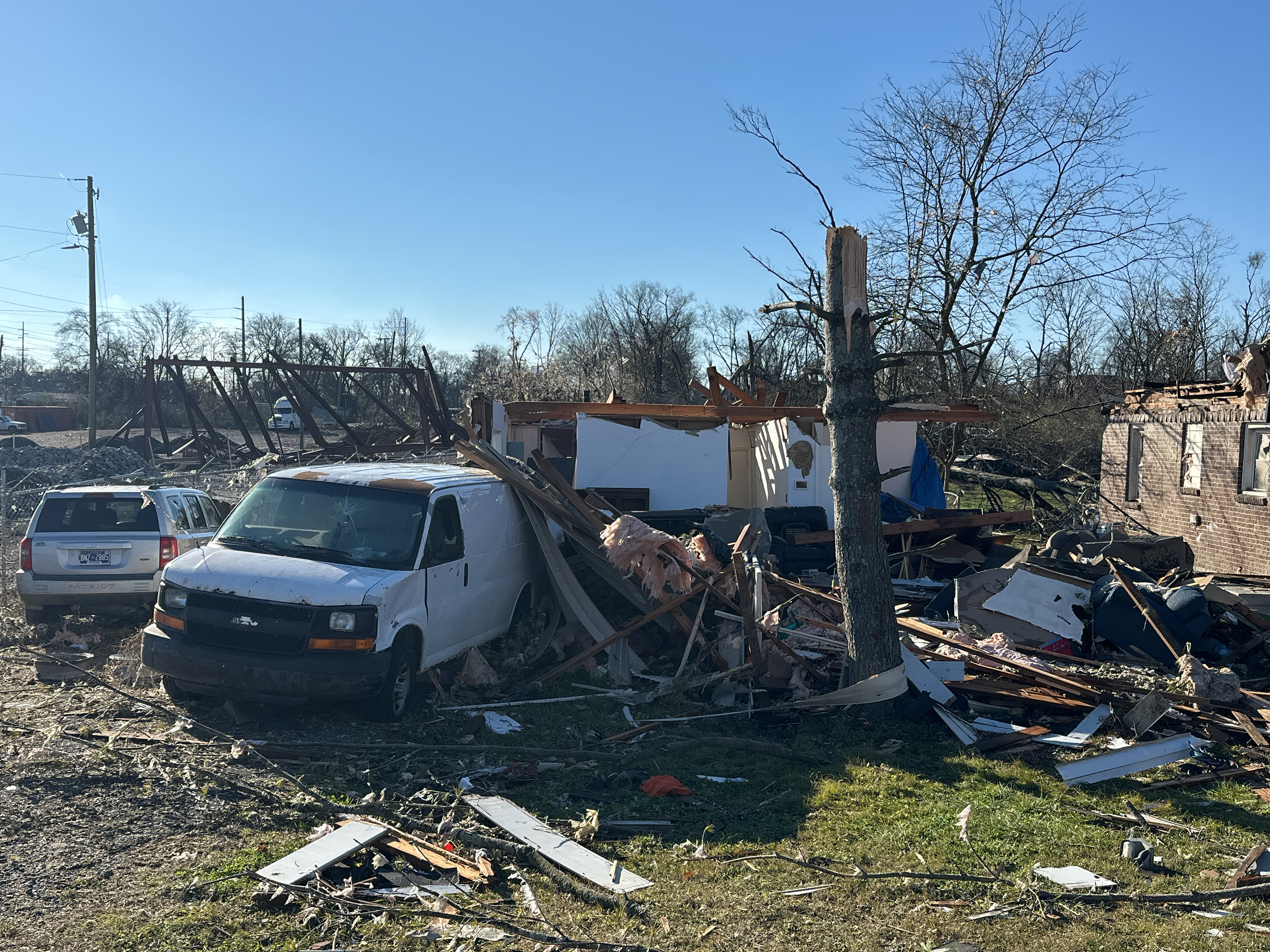
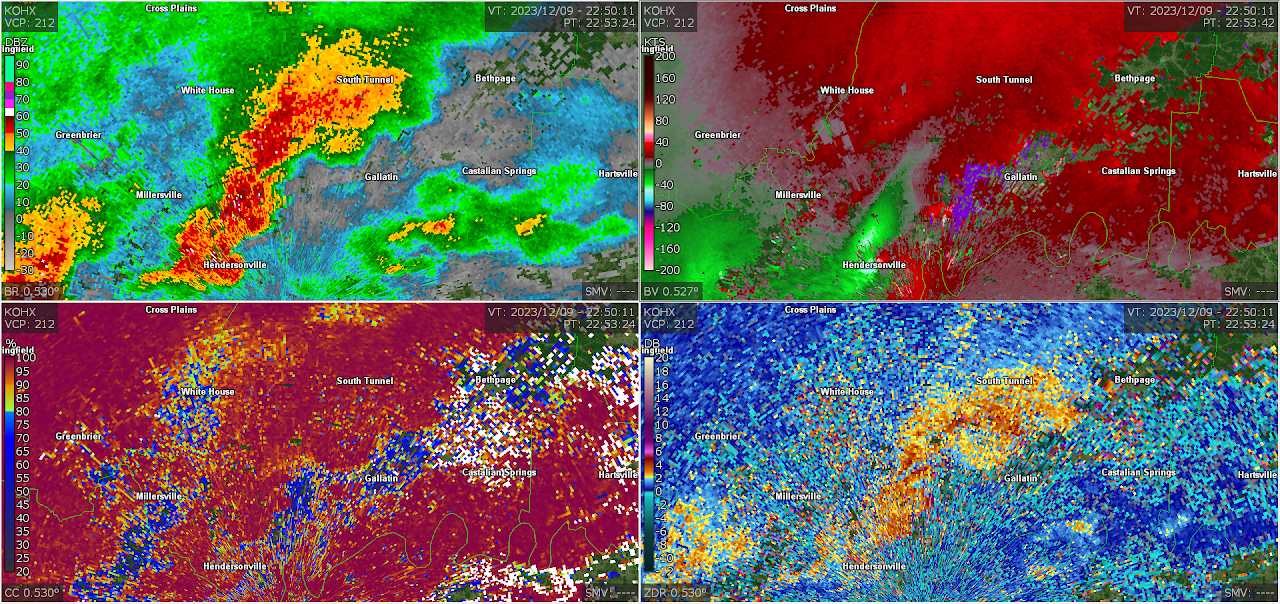
- Clockwise from the top: A visible view of the tornado in Madison, CCTV footage from within the Nashville metro showing an explosion caused by the storm, NEXRAD scan of the tornado, EF2 damage to a house along East Campbell Road, the Big Play entertainment center in Hendersonville destroyed at EF2 intensity.

Meteorological history
- Formed: December 9, 2023, 4:39 PM CST (UTC–06:00)
- Dissipated: December 9, 2023, 5:31 PM CST (UTC–06:00)
- Duration: 52 minutes

EF2 tornado
- on the Enhanced Fujita scale
- Max width: 400 yd (0.23 mi; 0.37 km)
- Path length: 34.77 mi (55.96 km)
- Highest winds: 130 mph (210 km/h)

Overall effects
- Fatalities: 3
- Injuries: 22
- Damage: $20.2 million (2023 USD)
- Areas affected: Northern Nashville metropolitan area across Davidson, Sumner and Trousdale Counties; primarily within Madison, Hendersonville, Gallatin and Castalian Springs, Tennessee, United States
- Part of the December 2023 Tennessee tornado outbreak and Tornadoes of 2023

Just after dusk on December 9, 2023, a significant and deadly tornado tore across the northern metro of Nashville, the capital and most populous city of the U.S. state of Tennessee. The EF2 tornado, known as the Hendersonville tornado by locals, was part of a late-season tornado outbreak during the 2023 season that affected mainly Tennessee, but also parts of Kentucky and Mississippi on the 9th. It was one of two deadly tornadoes to occur, with the other being an EF3 tornado that struck Clarksville earlier that day in northwestern Tennessee.

In its wake, the tornado carved a path 34.77 mi (55.96 km) long, and 400 yd (0.23 mi; 0.37 km) wide through the cities of Madison, Hendersonville and Gallatin across Davidson, Sumner and Trousdale Counties. Winds of 130 mph (210 km/h) were estimated at its peak in Hendersonville as the tornado traversed through. Three people were killed during the event, while 22 were injured. Extensive damage was caused by the tornado, with monetary costs estimated at $20.2 million (2023 USD) throughout the entire track. Within the damage track in Madison, the tornado caused a massive explosion at an electrical substation, resulting in a fireball that temporarily evaporated the tornado's condensation funnel and was widely recorded on video.

== Meteorological synoptics ==
=== Episode narrative ===
==== Broader perspective ====
SPC outlooks on December 9, 2023

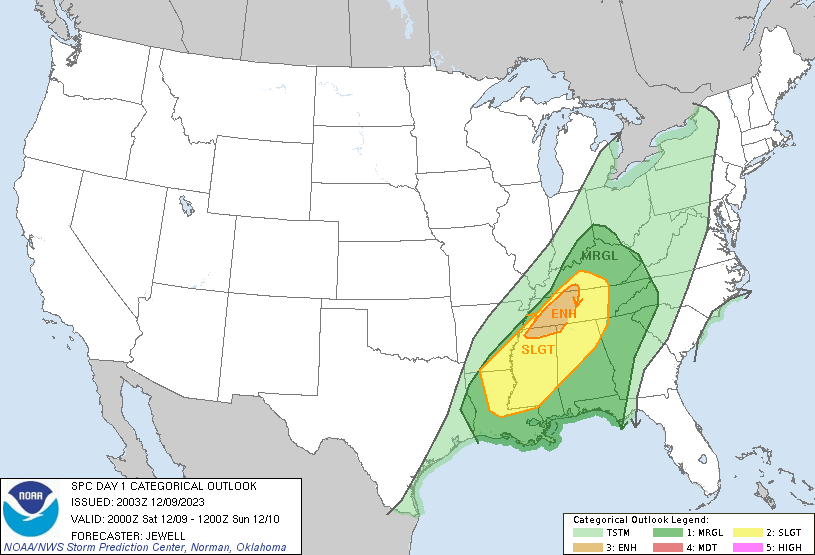
Day 1 20:00 Zulu categorical outlooks.

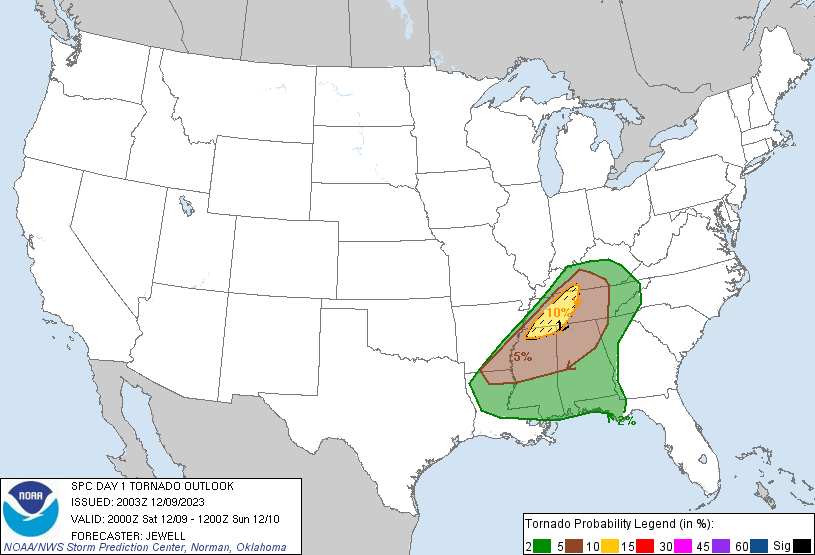
Day 1 20:00 Zulu tornado outlooks.

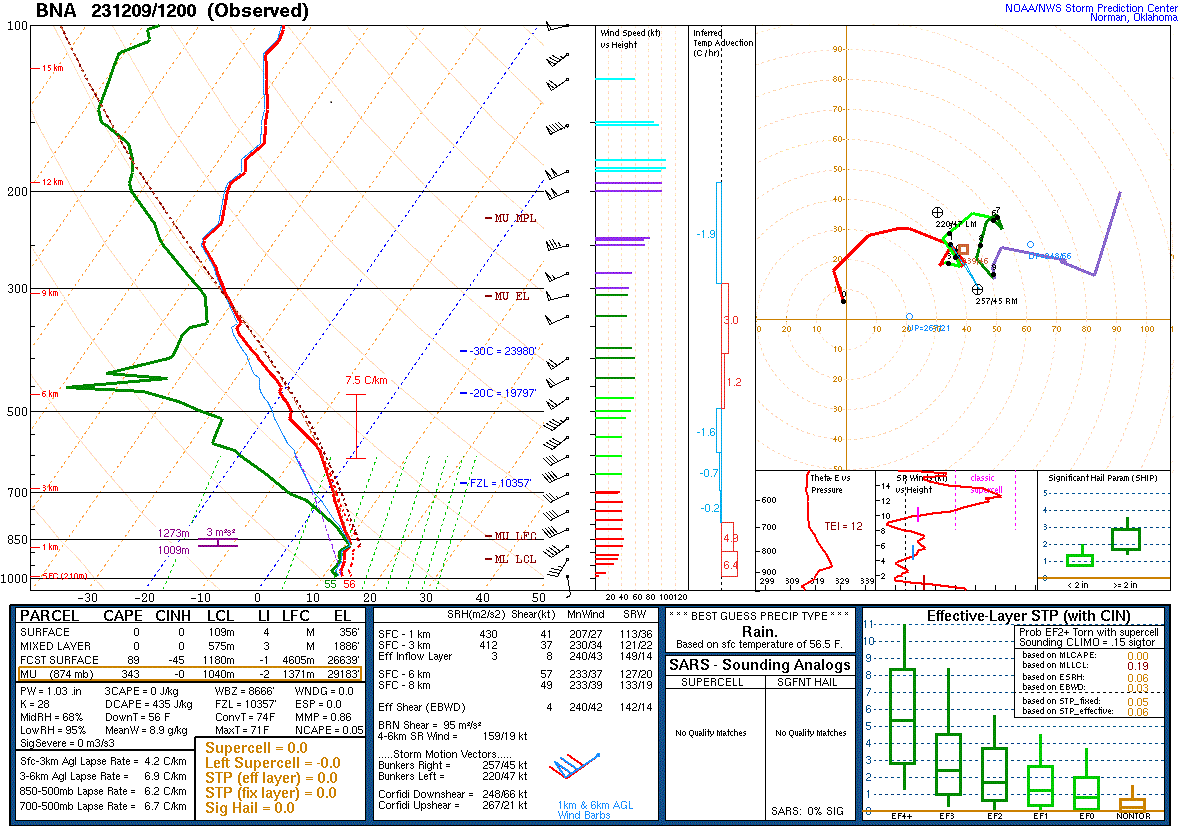
An atmospheric sounding taken by the National Weather Service office in Nashville, Tennessee at around 6:00 AM CST (12:00 UTC) on December 9.

A day prior at 01:00 UTC (7:00 PM CST) on December 8, 2023, the NOAA Storm Prediction Center (SPC) issued a marginal risk of severe storms from northeastern Texas and eastern Oklahoma to the Missouri Ozarks, with nearly all of Arkansas included. A 5% risk for hail covered the area, where as a 2% tornado risk was in place for west-central Arkansas. At 13:00 UTC (7:00 AM CST) on December 9, the SPC drastically upgraded their outlooks as a large slight risk zone for a 15% wind risk covered both the Mississippi and Tennessee River Valleys. A large 5% tornado risk was issued over southeastern Arkansas, northeastern Louisiana, north-central Mississippi, northern Alabama, northwestern Georgia, west-central Tennessee and south-central Kentucky. A 15% hail risk was also in place from northeastern Louisiana to extreme southwestern Kentucky. In the mid-levels of the atmosphere, a positively-tilted trough amplified and moved to the east across the central continental United States in response to two shortwave troughs that accompanied it. One of the troughs had a northern stream perturbation, manifesting as a closed cyclone from Nebraska to Minnesota. It was expected that this trough would devolve into an open-wave across Wisconsin later in the day. A second trough consisted of an elongated vorticity banner and a jet streak, which were present over the Four Corners region. Forecasters noted that this specific trough to the south would reorient into a positively-tilted one as it moved and positioned itself from southeastern New Mexico to southeastern Kansas. Changing from this, the second southern trough would likely absorb the southern portion of the first northern trough's vorticity field. The reformed perturbation would extend from south-central Texas, to central Arkansas to southern Illinois for the following day at 12:00 UTC (6:00 AM CST) December 10. Surface analysis at 11:00 UTC (5:00 AM CST) on December 9 revealed a weakened low-pressure area, with a cold front draped southwestward to a triple point over the Ozarks to the Trans-Pecos region. The cold front was forecasted to extend throughout much of the United States north to south, and move towards the portions of the Appalachians and Mid-Atlantic by 12:00 UTC (6:00 AM CST).

==== Local view ====
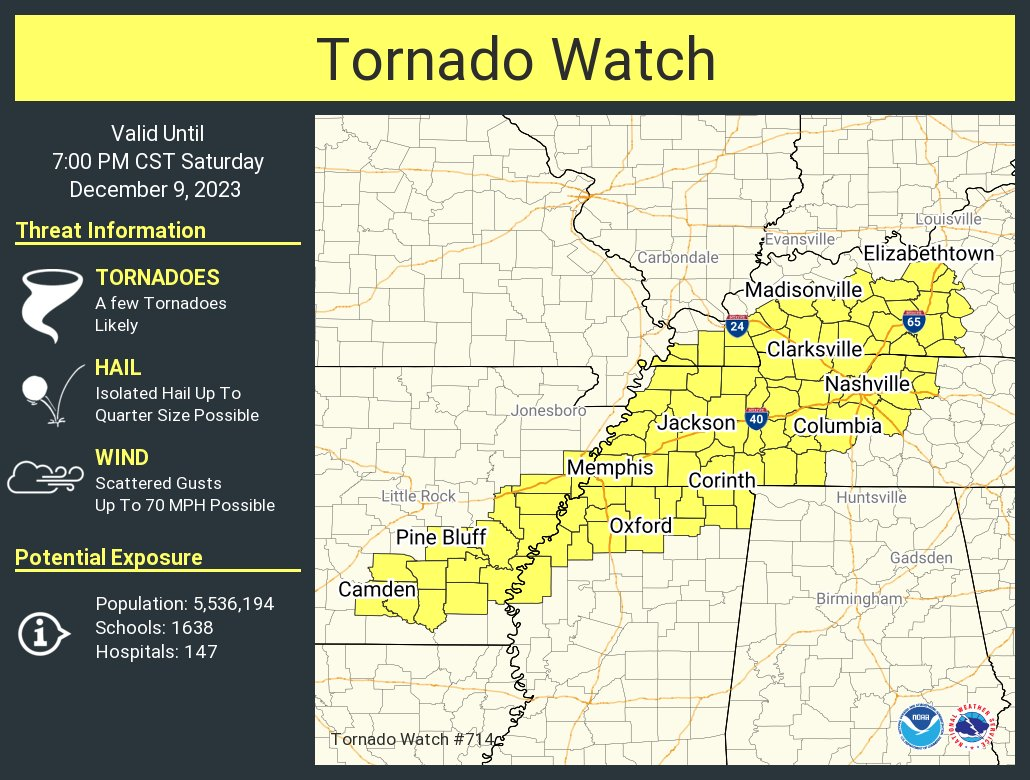
A tornado watch that was issued around 11:35 AM CST (17:35 UTC) on December 9.

For the area within the slight risk, bands of thunderstorms were expected to form ahead the cold front as early as midday in eastern Arkansas. As activity would set into the later hours, damaging wind gusts, sporadic hail to varying levels and some tornadoes were possible. The Mid-south and Tennessee River Valley areas were considered relatively maximized due to favorable supercell parameter space. However, there were concerns regarding storm modes, with a potential of messy and convective modes with a short duration of supercell thunderstorm production noted through the Community Atmosphere Model (CAM). Despite many questionable events at play for a conditional risk, this was not to rule out the possibility of a longer-lived tornado threat. Deep wind shear and hodographs were foreseen strengthening northward, with approximately 200-300 M/S^{2} of storm relative helicity being largely present around the area where the warm front was stationed within Tennessee and Mississippi, prior to the arrival of storms from eastern Arkansas. Mixed layer convective available potential energy (MLCAPE) between 500 and 800 J/KG and 1500-2000 J/KG were predicted to be present over the Ohio River Valley and Mississippi River Delta regions, providing enough fuel for supercell activity. Dew points were to be within the 50° degree Fahrenheit (10° Celsius) range and relatively colder temperatures presented themselves over the Ohio River Valley.

=== Event narrative ===
In midst of ongoing discrete thunderstorms on December 9, the SPC upgraded the forecasting outlooks to an enhanced risk for tornadoes at 20:00 UTC (2:00 PM CST), as a 10% hatched tornado risk was issued from mainly northern Mississippi to areas southwest of Nashville, Tennessee. These storms remained discrete as they developed in a pocket of instability adjacent to the low-level wind shear over the enhanced risk. A favorable storm mode and effective storm relative helicity values of 150-200 M/S^{2} posed a damaging tornado threat for the area through the later hours of the day. Though the greatest area of risk remained small, an isolated strong tornado or two were not to be precluded within the warm sector.

== Tornado summary ==
=== Formation in the Nashville metropolitan area ===
==== Madison area ====
Track of the EF2 tornado

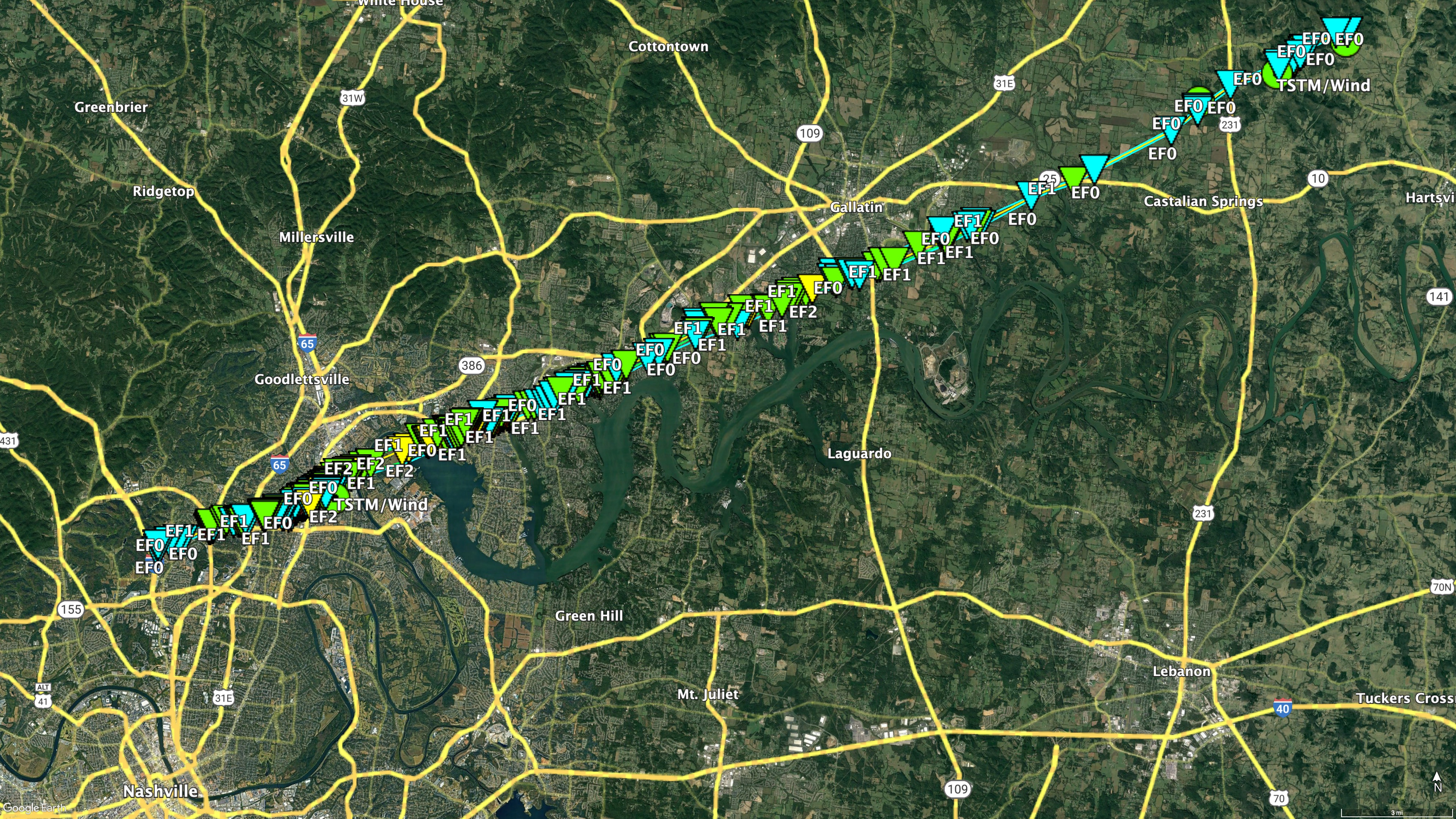
With damage indicators.

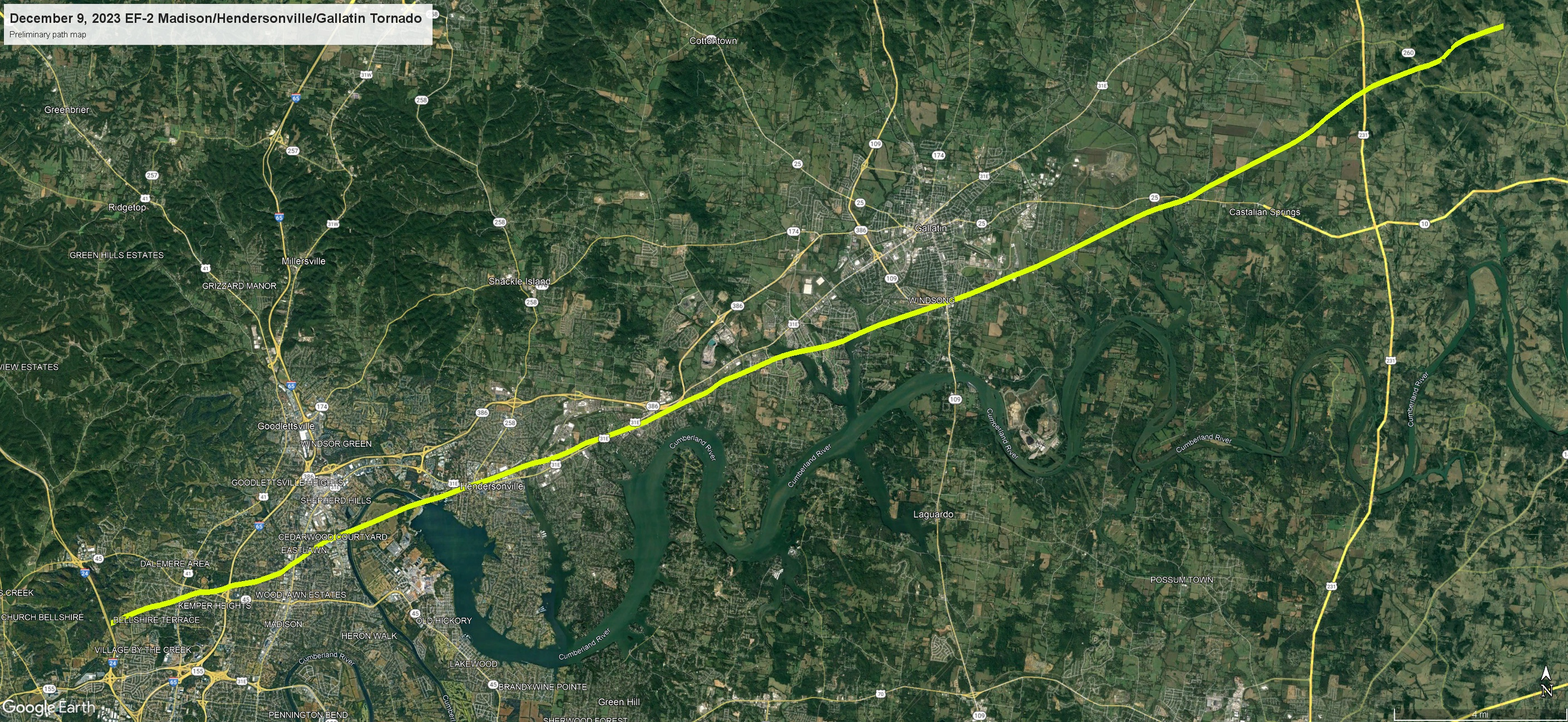
Without damage indicators.

After another EF2 tornado struck in Dickson County, the parent supercell crossed over into Davidson County and spooled up a second tornado at 4:39 PM CST (22:39 UTC), on the eastern flank of I-24 in the northern Nashville metro. Not long after it began, the tornado caused its first instance of damage, subsequently rated EF0. Intensification ensued as the storm crossed into Bellshire Estates, with EF1 damage inflicted to structures, including a motel along US 41. Further moderate damage continued as the tornado entered into the Kemper Heights area of Madison, with neighborhoods between TN 45 and Westchester Drive impacted. Upon crossing TN 45 and west of the interchange at I-65, several trees were snapped or uprooted by the tornado at EF1 intensity.

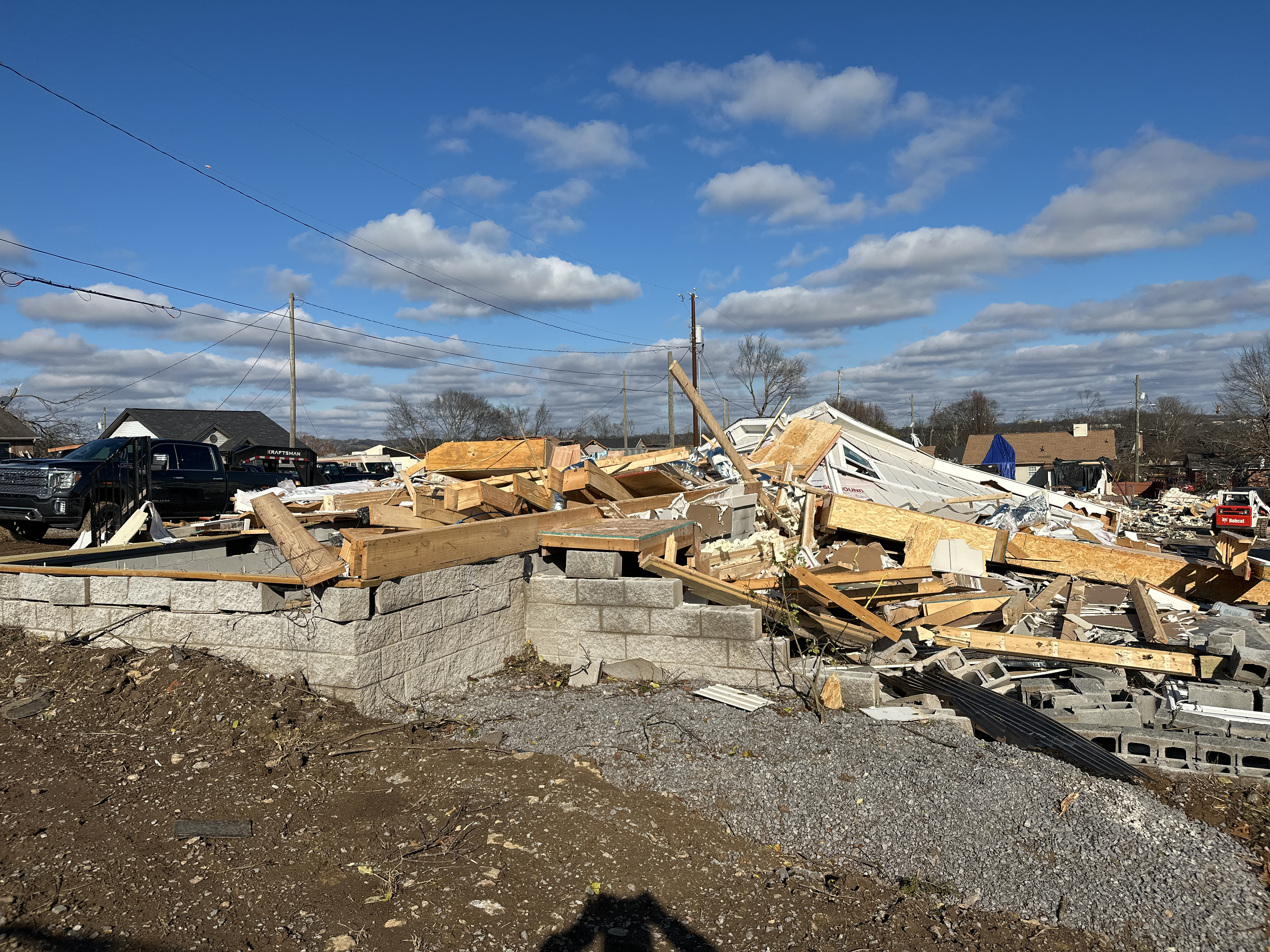
EF2 damage to an apartment complex along Palmer Avenue. It was slid off its foundation.

Up ahead, the Morning View, Haven Acres and Heritage Square areas were struck at EF0-EF1 intensity. Between East Campbell Road to the north and Nesbitt Lane to the south, the tornado intensified to EF2 intensity for the first time as it destroyed multiple mobile homes in the area, resulting in the death of three people, including a child. Across East Campbell Road to the north, an NES electrical substation was hit by the tornado at mid-range EF2 intensity with winds of 125 mph (201 km/h), causing a large explosion which briefly evaporated the tornado's condensation funnel.

Video showcasing two CCTV angles of a Nashville Electric Service substation getting impacted by the tornado.

After causing the explosion, the tornado crossed over TN 6 and began to parallel Pierce Road, impacting houses and apartments along at EF1 intensity, before intensifying and causing instances of EF2 damage for a second time, as one apartment complex was impacted with estimated winds of 115 mph (185 km/h). EF2 damage occurred to the east of Pierce Road as well, as several residences along Palmer Avenue were significantly damaged, including one complex that was slid off its foundation by winds of 120 mph (190 km/h). The tornado weakened down to EF1 intensity as it mainly uprooted trees after crossing Pierce Road, before regaining EF2 status yet again for a third time as it impacted two cul-de-sacs along Stoney River Lane with winds of 115–125 mph (185–201 km/h). The tornado dropped down to EF1 intensity as it began to enter the industrial section of Madison, damaging several warehouses before yet again strengthening to EF2 intensity for a fourth time. Here along Myatt Drive, two large metal buildings received considerable amounts of damage, after their columns' anchorage failed to resist the winds. The storm then dropped down to EF1 strength yet again as next door metal buildings received lower amounts of damage before the tornado crossed the over Cumberland River into the northern outskirts of Rayon City. For the fifth time in the tornado's life, it regained significant strength, as well as reaching its peak intensity, as high-end EF2 damage with corresponding winds of 130 mph (210 km/h) occurred to a forest on the southern bank of the Cumberland River and next to Old Hickory Lock and Dam. The tornado would then exit out of Davidson County at 4:50 PM CST (22:50 UTC), having been on the ground for 11 minutes at this point.

=== Track through Sumner County ===
==== Hendersonville and downtown ====
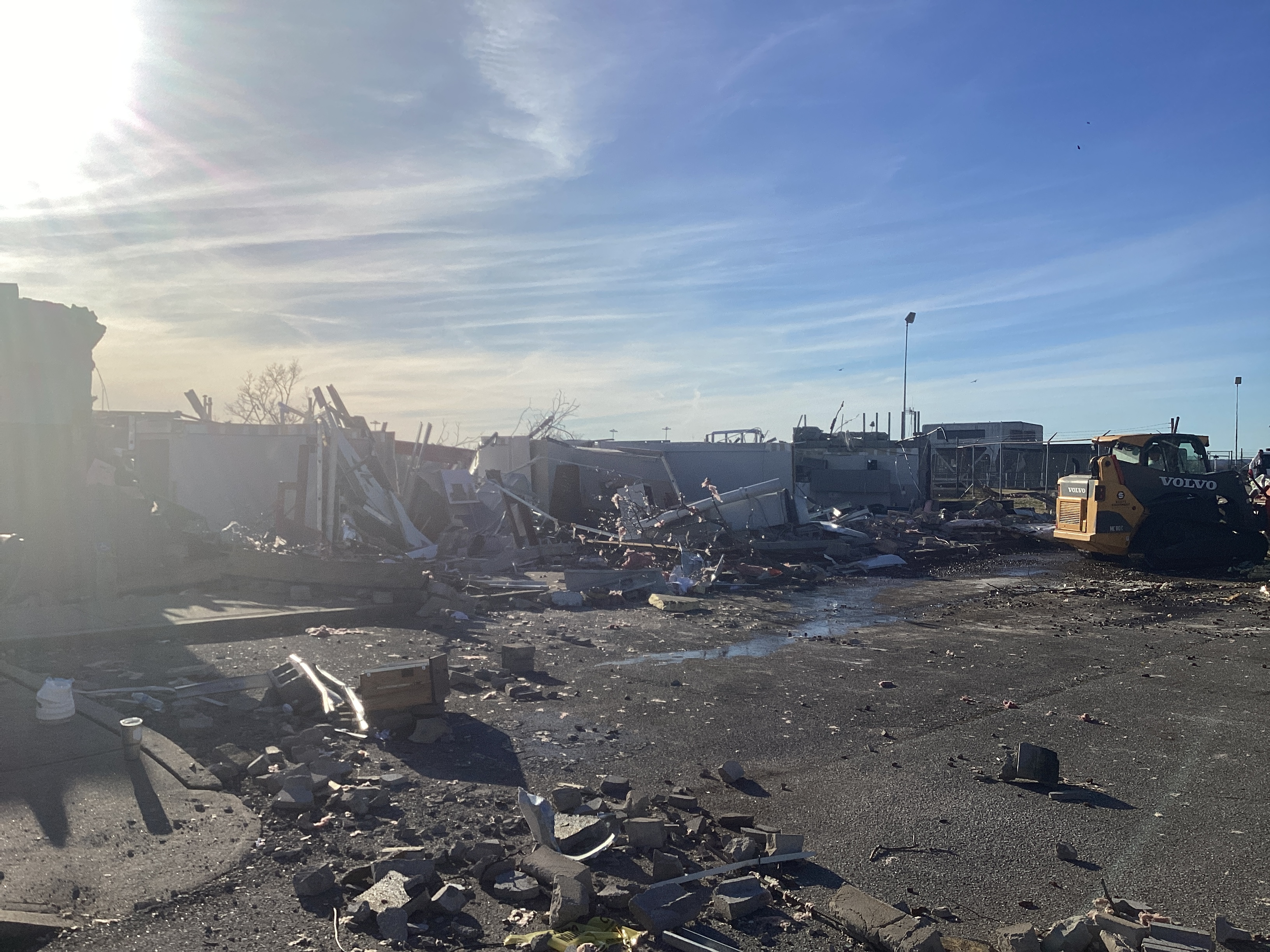
A large building next to Old Hickory Lock and Dam which sustained heavy damage.

Exactly at the time the tornado left Davidson County, it crossed the Cumberland River a second time into Sumner County, maintaining its peak strength as it entered Hendersonville. Along Overlook Circle on the northern bank of the river, the tornado heavily damaged a large building, collapsed microwave towers and caused widespread tree damage with winds at 130 mph (210 km/h). To the east, the tornado continued causing EF2 damage to a marina before weakening down to EF1 intensity as it entered a neighborhood along Rockland Road. Upon crossing TN 6 and into the central district of Hendersonville, the tornado yet again regained significant status, as many warehouses suffered damage ranging from EF1-EF2 intensity. Here, a large bowling alley and entertainment center in the path was struck, where 200 people were sheltered inside. A neighborhood to the east-northeast along Hunters Trail had two homes suffering considerable roof damage. For 6 mi (9.7 km) the tornado caused no EF2 damage as it plowed through businesses and homes paralleling TN 6.

==== Gallatin region ====
Fully entering the southwestern side of Gallatin, the tornado returned to causing EF2 damage. Just southeast of a neighborhood along Foxland Boulevard, the tornado tore down a transmission tower with winds estimated at 120 mph (190 km/h). Other neighborhoods to the east were subjected to less strong damage as the tornado displayed damage of EF1 strength. The tornado then crossed parts of Old Hickory Lake, making landfall onto a row of suburban homes along Jacobs Drive. Several houses along the street had roof damage inflicted on them, including one that sustained EF2 roof damage. After leaving many neighborhoods and crossing another part of Old Hickory Lake a second time, the tornado possessed EF2 intensity for the last time in its life, as east of Lock Road a transmission tower was collapsed at 116 mph (187 km/h). For the remainder of the tornado's track within southern Gallatin, it caused at its climax only EF1 damage to homes and businesses in the Windsong area between Nichols Lane and TN 109. Reaching the eastern outskirts of Gallatin, the tornado crossed over Sumner County Regional Airport, where a gust of 67 mph (108 km/h) was measured by the airport's AWOS.

=== Endpoint of tornado ===
The tornado would then exit Gallatin, encroaching on Albright Lane where several barns sustained EF1 damage. Ahead on Cairo Road, the tornado struck a neighborhood at EF0-EF1 intensity as homes and trees were damaged at a minor extent. Trees on Zieglers Fort Road were uprooted by the tornado, which weakened down to EF0 strength. The storm continued and crossed over Bledsoe Creek and entering the western parts of Castalian Springs. It would pass north of the community proper, causing weak damage to a barn before exiting and impacting a forest along Homer Scott Road at EF0 intensity.

At 5:24 PM CST (23:24 UTC) the tornado moved into Trousdale County, fluctuating between EF0-EF1 intensity. A few isolated residences and trees were damaged in the process, but the tornado already was nearing the end of its life. Along Hawkins Branch Road, the tornado which traveled just for 3.52 mi (5.66 km) exclusively in Trousdale County dissipated, three minutes later at 5:27 PM CST (23:27 UTC) to the northwest of Hartsville.

== Aftermath ==
=== Statistics ===
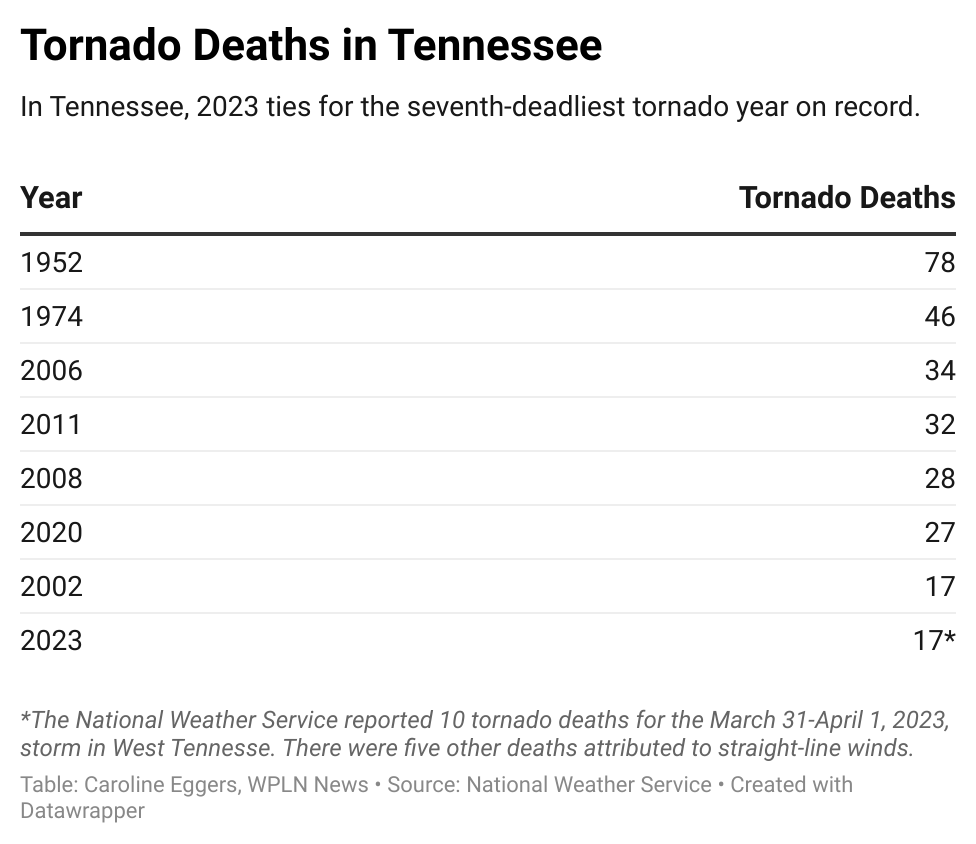
Graph of Tennessee's deadliest years for tornadoes. 2023 was tied with 2002 at seventh place.

The Hendersonville tornado, was among the few significant (EF2+) tornadoes to occur throughout mainly Tennessee during the December 2023 tornado outbreak. During the event on December 9, the Hendersonville tornado was one of two deadly tornadoes to impact that day. The other deadly tornado was an EF3 that struck Clarksville, Tennessee and Allensville, Kentucky earlier in the day, which claimed four lives. For Tennessee in 2023, which also was hit hard by a widespread outbreak in March and April of that year, the Hendersonville and Clarksville tornadoes were part of the state's seventh deadliest year for tornadoes, as 17 people were killed. This was tied with 2002.

=== Damage and casualties ===
During the event on December 9, 2023, multiple tornadoes struck central Tennessee, causing widespread damage. Many people were killed or injured by storms across the region. In total costs determined by the National Centers for Environmental Information, the Hendersonville tornado caused $20.2 million (2023 USD) in damages across Davidson, Sumner and Trousdale Counties. The tornado struck highly urbanized areas within the northern Nashville metropolitan area. Within the Nashville metro, approximately 900 properties sustained some level of damage, of which 796 of them were residential and 65 commercial per the Nashville Office of Emergency Management (OEM). 300 properties were considered "affected" by the Nashville OEM, those being of structures which suffered minor to moderate damage to their cosmetics. In Hendersonville alone, over 130 businesses were affected by the tornado. By December 10, more than 40,000 people in Tennessee were without power due to the tornado outbreak.

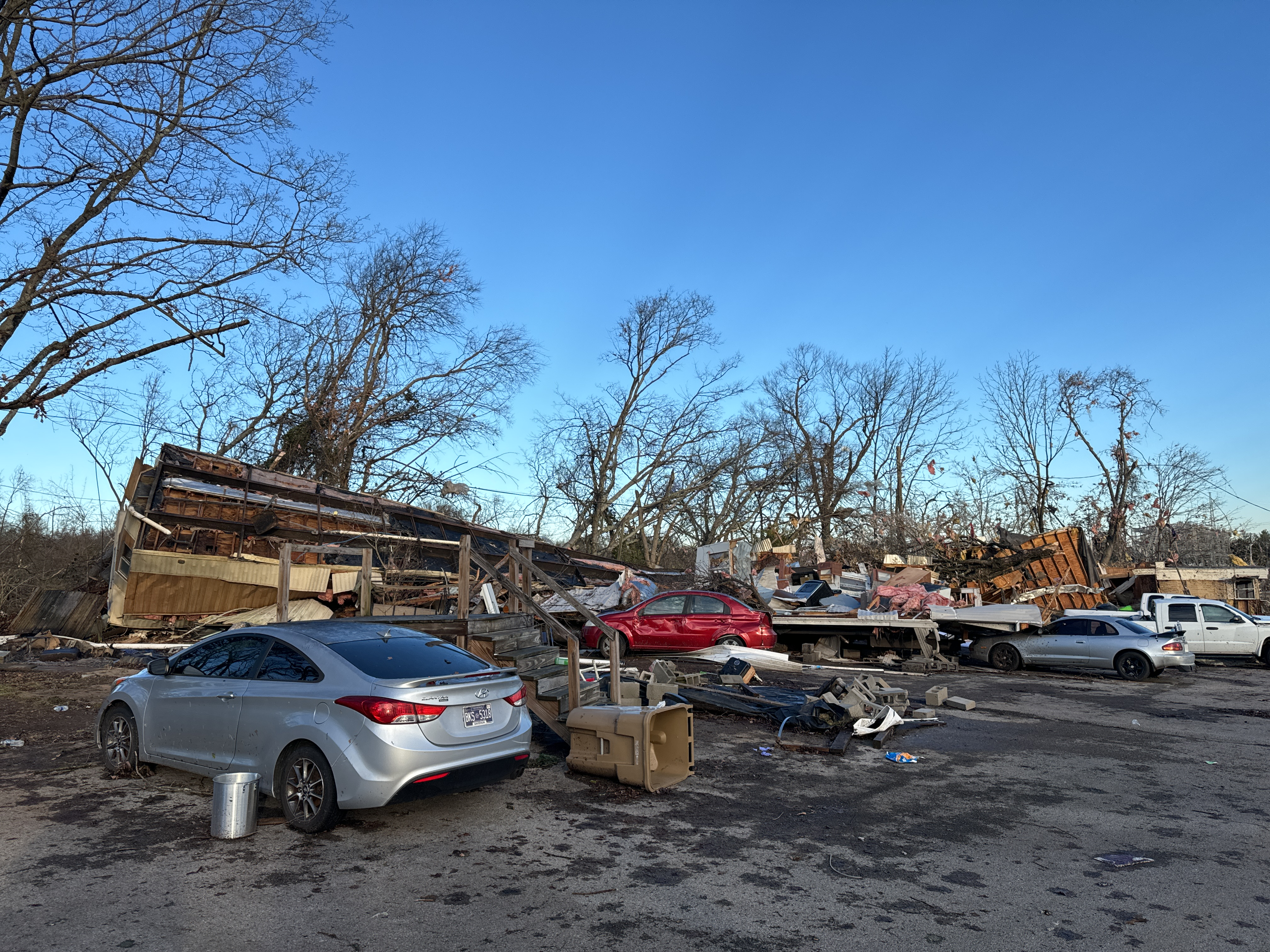
Destroyed mobile along Nesbitt Lane. This is where the fatalities occurred.

The tornado was also responsible for the deaths of three people as it struck a residential area in Madison. Two adults and a child were killed during the event. One of the victims, Joseph "Jojo" Dalton (37) was inside his mobile home, with his mother and 10-year-old son Aiden according to Dalton's partner Cassandra Diket. Diket was not at home when the tornado hit and mentioned that Joseph shielded Aiden and Dalton's mother in the residence's bathtub. The other two victims, Floridema Gabriel Perez (31) and Anthony Elmer Mendez (2) lived next door from Dalton, who were subsequently crushed by his mobile residence as the tornado struck on Nesbitt Lane. Perez's other, 7-year-old son survived the tornado and was transported to Vanderbilt Hospital. A neighbor, Wanda McClemor along with others went into search and rescue within the area next to Nesbitt Land. McClemor reportedly heard Perez screaming, where as Perez at the same time huddled with her baby as the tornado closed in. After the storm, McClemor and other neighbors eventually discovered both Floridema and Anthony killed, with Anthony wrapped in his mother's arms. The Perez family recently relocated from Guatemala to join Floridema's husband Felipe Mendez, who already was in the United States five months prior to their arrival. A GoFundMe page was set up for the family after the tornado.

=== Recovery process ===
By December 10, one day after the Hendersonville tornado and the outbreak, both Nashville mayor Freddie O'Connell and Tennessee governor Bill Lee prompted emergency declarations for regional and statewide disaster responses. The statewide declaration by Lee was considered of "Level 3" under coordination from the Tennessee Emergency Management Agency (TEMA). Such level is only designated for serious emergencies or minor disasters. By December 13, much of Tennessee as well as parts of Kentucky, were declared suitable for the Federal Emergency Management Agency's (FEMA) Individual Assistance program under then US president Joe Biden. On December 11, Taylor Swift donated $1 million (2023 USD) to the Tennessee Emergency Response Fund, at the Community Foundation of Middle Tennessee for affected communities in the state.

==== Madison ====
Madison, being part of the Nashville metropolitan area, recovered significantly though conditions due to the winter season made it difficult. Nashville Voluntary Organizations Active in Disasters (VOAD) were activated to begin recovery. On December 18, FEMA opened a disaster recovery center within Madison. The center was located along 610 Gallatin Pike South and opened from 8:00 AM to 7:00 PM CST (14:00 to 01:00 UTC).

Due to Christmas coming up, on December 16, staff and students from Amqui Elementary school organized "Operation Gift Recovery," a project for at least 27 students who lost their homes and belongings within the Madison area. The tornado displaced many children, forcing them to live in temporary homes.

For many residents a year later, it was a surreal and traumatizing experience. At the same time, the North Substation, which was destroyed by the tornado was repaired in December 2024.

==== Hendersonville ====
Recovery was steady in Hendersonville following the tornado. On December 12, disaster recovery and relief teams from Inspiritus, a non-profit organization which arrived into the city for home assessments and debris removal. Many survivors were given aid regarding humanitarian assistance and housing recovery.

In Hendersonville, the tornado left 137 businesses damaged at varying levels. This created a difficult period for citizens who had no access to services. Three weeks after the tornado, many businesses united with each other to rebuild during the lengthy recovery process. The Hendersonville Chamber of Commerce was notified that despite the effort, some companies were at risk for financial restraints, which likely would prevent some properties to reopen to the public. The following year in 2025, the Big Play entertainment and bowling center, which was struck by the tornado was put up for demolition.

In January 2024, extensive recovery of Old Hickory Lock and Dam was done by the U.S. Army Corps of Engineers's Nashville District. The tornado uprooted many trees at a recreational area, destroyed picnic shelters, damaged the exterior of the hydropower plant and also tore the roof off the Electric Service Section Building. The road leading to the dam was closed off due to the extent of the damage.

==== Gallatin ====
Within Gallatin, a state of emergency was declared after the tornado. Power was lost to 13,000 residents within the city, which by December 10 was mostly recovered. Mayor Paige Brown exclaimed that the biggest challenge for affected citizens, was to find temporary housing spots. Officials from the city's fire department and building codes alongside insurance adjusters surveyed the damage within the affected areas in Gallatin.

== Fireball incident ==
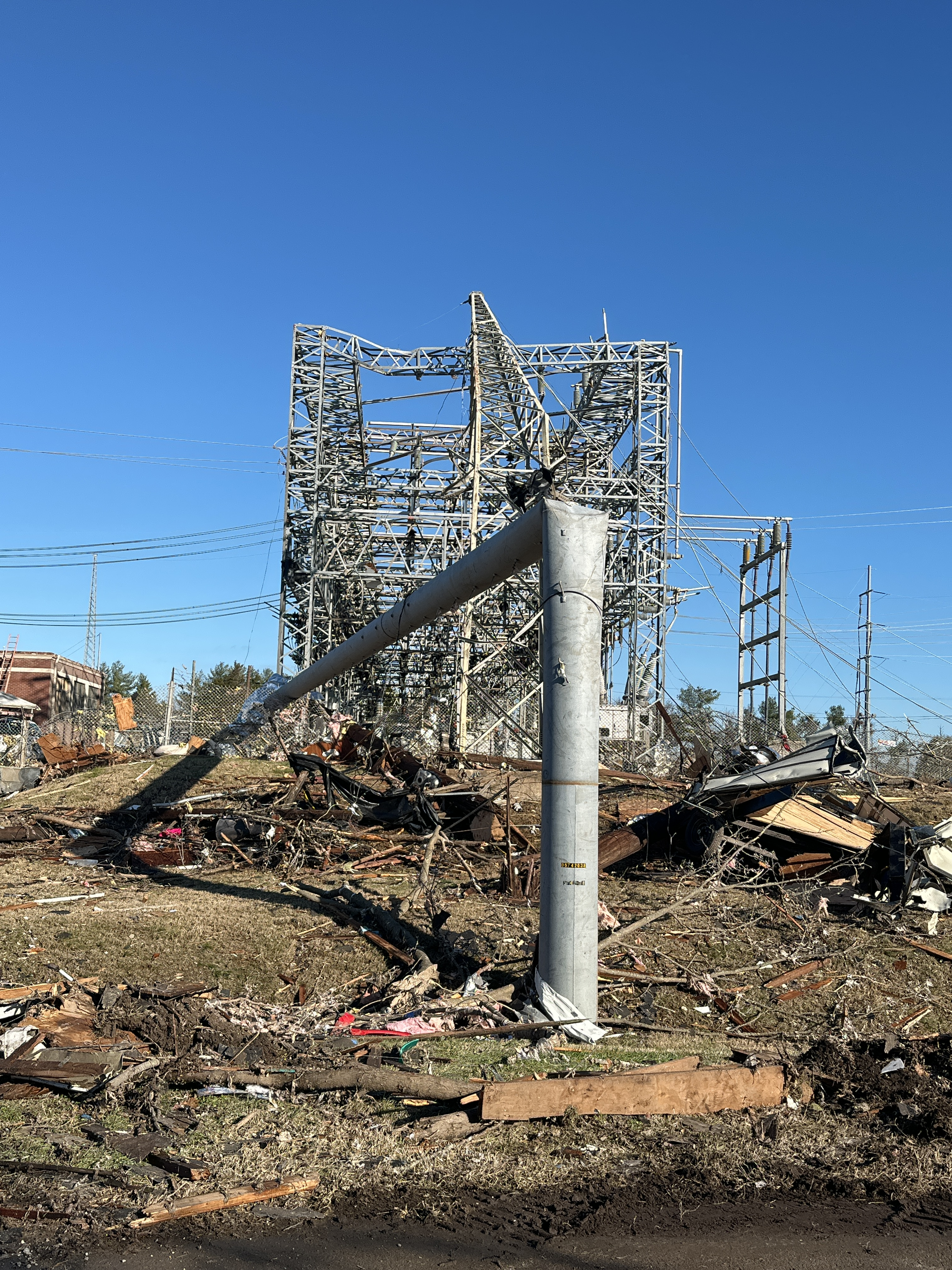
The power station in Madison to the west of US 31E. This is where the viral explosion and fireball originated from.

As the then EF2-strength tornado crossed East Campbell Road where the three deaths occurred nearby, it struck the North Substation, belonging to the Nashville Electric Service utility corporation. Upon impacting, the tornado at first caused numerous power flashes and sending large sparks flying, before producing a breaker explosion. The explosion was caused by the tornado as it destroyed a mineral oil tank. Oil from the cooling system of a transformer was impacted by flying debris in the tornado, which subsequently came in contact with destroyed wiring which generated in a massive fireball. Heat from the destroyed substation caused a drop in humidity within the tornado's condensation funnel.

The fire caused the tornado's appearance to briefly decondense, due to dramatic thermodynamic gradient changes. Via these drastic gradient shifts, water molecules within the tornado vortex began to exert extremely via the Clausius-Clapeyron equation as a result, according to meteorologist and storm chaser Reed Timmer. In layman's terms, it was mentioned by Timmer that tornadoes could theoretically be blown up, possibly through the use of explosives.

The fireball and prior detonation of the station were seen and recorded by many people within the Nashville metro area, and were also live streamed by public live cameras.

== See also ==
- Tornadoes of 2023
- Weather of 2023
- Tornado climatology
- 2020 Nashville tornado – A long-lived EF3 tornado which directly went through downtown Nashville over 3 years prior
