= Pegram =

Pegram is a surname. Notable people with the surname include:

- Aaron Pegram (1974-2026), American operatic tenor
- Amelia Blossom Pegram (1935–2022), South African writer and performer
- Erric Pegram (born 1969), American football player
- Frank Pegram (1890–1944), British Royal Navy officer
- Fred Pegram (1870–1937), English illustrator and cartoonist
- George Pegram (disambiguation), multiple people
- Henry Alfred Pegram (1862-1937), British sculptor
- John Pegram (disambiguation), multiple people
- Larry Pegram (born 1973), American motorcycle racer
- Lorna Pegram (1926–1993), British television producer and novelist
- Michael E. Pegram (born 1952), American fast food retailer and racehorse owner
- Nigel Pegram (born 1940), South African-born British actor
- William Pegram (1841–1865), confederate army officer
- William Howell Pegram (1846–1928), American chemist and educator

== Places ==
- For the locality in Idaho see Pegram, Idaho
- For the locality in Tennessee see Pegram, Tennessee
