= Nashville Electric Service =

Public electric utility serving Nashville, Tennessee

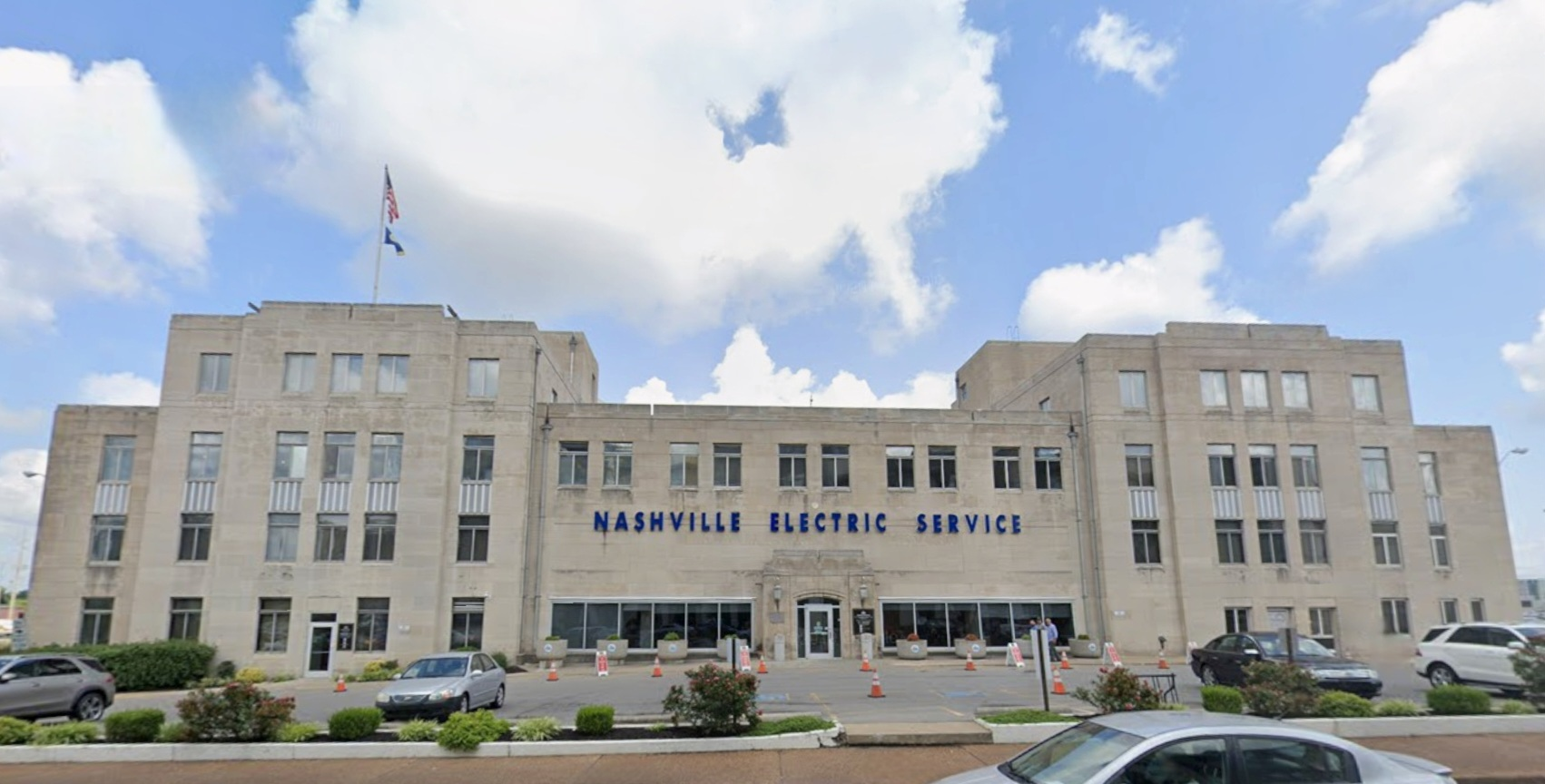
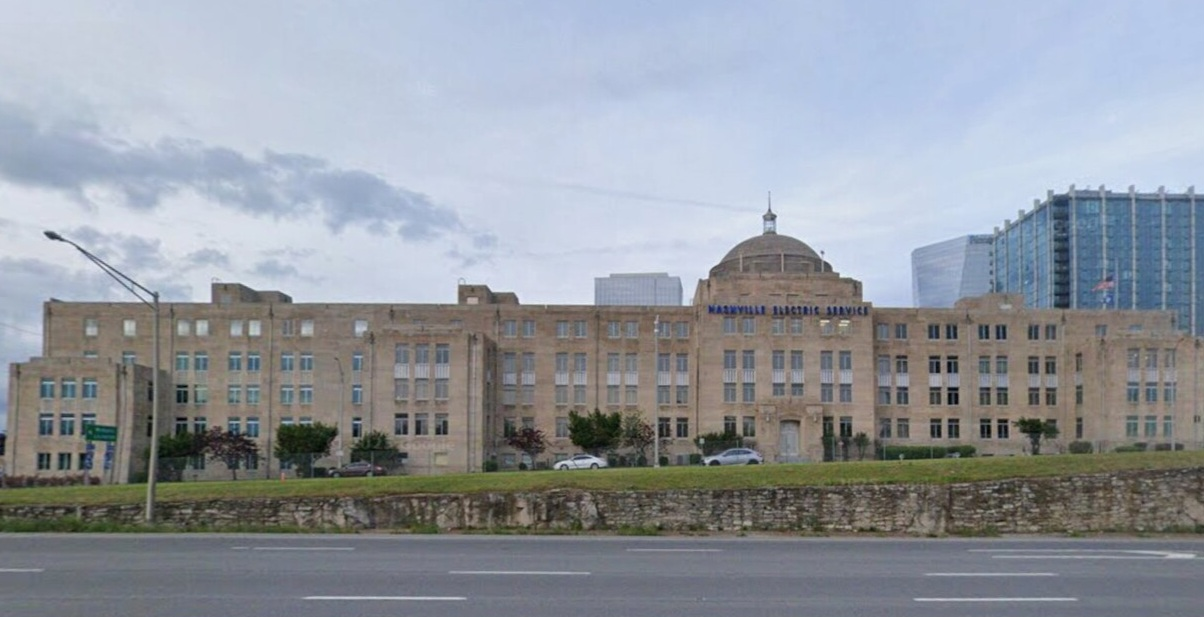
- NES building NES building I-40 view
- Type: Public
- Industry: Electric utility
- Founded: August 16, 1939
- Headquarters: Nashville, Tennessee, U.S.
- Area served: Nashville, Tennessee
- Key people: Teresa Broyles-Aplin (CEO)
- Products: Electricity
- Operating income: ▲$106,067,000 (2024)
- Total assets: ▲$2,115,344,000 (2023)
- Website: https://www.nespower.com

Nashville Electric Service is one of the eleven largest public electric utilities in the United States, distributing energy to more than 450,000 customers in Middle Tennessee. The NES service area covers 700 square miles (1,800 km^{2}), all of Nashville/Davidson County and portions of the six surrounding counties.

== Operation ==
The Nashville Electric Service is governed by a five member Electric Power Board, appointed by the mayor and confirmed by the Metro Council. Members serve five-year staggered terms without pay. The board appoints a chief executive officer who has responsibility for day-to-day operations, including hiring of employees.

The NES purchases their power from the Tennessee Valley Authority (TVA), a federally owned utility which serves Tennessee and parts of six surrounding states. In 2016, the sources of electricity purchased by the NES from TVA included 39.8% nuclear, 25.8% coal-fired, 21.5% natural gas-fired, 9.7% hydroelectric power, and 3.2% from wind and solar.

== History ==
In 1938, the Tennessee Electric Power Company, the investor-owned utility for the Nashville area since 1922, sued the Tennessee Valley Authority for selling power in Nashville. TEPCO lost the suit, and was broken up in 1939. TVA bought TEPCO's assets for $79 million, while the city of Nashville took over TEPCO's power generation and distribution network and created the Electric Power Board of Nashville to run it. The Board adopted Nashville Electric Service as its operating name, and TEPCO's 500 employees became employees of NES. The board became part of the newly formed metropolitan government after the merger of Nashville and Davidson County in 1963.

== See also ==
- Tennessee Valley Authority
