= 2025 St. Louis tornado =

EF3 tornado in Missouri and Illinois, U.S

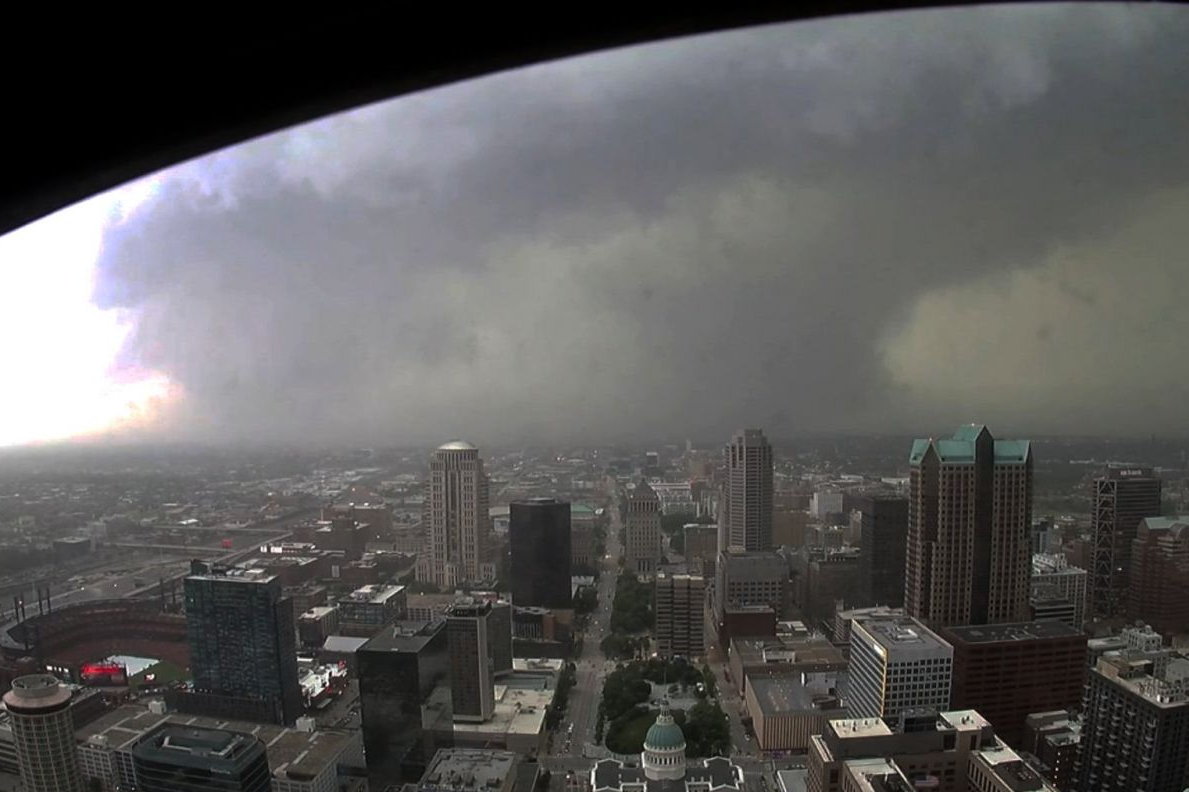
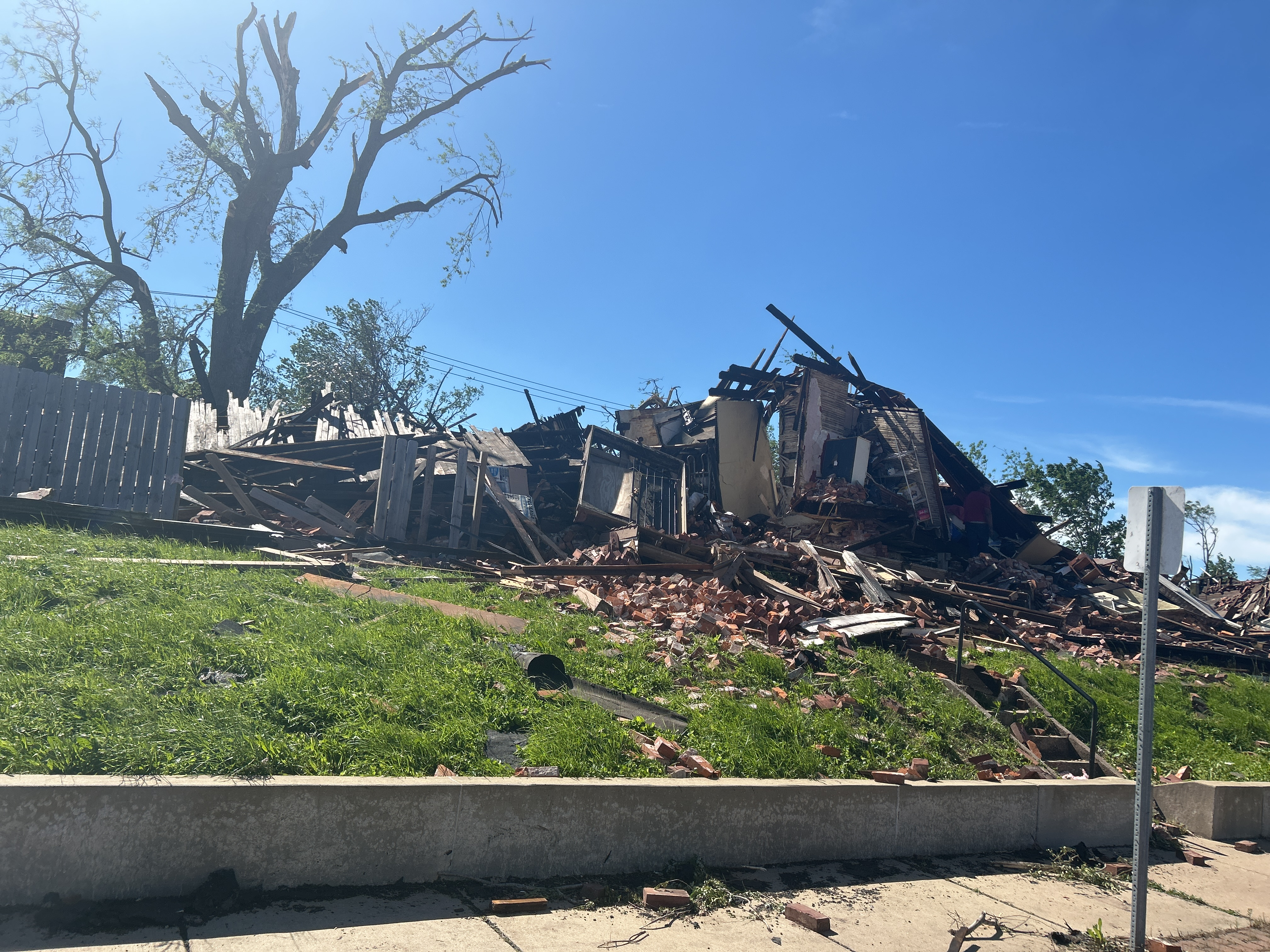
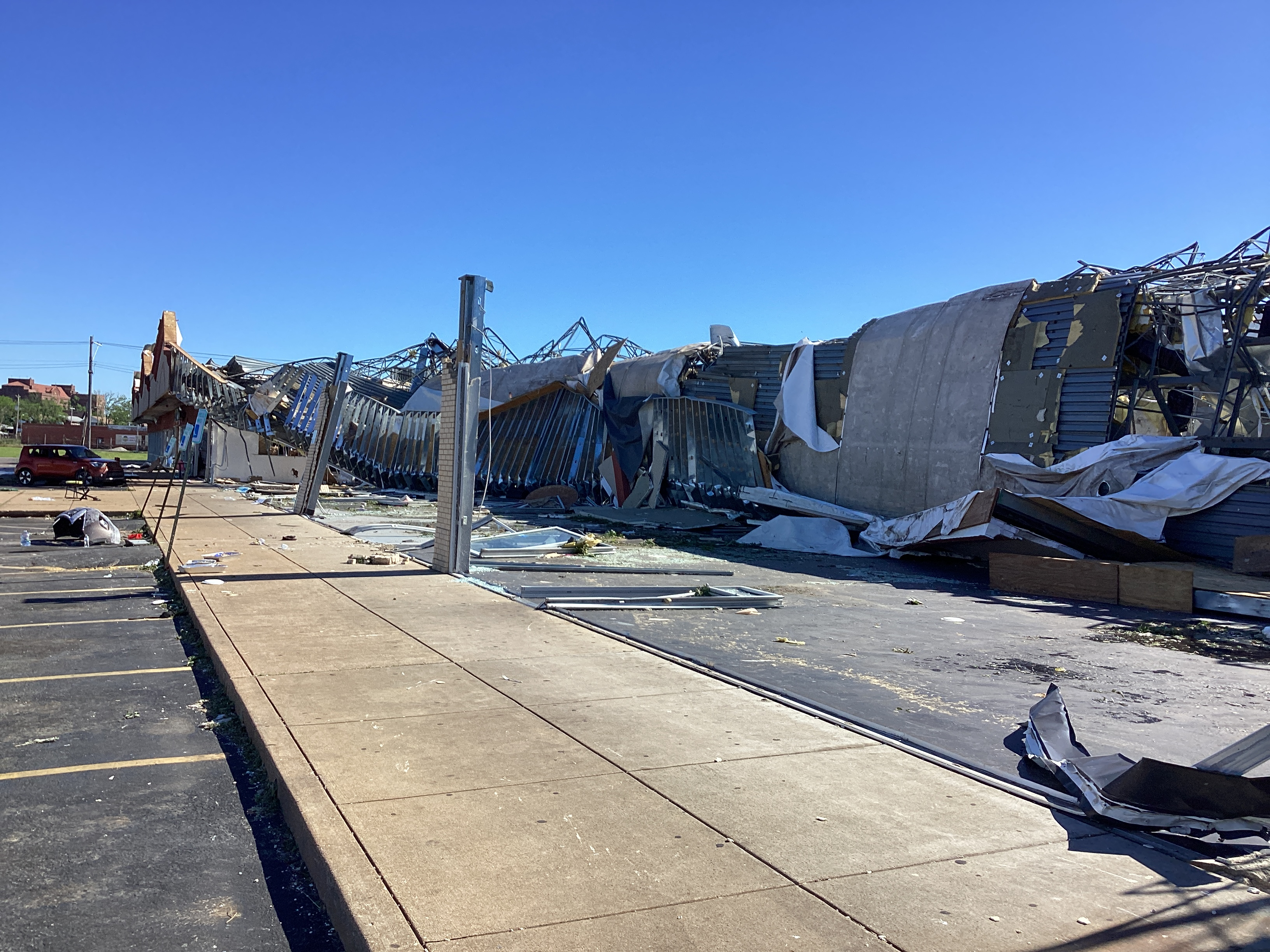
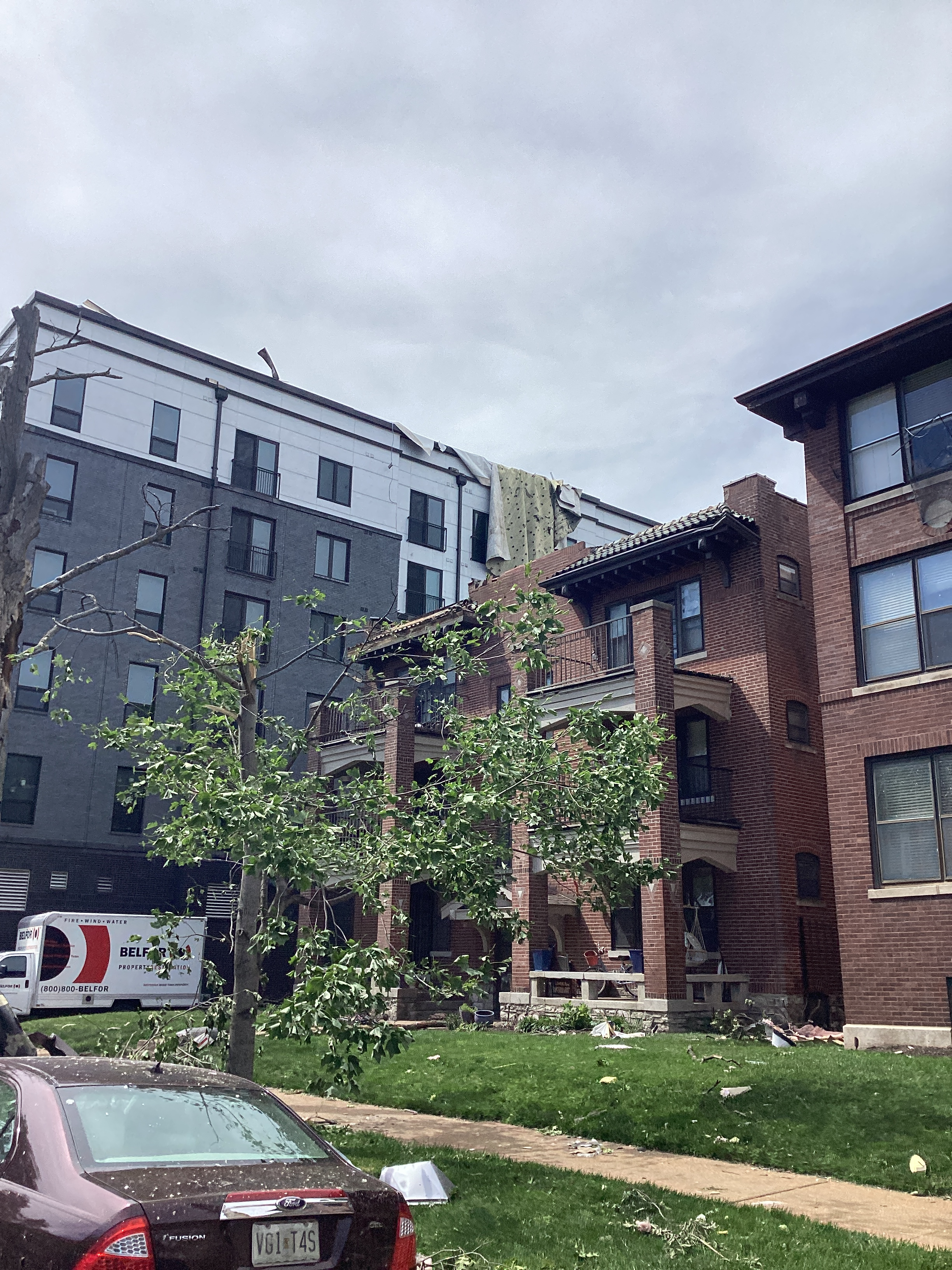
- Clockwise from the top: The tornado at peak intensity over St. Louis, Missouri as seen from the Gateway Arch; CCTV footage of the tornado around North Newstead Avenue; EF2 damage to The Hudson apartment complex along Pershing Avenue; a strip mall destroyed at EF3 intensity in the Fountain park area; most walls of a house torn down in the Greater Ville neighborhood

Meteorological history
- Formed: May 16, 2025, 2:39 p.m. CDT (UTC–05:00)
- Dissipated: May 16, 2025, 2:53 p.m. CDT (UTC–05:00)
- Duration: 14 minutes

EF3 tornado
- on the Enhanced Fujita scale
- Max width: 3,168 yd (1.8 mi; 2.9 km)
- Path length: 12.29 mi (19.78 km)
- Highest winds: 152 mph (245 km/h)

Overall effects
- Fatalities: 4 (+1 non-tornadic) (Note: The death of 48-year-old Juan Baltazar was initially attributed to the tornado, but a later assessment attributed his death to non-tornadic winds.)
- Injuries: 38 (+1 indirect)
- Damage: $1.6 billion (2025 USD)
- Areas affected: Clayton, Richmond Heights, Fountain Park, Kingsway East, Greater Ville, O'Fallon areas in St. Louis, Missouri to Madison and Granite City, Illinois, United States
- Part of the Tornado outbreak of May 15–16, 2025 and Tornadoes of 2025

On the afternoon of May 16, 2025, an intense, extremely large, and destructive tornado tracked for more than 12 miles (19 km) through urban areas of Greater St. Louis, including Greater Ville and Fountain Park, in the U.S. state of Missouri. The massive and rainwrapped EF3 tornado, which was 1.8 mi (2.9 km) wide at its largest, inflicted widespread destruction across St. Louis, Missouri. Upon crossing the Mississippi River into Illinois, the tornado weakened rapidly and dissipated just north of downtown Granite City. Officials from the Federal Emergency Management Agency called the residential damage the largest-scale the organization had surveyed since the 2011 tornado in Joplin, Missouri. Federal aid has been requested but is pending acceptance. Volunteer engineers have been surveying homes throughout the city. Damage estimate put the damage caused by the tornado at $1.6 billion, among the highest figures for an individual tornado on record. The tornado was the first deadly tornado in St. Louis since 1959, and the largest ever in the region.

== Meteorological synopsis ==
=== Model forecasts ===
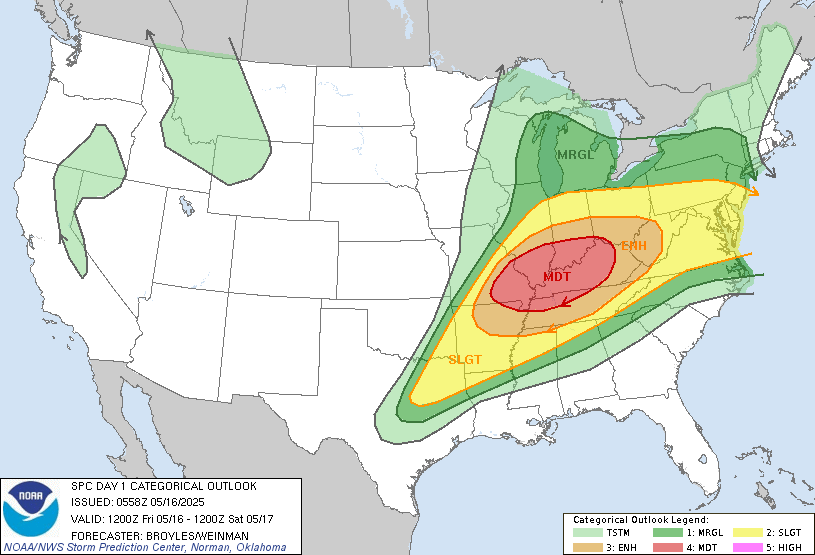
The SPC Day 1 convective outlook for May 16, 2025

The Storm Prediction Center outlined a moderate (4/5) risk of severe weather over much of the middle Mississippi and lower Ohio valleys in the Midwestern United States on May 16 as a strong upper-level trough was forecasted to be over the Upper Midwest. St. Louis was included in the northern area of the moderate risk, driven by the threat of severe hail and damaging winds; though the area of greatest tornadic potential was believed to lie further south and southeast. Following the remnants of a severe weather system the previous day, a cold front was forecast to move through much of the Midwest and through the Ohio and Tennessee valleys that evening. Strong mid-level flow and shear values would contribute to ideal conditions for the development of storms, potentially developing into supercells, over eastern and southern Missouri that evening.

Forecasters at the St. Louis National Weather Service office were monitoring the potential for severe weather across the region early in the morning. An area forecast discussion was issued shortly before 3 a.m. CDT, discussing the implications of environmental parameters and model guidance for that afternoon. Models had been showing that the greatest risk of severe weather across the region would exist between 1 p.m. and 5 p.m. CDT. While the specifics of when and where storms would develop were unclear, model runs showed that the convective environment overseen by the St. Louis office would consist of high levels of convective instability in excess of 3,000 J/kg, with matching lapse rates of 7.5–8.5 degrees Celsius per kilometer and shear values of 50–60 knots ahead of the cold front. The primary hazards outlined at the time were large hail above 2 in (5.1 cm) in diameter, while the risk of both strong downburst wind gusts potentially stronger than 80 mph (130 km/h), and tornadoes, some potentially being strong, was also recognized by forecasters.

=== Storm initiation ===
Shortly before noon, the Storm Prediction Center issued a mesoscale discussion concerning the development of storms over southwestern Missouri and eastern Arkansas. These storms existed ahead of the cold front and were expected to develop into supercells with time, whereas the environment ahead of the front was developing extreme instability. Forecasters believed that storm coverage would expand over the rest of Missouri, as well as parts of Arkansas and Illinois, as the day progressed. Also around this time, a tornado watch was issued across much of Missouri, including St. Louis, with the underlying environment expected to favor supercells throughout the day and a hazard of potentially intense tornadoes existed throughout the region.

At 2:08 p.m., the warm front had reached St. Louis, and more supercells had developed across the line ahead of the cold front and dry line. Southerly winds had brought dew points in St. Louis up to 68 °F (20 °C) at this time. The environment across and ahead of the line of supercells was conducive to the threat of large hail potentially above 4 in (10 cm) in diameter, and low-level helicity would support the threat for tornadoes, although these were expected to be further south over southeastern Missouri and neighboring parts of Illinois and Kentucky. A tornado warning was issued for St. Louis and surrounding areas by the National Weather Service St. Louis, Missouri at 2:34 pm CDT, as a storm over St. Ann and Overland had attained tornadic rotation. Five minutes later at 2:39 pm CDT, the tornado touched down.

== Tornado summary ==
=== Track across St. Louis, Missouri ===
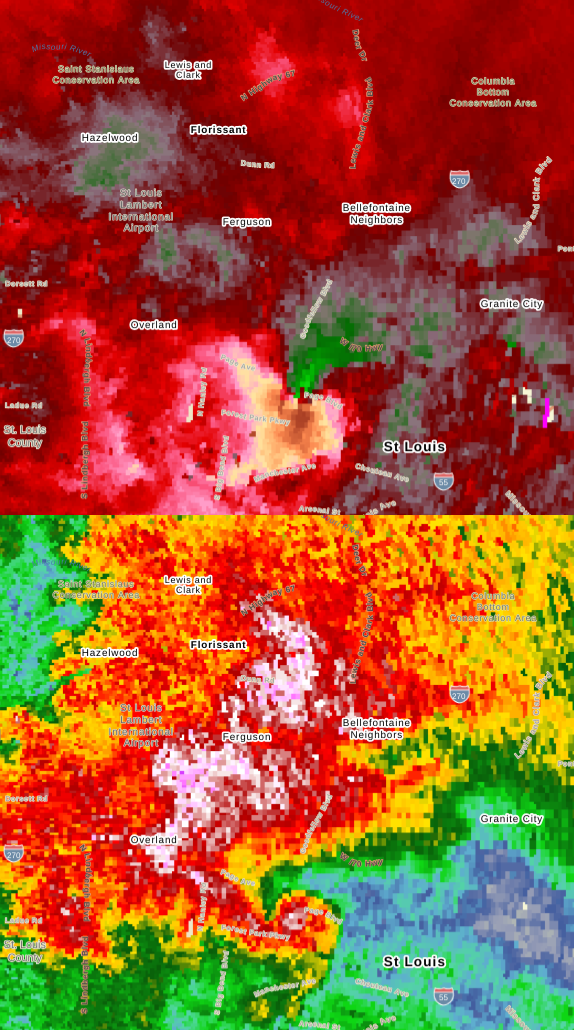
The tornado shortly after touching down as seen on WSR-88D reflectivity and velocity, exhibiting a hook echo, tornado vortex signature, and tornado debris signature

The tornado first touched down at 2:39 pm CDT in Clayton just east of I-170 in St. Louis County, Missouri. Upon touching down, the tornado immediately reached EF2 intensity as it moved east-southeastward, causing considerable roof damage to an apartment building. It then passed through Clayton at EF1 strength, damaging apartment buildings, homes, and low-rise buildings, uprooting trees, and snapping tree branches. Turning east-northeastward, the tornado crossed over the Fontbonne University campus, inflicting EF1 damage to multiple buildings on the campus and snapping trees; one area of EF2 damage was noted, with some power poles that were snapped. East of the campus, the tornado caused widespread EF1 damage as it snapped or uprooted trees and caused minor to major roof damage to homes. MetroLink, St. Louis' rail transportation network, suffered damage to overhead power systems between Forest Park–DeBaliviere station and Brentwood I-64 station as the tornado moved over the majority of this segment. The tornado then entered the City of St. Louis and began to rapidly grow in size, snapping more trees in the Wydown/Skinker neighborhood before causing additional widespread tree damage as it clipped Forest Park and the Skinker DeBaliviere neighborhood. The tornado again reached EF2 intensity as it struck DeBaliviere Place. It heavily damaged multiple apartment buildings, including two that received high-end EF2 damage, damaged homes, low-rise and mid-rise buildings, shattered windows, and snapped and uprooted numerous trees. The tornado then briefly reached its peak intensity of mid-range EF3 for the first time and reached its maximum width 1.8 mi (2.9 km) as it impacted the Academy neighborhood, leaving one home with only interior walls left standing while an abandoned home nearby was leveled and swept away. Additional homes, churches, mid-rise buildings, traffic lights, power poles, and trees were heavily damaged as well as the tornado moved into the Fountain Park neighborhood.

The tornado then regained EF3 intensity again on the north side of Fountain Park, partially destroying a strip mall and flattening a brick townhouse. Elsewhere across this area, as well as the adjacent neighborhoods of Lewis Place and Kingsway East, the tornado inflicted widespread EF2-EF3 damage. Abandoned townhouses were leveled and swept away, several businesses and brick townhouses had walls and windows blown out and roofs partially and completely removed, and there was widespread damage to trees, power poles, and traffic lights. Part of the Centennial Christian Church, with three people inside, collapsed; although everyone was rescued, one person later died from their injuries. Other churches had windows shattered and exterior damage as well. A church nearby had its roof partially removed, and its steeple knocked off. Minor damage was also noted in The Ville neighborhood.

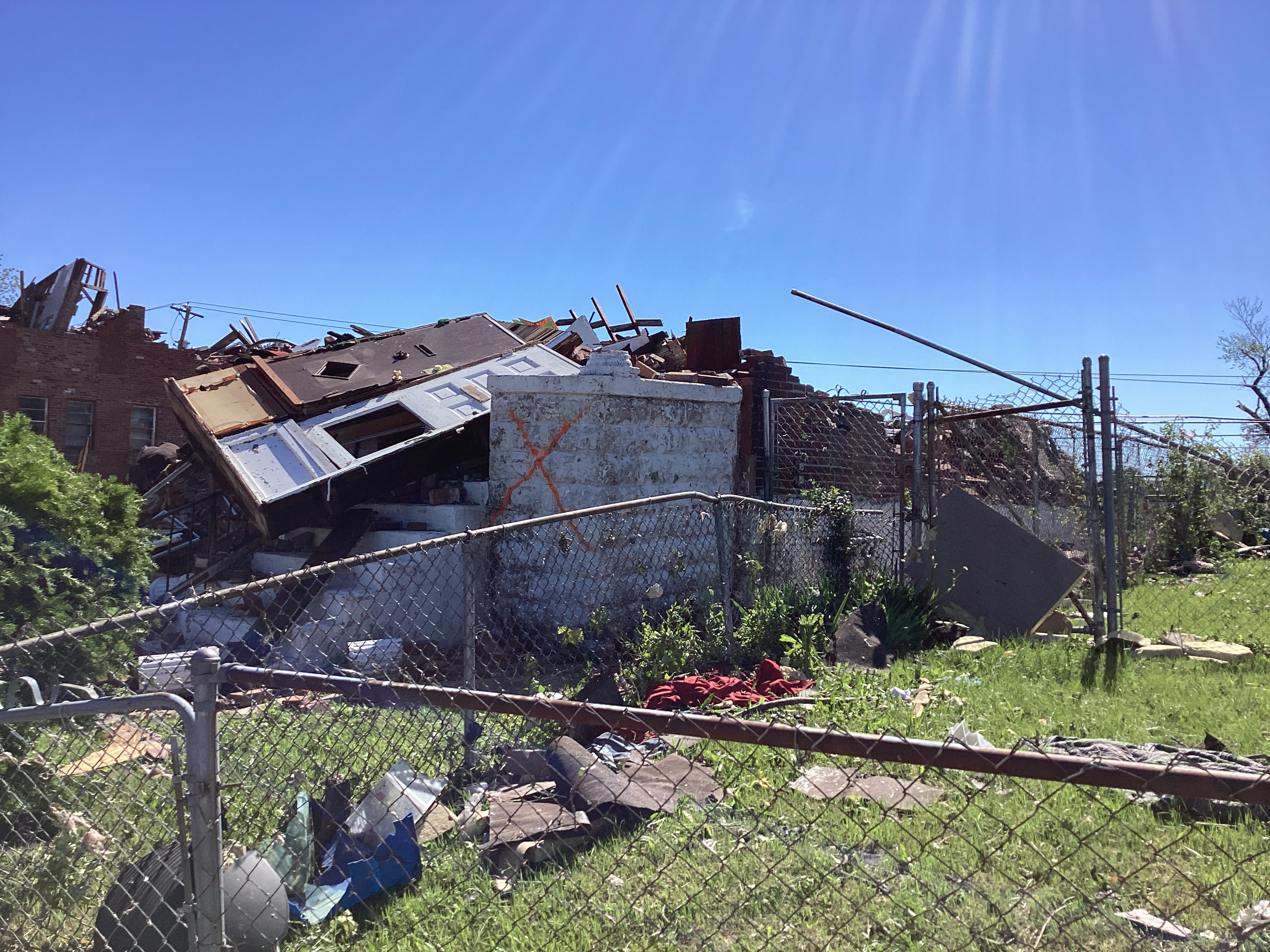
An old town home that was leveled at low-end EF3 intensity.

The tornado then narrowed somewhat, but again intensified to its peak intensity of mid-range EF3 for the second time as it moved through the Greater Ville neighborhood, flattening multiple brick townhouses along North Newstead Avenue. Beyond this point, the tornado weakened, but continued to cause widespread EF2 damage with other brick townhouses and homes collapsing or heavily damaged, with roofs removed and exterior walls knocked down; many trees were damaged, and power poles were snapped as well. Around this time, the tornado warning for the area was upgraded to a Particularly dangerous situation tornado warning due to radar confirming the presence of debris being lofted by the tornado. Along Natural Bridge Avenue (Route 115), a tall flagpole was heavily damaged before the tornado moved into the O'Fallon neighborhood just west of Fairground Park at EF2 intensity. More brick townhouses, other homes, businesses, and churches were heavily damaged and had shattered windows, and power poles and trees were snapped. This included some brick townhouses that collapsed at O'Fallon Park. The tornado continued to narrow, but remained at EF2 intensity as it crossed I-70 into the North Riverfront neighborhood, damaging multiple warehouses and snapping power poles as it moved through an industrial area in a train yard along BNSF Railway's Hannibal Subdivision before crossing the Mississippi River into Madison County, Illinois. The tornado then began to quickly narrow and weakened to EF1 intensity as it reached the Mississippi River.

=== Dissipation in Madison County, Illinois ===
The rapidly narrowing tornado then entered Madison County, Illinois on a northeastward trajectory at high-end EF1 intensity as it continued across the Mississippi River. It first moved over Gabaret Island, snapping and uprooting trees and snapping tree branches. The tornado then entered the west side of Granite City as the mesocyclone produced another tornado (rated EF1) in Granite City itself. This tornado struck residential areas as it moved across IL 3, damaging the roofs of homes, along with a manufactured home and an outbuilding, snapping tree branches, and snapping or uprooting trees. Similar damage continued to occur until the tornado occluded to the north-northeast as the new tornado became the dominant circulation in the storm, causing this tornado to quickly dissipate at the Kraft Heinz Granite City warehouse northwest of Granite City at 2:53 pm CDT.

=== Mechanism ===
The tornado was on the ground for 14 minutes, had a path length of 12.29 miles (19.78 km), was 3,168 yards (2,897 m; 1.800 mi) at its largest width, producing the widest tornado in St. Louis since reliable observations began in 1950, and moved at an average speed of 52.7 mph (84.8 km/h). The survey noted that the tornado may have consisted of multiple circulations. The tornado was likely caused by a very strong rear-flank downdraft surge, which was cited as a reason it occurred further north than where forecasters anticipated most tornadic activity to occur. As of the National Weather Service's updated damage assessment, it is apparent that the mesocyclone produced two separate tornadoes, in which the first tornado lifted slightly north of Granite City, and the second tornado touched down just south of that point.

=== Non-tornadic effects ===
Within Forest Park, the Saint Louis Zoo had 10,000 guests on-site when the storm struck, but all survived without injuries. 95% of the zoo's animals were recalled to the shelter. Although the tornado did not hit the zoo, its rear flank downdraft winds inflicted damage to the butterfly enclosure, in addition to other exhibits. The Harlem Tap Room bar, with 20 people inside, also collapsed, but no fatalities occurred there. This damage was also likely caused by the rear flank downdraft, as it was outside of the tornado's damage path.

=== Casualties ===
The National Weather Service stated in its initial tornado damage survey that five people were killed in the tornado, in addition to a further 38 who were non-fatally injured. The death toll was later revised down to four, with one death attributed to a non-tornadic wind gust from the same storm.

Name	Age	Type of structure	Location	Additional notes	Reference
Deloris Holmes	70	Permanent home	North St. Louis	Holmes was killed when the roof was ripped off their three-story family home.	
Rena Lyles	60	Permanent home	Fountain Park	Lyles was attempting to shelter with her family when a dresser fell on her, followed shortly by the collapse of the entire house.	
Patricia Ann Penelton	74	Church	Centennial Christian Church in Fountain Park	Penelton was killed in the collapse of the Centennial Christian Church.	
Larry Patrick	82	Permanent home	O'Fallon neighborhood	Patrick was in an exterior room on the lowest floor of his house when the tornado struck, and was found dead by search and rescue crews.	
Juan Baltazar	48	Motor vehicle	Grand Drive in Carondelet Park	Baltazar, a food truck operator, was crushed by a falling tree while driving a truck on Grand Drive. While this death was caused by the same storm as the St. Louis tornado and initially attributed to the tornado itself, it was later attributed to non-tornadic wind to the south of St. Louis.	

== Aftermath ==
=== Immediate response ===
At the Centennial Christian Church, which suffered a complete collapse with multiple people trapped under rubble, a call to the 911 emergency number was redirected to a non-emergency hotline. Although a city fire department, Engine House No. 28, was only a one-minute drive away, the tornado had felled a significant amount of trees onto roadways, and the first to respond to the collapse was reverend Dietra Wise Baker. Baker called the St. Louis County 911, though was told that the call must be taken by St. Louis City 911, which was "overloaded", and their call would not go through; the first notification of the collapse to emergency management was made by direct contact to individuals part of St. Louis Metropolitan Police Department and Fire Department.

Between 2:40 and 7:00 p.m. on May 16, police in St. Louis received 334 calls in total, in what KTVI described as a surge in emergency response activity following the storm.

=== Damage ===
The tornado damaged 5,000 structures and caused an estimated $1.6 billion in property damage. 80 volunteer structural engineers affiliated with the Missouri Structural Assessment and Visual Evaluation coalition converged in St. Louis the first week to assess the habitability of homes across the city, placing stickers on structures based on their integrity. Structures marked with red stickers are unsafe to occupy, while those with yellow stickers should be entered with caution. The stickers are non-binding and are meant for informative purposes only. Governor of Missouri, Mike Kehoe, authorized a $100 million in aid for St. Louis recovery efforts. Federal aid has been requested but is still pending acceptance.

=== Federal response ===
The Federal Emergency Management Agency (FEMA) dispatched two teams to St. Louis following the tornado, focusing on Greater Ville and Kingsway East. On May 21, Missouri governor Mike Kehoe announced he would be asking President Trump for federal disaster aid following the tornado. Kehoe relayed that FEMA had called the amount of residential destruction in St. Louis the largest the organization had surveyed since the Joplin tornado in 2011. Yet, as of May 23, 2025, no federal funds have been allocated to support the city’s recovery. A fire later occurred in a tornado-affected area of St. Louis, and one firefighter was injured non-critically while responding.

=== Siren activation controversy ===
Sirens across northern St. Louis failed to sound during the tornado. This was attributed by emergency management and city officials to a lack of organization, as the city's emergency management commissioner was attending an off-site workshop and other emergency staff were unable to activate sirens themselves, with a call to the city's fire department being described as an ambiguous request that was not actioned. Sarah Russell, the city's emergency management commissioner, was placed on administrative leave following this incident. KSDK reported in response to this that city emergency management had previously requested more funding, as they had been receiving only 0.2% of the city's yearly resources, seven times less than some comparable cities such as Kansas City and Chicago.

== See also ==
- Weather of 2025
- St. Louis tornado history
- List of costliest tornadoes in the Americas
- List of F3, EF3, and IF3 tornadoes (2020–present)
