= Tornado outbreak of May 15–16, 2025 =

Tornado outbreak in the United States

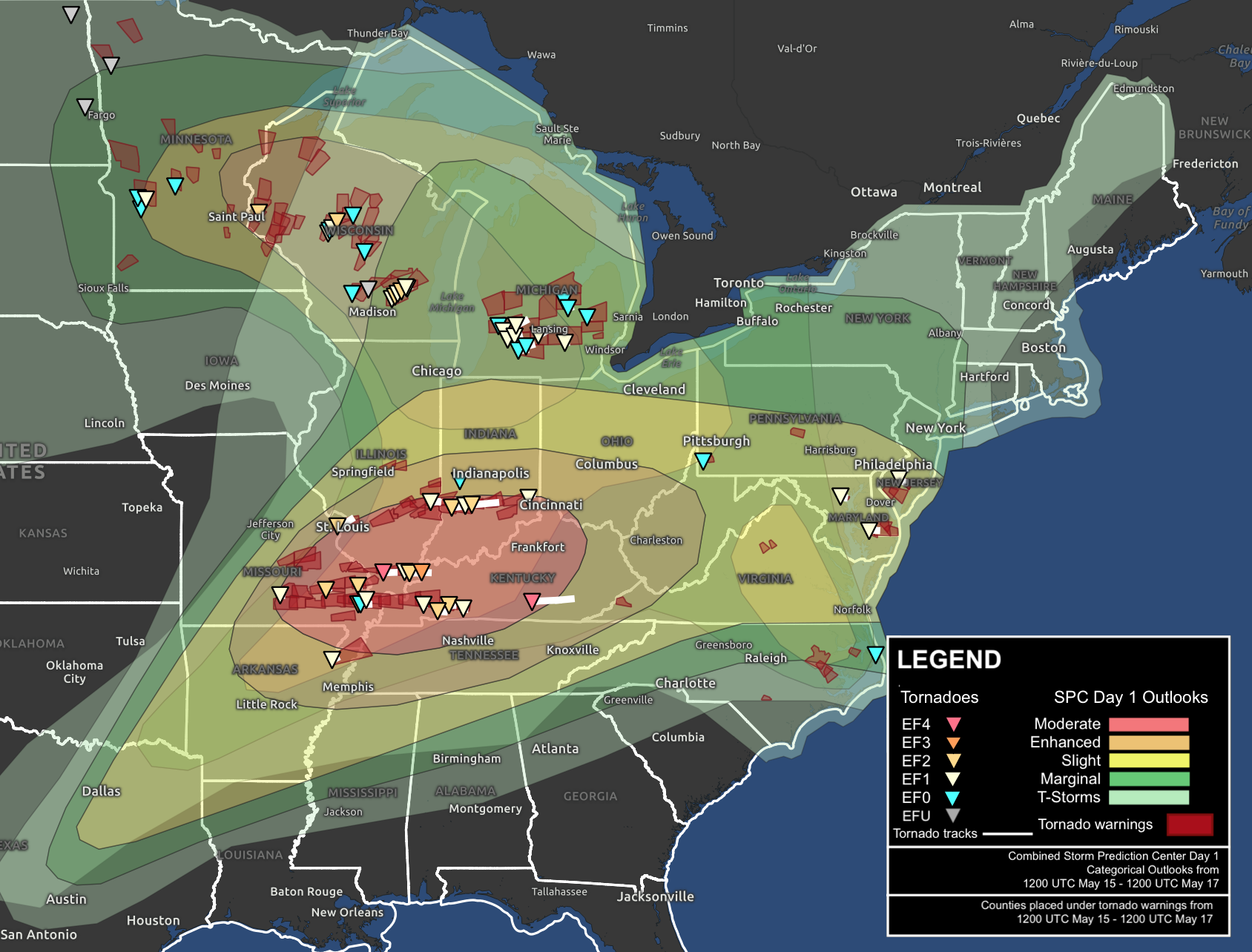
- Map of tornadoes and counties placed under tornado warnings from May 15–16

Meteorological history
- Duration: May 15–16, 2025

Tornado outbreak
- Tornadoes: 62
- Max. rating: EF4 tornado
- Duration: 1 day, 5 hours, 51 minutes
- Highest winds: Tornadic – 190 mph (310 km/h) (Marion, Illinois EF4 on May 16)
- Highest gusts: Non-tornadic – 107 mph (172 km/h) at the Saint Louis Zoo, St. Louis, Missouri on May 16
- Largest hail: 4.50 inches (114 mm) near La Center, Kentucky on May 16

Extratropical cyclone
- Lowest pressure: 984 hPa (mbar); 29.06 inHg

Overall effects
- Fatalities: 26 (+4 non-tornadic)
- Injuries: 168+
- Damage: $5.9 billion (2025 USD)
- Areas affected: Central United States, Ohio Valley
- Power outages: 600,000+ customers
- Part of the Tornadoes of 2025

A destructive tornado outbreak occurred across the Midwest and Ohio Valley on May 15–16, 2025, producing 62 tornadoes and causing dozens of fatalities and billions in damages. The event occurred as a negatively-tilted trough moved into the Upper Midwest. The Storm Prediction Center (SPC) first issued an enhanced risk on May 15 for portions of the Great Lakes and Upper Midwest. Several tornadoes, mostly weak, touched down that day across the states of Wisconsin and Minnesota as embedded storms within a squall line moved through, causing damaging wind gusts.

The most significant tornadic activity would take place in the Ohio Valley the following day. On May 15, the SPC issued a moderate risk of severe weather for portions of Arkansas, Tennessee, Missouri, Illinois, Indiana, Ohio, and Kentucky, effective the following day. Several dozen tornadoes were confirmed on the afternoon and evening of May 16, many of them strong to violent, including a large EF3 tornado that struck the Greater St. Louis area, killing four people, and was the strongest in the area since a violent tornado in 2011. Later that evening, a violent EF4 tornado also prompted the issuance of a tornado emergency for portions of Williamson and Saline counties in Illinois, injuring 7 people. An EF3 tornado in Scott County, Missouri resulted in two fatalities. A strong EF2 tornado in Linton killed one person. A violent, long-tracked EF4 tornado also struck the cities of Somerset and London, Kentucky, killing 19 people and was the deadliest of the outbreak.

There were 26 tornadic deaths, as well as four non-tornadic deaths, associated with this outbreak, primarily from the St. Louis and London tornadoes on May 16, and it was the deadliest in the state of Kentucky since 2021. Additionally, at least 168 injuries occurred as a result of the outbreak. With a total of 62 confirmed tornadoes, the outbreak received a score of 57 on the Outbreak Intensity Score (OIS), classifying it as a "major" outbreak. The outbreak caused approximately $5.9 billion (2025 USD) in damages, making it one of the costliest on record.

== Meteorological synopsis ==
=== May 15 ===
==== Forecast ====
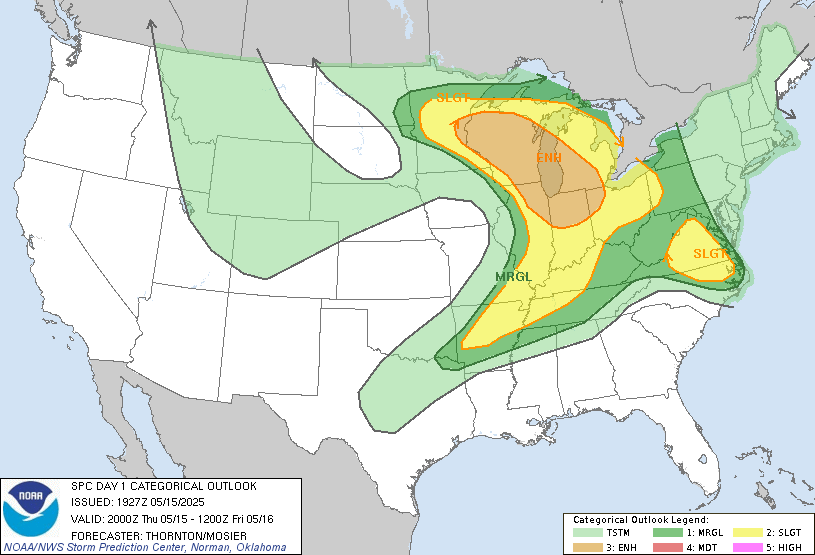
Storm Prediction Center Day 1 convective outlook on May 15 showing an enhanced risk for the Upper Midwest

On the morning of May 15, the Storm Prediction Center (SPC) forecast an enhanced (3/5) risk of severe weather over Minnesota, Wisconsin, Illinois, Michigan, Indiana, and Ohio. A negatively tilted mid-level atmospheric trough was expected to move northeast across the Upper Midwest, which would cause jet streaks to move eastward over the Ozarks and northeastward over the upper Missouri River valley. Large ascent produced by the system was expected to produce a large warm sector throughout much of the Great Lakes and Ohio Valley regions. A surface cyclone was expected to develop over the Dakotas, anchoring a potent warm front that would move north into Wisconsin and a cold front that would move east over the middle and upper Mississippi Valley. Ahead of the cold front would be an area of moderate instability and moist air with dewpoints near 70 °F (21 °C), with strong initial wind shear expected to support the development of supercells. Further east, around Milwaukee in southeastern Wisconsin and Chicago in northeastern Illinois, RAP model soundings anticipated moderate MLCAPE values of 2000 J/kg, shear in the lowest 6 km (3.7 mi) of the atmosphere of 35–40 kn (46 mph; 74 km/h), and mid-level lapse rates of 7.5 °C/km, in addition to strong storm-relative helicity values of 250–300 m^{2}/s^{2}, which would support severe hazards if mature supercells spread over the area.

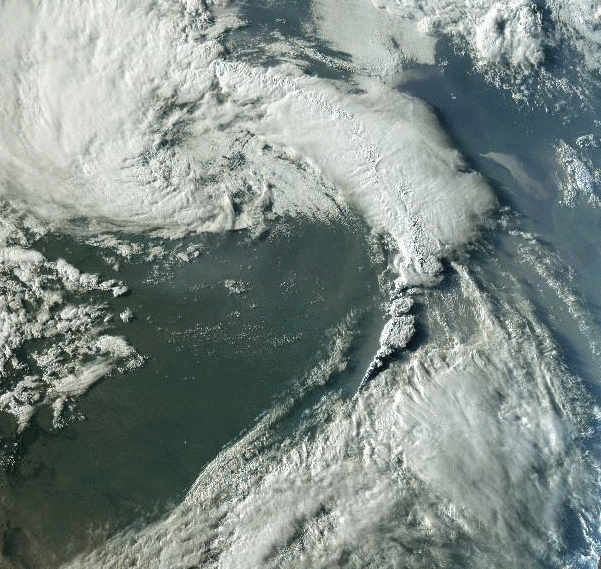
The cyclone responsible for the outbreak on May 15

The severe weather forecast was predicted to start near the surface cyclone in the upper Mississippi Valley, with individual storms expected to organize into discrete supercells as they exploited the region's conducive deep-layer shear values. This was expected to become a broken line of severe convection, which would move east-northeastward into northern Illinois and eastern Wisconsin as the day progressed. The region was expected to see supercells, some of which might bring strong downburst winds, large hail—up to 2 in (5.1 cm) in the strongest storms—and moderate to strong tornadoes. The broken line was expected to organize into a more linear storm with embedded supercells that might produce tornados and wind gusts exceeding 75 mph (121 km/h) at the leading edge of the line, and hail as the line moved into northern Indiana and Michigan's lower peninsula.

After northern parts of the line moved onto Lake Michigan and as the mesoscale convective system approached landfall onto Michigan's lower peninsula, forecasters noted that shear profiles from Grand Rapids would remain conducive to strong wind gusts and potentially tornadoes, also noting the possibility of embedded mesovortices or rear-inflow jets as inciting factors for either. Throughout the late evening, the system would maintain itself through strong deep-layer shear and higher boundary-level dewpoints, with recorded wind gusts reaching 70 mph (110 km/h) occurring by 9:47 p.m. CDT. Further south over northern Arkansas, existing storms began moving into a destabilized area of the region, though forecasters noted that storms might not intensify because of the presence of substantial convective inhibition in the region.

=== May 16 ===
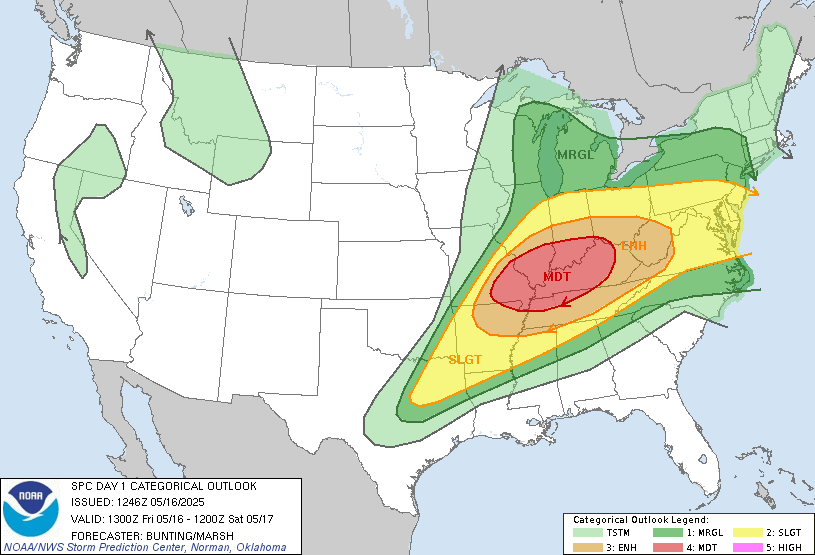
Storm Prediction Center outlook issued at 1300 UTC on May 16, 2025, outlining a moderate risk for the Ohio Valley

The Storm Prediction Center outlined a moderate (4/5) risk over much of the middle Mississippi and lower Ohio Valleys on May 16, with the greatest risk over southeastern Missouri, far northeastern Arkansas, northwestern Tennessee, southern Illinois and Indiana, far southwestern Ohio, and much of Kentucky. The upper-level low centered over the border of North Dakota and Minnesota was expected to move eastward into the middle Mississippi Valley. Following persisting convection from the previous day, a warm front would sweep over a large region from Missouri to the Ohio and Tennessee Valley regions. Over this region, the atmosphere was expected to sharply destabilize, with MLCAPE values exceeding 2500 J/kg, strong mid-level flow, and deep-layer shear that might exceed 50 knots expected to help develop and intensify severe weather.

Severe convection the previous day had persisted into the morning in northeastern Arkansas through eastern Kentucky, which was expected to move east into a destabilizing environment in West Virginia and western Virginia that afternoon, though the longevity of this system was uncertain.

== Confirmed tornadoes ==
Confirmed tornadoes by Enhanced Fujita rating
| EFU | EF0 | EF1 | EF2 | EF3 | EF4 | EF5 | Total |
|---|---|---|---|---|---|---|---|
| 4 | 16 | 25 | 11 | 3 | 2 | 0 | 61 |

=== Clayton–St. Louis, Missouri/Granite City, Illinois ===
Clayton–St. Louis, Missouri/Granite City, Illinois
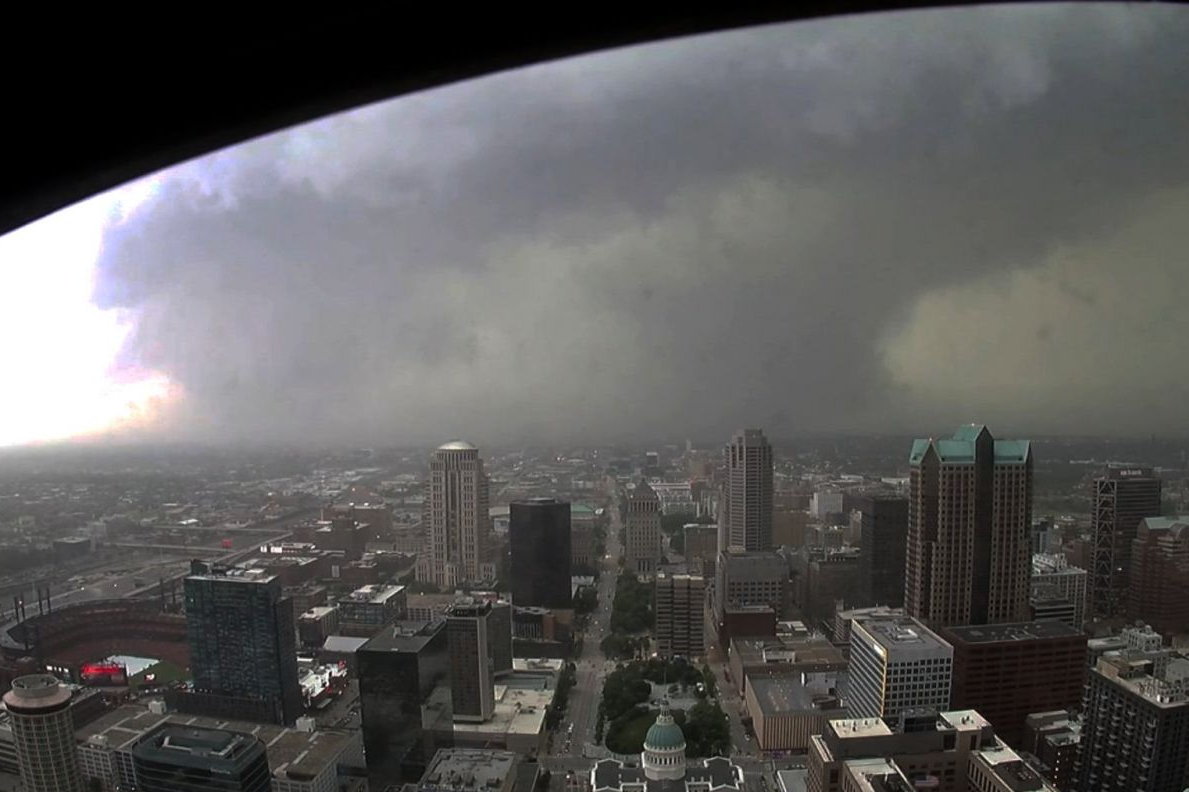
- Gateway Arch CCTV footage of the tornado over St. Louis

Meteorological history
- Formed: May 16, 2025, 2:39 p.m. CDT (UTC–05:00)
- Dissipated: May 16, 2025, 2:53 p.m. CDT (UTC–05:00)
- Duration: 14 minutes

EF3 tornado
- on the Enhanced Fujita scale
- Highest winds: 152 mph (245 km/h)

Overall effects
- Fatalities: 4 (+1 non tornadic)
- Injuries: 38
- Damage: $1.6 billion (2025 USD)

This extremely large, fast-moving, and deadly tornado caused significant damage to portions of the Greater St. Louis area. The tornado first touched down at 2:39 pm CDT in Clayton just east of I-170 in St. Louis County, Missouri. Upon touching down, the tornado immediately reached EF2 intensity as it moved eastward-southeastward through Clayton, damaging apartment buildings, homes, and low-rise buildings, uprooting trees, and snapping tree branches. Turning east-northeastward, it then caused widespread EF1 damage to trees, power poles, and residences at Fontbonne University; one area of EF2 damage was noted with some power poles that were snapped. The tornado then entered the City of St. Louis, where the tornado sirens failed to sound before the tornado hit as the emergency manager who was supposed to sound them was at training session and away from her office while the back-up button at the fire department was broken and they only received one directive to sound them, but it was garbled and ambiguous.

The tornado continued to produce widespread tree damage as it moved into the city with the St. Louis Zoo also sustaining damage from the storm's rear flank downdraft. The tornado then began to intensify quickly and reached EF2 intensity after crossing Forest Park Parkway. It heavily damaged multiple apartment buildings, damaged homes, shattered windows, and snapped and uprooted numerous trees. In the Central West End and Academy neighborhoods, more homes, churches, mid-rise buildings, traffic lights, power poles, and trees were heavily damaged. Northeast of there, the strengthening tornado blew out the walls and windows and partially and completely removed the roofs of several businesses and brick townhouses, and caused widespread damage to trees, power poles, and traffic lights. Part of the Centennial Christian Church, with three people inside, collapsed with one person later dying from their injuries. Other churches had windows shattered and exterior damage as well. Two areas of low-end EF3 damage occurred on the northwest side of the tornado's path, with a strip mall being partially destroyed and a brick townhouse being flattened; the neighboring brick townhouse was damaged at EF2 intensity.

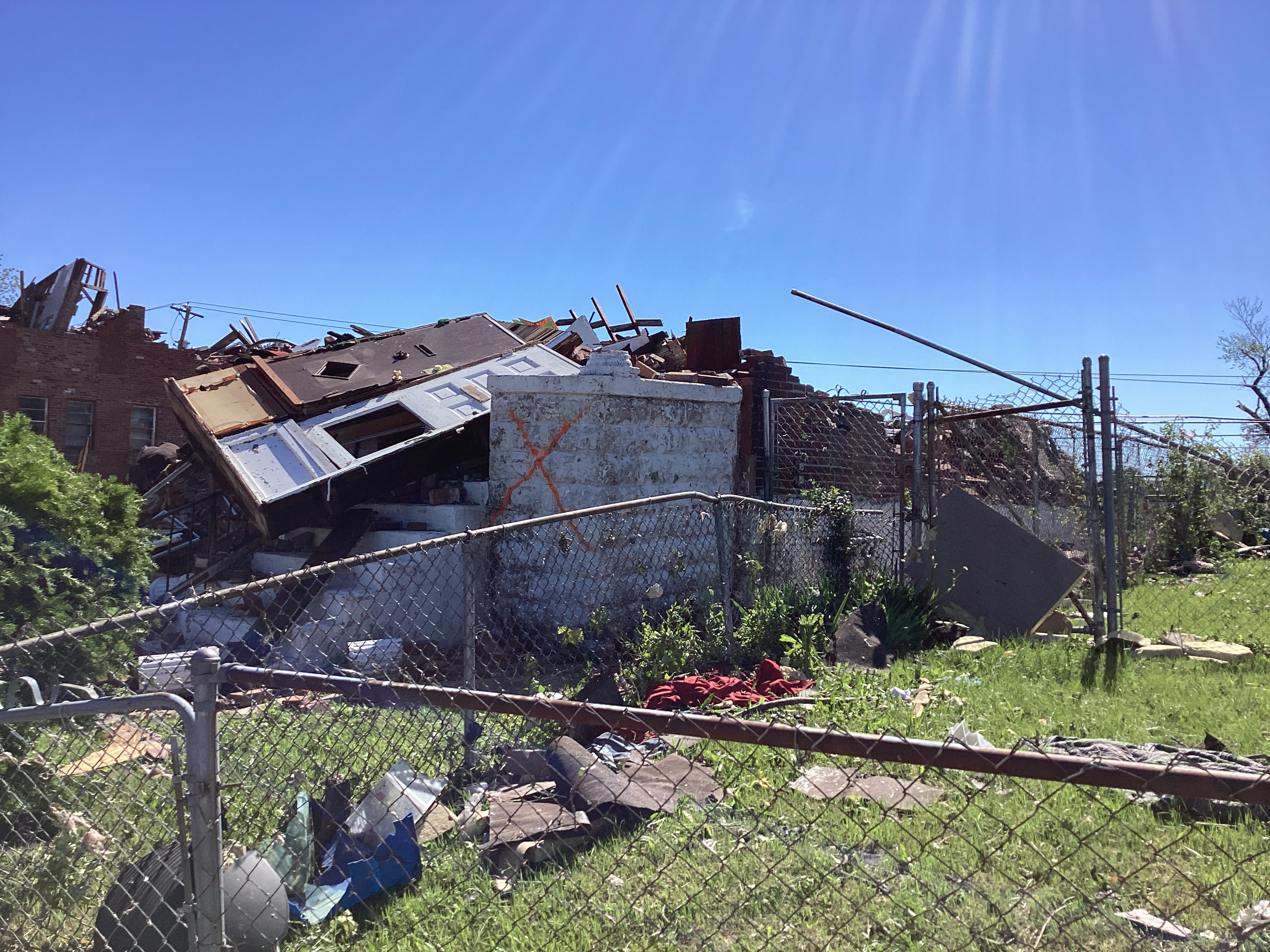
Low-end EF3 damage to family residence in St. Louis.

The now nearly mile-wide tornado then moved through the northwestern part of St. Louis at EF2 intensity. Many brick townhouses and other homes collapsed or were heavily damaged, with roofs removed and exterior walls knocked down; many trees were damaged, and power poles were snapped. The Harlem Tap Room bar, with 20 people inside, also collapsed, but no fatalities occurred there. This damage was also likely caused by the rear flank downdraft as it was outside of the tornado's damage path. The tornado peaked at mid-range EF3 intensity along North Newstand Avenue, flattening multiple brick townhouses. Another brick townhome on Marcus Avenue was also flattened at EF3 intensity, and a church nearby had its roof partially removed and its steeple knocked off. Continuing east-northeastward, the tornado heavily damaged a flagpole as it crossed Route 115 before heavily damaging more brick townhouses, including some that collapsed, other homes, businesses, and churches were heavily damaged and had shattered windows, and power poles and trees were snapped. The tornado then crossed I-70, damaging multiple warehouses and snapping power poles as it moved through an industrial area in a train yard before crossing the Mississippi River into Madison County, Illinois, causing additional EF1 damags to structures before dissipating at 2:53 p.m. CDT.

The tornado was on the ground for 14 minutes, had a path length of 12.29 miles (19.78 km), was 3,168 yards (2,897 m; 1.800 mi) at its largest width, and moved at an average speed of 55 mph (89 km/h). The mayor of St. Louis confirmed that five people were killed and the tornado caused $1.6 billion in damage; one of the deaths was later determined to have been caused by wind damage and not the tornado itself, leaving the death toll from the tornado at four. Ameren reported more than 100,000 customers without power in the city. Additionally, 38 people were injured by the tornado.

=== Shawan–Crowder–Blodgett, Missouri ===
Shawan–Crowder–Blodgett, Missouri
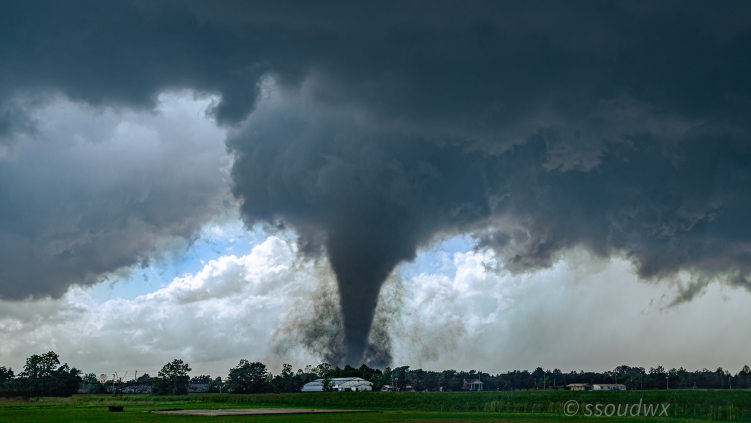
- The tornado near peak intensity south of Blodgett, Missouri

Meteorological history
- Formed: May 16, 2025, 3:54 p.m. CDT (UTC–05:00)
- Dissipated: May 16, 2025, 4:15 p.m. CDT (UTC-05:00)
- Duration: 21 minutes

EF3 tornado
- on the Enhanced Fujita scale
- Highest winds: 152 mph (245 km/h)

Overall effects
- Fatalities: 2
- Injuries: 10
- Damage: $15.2 million (2025 USD)

This narrow but intense tornado touched down over the small community of Shawan in eastern Stoddard County at 3:52 p.m. CDT and moved just south of due east along Route Y. It first caused EF0 damage to the roof of a home, which also had a tree partially fall on it, before snapping trees at EF1 intensity while also inflicting EF0 damage to an outbuilding. The tornado wobbled southeastward and intensified, unroofing a one-story home along County Highway 585 at low-end EF2 strength. Afterwards, the tornado began a more erratic eastward motion as it crossed into Scott County, damaging power poles, flipping irrigation pivots, and snapping and uprooting trees at EF0-EF1 strength. The tornado then struck the community of Crowder, destroying an outbuilding, collapsing part of another, and snapping more trees.

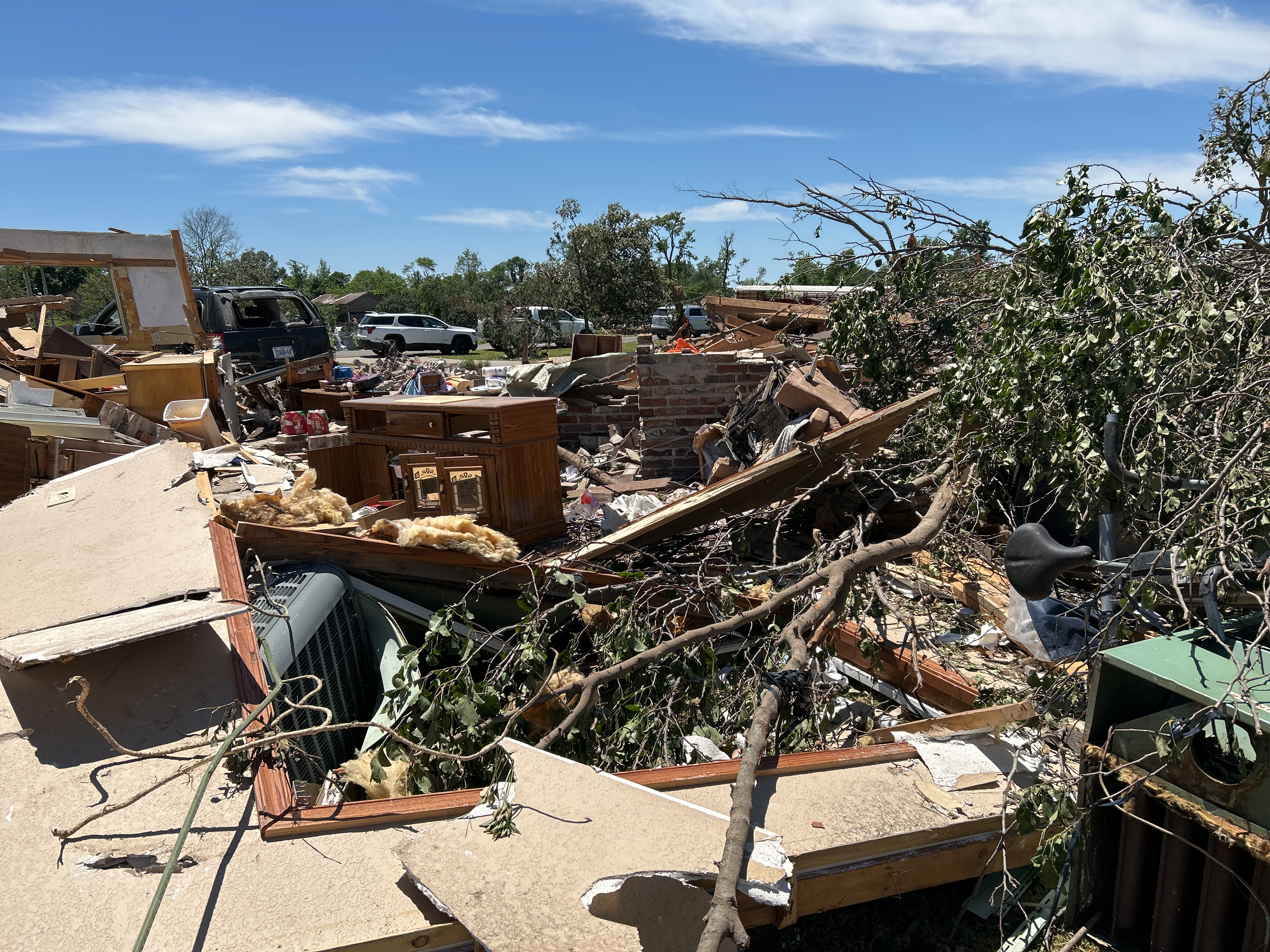
A home southwest of Blodgett, Missouri, mostly leveled at mid-range EF3 intensity. One fatality was located here.

The tornado continued to flip irrigation pivots before crossing US 61, blowing down 10 new power poles high-end EF1 intensity. After passing through an open field, the tornado snapped trees in a wooded area before it reached its peak intensity as it moved along Sloanville Drive southwest of Blodgett. A mobile home along this road was obliterated and swept away, with the debris left in a pile next to the foundation at low-end EF3 intensity; a home nearby was also destroyed, with most of its walls knocked down at mid-range EF3 intensity. A fatality was confirmed in both structures. EF1-EF2 damage also occurred with another mobile home and outbuildings being destroyed, other homes and mobile homes being heavily damaged with roofs partially to completely removed and exterior walls knocked down, and wooden power poles and trees being snapped. Vehicles were also damaged, and debris was strewn throughout the area.

Continuing just north of due east, the tornado then moved through neighborhoods south of Blodgett and crossed I-55 at EF2 intensity. Multiple homes in this area were heavily damaged, with roofs removed and exterior walls knocked down. One home was shifted off its foundation, another had its second story completely removed, and a third collapsed. A family of four sheltered in the hallway of the third home; an elderly woman was injured, but everyone survived. A business was also destroyed, and trees were snapped or uprooted, including one tree that fell on a home. Along County Highway 524, more trees were snapped a garage door was blown in. The tornado then turned east-southeastward, removing the roof and knocking down the exterior walls of another home and destroying a large barn at high-end EF2 intensity, killing two dogs and two horses at this location. It also caused minor damage to another home. The tornado then steadily weakened, blowing shingles off the roofs of homes, uprooting trees, and snapping tree branches before dissipating just west of the village of Diehlstadt at 4:15 p.m. CDT.

The tornado was on the ground for 21 minutes and had a path length of 16.35 miles (26.31 km). At its widest, the tornado was 200 yards (180 m). The tornado resulted in two fatalities and ten injuries, about 40–50 homes were heavily damaged, with 15 destroyed.

=== Linton–Switz City–Worthington, Indiana ===
Linton–Switz City–Worthington, Indiana
- The dusty tornado shortly after formation near Linton

Meteorological history
- Formed: May 16, 2025, 6:44 p.m. EDT (UTC–06:00)
- Dissipated: May 16, 2025, 7:06 p.m. EDT (UTC–06:00)
- Duration: 22 minutes

EF2 tornado
- on the Enhanced Fujita scale
- Highest winds: 128 mph (206 km/h)

Overall effects
- Fatalities: 1
- Injuries: 3
- Damage: $1.05 million (2025 USD)

A supercell rode along the warm front in west-central Indiana, before dropping this strong and deadly tornado in western Greene County, west-northwest of Linton at 6:44 p.m. EDT. The tornado initially caused EF0 damage to a barn right after touch down, but quickly began to intensify. After causing EF1 damage around 2.5 miles (4.0 km) into its journey, the tornado intensified and caused EF2 damage to an outbuilding along SR 54/SR 59, completely destroying the structure. The tornado continued tracking in an east-northeastern manner, weakening to EF1 intensity as it obliterated a barn and rolled a camper, before destroying it. Shortly after, the tornado regained EF2 intensity and caused considerable damage to another barn one home just north of Linton. Nearby, a 33-year old woman alongside three children near Linton were injured as a tree fell on top of their car. The woman ultimately succumbed to her wounds as emergency responders arrived on the scene.

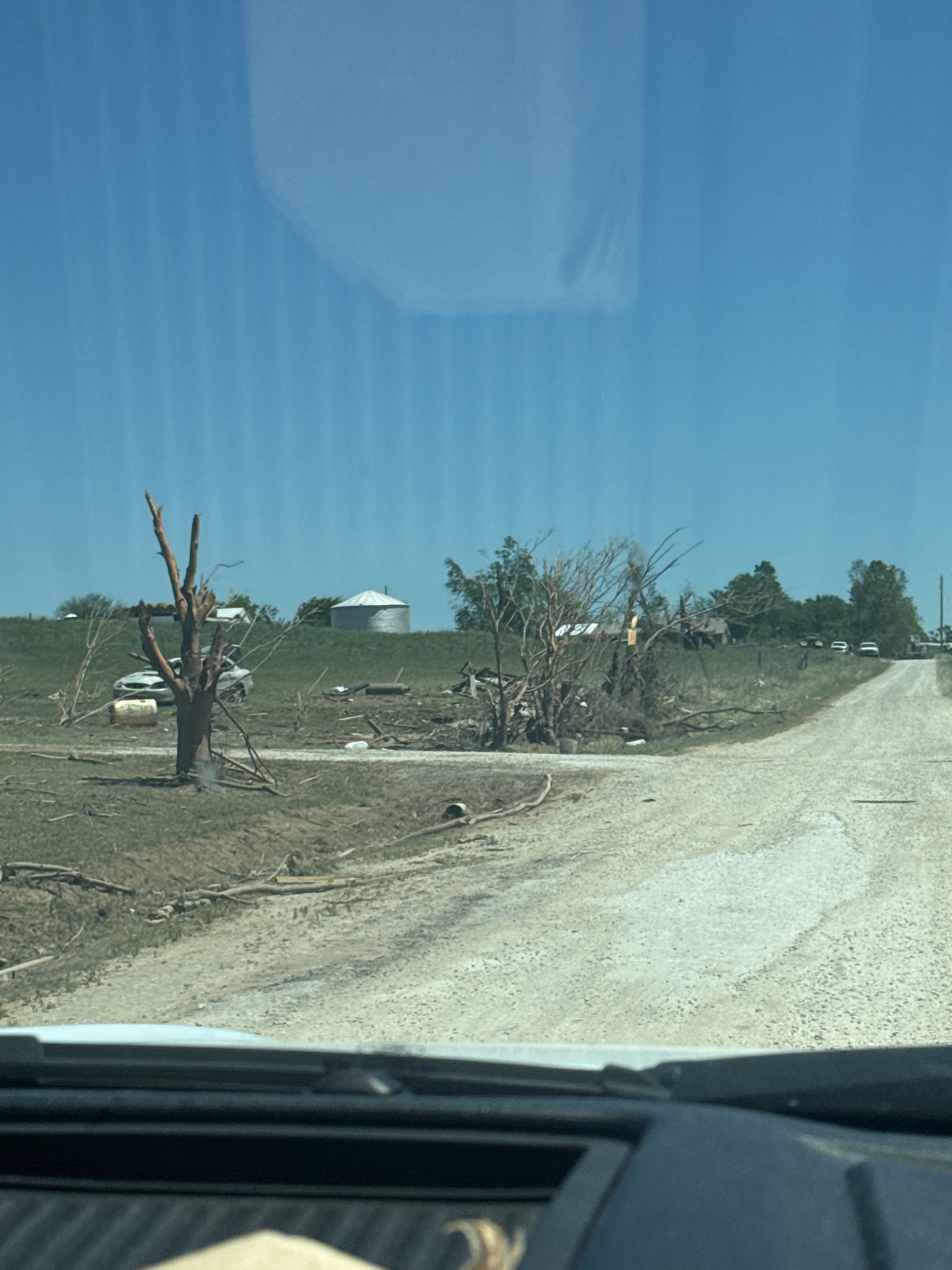
Major damage south of Worthington, Indiana.

The tornado would then leave Linton and become cloaked in copious amounts of dust as it traversed through farm fields, impacting many homes and farmsteads at EF2 intensity. One home in particular in this area on 295 North suffered high-end EF2 damage, with the southern side of the residence completely collapsed, while a barn on the property was destroyed as well. The strong tornado continued plowing through farmland, before impacting a farmstead on County Road 900 West where a manufactured home, and its debris were blown away from its concrete mounds. Occasional EF2 damage to trees and farm outbuildings as the tornado passed far north of Switz City and crossed SR 67 and US 231/SR 57. As the tornado passed south of Worthington, it began to cause more significant damage to properties, though at one farmstead along County Road 325 North, the tornado caused exceptional amounts of damage. Here, a home suffered several exterior wall collapses, with complete destruction of the garage. Many trees were stubbed and denuded, debris was strewn across some distances and fields were partially scoured. Another nearby, and anchored residence was completely destroyed and wiped off its foundation along 325 North. The tornado would continue to the east, producing its last area of EF2 damage to a large pole barn on County Road 200 West before dissipating at 7:06 p.m. EDT.

This tornado killed one person, and injured three others as it remained on the ground for 22 minutes. It tracked for 14.04 miles (22.60 km), and was 200 yards (180 m) wide across portions within Greene County. The parent supercell that produced this tornado persisted onwards as it continued east, dropping an EF1 tornado west of Solsberry before a significant, and long-tracked EF2 tornado moved through the southern side of Bloomington, Indiana.

=== Wolf Creek–Hudgens–Marion, Illinois ===
Wolf Creek–Hudgens–Marion, Illinois
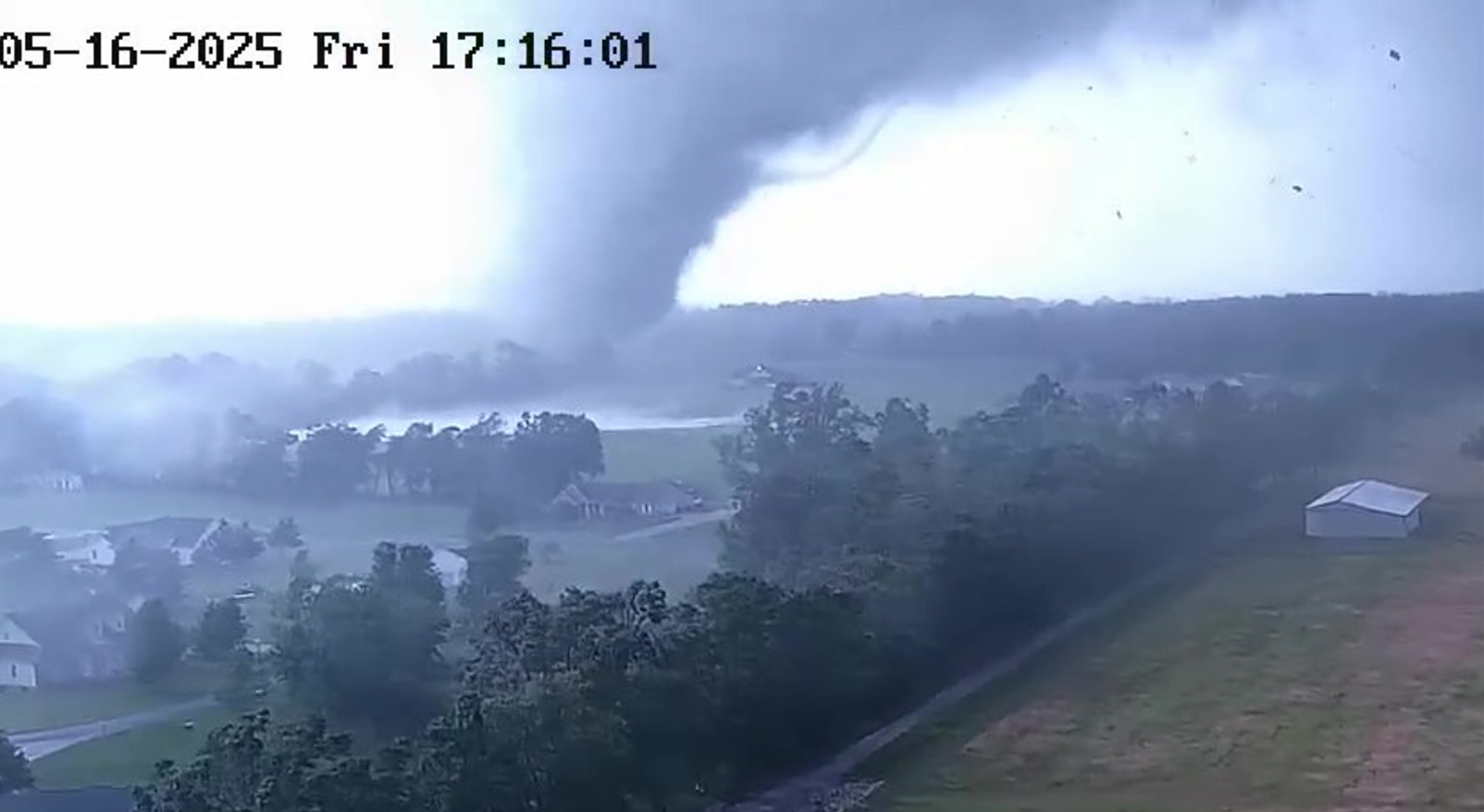
- The violent tornado seen from a tower camera south of Hudgens Road near Marion, Illinois

Meteorological history
- Formed: May 16, 2025, 6:15 p.m. CDT (UTC–05:00)
- Dissipated: May 16, 2025, 6:32 p.m. CDT (UTC-05:00)
- Duration: 17 minutes

EF4 tornado
- on the Enhanced Fujita scale
- Highest winds: 190 mph (310 km/h)

Overall effects
- Fatalities: 0
- Injuries: 7
- Damage: $25 million (2025 USD)

This violent, fast-moving tornado touched down along Grassy Road at 6:15 p.m. CDT northwest of Wolf Creek in Williamson County, initially causing mostly EF0 tree damage as it moved due east. Nearing IL 148, the tornado intensified to EF1 strength, destroying an outbuilding and heavily damaging a mobile home as it crossed the highway. The tornado then rapidly intensified and reached high-end EF3 intensity as it struck the USP Marion, a federal prison, where several staff housing buildings had their roofs removed and multiple exterior walls knocked down. At this point, the tornado warning for the storm was upgraded to a particularly dangerous situation tornado warning because radar had confirmed the presence of debris being lofted by the tornado. Continuing eastward at EF3 intensity, the tornado caused heavy tree damage, including some trees that were stubbed and debarked, as it approached and crossed I-57, and snapped a large double wooden post transmission line at its base. The tornado then struck Hudgens, snapping trees and damaging several homes as it crossed IL 37, including at least one home that was leveled and at least one other one that had exterior walls knocked down. The tornado then weakened to EF2 intensity as it continued eastward, heavily damaging homes and mobile homes as it crossed Market Road and Andrew Road. At this time, a new tornado warning with a rare tornado emergency tag was issued for the storm when a large debris ball showed up on radar.

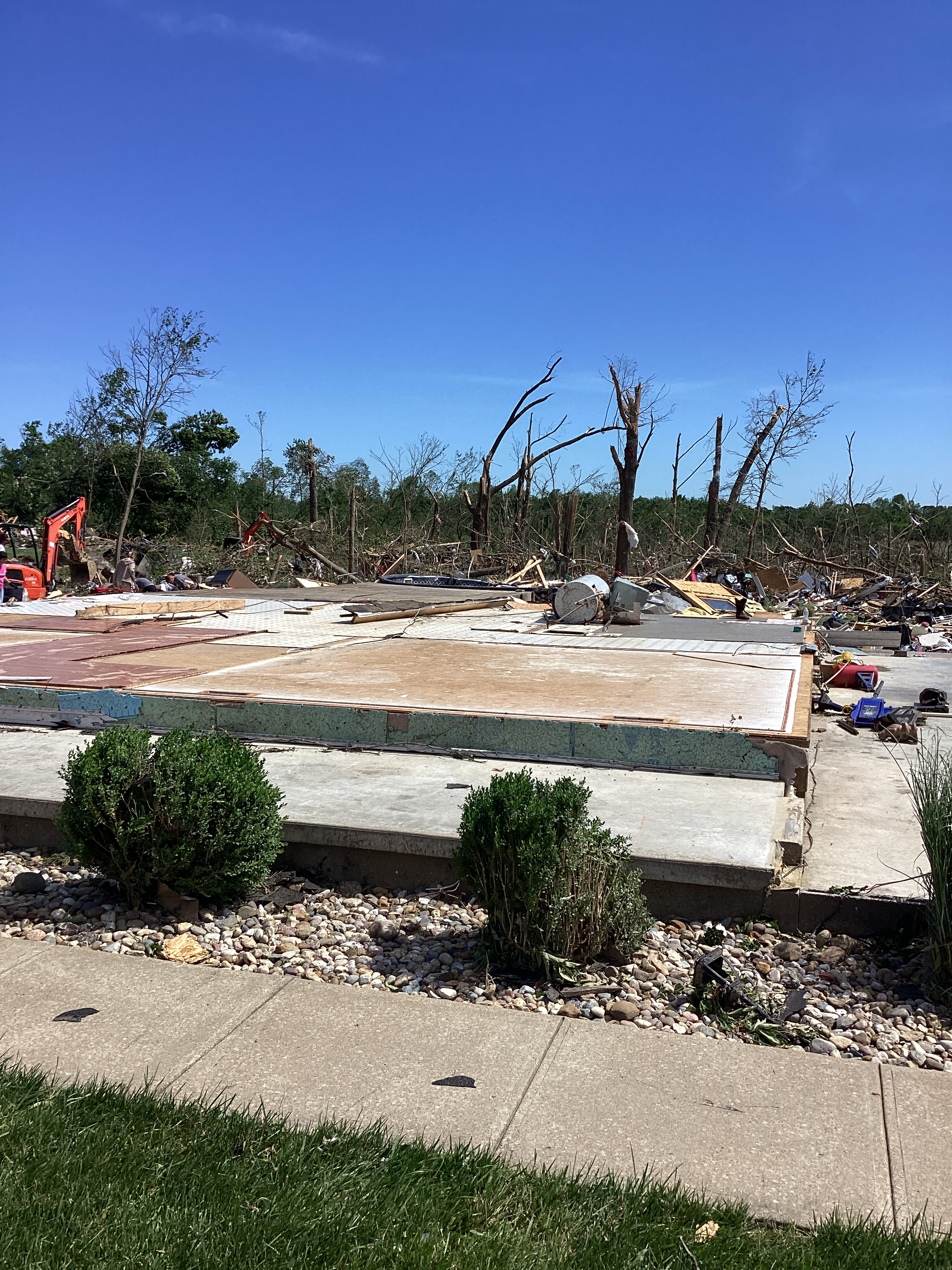
A two-story home south of Marion, Illinois swept away at high-end EF4 intensity.

South of Marion, the tornado abruptly intensified again and became violent, reaching its peak intensity on Kyler Court, sweeping a two-story house off its elevated floor system and debarking and stubbing hundreds of trees behind the home. This home had a crawlspace foundation, where the home sat on top an elevated floor system. Sill plates were anchored to the concrete foundation by bolts, and the floor joists were toe-nailed to the sill plates. The failure occurred at the weak connection between the floor joists and wall bottom plate, where straight nails were used. These connections are deemed to be well-constructed, but just slightly below the 'expected' threshold of 200 mph (320 km/h) for degree of damage 10. The damage to the home, along with the extreme tree damage nearby led to a high-end EF4 rating with winds of 190 mph (310 km/h) being assigned to this home. Another home nearby was almost completely leveled, other homes had roofs removed and exterior walls knocked down, and an outbuilding was destroyed, with numerous trees also falling on the debris from the structure. The tornado then weakened somewhat but remained intense as it crossed Wards Mill Road at mid-range EF3 intensity. Two homes were leveled, with an injury occurring in the second one, other homes had roofs removed and exterior walls knocked down, outbuildings were demolished, four wooden power poles were snapped, and trees were shredded. The tornado then weakened further, but remained strong, continuing eastward at EF2 intensity through more rural and wooden areas. Most of the damage along this portion of the path was trees being snapped, although it also destroyed an outbuilding, heavily damaged a home, and snapped power poles as well. The tornado reintensified to high-end EF3 strength again as it crossed IL 166, sweeping away an unanchored home, leveling a nailed-down home, and removing the roof and knocking down some exterior walls of a third home. Afterwards, the tornado steadily weakened, destroying an outbuilding at EF2 intensity and then causing increasingly sporadic tree damage before lifting at 6:32 p.m. CDT.

The tornado was on the ground for 17 minutes, had a path length of 16.28 miles (26.20 km), and was 900 yards (820 m) at its largest width. Seven people were injured. The storm would remain tornado warned for four more hours as it continued eastward, producing three additional tornadoes before weakening below severe limits over northwestern Hardin County, Kentucky. County officials instituted an overnight curfew for unsafe travel conditions. Volunteer centers, including two Red Cross shelters, opened in Marion the following day.

=== Whittle–Somerset–Mount Victory–London, Kentucky ===
Whittle–Somerset–Mount Victory–London, Kentucky
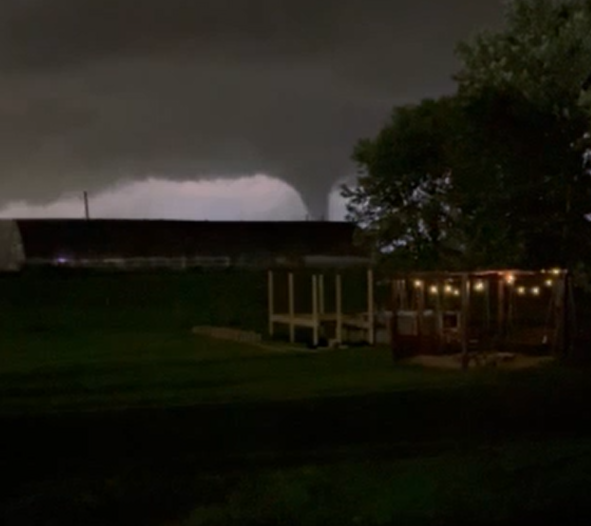
- A photograph of the tornado in within Somerset, Kentucky being illuminated by a lightning flash

Meteorological history
- Formed: May 16, 2025, 10:27 p.m. EDT (UTC–04:00)
- Dissipated: May 16, 2025, 11:56 p.m. EDT (UTC-04:00)
- Duration: 1 hour, 29 minutes

EF4 tornado
- on the Enhanced Fujita scale
- Highest winds: 170 mph (270 km/h)

Overall effects
- Fatalities: 19
- Injuries: 108
- Damage: $350 million (2025 USD) (Laurel County only)

This large, long-tracked, and devastating tornado first touched down in Russell County northeast of Jamestown at 10:26 p.m. EDT. At the touchdown point, the tornado damaged the roof of an outbuilding as it started eastward and crossed KY 619. The tornado then shattered windows and inflicted roof and siding damage to a home before crossing Caney Creek, uprooting trees on the hillsides on both sides of the creek. The tornado then turned east-northeastward, rolling and destroying a mobile home before crossing McFarland Creek and moving into Whittle and crossing KY 1611. The tornado partially removed the roof off a home and an outbuilding as it moved east-northeastward and crossed KY 76 before rapidly intensifying to high-end EF2 intensity, significantly debarking and stubbing hardwood trees, and destroying mobile homes and a camper.

The small tornado then crossed into Pulaski County and continued eastward across House Fork Creek and Wolf Creek, causing EF2-EF3 damage as it passed south of Faubush and EF1 damage south of Nancy while gradually shrinking in size. It then crossed Clifty Creek and struck a neighborhood south of KY 80 and the Lee's Ford Marina, causing heavy EF1-EF2 roof damage to homes and snapping trees and power poles. Two homes were destroyed, other homes and apartment building suffered heavy roof and exterior wall damage, vehicles were damaged, and trees were snapped or uprooted. The tornado strengthened further to high-end EF2 intensity at the bottom of the hill as it crossed and moved east of US 27/KY 1642. It heavily damaged or partially destroyed a small shopping center, the Area Technology Center, multiple businesses, metal buildings, and a church.

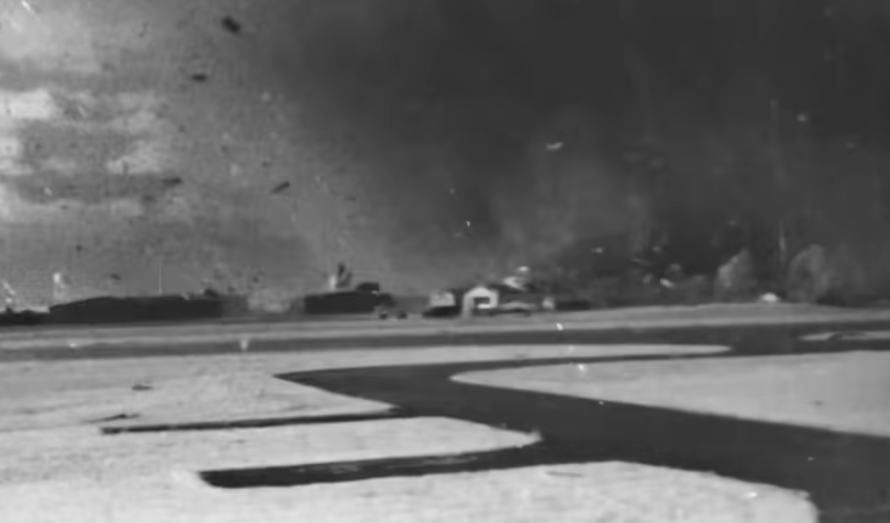
The tornado seen in London.

The tornado continued eastward and moved through the Daniel Boone National Forest, and northeast of the community of Mount Victory, the tornado intensified to low-end EF4 intensity for the first time. A one-story farmhouse along Poplarville Road was leveled at 170 mph (270 km/h). Several trees behind the residence were extensively debarked and stubbed. One woman was killed at the farm and became the first of many fatalities attributed by the tornado. Elsewhere along this segment of the path swaths of trees were mowed down, debarked, and sanded into stubs, a high-tension power pole was lifted, crumpled, and thrown several hundred yards downwind, and multiple residences were destroyed. The tornado reached its peak width of just under a mile as it moved through the forest and into Laurel County. The strengthening tornado then exited the forest and began impacting large residential areas south of London, first impacting a subdivision of homes along Sara Lane at high-end EF2 intensity. Several trees and power poles were snapped or uprooted and multiple homes suffered moderate to severe damage to their roofs and exterior walls.

Just before crossing I-75, the tornado became violent once again and obliterated the Sunshine Hills subdivision at EF4 intensity with winds of 170 mph (270 km/h). Many homes in this area were leveled and swept away, the Sunshine Hills Baptist Church was completely swept off its foundation, vehicles were thrown and mangled beyond recognition, and trees were heavily debarked and stubbed. Most of the casualties from this tornado occurred here. The tornado then crossed I-75 and continued eastward at EF3 intensity, causing widespread catastrophic damage in residential neighborhoods as well as the London-Corbin Airport, where several hangars as well as aircraft, including six Beechcraft T-34 Mentors and a medical helicopter, were thrown and destroyed. East of there, the tornado caused additional significant EF2-EF3 damage at Levi Jackson Park, the Laurel County Fairgrounds, Crooked Creek Golf Course, and other residential areas. The tornado then abruptly weakened significantly, causing only EF0 damage as it crossed KY 80 and KY 488 before dissipating west of Lida at 11:56 pm EDT.

The tornado was on the ground for 89 minutes, tracked 60.08 mi (96.69 km), and reached a peak width of 1,700 yd (1,600 m). In all, 19 people were directly killed, including 18 in London and one woman in rural Pulaski County, a man later died from complications relating to his injuries months later in December 2, 2025. At least 108 people were reportedly injured.

== Non-tornadic effects ==
Severe weather occurred over a wide area, including strong wind gusts and large hail. One person was injured in Macon, Illinois, when a tree fell onto a house. A dust storm warning was issued for Chicago, Illinois, with winds up to 70 mph (110 km/h) and near zero visibility. It was deemed the worst dust storm in Chicago since 1934. In Northern Virginia, two people were killed after trees fell onto their vehicles. In West Chester, Pennsylvania, a flash flooding required a man to be rescued from his car. Nearby, a Philadelphia Phillies game was delayed by the severe weather as well.

=== Heat wave ===
High temperature records for May 15 were broken in Chicago and Houston. A daily record high was also broken in Oklahoma City on May 14. The high temperatures in Minnesota also led to several wildfires, which burned 32,000 acres and destroyed 150 structures. Wildfires in Manitoba resulted in two deaths.

== Aftermath ==
=== Recovery efforts ===
The city of St. Louis and surrounding areas like Clayton declared a state of emergency after city officials confirmed five deaths across the city from severe weather. 80 volunteer structural engineers affiliated with the Missouri Structural Assessment and Visual Evaluation coalition converged in St. Louis the first week to assess the habitability of homes across the city, placing stickers on structures based on their integrity. Structures marked with red stickers are unsafe to occupy, while those with yellow stickers should be entered with caution. The stickers are non-binding and are meant for informative purposes only. Federal aid has been requested but still pending acceptance. The Federal Emergency Management Agency (FEMA) dispatched two teams to St. Louis following the tornado, focusing on Greater Ville and Kingsway East. On May 21, Missouri governor Mike Kehoe announced he would be asking President Trump for federal disaster aid following the tornado. Kehoe relayed that FEMA had called the amount of residential destruction in St. Louis the largest the organization had surveyed since the Joplin tornado in 2011. As of May 23, 2025, federal funding has yet to be allocated for the St. Louis tornado. FEMA was also dispatched to London, Kentucky to help with immediate recovery efforts. Kentucky governor Andy Beshear praised the federal response to the tornado, stating "But they've done a good job when FEMA has come in to Kentucky, and I'm grateful".

According to the Williamson County Emergency Management, the EF4 tornado near Marion damaged an estimated 35-40 homes, among which many were completely destroyed or uninhabitable; many were left without adequate supplies or shelter. Seven people were injured, none of which were life-threatening, and nobody was killed. In the immediate aftermath, first responders helped rescue people from the rubble, likely saving many lives and an overnight curfew was instituted by county officials for unsafe travel conditions. From there, efforts shifted towards long-term recovery efforts and helping the community rebuild after the disaster; volunteer groups contributed to the cleanup effort and organizations provided shelter and essential services to victims. The American Red Cross in Southern Illinois organized to provide social services, including temporary shelter and necessary supplies, and even senior support and mental health services to the victims of the tornado. Additionally, fundraisers were held to raise money for those who lost their homes in the event and to provide resources and relief for members of the community in the process of rebuilding.

=== Staffing cuts controversy ===
The issuance of tornado warnings during the event and staffing cuts as a whole at the National Weather Service in Jackson, Kentucky, were a significant source of controversy following the outbreak. Due to staffing cuts caused by the Department of Government Efficiency, the three major NWS offices in Kentucky were all understaffed at the time of the tornado outbreak. Despite the cuts, the Jackson office was prepared to be fully-staffed on May 16 due to the upcoming severe weather event. Christian Cassell, one of the lead meteorologists at the office, stated that "we saw the risk many days ago. We were already planning how we would staff days in advance".

== See also ==
- List of North American tornadoes and tornado outbreaks
- List of United States tornadoes in May 2025
- Tornado outbreak of March 2–3, 2012
- Tornado outbreak of December 10–11, 2021
- Weather of 2025
- List of F4, EF4, and IF4 tornadoes (2020–present)
