= Killing of Mansur Ball-Bey =

2015 police killing in St. Louis

On August 19, 2015, a Moorish man named Mansur Ball-Bey was shot and killed by a St. Louis police officer who was executing a search warrant at a house where Ball-Bey was present. Rumors surrounded the killing of Ball-Bey as to whether he was unarmed when shot by police, and crowds gathered in the street to express anger at the killing. The demonstrators eventually turned violent as the day wore on, and civil unrest lasted into the night. The St. Louis Circuit Attorney's office conducted a subsequent investigation and determined that the evidence did not support criminal charges against the two officers involved.

== Shooting ==
On the morning of August 19, 2015, at least 15 police officers and ATF agents arrived at Ball-Bey's aunt's home in the Fountain Park neighborhood of St. Louis to execute a search warrant. As police prepared to enter the home, Ball-Bey and one other man ran from the house. Police said that Ball-Bey had pointed a handgun with extended ammunition magazine at them, prompting them to open fire. After police fired their weapons, Ball-Bey was struck in the back and killed. Police said that crack cocaine were recovered from the scene. Police also said that they recovered two stolen firearms at the scene, specifically .40-caliber handguns. No usable DNA evidence was recovered from the guns, which is not unusual. However, social media postings by Ball-Bey showed him holding a gun matching the guns found on the scene. Ball-Bey had no criminal history, but "photos found on his cellphone and YouTube videos show him wearing T-shirts naming a gang in St. Louis."

One witness, an off-duty officer "said he saw Ball-Bey running with a gun in his hand and his arm extended before the witness ducked behind a parked truck. The witness said he could hear the shooting but could not see it but reported seeing Ball-Bey toss a gun near a trash bin afterward." The gun was loaded.

Ball-Bey's family disputed the police claim, claiming that the gun had been planted on Ball-Bey by police. The family's attorney claimed Ball-Bey was running from police when shot, explaining the bullet wound to the back. In contrast, the attorney for the two officers stated that "My client fired in defense of his partner ... when (Ball-Bey) turns toward (one officer) with a gun that has an extended clip with a 30-round magazine, the policemen have no choice but to pull the trigger."

== Protest and civil unrest in immediate aftermath ==
In the afternoon of the same day, angry residents took to the streets of Fountain Park to express outrage at the killing of Ball-Bey. Police responded with riot officers, and protests soon took a turn for the worse as protesters began throwing bricks, rocks and bottles at the police, who responded with tear gas.

According to police, over the course of the night, bricks and bottles were thrown at officers, and police responded with tear gas to disperse crowds. The police chief reported nine arrests, the torching of one car, and several reports of attempted robbery. St. Louis Alderman Antonio French reported that the disordered was partially fueled by misinformation, including false reports that Ball-Bey was 13 years old.

The day following the shooting, about 200 people attended a vigil in St. Louis in protest of the killing; unlike the events of the previous night, the vigil was peaceful.

=== Lawsuit over police response to protests ===
In 2017, the American Civil Liberties Union of Missouri (ACLU) filed a lawsuit over the police handling of protests following the killing of Ball-Bey. The ACLU of Missouri alleges that the police deployed tear gas indiscriminately and without warning.

== Investigation ==
A few days after the shooting, St. Louis Circuit Attorney Jennifer Joyce announced that her office would conduct an investigation. In June 2016, the circuit attorney office's report was made public, and Joyce announced that no charges would be filed against the two officers who shot Ball-Bey. Joyce said that more than two dozen people were interviewed during the investigation. She stated that eyewitness accounts and other evidence showed that it could not be proven beyond a reasonable doubt that the officers did not act in self-defense.

Joyce did, however, conclude that "there were several factors in the execution of this search warrant that we believe need to be reviewed and addressed" by the St. Louis police department. Specifically, Joyce criticized the lack of any surveillance conducted on the rear of the building before beginning the search.

== Civil suit by family ==
In 2020, Mansur's father, Dennis Ball-Bey, filed a wrongful death lawsuit against the officers involved in the shooting, along with the former chief of police and the city of St. Louis. In January 2025, a jury found in his favor, awarding the family $6.25 million plus $12.5 million in punitive damages for a total of $18.75 million.

== See also ==
- Killing of Anthony Lamar Smith
