= Greater Ville, St. Louis =

Neighborhood of St. Louis in Missouri, US

Coordinates: 38.6644°N 90.2366°W

- Neighborhood of St. Louis
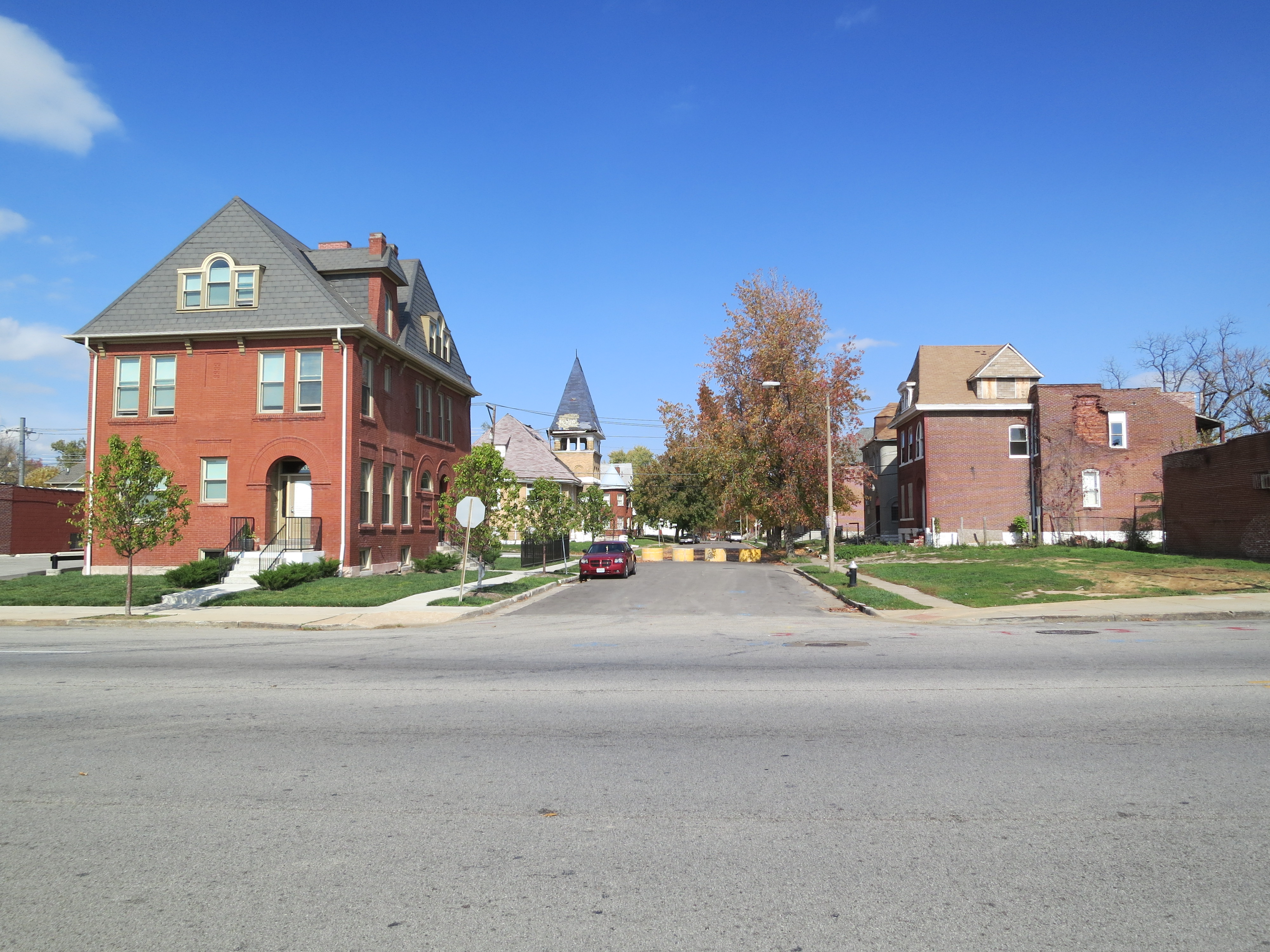
- The Dick Gregory Place, in the Greater Ville

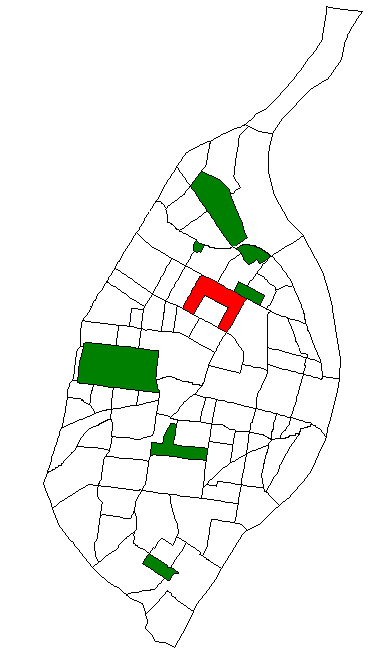
- Location (red) of Greater Ville within St. Louis
- Country: United States
- State: Missouri
- City: St. Louis
- Ward: 12

Government
  - Alderperson: Sharon Tyus

Area
  - Total: 0.96 sq mi (2.5 km^{2})
- Elevation: 499 ft (152 m)

Population (2020)
  - Total: 4,545
  - Density: 4,700/sq mi (1,800/km^{2})
- ZIP code(s): Parts of 63107, 63113, 63115
- Area code(s): 314
- Website: stlouis-mo.gov

The Greater Ville is a neighborhood of St. Louis, Missouri. It is bounded by Marcus Avenue to the northwest, Natural Bridge Avenue to the northeast, Dr. Martin Luther King Drive and St. Louis Avenue to the south, and North Vandeventer Avenue to the southeast. It borders the neighborhoods of The Ville, Kingsway East, O'Fallon, and JeffVanderLou.

== History ==
The Greater Ville developed in tandem with The Ville neighborhood, which the Greater Ville surrounds on three of its sides. The neighborhoods were recorded as one and the same until the mid-1970s, when the "Greater Ville Redevelopment Corporation" was established. In the mid-1880s, the Greater Ville housed primarily African Americans, German immigrants, and Irish immigrants. Restrictive covenants were used in the neighborhood, which forbade non-white people from owning some of its properties.

The Greater Ville declined since the 1950s, when middle class residents moved out. Poorer residents have since moved in after their original neighborhoods were gentrified. In 1996, the St. Louis Post-Dispatch ranked it the 56th safest St. Louis neighborhood, out of 76 neighborhoods. The neighborhood was struck by the 2025 tornado, and as of 2026, the debris left by the tornado is still being cleaned up.

Revitalization efforts have been pushed since at least the 1970s. In 2025, the Greater Ville was chosen for the "A Stronger Northside", a revitalization program, though its residents objected, saying the program would not benefit them as individuals.

The Greater Ville is significant in St. Louis African American history; it shares this history with the Ville. In 1999, a limestone monument honoring twenty famous African American residents of the neighborhood was installed in the Greater Ville.

== Demographics ==
Historical population
Census	Pop.	Note	%±
1990	12,483		—
2000	8,189		−34.4%
2010	6,189		−24.4%
2020	4,545		−26.6%

In 2020, Greater Ville's racial makeup was 95.2% Black, 1.3% White, 0.2% Native American, 2.5% Two or More Races, and 0.8% Some Other Race. 1.1% of the people were of Hispanic or Latino origin.

In 2010, Greater Ville's racial makeup was 97.4% Black, 0.7% White, 0.2% Native American, 1.4% Two or More Races, and 0.2% Some Other Race. 0.7% of the population was of Hispanic or Latino origin.
