= John O'Fallon =

American businessman (1791–1865)

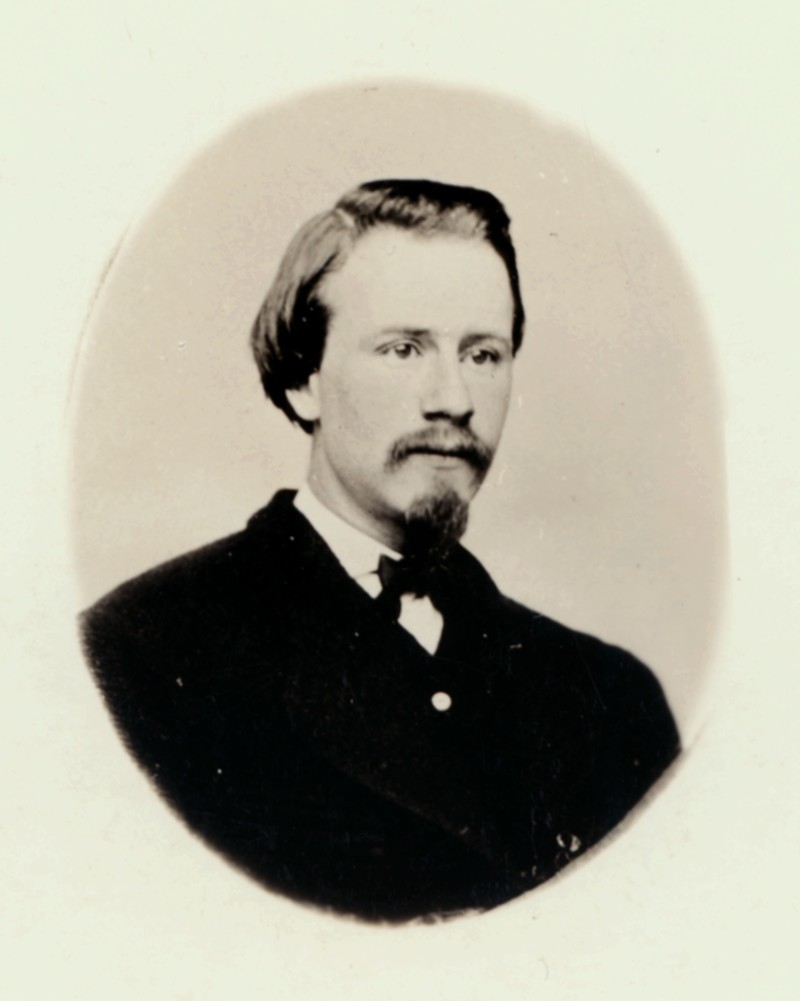
- Born: November 17, 1791; Jefferson County, Kentucky, US
- Died: December 17, 1865 (aged 74); St. Louis, Missouri, US
- Burial place: Bellefontaine Cemetery
- Spouse: Caroline Schutz O'Fallon (m. 1827)
- Military career
- Allegiance: United States
- Branch: US Army
- Service years: 1812–1818
- Rank: Captain
- Units: 2nd Regiment of Riflemen; Regiment of Riflemen

John O'Fallon (November 17, 1791 – December 17, 1865) was an American businessman, philanthropist, and military officer, a nephew of the explorer William Clark. During the 19th century he rose to become the wealthiest person in St. Louis, Missouri. The cities of O'Fallon, Illinois and O'Fallon, Missouri are named after him, as are the neighborhood of O'Fallon in the City of St. Louis, and O'Fallon Park within that neighborhood. In 1857, he donated over $1 million to establish the O'Fallon Institute at what is now Washington University in St. Louis.

== Early life ==
John O'Fallon was born in Jefferson County, Kentucky on November 17, 1791. His father, James O'Fallon, was a medical doctor who served as a surgeon in Washington's army during the Revolutionary War. After the war, he went to Louisville and married Frances Clark, a sister of George Rogers Clark and William Clark, Army officers, who became famous in exploring the Mississippi Valley.

In 1793, when O'Fallon was two and his brother Benjamin was an infant, his father died. Their uncle William Clark became the boys guardian in 1808. In 1810, John graduated from college in Lexington, Kentucky. In 1817, O'Fallon inherited four enslaved men and women - Patsy, Sousen, Frank and Alley - according to the terms of his grandfather's 1799 will.

== War of 1812 ==
Following in his father's footsteps, and at the urging of his friends and, probably, of a close family friend, Major Croghan, he entered the army early in the War of 1812. He was assigned to General Harrison's army at Vincennes, Indiana. Promoted to Captain of the Second U.S. Rifle Regiment by March 1814, by May 1815 he commanded this unit.

== Career ==
When the war ended, Congress downsized the army. O'Fallon was one of only four captains it chose to retain. However, on July 31, 1818, he resigned his commission, returned to St. Louis, and secured a post as sutler to the Yellowstone Expedition. The sluggish expedition never reached its destination. When it took two years to even reach Fort Lisa (near present-day Council Bluffs, Iowa), Congress cut its funding. O'Fallon continued as an army sutler in the Council Bluffs area. He freighted his supplies up the Mississippi river in his own boat or boats. In 1820, one of them sank, fully loaded, and nearly wiped him out. St. Louis financial institutions had been hard-hit by the Panic of 1819 and credit was tight, further adding to his financial woes. O'Fallon eventually decided that for him, the risks weren't worth the potential profit.

During the Missouri Crisis of 1819 and 1820, he was active in state-level politics and in Washington. O'Fallon opposed any restrictions on slavery in Missouri or in the remainder of the Louisiana Purchase. In 1821, he used his business connections in New Orleans to sell enslaved men, unbeknownst to them, as they worked boats from St. Louis to New Orleans. In 1822, he sought to purchase enslaved men and women in Virginia for use in Missouri.

In 1823, he turned his sutler's business over to a close friend (James Kennerly) and began farming and making whiskey with his half-brother in Louisville, Kentucky. The whiskey-making, apparently, turned a big profit.

His whiskey trade apparently didn't hurt his reputation; in 1822 St. Louis elected him Representative to the first Missouri State Legislature, and re-elected him in 1824.

Through subsequent investment, speculation, and inheritance he became one of the leading businessmen of St. Louis. He was president of a branch bank of the U.S. Bank, and "was on the board of half the businesses in St. Louis."

He was especially active in railroad-building. O'Fallon presided over the 1849 committee which formed the Pacific Railroad (now Missouri Pacific Railroad); was the first president of the Ohio and Mississippi Railroad (now Baltimore and Ohio Railroad) and in 1850 became president of the North Missouri Railroad (now the Wabash Railroad).

== Later years ==
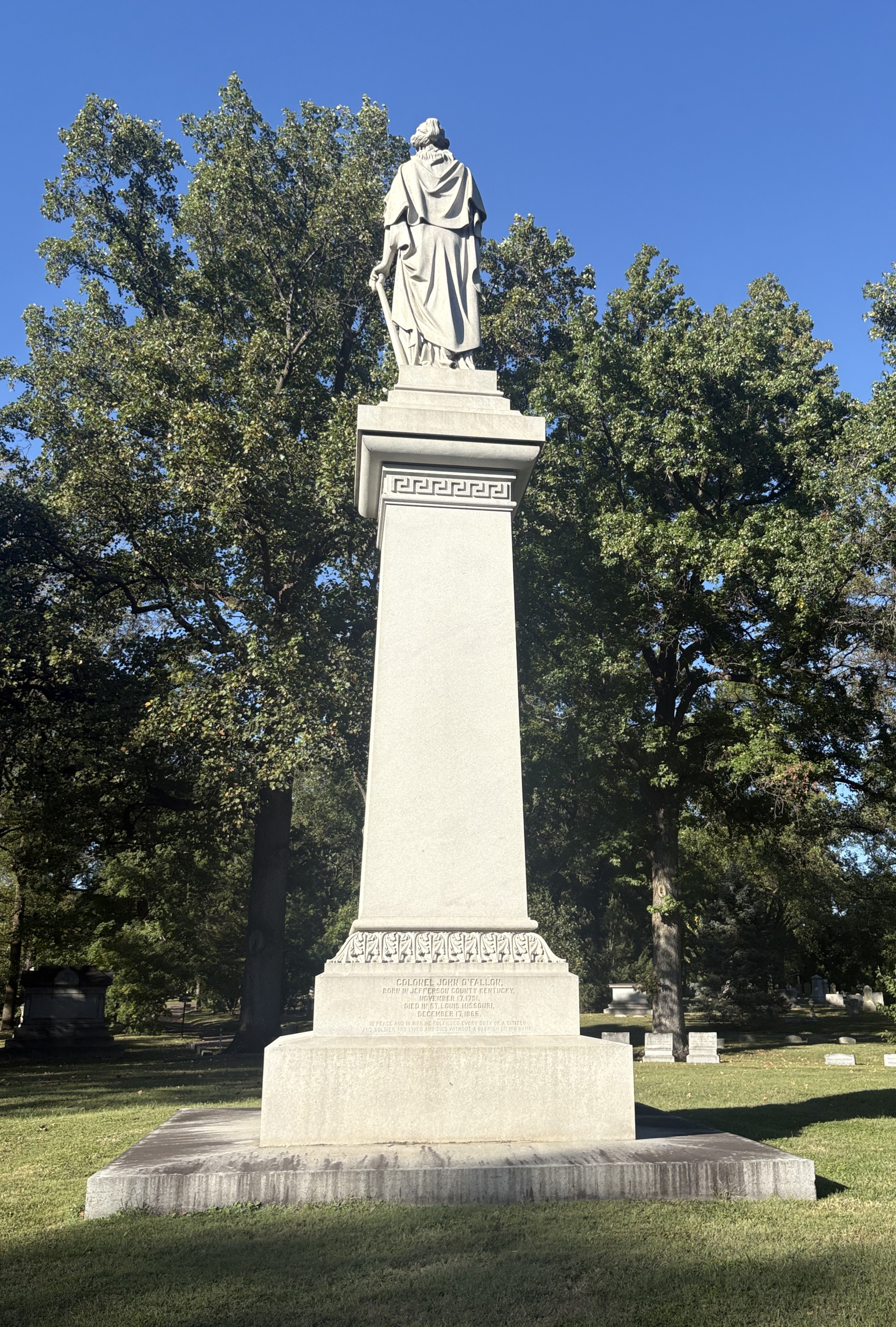
O'Fallon's grave at Bellefontaine Cemetery

In later life, O'Fallon used some of his wealth and prestige for the benefit of others. He donated land for Saint Louis University, Washington University in St. Louis (two blocks), O'Fallon Park, and a water works. He also financially supported Washington University's medical college and founded O'Fallon Polytechnic Institute.

O'Fallon died on December 17, 1865, in St. Louis. He was buried in Bellefontaine Cemetery.
