= O'Fallon Park =

Park in St. Louis, Missouri, United States

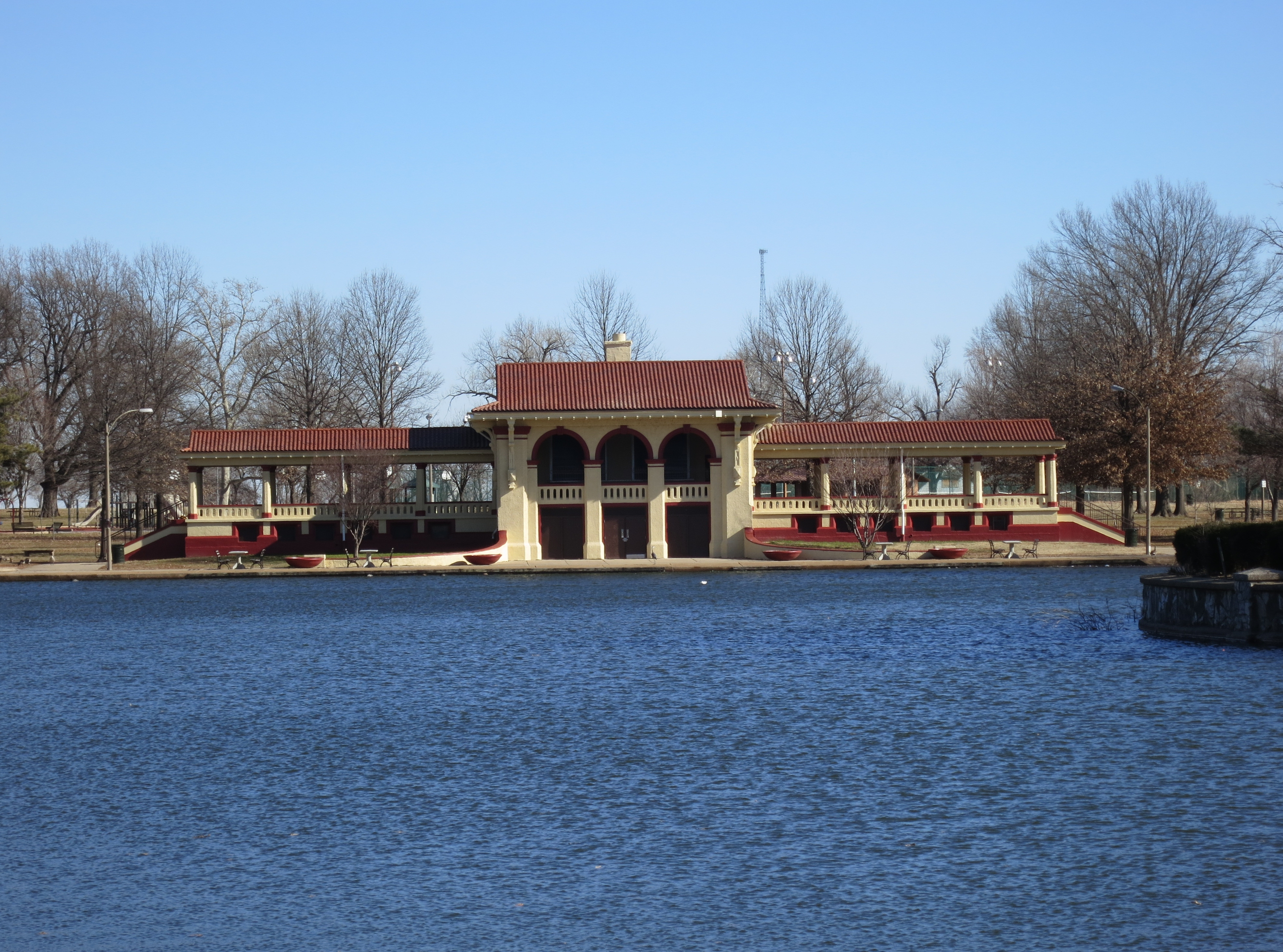
- O'Fallon Park Boathouse
- Interactive map of O'Fallon Park
- Type: Urban park
- Location: St. Louis, Missouri, United States
- Coordinates: 38.6807°N 90.2193°W
- Area: 126.63 acres (51.25 ha)
- Created: 1908
- Operator: St. Louis Department of Parks, Recreation, and Forestry
- Status: Open
- Public transit: MetroBus
- Website: stlouis-mo.gov

O'Fallon Park is a municipal park in St. Louis, Missouri, that opened in 1908.

== Description ==
The park is 126.63 acres and was once part of O'Fallon's 600-acre land holding. The park has a lake with a boathouse. It has basketball courts, tennis courts, softball fields, and a football field. It has a playground, multiple picnic grounds, and a spray pool.

== Geography ==
O'Fallon Park is located near the riverfront. On the north, it is bordered by Interstate 70; on the southwest, by W. Florissant Ave. The southeastern border follows E. Harris Ave., Algernon St., and Adelaide Ave.

=== Surrounding areas ===
O'Fallon Park is surrounded by five St. Louis neighborhoods. North Riverfront borders the north, Penrose borders the west, Near North Riverfront borders the east by a tip, and finally two neighborhoods border the south, O'Fallon and College Hill.

== History ==
The park is named after John O'Fallon, a colonel who fought in the War of 1812 and nephew of William Clark. Within the land purchased by O'Fallon were the remains of a Native American village and burial grounds, of which his enslaved workers disposed in the process of excavation. In 1875, the city purchased 166 acres, including the historic mansion which was destroyed after a fire.

In the early 20th century, Charles Henry Turner conducted his ground-breaking research on bees in O'Fallon park.

Around 1960, about 40 acres of park were paved over in the construction of Interstate 70.

In 2020, the park underwent remodeling, including renovations on the historic O'Fallon Park Boathouse.

The 2025 St. Louis tornado created significant damage in the park, felling an estimated 300 trees. A volunteer response network established the People's Response Hub as the primary relief effort at the park YMCA for the surrounding neighborhoods and much of North City.

== See also ==
- John O'Fallon
- People and culture of St. Louis, Missouri
- Neighborhoods of St. Louis
- Parks in St. Louis, Missouri
