= Fountain Park, St. Louis =

Neighborhood of St. Louis in Missouri, US

Coordinates: 38.6563°N 90.2598°W

Fountain Park
- Neighborhood
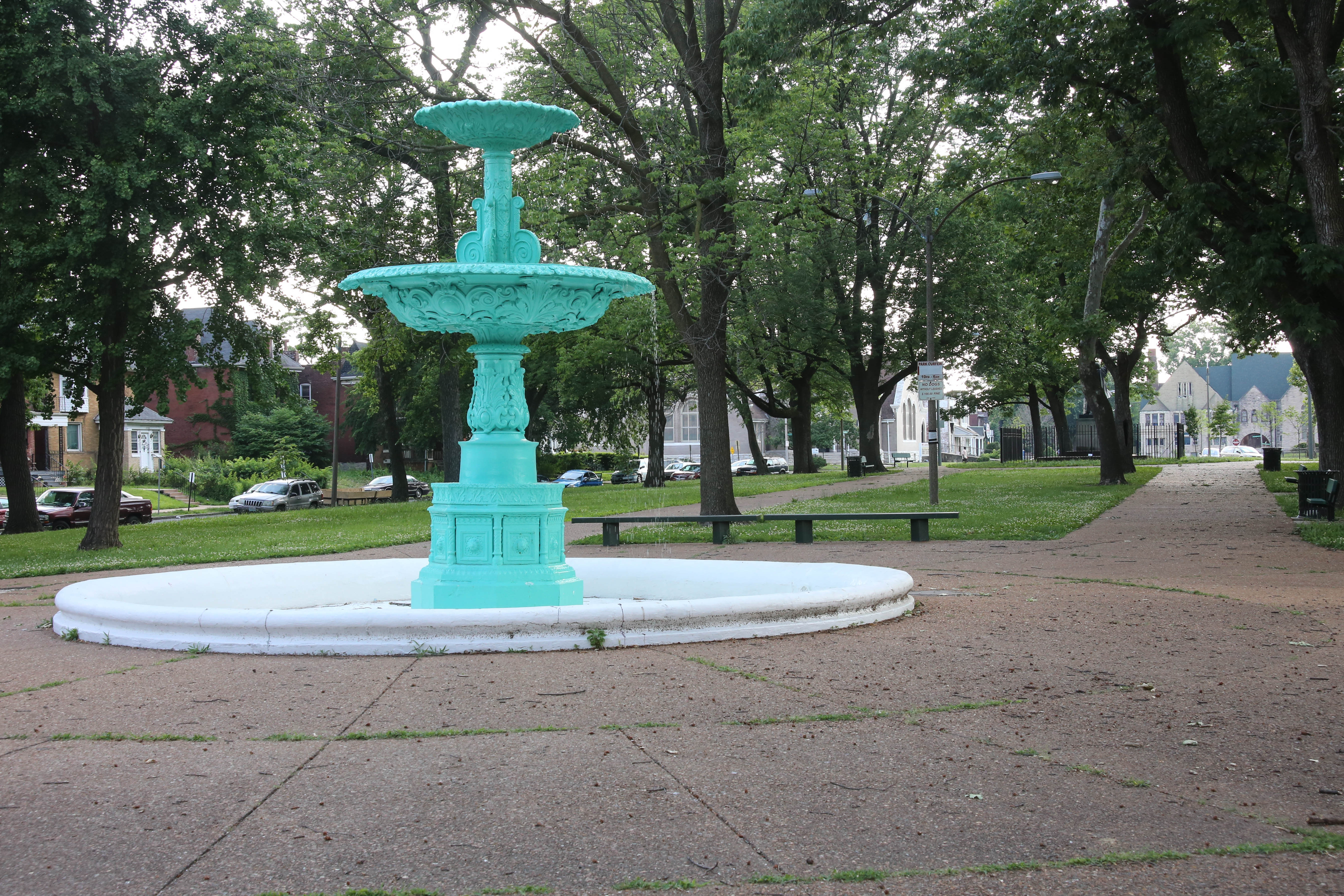
- The Fountain, Fountain Park, June 2017

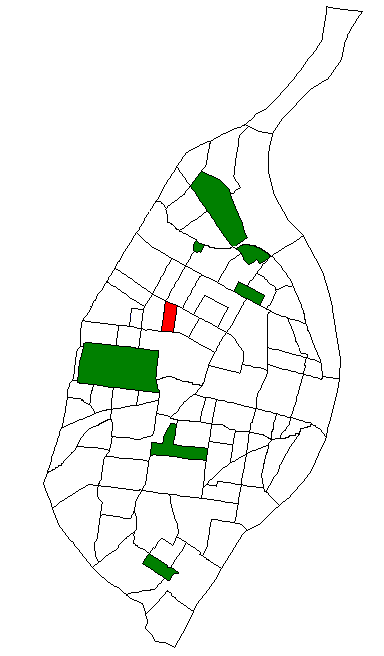
- Location (red) of Fountain Park within St. Louis
- Country: United States
- State: Missouri
- City: St. Louis
- Wards: 10

Government
  - Aldermen: Shameem Clark Hubbard

Area
  - Total: 0.24 sq mi (0.62 km^{2})

Population (2020)
  - Total: 1,075
  - Density: 4,500/sq mi (1,700/km^{2})
- ZIP code(s): Parts of 63103, 63113
- Area code(s): 314
- Website: stlouis-mo.gov

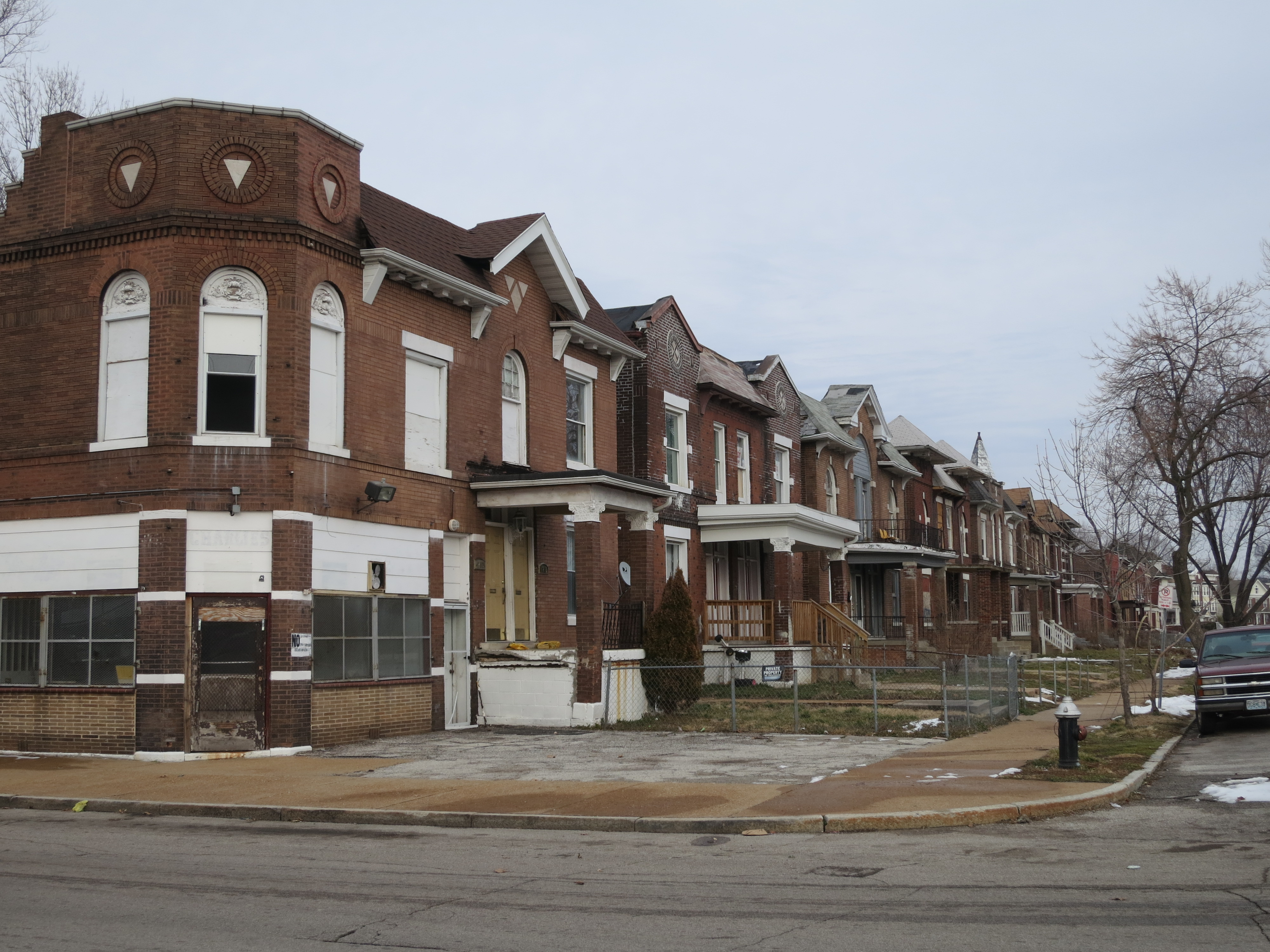
Houses off Walton, Fountain Park neighborhood, February 2013

Fountain Park is a neighborhood of St. Louis, Missouri, United States. Originally the Aubert Place subdivision, it was laid out by John Lay in 1857. The Fountain Park neighborhood is located in north St. Louis with Martin Luther King Drive on the north, Delmar Boulevard on the south, Walton Avenue on the east, and Kingshighway Boulevard on the west. It is just two blocks north of the Central West End (CWE) of the city. The Fountain Park neighborhood is named after Fountain Park, a small oval-shaped city park near its center. A Martin Luther King Jr. statue sculpted by Rudolph Edward Torrini is situated on the west side of the park.

The park at the neighborhood's center hosts large Juneteenth celebrations since the mid-2000s. The space was reserved for a public park in 1857 and was donated to the city by John Lay in 1889. The fountain in its center was given by the Merchants Exchange. Residents and supporters participate in the Operation Brightside clean-up and the National Night Out.

In May 2025, the neighborhood sustained significant damage from an EF3 tornado that struck St. Louis. Numerous homes in Fountain Park were damaged or destroyed, and debris remain scattered throughout the area.

== Demographics ==
In 2010 Fountain Park's racial makeup was 97.4% Black, 1.1% White, 1.2% Two or More Races, and 0.1% Some Other Race. 0.5% of the population was of Hispanic or Latino origin.

In 2020 Fountain Park's racial makeup was 89.2% Black, 3.6% White, 1.1% American Indian or Alaska Native, 4.2% Two or More Races, and 1.9% Some Other Race. 1.7% of the population was of Hispanic or Latino origin.

Historical population
Year	Pop.	±%
1990	2,333	—
2000	1,804	−22.7%
2010	1,484	−17.7%
2020	1,075	−27.6%

== See also ==
- Delmar Divide
- Neighborhoods of St. Louis
