= O'Fallon, St. Louis =

Neighborhood of St. Louis in Missouri, US

Coordinates: 38.6730°N 90.2275°W

O'Fallon
- Neighborhood of St. Louis
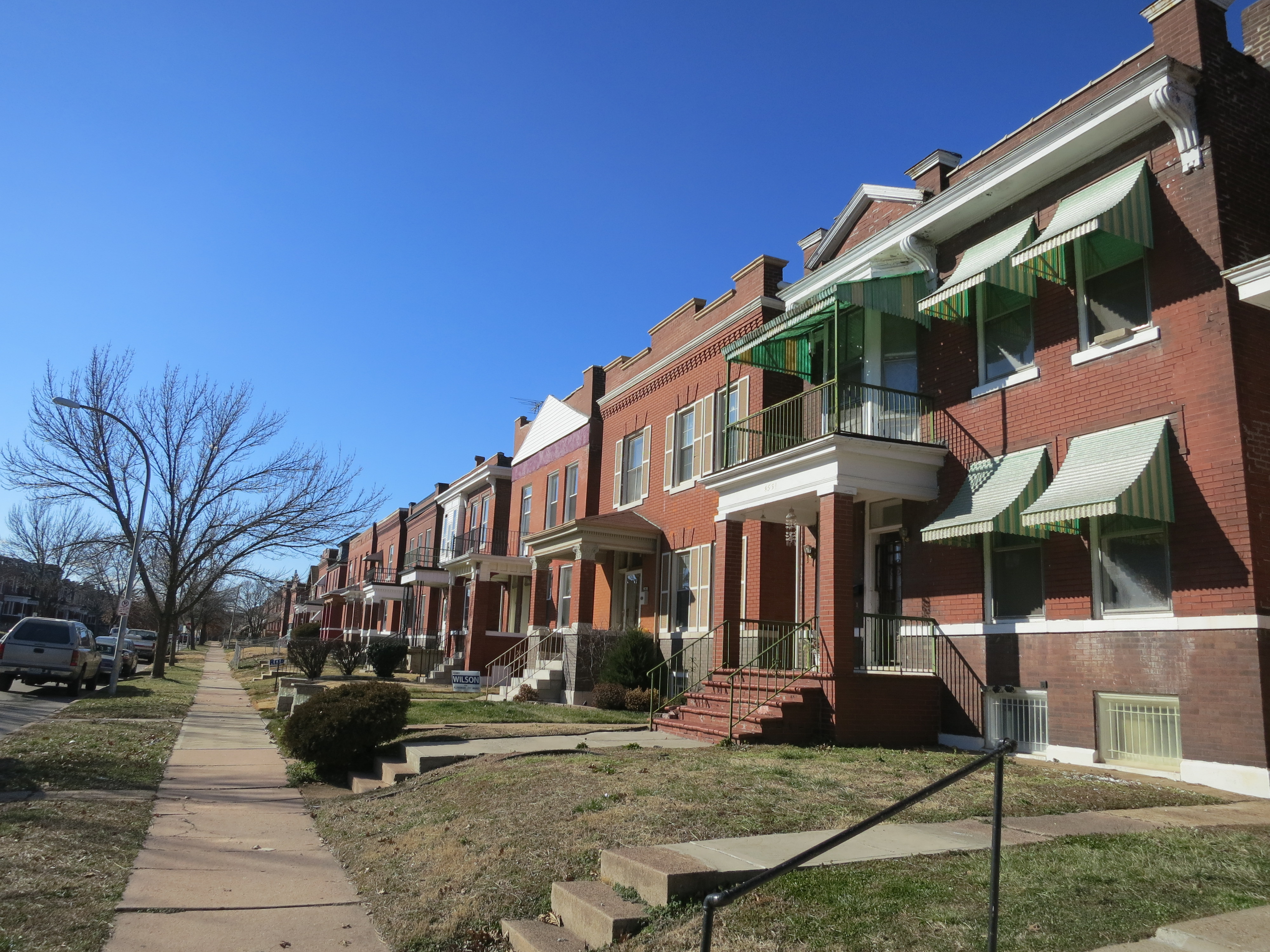
- Houses in O'Fallon, January 2013

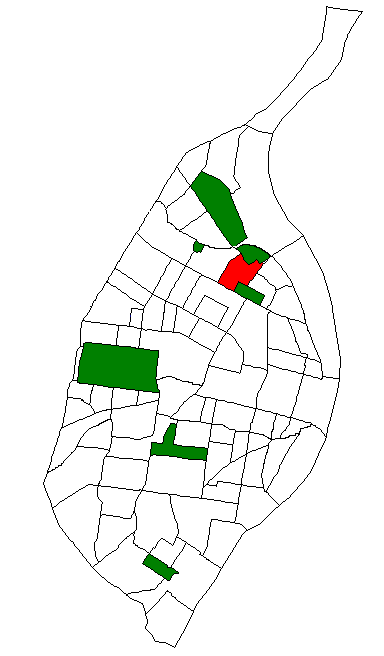
- Location (red) of O'Fallon within St. Louis
- Country: United States
- State: Missouri
- City: St. Louis
- Wards: 11

Government
  - Aldermen: Laura Keys

Area
  - Total: 0.59 sq mi (1.5 km^{2})

Population (2020)
  - Total: 4,342
  - Density: 7,400/sq mi (2,800/km^{2})
- ZIP code(s): Parts of 63107, 63115
- Area code(s): 314
- Website: stlouis-mo.gov

O'Fallon is a neighborhood of St. Louis, Missouri. The neighborhood is located on the north side of the City of St. Louis, nestled between O'Fallon Park and Fairground Park. It is bounded by West Florissant, Harris Avenue, Algernon Street and Adelaide on the north, Pope Avenue on the northwest, Kossuth and Natural Bridge Avenues on the south via Fair Avenue, Warne on the east, and Newstead on the west.

== Characteristics ==
The O'Fallon neighborhood is anchored by two major public parks, O'Fallon Park and Fairground Park. The area is primarily a residential neighborhood with streets lined with brick and frame single-family homes, two-family homes, and a few multi-family buildings. Many of the housing units are owner-occupied, but there is a visibly large amount of abandoned, crumbling buildings and vacant lots. Ones that have been maintained are pleasant brick homes with well-tended porches. The neighborhood has not remained relatively stable thanks to many multi-generation residents in social gridlock and a high percentage of African Americans under the poverty line.

== Demographics ==
Historical population
Census	Pop.	Note	%±
1990	8,901		—
2000	7,151		−19.7%
2010	5,791		−19.0%
2020	4,342		−25.0%

In 2020 the racial makeup of O'Fallon was 95.2% Black, 1.3% White, 0.5% Asian, 0.3% Native American, 2.5% Two or More Races, and 0.6% Some Other Race. 0.8% of the population was of Hispanic or Latino origin.

== See also ==
- John O'Fallon
