= Kingsway East, St. Louis =

Neighborhood of St. Louis in Missouri, US

Coordinates: 38.6683°N 90.2526°W

- Neighborhood of St. Louis
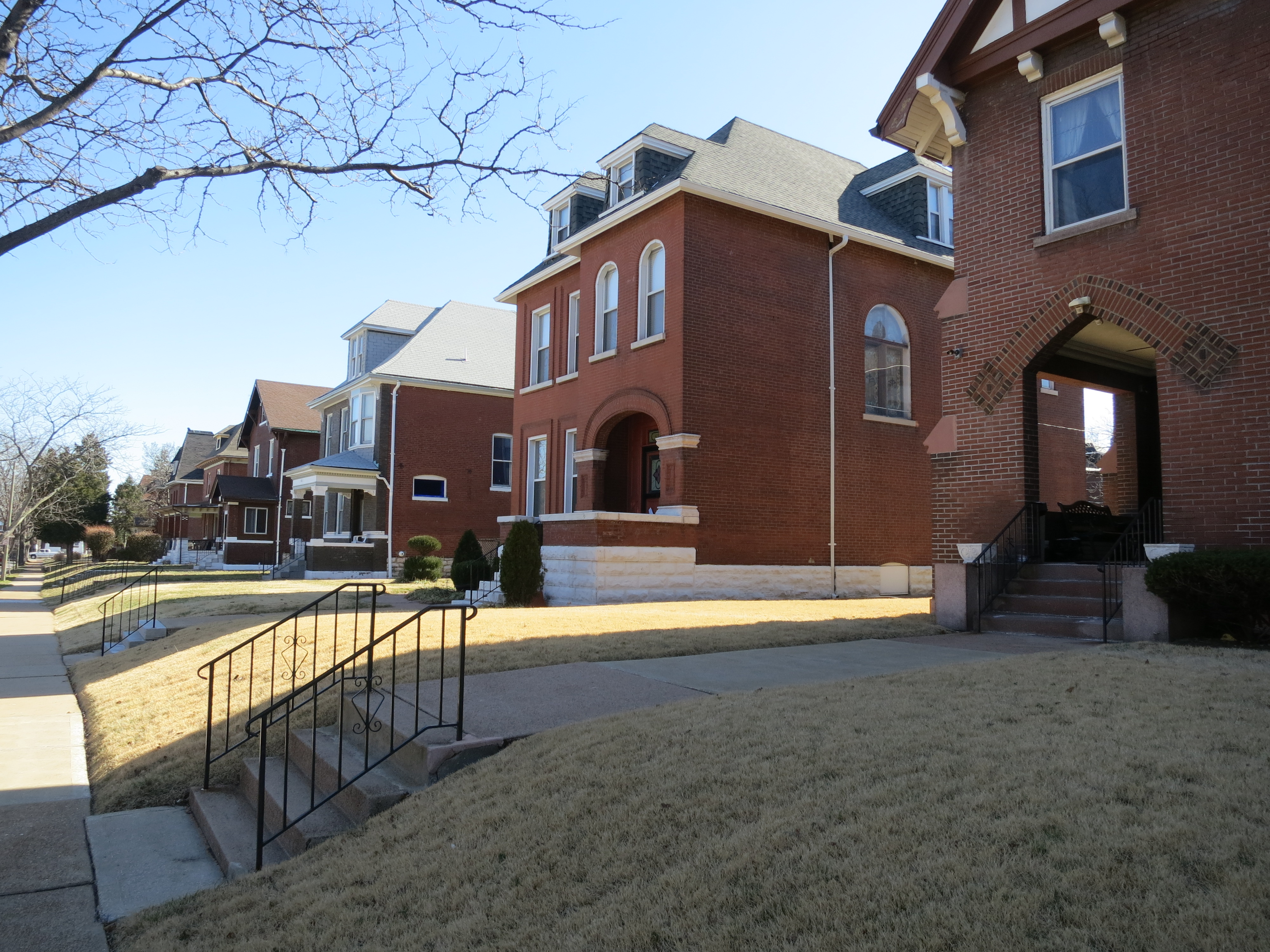
- Wabada Avenue in Kingsway East, February 2013

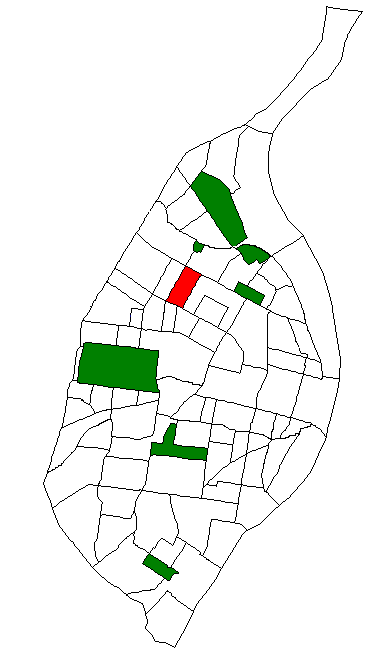
- Location (red) of Kingsway East within St. Louis
- Country: United States
- State: Missouri
- City: St. Louis
- Wards: 12

Government
  - Aldermen: Sharon Tyus

Area
  - Total: 0.49 sq mi (1.3 km^{2})

Population (2020)
  - Total: 2,502
  - Density: 5,100/sq mi (2,000/km^{2})
- ZIP code(s): Parts of 63113, 63115
- Area code(s): 314
- Website: stlouis-mo.gov

Kingsway East is a neighborhood of St. Louis, Missouri. The neighborhood is generally defined by Natural Bridge on the North, Martin Luther King on the South, Marcus Avenue on the East, and Kingshighway on the West.

== Institutions ==
Hickey Elementary School is the sole educational institution in the Kingsway East neighborhood. The primary recreational facilities in the area are Handy Park and Handy Park Recreational Center, named for W.C. Handy, "father of the blues." The Kingsway Housing Corporation is working together with the Kingsway community to preserve and continue the revitalization of the neighborhood. ECHO, Emergency Children's Home, provides needed social, emotional, and residential services to many area youths.

== Characteristics ==
Housing in Kingsway East is a mix of brick bungalows, small frame cottages, and multi-unit brick apartment buildings. Most of the one-and two-story brick residences were built between 1900 and 1920. The small frame homes scattered throughout the neighborhood are remainders from the area's days as a farming community. Long-time residents and well-maintained properties make an attractive neighborhood and stable community. Many of the neighboring community's churches, especially Immanuel Lutheran and Cote Brilliante Presbyterian, offer a variety of activity programs. Shopping and educational facilities are also located nearby.

== Demographics ==
In 2020 Kingshighway East's population was 1.8% White, 92.9% Black, 0.3% Native American, 0.2% Asian, and 4.0% Two or More Races. 1.1% of the population was of Hispanic or Latino.
