= List of places hit multiple times by significant tornadoes =

Populated places struck more than once by an F2 or above

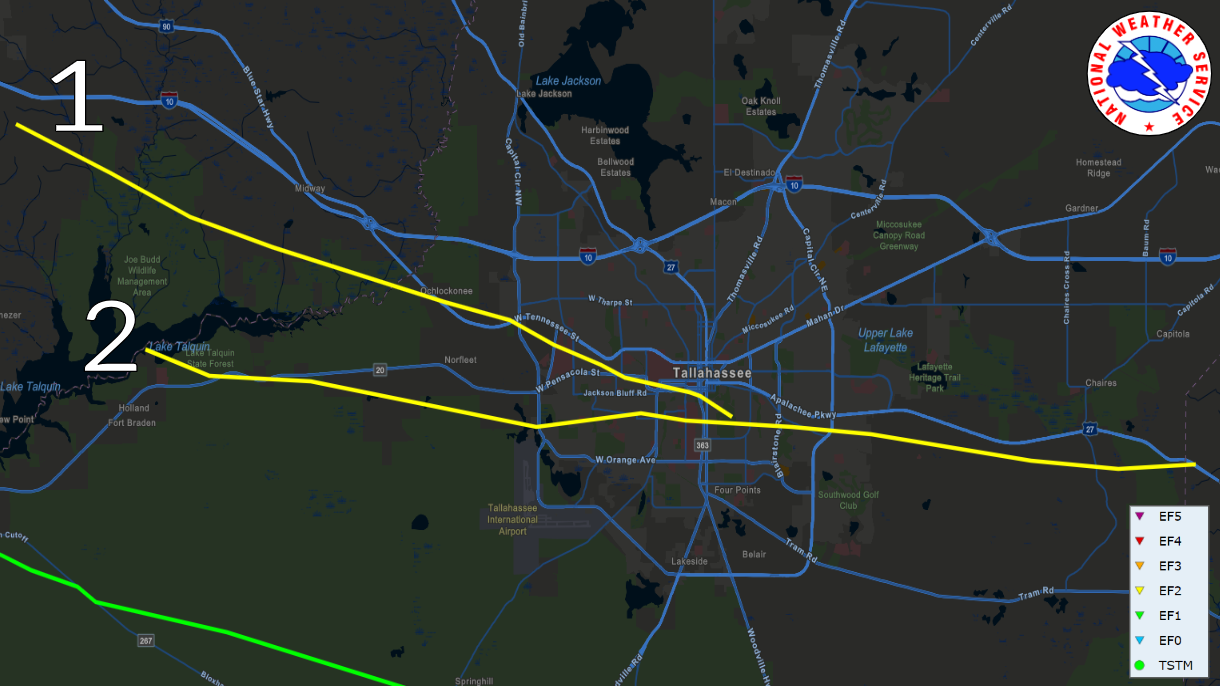
This map shows the path of two strong tornadoes that hit Tallahassee, Florida simultaneously on May 10, 2024.

This is a list of populated places that have been struck on more than one occasion by significant tornadoes. "Significant" refers to tornadoes F2 and above on the Fujita scale or equivalent scales.

A tornado myth holds that any given location cannot be hit by tornadoes more than once. This is not true, and even individual structures or points can be hit by two or more different tornadoes, even in the span of a single day. When asked about the subject, chief meteorologist at KTVT Larry Mowry described repeat tornado strikes on any given city as "just the way storms operate", and driven by luck and many American cities' location in Tornado Alley rather than clear, smaller-scale meteorological factors. However, some cities, such as Moore, Oklahoma, are notable for their sheer number of tornado strikes, with Moore recording 26 total (Note: This total includes tornadoes that were not rated, and those rated below F2 or equivalent on the Fujita Scale, and thus are not included on this list.) in the period between 1903 and 2025.

== List ==
Cities hit by more than one significant tornado
Location	F/EF scale rating	Date	Event	Casualties	References
Andover, Kansas	F5	April 26, 1991	1991 Andover tornado	17 fatalities, 225 injuries	
Andover, Kansas	EF3	April 29, 2022	2022 Andover tornado	3 injuries	
Arabi, Louisiana	EF3	March 22, 2022	Tornado outbreak of March 21–23, 2022	1 fatality (+1 indirect), 2 injuries	
Arabi, Louisiana	EF2	December 14, 2022	Tornado outbreak of December 12–15, 2022	0 fatalities, 6 injuries	
Barnsley, Kentucky	EF4	December 10, 2021	2021 Western Kentucky tornado	57 fatalities (+1 indirect), 519 injuries	
Barnsley, Kentucky	EF3	May 26, 2024	Tornado outbreak of May 25–27, 2024	1 fatality, 21 injuries	
Bowling Green, Kentucky	EF3	December 10, 2021	2021 Bowling Green tornadoes	16 (+1 indirect, 63 injuries)	
Bowling Green, Kentucky	EF2	December 10, 2021	2021 Bowling Green tornadoes		
Chicago, Illinois	N/A	May 6, 1876	Tornadoes in Chicago	2 (35 injured)	
Chicago, Illinois	F2	May 25, 1896	Tornadoes in Chicago		^{:70}
Chicago, Illinois	F4	March 28, 1920	Tornadoes in Chicago	20 (300 injured)	^{:161}
Chicago, Illinois	F2	March 4, 1961	Tornadoes in Chicago	1 (114 injured)	
Chicago, Illinois	F2	May 26, 1965	Tornadoes in Chicago	0 (11 injured)	^{:469}
Chicago, Illinois	F4	April 21, 1967	Tornadoes in Chicago	33 (500 injured)	
Chicago, Illinois	F2	April 30, 1970	Tornadoes in Chicago		
Clarksville, Tennessee	F3	January 22, 1999	Tornado outbreak of January 21–23, 1999	0 fatalities, 5 injuries	
Clarksville, Tennessee	EF3	December 9, 2023	December 2023 Tennessee tornado outbreak	4 fatalities, 62 injuries	
Codell, Kansas	F2	May 20, 1916	1916–1918 Codell tornadoes	0 fatalities	^{:746}
Codell, Kansas	F3	May 20, 1917	1916–1918 Codell tornadoes	0 fatalities	^{:751}
Codell, Kansas	F4	May 20, 1918	1916–1918 Codell tornadoes	0 fatalities, 65 injuries	^{:759–760}
Covington, Tennessee	F2	November 9, 2002	2002 Veterans Day weekend tornado outbreak	0 fatalities, 1 injury	
Covington, Tennessee	EF3	March 31, 2023	Tornado outbreak of March 31 – April 1, 2023	1 fatality, 28 injuries	
Darien, Illinois	F4	June 13, 1976	Tornado outbreak sequence of June 11–14, 1976	2 fatalities, 26 injuries	
Darien, Illinois	EF3	June 20, 2021	2021 Naperville–Woodridge tornado	0 fatalities (+1 indirect), 11 injuries	
Dyersburg, Tennessee	F3	March 21, 1952	Tornado outbreak of March 21–22, 1952	10 fatalities, 30 injuries	
Dyersburg, Tennessee	F2	May 4, 2003	Tornado outbreak sequence of May 2003	0 fatalities, 10 injuries	
El Reno, Oklahoma	EF5	May 24, 2011	2011 El Reno–Piedmont tornado	9 fatalities, 181 injuries	
El Reno, Oklahoma	EF3	May 31, 2013	2013 El Reno tornado	8 fatalities, 151 injuries	
El Reno, Oklahoma	EF3	May 25, 2019	Tornado outbreak sequence of May 2019	2 fatalities, 29 injuries	
Fort Smith, Arkansas	F4	January 11, 1898	Fort Smith, Arkansas, tornadoes of January 11, 1898	55 (113 injuries)	
Fort Smith, Arkansas	F3	April 21, 1996	Tornado outbreak sequence of April 1996	2 fatalities, 40 injuries	
Garland, Texas	F3	October 12, 1969		0 fatalities, 3 injuries	
Garland, Texas	F3	December 13, 1984		0 fatalities (28 injuries)	
Garland, Texas	F2	January 19, 1990	List of United States tornadoes from January to February 1990	0 fatalities (1 injury)	
Garland, Texas	EF4	December 26, 2015	2015 Garland tornado	10 fatalities (468 injuries)	
Garland, Texas	EF2	October 20, 2019	Tornado outbreak of October 20–22, 2019		
Hackleburg, Alabama	F4	April 20, 1920	1920 Starkville MS/Waco AL tornado	88 fatalities, 700 injuries	
Hackleburg, Alabama	F4	April 12, 1943	1943 Hackleburg tornado	4 fatalities, 60 injuries	
Hackleburg, Alabama	EF5	April 27, 2011	2011 Hackleburg–Phil Campbell tornado	72 fatalities, 145 injuries	
Harvest, Alabama	F5	April 3, 1974	1974 Tanner tornadoes	28 (267 injured)	
Harvest, Alabama	F5	April 3, 1974	1974 Tanner tornadoes	16 (190 injured)	
Harvest, Alabama	EF5	April 27, 2011	2011 Hackleburg–Phil Campbell tornado	71 (145 injured)	
Harvest, Alabama	F4	May 18, 1995	1995 Anderson Hills tornado	1 fatality (55 injured)	
Harvest, Alabama	EF3	March 2, 2012	Tornado Outbreak of March 2-3 2012	0	
Humboldt, Tennessee	F2	December 19, 1957	Tornado outbreak sequence of December 18–20, 1957		
Humboldt, Tennessee	EF2	May 2, 2010	Tornado outbreak of April 30 – May 2, 2010		
Huntsville, Alabama	F2	November 24, 1967	Tornadoes of 1967	0 fatalities, 7 injured	
Huntsville, Alabama	F2	December 18, 1967	Tornadoes of 1967	4 fatalities, 29 injured	
Huntsville, Alabama	F3	April 3, 1974	1974 Super Outbreak	2 fatalities, 7 injured	
Huntsville, Alabama	F4	November 15, 1989	November 1989 tornado outbreak	21 fatalities, 463 injured	
Huntsville, Alabama	F4	May 18, 1995	1995 Anderson Hills tornado	1 fatality, 55 injured	
Huntsville, Alabama	EF2	Jan 21, 2010	tornadoes of 2010	0 fatalities, 3 injuries	
Huntsville, Alabama	EF2	May 8, 2024	tornado outbreak of May 6-10, 2024	0 fatalities, 0 injuries	
Idabel, Oklahoma	F3	October 22, 1972		0 fatalities, 1 injury	
Idabel, Oklahoma	F2	October 22, 1972		0 fatalities, 1 injury	
Idabel, Oklahoma	EF4	November 4, 2022	Tornado outbreak of November 4–5, 2022	0 fatalities, 13 injuries	
Jackson, Tennessee	F3	March 14, 1953	Tornado outbreak of March 12–15, 1953	0 fatalities, 3 injuries	
Jackson, Tennessee	F3	January 17, 1999	Tornado outbreak of January 17–18, 1999	0 fatalities, 2 injuries	
Jackson, Tennessee	F4	January 17, 1999	Tornado outbreak of January 17–18, 1999	6 fatalities, 106 injuries	
Jackson, Tennessee	F4	May 4, 2003	Tornado outbreak sequence of May 2003	11 fatalities, 86 injuries	
Jackson, Tennessee	F3	May 4, 2003	Tornado outbreak sequence of May 2003		
Jackson, Tennessee	EF4	February 5, 2008	2008 Super Tuesday tornado outbreak	0 fatalities, 58 injuries	
Joplin, Missouri	F4	3 April 1956	Tornado outbreak of April 2–3, 1956	0 fatalities, 59 injuries	
Joplin, Missouri	F3	May 5, 1971	1971 Joplin tornado	1 fatality, 60 injuries	
Joplin, Missouri	EF5	May 22, 2011	2011 Joplin tornado	158 fatalities, 1150 injuries	
Kissimmee, Florida	F2	January 28, 1973		0 fatalities, 7 injuries	
Kissimmee, Florida	F3	February 22, 1998	1998 Kissimmee tornado	25 fatalities, >150 injuries	
La Plata, Maryland	F4	November 9, 1926		17 fatalities, 65 injuries	
La Plata, Maryland	F2	July 27, 1994			
La Plata, Maryland	F4	April 28, 2002	2002 La Plata tornado	3 fatalities (+2 indirect), 122 injuries	
La Plata, Maryland	F2	April 28, 2002	Tornado outbreak of April 27–28, 2002		
McDonald Chapel, Alabama	F4	April 15, 1956	1956 McDonald Chapel tornado	25 fatalities, 200 injuries	
McDonald Chapel, Alabama	F5	April 4, 1977	1977 Smithfield tornado	22 fatalities, 130 injuries	
McDonald Chapel, Alabama	F5	April 8, 1998	1998 Oak Grove–Birmingham tornado	32 fatalities, 259 injuries	
McDonald Chapel, Alabama	EF4	April 27, 2011	2011 Tuscaloosa–Birmingham tornado	64 (+8 indirect) fatalities, 1,500+ injuries	
Memphis, Tennessee	F3	April 24, 1970		0 fatalities, 5 injuries	
Memphis, Tennessee	F3	April 24, 1970		0 fatalities, 13 injuries	
Memphis, Tennessee	F3	April 24, 1970		0 fatalities, 3 injuries	
Memphis, Tennessee	F2	August 29, 1978		0 fatalities, 26 injuries	
Memphis, Tennessee	EF2	February 5, 2008	2008 Super Tuesday tornado outbreak	3 fatalities, 13 injuries	
Moore, Oklahoma	F2	April 5, 1951		0	
Moore, Oklahoma	F2	April 28, 1960		0	
Moore, Oklahoma	F2	April 28, 1960		0 fatalities, 6 injuries	
Moore, Oklahoma	F3	November 19, 1973		5 fatalities, 46 injuries	
Moore, Oklahoma	F2	October 4, 1998		0	
Moore, Oklahoma	F5	May 3, 1999	1999 Bridge Creek-Moore tornado	36 fatalities (+5 indirect), 583 injuries	
Moore, Oklahoma	F4	May 3, 2003	Tornado outbreak sequence of May 2003	0 (45 injured)	
Moore, Oklahoma	EF4	May 10, 2010	Tornado outbreak of May 10–13, 2010	2 fatalities (49 injuries)	
Moore, Oklahoma	EF5	May 20, 2013	2013 Moore tornado	24 fatalities (+2 indirect, 212 injuries)	
Nashville, Tennessee	F2	April 1, 1974	Tornado outbreak of April 1–2, 1974	1 fatality, 60 injuries	
Nashville, Tennessee	F3	April 16, 1998	Tornado outbreak of April 15–16, 1998	1 fatality, 60 injuries	
Nashville, Tennessee	EF3	March 3, 2020	2020 Nashville tornado	5 fatalities, 220 injuries	
Nashville, Tennessee	EF2	December 9, 2023	December 2023 Tennessee tornado outbreak	3 fatalities, 22 injuries	
Newbern, Tennessee	F2	May 4, 2003	Tornado outbreak sequence of May 2003		
Newbern, Tennessee	F3	April 2, 2006	Tornado outbreak of April 2, 2006	16 fatalities, 70 injuries	
Newbern, Tennessee	EF3	December 10, 2021	Tornado outbreak of December 10–11, 2021	0 fatalities, 38 injuries	
North Little Rock, Arkansas	EF2	April 3, 2008	Tornadoes of 2008#April 3–5	0	
North Little Rock, Arkansas	EF3	March 31, 2023	2023 Little Rock tornado	0 fatalities (1 indirect), 54 injuries	
Paris, Tennessee	F2	May 4, 2003	Tornado outbreak sequence of May 2003		
Paris, Tennessee	F2	November 15, 2005	Tornado outbreak of November 15, 2005	0 fatalities, 13 injuries	
Phil Campbell, Alabama	F4	April 20, 1920	1920 Starkville MS/Waco AL tornado	88 fatalities, 700 injuries	
Phil Campbell, Alabama	EF5	April 27, 2011	2011 Hackleburg–Phil Campbell tornado	72 fatalities, 145 injuries	
Rainsville, Alabama	F3	March 27, 1994	1994 Palm Sunday tornado outbreak	20 injuries	
Rainsville, Alabama	EF5	April 27, 2011	2011 Rainsville tornado	25 fatalities, unknown injuries	
St. Louis, Missouri
St. Louis, Missouri	F3	March 8, 1871	1871 St. Louis tornado	9 fatalities, 60 injuries	
St. Louis, Missouri	F2	January 12, 1890		4 fatalities, 15 injuries	St. Louis tornado history
St. Louis, Missouri	F4	May 27, 1896	1896 St. Louis–East St. Louis tornado	255 fatalities, 1000 injuries	
St. Louis, Missouri	F2	August 19, 1904		3 fatalities, 10 injuries	St. Louis tornado history
St. Louis, Missouri	F3	September 29, 1927	1927 St. Louis–East St. Louis tornado	72-79+ fatalities, 550+ injuries	
St. Louis, Missouri	F4	February 10, 1959	St. Louis tornado outbreak of February 1959	21 fatalities, 345 injuries	
St. Louis, Missouri	F2	May 1, 1983		3 injuries	St. Louis tornado history
St. Louis, Missouri	EF4	April 22, 2011	2011 St. Louis tornado	0 fatalities, some injuries	
St. Louis, Missouri	EF3	May 31, 2013	Tornado outbreak of May 26–31, 2013	2 injuries	
St. Louis, Missouri	EF3	May 16, 2025	2025 St. Louis tornado	5 fatalities, 38 injuries	
Selmer, Tennessee	EF2	May 2, 2010	Tornado outbreak of April 30 – May 2, 2010	0 fatalities, 12 injuries	
Selmer, Tennessee	EF3	April 3, 2025	Tornado outbreak and floods of April 2–7, 2025	5 fatalities, 14 injuries	
Tanner, Alabama	F5	April 3, 1974	1974 Tanner tornadoes	28 (267 injured)	
Tanner, Alabama	F5	April 3, 1974	1974 Tanner tornadoes	16 (190 injured)	
Tanner, Alabama	EF5	April 27, 2011	2011 Hackleburg–Phil Campbell tornado	71 (145 injured)	
Tallahassee, Florida	EF2	May 10, 2024	2024 Tallahassee tornadoes	1	
Tallahassee, Florida	EF2	May 10, 2024	2024 Tallahassee tornadoes	1	
Toledo, Ohio	F4	April 11, 1965	1965 Palm Sunday tornado outbreak	16 (207 injuries)	
Toledo, Ohio	EF2	June 15, 2023	Tornado outbreak sequence of June 14–19, 2023#June 15 event	0	
Tuscaloosa, Alabama	F4	March 21, 1932	1932 Deep South tornado outbreak	37 fatalities, 200 injuries	
Tuscaloosa, Alabama	F4	February 23, 1975		1 fatality, 49 injuries	
Tuscaloosa, Alabama	F3	November 20, 1988		8 injuries	
Tuscaloosa, Alabama	F4	December 16, 2000	2000 Tuscaloosa tornado	11 fatalities, 144 injuries	
Tuscaloosa, Alabama	EF4	April 27, 2011	2011 Tuscaloosa–Birmingham tornado	64 (+8 indirect) fatalities, 1,500 injuries	
Vilonia, Arkansas	EF2	April 25, 2011	2011 Ferndale–Vilonia tornado	4 (16 injuries)	
Vilonia, Arkansas	EF4	April 27, 2014	2014 Mayflower–Vilonia tornado	16 (193 injuries)	
Birmingham, United Kingdom	F3	June 14, 1931	1931 Birmingham tornado	1 (10 injuries)	
Birmingham, United Kingdom	F2	June 28, 1968		0	
Birmingham, United Kingdom	IF3	July 28, 2005	2005 Birmingham tornado	0 fatalities, 39 injuries	
London, United Kingdom	F3	December 8, 1954	1954 London tornado	0 fatalities, 30+ injuries	
London, United Kingdom	F2	December 7, 2006	2006 London tornado	0 fatalities, 6 injuries	
Valla, Veneto, Italy	IF5	July 24, 1930	1930 Montello tornado	23 fatalities, 110 injuries	
Valla, Veneto, Italy	IF3	June 6, 2009	2009 Valla Tornado	28 injuries	
Candói, Paraná	F4	November 7, 2025	2025 Candói-Guarapuava Tornado	1 fatality, 20 injuries	
Candói, Paraná	F2	August 8, 2026	2026 Candói Tornado	0	
Kushva, Russia	IF2	July 10, 2019	2019 Kushva Tornado	0	
Kushva, Russia	IF4	June 22, 2026	2026 Kushva Tornado	16 injuries	
Cologne, Germany	F3	October 7, 1434	1434 Cologne tornado		
Cologne, Germany	F4	August 7, 1898	1898 Cologne tornado	3 fatalities, 100 injuries	
Cologne, Germany	IF2	December 21, 2023	2023 Cologne tornado	2 injuries	
Catania, Italy	IF5	October 7, 1884	1884 Catania tornado	28 fatalities, 600 injuries	
Catania, Italy	IF2	December 14, 2009	2009 Catania tornado	1 fatality, 3 injuries	
Diso, Italy	IF4	September 10, 1832	1832 Depressa to otranto tornado	35 fatalities, 63 injuries	
Diso, Italy	IF2	February 3, 2012	2012 Marina di Andrano to Poggiardo tornado	0	
Marittima, Italy	IF2	February 3, 2012	2012 Marina di Andrano to Poggiardo tornado	0	
Marittima, Italy	IF2.5	November 25, 2018	2018 Tricase to Uggiano La Chiesa tornado	0	
Sava, Italy	IF4	September 21, 1897	1897 Sava tornado	59 fatalities, 267 injuries	
Sava, Italy	IF3	August 19, 1976	1976 Sava tornado	4 injuries	
Rome, Italy	F2	June 12, 1749	1749 Ostia to Rome tornado	2 fatalities, 11 injuries	
Rome, Italy	F2	October 29, 1861	Vatican City to northwestern Rome tornado	0	
Ostia, Italy	F2	June 12, 1749	1749 Ostia to Rome tornado	2 fatalities, 11 injuries	
Ostia, Italy	IF2.5	October 29, 1961	1961 Idroscalo to Ostia tornado	15 injuries	
Piazza Vecchia, Italy	F4	September 11, 1970	1970 Treponti to Cavallino tornado	36 fatalities, 245 injuries	
Piazza Vecchia, Italy	IF4	July 8, 2015	2015 Dolo to Piazza Vecchia tornado	1 Fatality, 72 injuries	
Paris, France	F2	July 26, 1896	July 1896 Paris tornado	1 Fatality	
Paris, France	F2	September 10, 1896	September 1896 Paris tornado	5 fatalities, 70 injuries	

== See also ==
- Lists of tornadoes and tornado outbreaks
- Tornado records
