= St. Louis tornado history =

History of tornadoes near St. Louis, Missouri, USA

Tornadoes recorded during all months from 1950 to 2004 in the county warning area of NWS St. Louis. Note that the tornadoes are rated using the Fujita scale.

There is a long history of destructive tornadoes in the city of St. Louis, Missouri and its metropolitan areas. The third-deadliest, and the costliest in United States history, the 1896 St. Louis–East St. Louis tornado, injured more than one thousand people and caused at least 255 fatalities in the City of St. Louis and in East St. Louis. The second-costliest tornado also occurred in St. Louis in September 1927. More tornado fatalities occurred in St. Louis than any other city in the United States. Also noteworthy is that destructive tornadoes occur in winter and autumn, as well as the typical months of spring. Additionally, damaging tornadoes occur in the morning and late at night, as well as the more common late afternoon to early evening maximum period.

In April 2011, an EF4 tornado on Good Friday caused widespread damage along a 22 mi (35 km) track across the northern part of the St. Louis metropolitan area; including significant damage to Lambert International Airport, causing a complete shutdown for over 24 hours, but no deaths. Prior to that event, a F4 tornado also struck the northern metro, and killed three in January 1967. Another F4 tornado struck the Granite City and Edwardsville, Illinois area in April 1981. During a major outbreak in December 2021, two tornadoes in the metro area killed 7 people. An EF3 tornado damaged approximately 5000 structures from the west-central to northeast edges of the city, including Forest Park, the Central West End, and North City, on the afternoon of May 16, 2025. Four fatalities and about 38 injuries were caused by the tornado and the straight-line winds from the supercell caused another fatality in South City.

== City of St. Louis tornadoes ==
Date	Location	Rating	Casualties	Notes
March 8, 1871	St. Louis - East St. Louis - St. Clair County, Illinois	F3	9 fatalities, 60 injuries	See: 1871 St. Louis tornado
March 29, 1872	7th Street	F1	2 possible fatalities, 8 injuries	
January 12, 1890	St. Louis - Madison County, Illinois	F2	4 fatalities, 15 injuries	
May 27, 1896	St. Louis - East St. Louis - St. Clair County	F4	255 fatalities, 1000 injuries	Costliest and third-deadliest tornado in U.S. history (see: 1896 St. Louis–East St. Louis tornado)
August 19, 1904	St. Louis - Madison County	F2	3 fatalities, 10 injuries	
September 29, 1927	Webster Groves - St. Louis	F3	72-79+ fatalities, 550+ injuries	2nd-costliest. and among top 30 deadliest tornado in U.S. history (see: 1927 St. Louis–East St. Louis tornado)
September 16, 1958	St. Louis	F1	0 fatalities	
February 10, 1959	Crescent - St. Louis - Madison County	F4	21 fatalities, 345 injuries	Very similar path to 1871, 1896, 1927 tornadoes. (see: St. Louis tornado outbreak of February 1959)
May 1, 1983	St. Louis - Madison County	F2	3 injuries	
March 31, 2007	Midtown St. Louis	EF0	5 injuries	Late-March 2007 tornado outbreak
December 31, 2010	North St. Louis	EF1	0 fatalities	2010 New Year's Eve tornado outbreak
April 22, 2011	Riverview, St. Louis	EF4	0 fatalities, some injuries	2011 St. Louis tornado during tornado outbreak sequence of April 19–24, 2011
April 10, 2013	The Hill, St. Louis	EF0	0 fatalities	
May 31, 2013	Riverview, St. Louis	EF3	2 injuries	St. Charles County to St. Louis County to extreme northern St. Louis City at 32.5 mi (52.3 km) over 35 min with max width 1 mi (1.6 km) (see: Tornado outbreak of May 26–31, 2013)
May 16, 2025	Wydown/Skinker, Forest Park, Skinker DeBaliviere, DeBaliviere Place, Central West End, Academy, Fountain Park, The Ville, Greater Ville, O'Fallon, North Riverfront	EF3	4 fatalities, 38 injuries	2025 St. Louis tornado in path up to 1.8 mi (2.9 km) wide in North City, damaging over 5000 structures and causing over $1.6 billion in estimated damage. Numerous trees were downed in Forest Park, Fairground Park, and O'Fallon Park. This tornado began near Clayton and continued across the Mississippi River, ending near Granite City, Illinois, upon which a smaller tornado formed from the parent storm.

== Greater St. Louis-area tornadoes ==
These tables describe the tornado history for Greater St. Louis. In Missouri, this includes the counties of St. Louis, St. Charles, Franklin, and Jefferson. In Illinois, this includes the counties of Madison, St. Clair, and Monroe. Data for the independent city of St. Louis is not part of these tables unless part of the path of the tornado striking these counties also struck the city.

=== 1870–1950 ===
Date	Location	Counties	Rating	Casualties	Notes
July 13, 1870		St. Clair			
March 8, 1871		St. Louis City, St. Clair	F3	9 fatalities, 60 injuries	1871 St. Louis tornado
June 30, 1877		St. Louis			
May 18, 1878		St. Louis			
January 12, 1890		St. Louis			
March 27, 1890		St. Clair			Tornado outbreak of March 27, 1890
May 27, 1896	St. Louis, East St. Louis, IL	St. Louis City, Madison	F4	255+ fatalities, 1000+ injuries	1896 St. Louis–East St. Louis tornado
May 27, 1896	New Baden, IL	St. Clair, Clinton	F4	24 fatalities, 125 injuries	Tornado outbreak sequence of May 1896
May 14, 1909		St. Louis			
September 29, 1927		St. Louis	F3	72-79+ fatalities, 550+ injuries	Tornado outbreak of September 29, 1927
September 1, 1931		St. Louis			
March 15, 1938		St. Clair			
March 15, 1938		St. Clair			
May 21, 1949		St. Louis			
May 21, 1949		St. Louis			

=== 1950s ===
Date	Location	Counties	Rating	Casualties	Notes
January 3, 1950		St. Louis	F3		
May 24, 1952		St. Clair			Tornado outbreak of May 21–24, 1952
March 25, 1954		St. Louis			
October 6, 1955		St. Clair			
October 6, 1955		St. Clair			
February 24, 1956	Pacific, MO, Lebanon, IL	St. Louis, St. Clair	F4	6 fatalities, 36 injuries	Traveled 77.6 miles (124.9 km).
February 25, 1956	Pacific, MO	St. Clair	F1	None	
August 30, 1956		St. Louis			
September 15, 1956		St. Clair			
April 25, 1957		St. Clair			
May 9, 1957		St. Louis			
May 21, 1957		St. Clair			May 1957 Central Plains tornado outbreak sequence
May 22, 1957		St. Louis			May 1957 Central Plains tornado outbreak sequence
April 5, 1958		St. Clair			
April 23, 1958		St. Louis			
May 3, 1958		St. Louis			
May 3, 1958		St. Clair			
May 31, 1958		St. Clair			
June 1, 1958		St. Clair			
February 10, 1959	Southeastern Florissant, MO	St. Louis	F0	None	St. Louis tornado outbreak of February 1959: Minor damage to homes.
February 10, 1959	Sherman, MO, Warson Woods, MO	St. Louis	F4	21 fatalities, 345 injuries	St. Louis tornado outbreak of February 1959: Damaged or destroyed numerous structures, ripped part of the roof of the St. Louis Arena, and blew down a TV tower before causing catastrophic damage in Downtown St. Louis.
May 10, 1959		St. Clair			

=== 1960–1980 ===
Date	Location	Counties	Rating	Casualties	Notes
March 29, 1960		St. Clair			
September 24, 1961		St. Clair			
January 24, 1967		St. Louis	F4	3 deaths, 216 injured	Fourth-worst tornado in history to hit the St. Louis Metropolitan Area, last F4 tornado to affect St. Louis County or City until April 22, 2011. See 1967 St. Louis tornado outbreak.
August 3, 1967		St. Clair			
October 24, 1967		St. Louis			
April 3, 1968		St. Clair			
May 15, 1968		St. Clair			Tornado outbreak of May 1968
August 15, 1968		St. Louis			
June 1, 1970		St. Louis			
May 7, 1973		St. Louis			
May 26, 1973		St. Louis			
June 4, 1973		St. Clair			
March 7, 1975		St. Louis			
March 20, 1976		St. Clair			
February 23, 1977		St. Louis			
May 12, 1978		St. Louis			

=== 1980–2000 ===
Date	Location	Counties	Rating	Casualties	Notes
April 7, 1980	St. Charles	St. Charles & St. Louis	F3		A tornado causing F3 damaged affected St. Louis and St. Charles counties producing 2.5 million dollars in damage
April 3, 1981	Edwardsville	Madison	F4		
May 1, 1983		St. Clair			
April 3, 1984		St. Clair			
May 25, 1984		St. Clair			
November 15, 1988		St. Clair			
November 15, 1988		St. Clair			
November 26, 1990		St. Clair			
May 10, 1991		St. Clair			
May 11, 1991		St. Clair			
July 4, 1992		St. Clair			
May 9, 1995		St. Clair			Tornado outbreak sequence of May 6–27, 1995
May 18, 1995		St. Clair			Tornado outbreak sequence of May 6–27, 1995
May 18, 1995		St. Clair			Tornado outbreak sequence of May 6–27, 1995
April 19, 1996		St. Clair			Tornado outbreak sequence of April 1996
June 10, 1996		St. Louis			
April 13, 1998		St. Louis			
April 15, 1998		St. Clair, Madison			Tornado outbreak of April 15–16, 1998
April 15, 1998		St. Clair			Tornado outbreak of April 15–16, 1998

=== 2000—present ===
Date	Location	Counties	Rating	Casualties	Notes
June 24, 2000		St. Clair		0 fatalities, 0 injuries	
April 10, 2001		St. Louis		0 fatalities, 0 injuries	Tornado outbreak of April 10–11, 2001
April 27, 2002		St. Clair		0 fatalities, 0 injuries	Tornado outbreak of April 27–28, 2002
June 10, 2003		St. Clair		0 fatalities, 0 injuries	
June 10, 2003		St. Clair		0 fatalities, 0 injuries	
June 10, 2003		St. Clair		0 fatalities, 0 injuries	
June 10, 2003		St. Clair		0 fatalities, 0 injuries	
November 27, 2005	Webster Groves, Maplewood	St. Louis	F0	0 fatalities, 0 injuries	Late-November 2005 tornado outbreak
January 2, 2006	Creve Coeur	St. Louis	F1	0 fatalities, 0 injuries	
March 11, 2006	Festus, Missouri	Jefferson	F3	0 fatalities, 0 injuries	Tornado outbreak sequence of March 9–13, 2006
April 2, 2006	Fairview Heights, O'Fallon, Illinois	St. Clair	F2		Tornado outbreak of April 2, 2006
July 23, 2006	Troy, Illinois	Madison	F1	0 fatalities, 0 injuries	2006 St. Louis Derecho
June 8, 2009		St. Clair	EF2	0 fatalities, 0 injuries	
December 31, 2010	Byrnes Mill	Jefferson		0 fatalities, 0 injuries	2010 New Year's Eve tornado outbreak
December 31, 2010	Fenton	St. Louis		0 fatalities, 0 injuries	2010 New Year's Eve tornado outbreak
December 31, 2010	Ballwin	St. Louis		0 fatalities, 0 injuries	2010 New Year's Eve tornado outbreak
December 31, 2010	Sunset Hills, Missouri	St. Louis	EF3	1 fatalities, 6 injuries	2010 New Year's Eve tornado outbreak
February 27, 2011	Troy, Illinois	Madison	EF1	0 fatalities, 0 injuries	
April 22, 2011	Foristell, New Melle, Maryland Heights, Bridgeton, St. Ann, Edmundson, Kinloch, Berkeley, Ferguson, Dellwood, Bellefontaine Neighbors, Moline Acres, Riverview, St. Louis, Pontoon Beach, Granite City	St. Charles, St. Louis, St. Louis City, St. Clair, Madison	EF4	0 fatalities, some injuries	2011 St. Louis tornado
April 10, 2013	St. Albans	Franklin	EF1	0 fatalities, 0 injuries	
April 10, 2013	Bridgeton, Hazelwood, Florissant	St. Louis	EF2	0 fatalities, 0 injuries	
May 31, 2013	Harvester, Earth City, Bridgeton, Ferguson, Bellefontaine Neighbors, St. Louis	St. Charles, St. Louis, St. Louis City	EF3	0 fatalities, 2 injuries	Tornado outbreak of May 26–31, 2013
May 31, 2013	South Roxanna	Madison	EF3	0 fatalities, 0 injuries	Tornado outbreak of May 26–31, 2013
May 31, 2013	Byrnes Mill, Scotsdale	Jefferson	EF1	0 fatalities, 0 injuries	Tornado outbreak of May 26–31, 2013
May 31, 2013		Franklin	EF1	0 fatalities, 0 injuries	Tornado outbreak of May 26–31, 2013
April 3, 2014	Olivette, University City	St. Louis	EF1	0 fatalities, 0 injuries	
June 7, 2014	St. Peters	St. Charles	EF0	0 fatalities, 0 injuries	
June 28, 2015		St. Charles	EF2	0 fatalities, 0 injuries	
April 26, 2016	WSW of New Melle	St. Charles	EF0	0 fatalities, 0 injuries	
March 6, 2017	Wentzville	St. Charles	EF1	0 fatalities, 3 injuries	Tornado outbreak of March 6–7, 2017
April 29, 2017	Orchard Farm	St. Charles	EF0	0 fatalities, 0 injuries	Tornado outbreak and floods of April 28 – May 1, 2017
May 21, 2019	Augusta	Franklin, St. Charles	EF1	0 fatalities, 0 injuries	Tornado outbreak of May 20–23, 2019
March 27, 2021	St. Jacob, Highland	Madison	EF1	0 fatalities, 0 injuries	Tornado outbreak sequence of March 24–28, 2021
December 10, 2021	Chesterfield, Maryland Heights	St. Charles, St. Louis	EF3	1 fatality, 2 injuries	Tornado outbreak of December 10-11, 2021
December 10, 2021	Pontoon Beach, Edwardsville	Madison	EF3	6 fatalities, 1 injury	Edwardsville Amazon warehouse collapse
May 19, 2022		Franklin	EF0	0 fatalities, 0 injuries	
May 19, 2022		Franklin	EF1	0 fatalities, 0 injuries	
May 19, 2022		St. Louis	EF0	0 fatalities, 0 injuries	
May 19, 2022	Kirkwood, Glendale, Warson Woods, Ladue	St. Louis	EF0	0 fatalities, 0 injuries	
May 19, 2022	Frontenac, Creve Coeur	St. Louis	EF0	0 fatalities, 0 injuries	
May 19, 2022		St. Louis	EF0	0 fatalities, 0 injuries	
May 19, 2022		St. Clair	EF0	0 fatalities, 0 injuries	
April 15, 2023	Hillsboro	Jefferson	EF1	0 fatalities, 0 injuries	
April 15, 2023	Festus, Herculaneum	Jefferson	EF0	0 fatalities, 1 injuries	
April 15, 2023	Pevely	Jefferson	EF1	0 fatalities, 0 injuries	
April 15, 2023	Valley Park, Fenton, Sunset Hills	St. Louis	EF1	0 fatalities, 0 injuries	
April 15, 2023		Monroe	EFU	0 fatalities, 0 injuries	
April 15, 2023		Monroe	EF0	0 fatalities, 0 injuries	
April 15, 2023	Maeystown	Monroe, St. Clair	EF1	0 fatalities, 0 injuries	
April 15, 2023	Belleville	St. Clair	EF0	0 fatalities, 0 injuries	
April 15, 2023	Belleville, Swansea	St. Clair	EF0	0 fatalities, 0 injuries	
April 15, 2023	Belleville, Shiloh	St. Clair	EF1	0 fatalities, 0 injuries	
May 13, 2023		Madison	EFU	0 fatalities, 0 injuries	
August 13, 2023		Monroe	EF0	0 fatalities, 0 injuries	
March 14, 2024	Charlack	St. Louis	EF0	0 fatalities, 0 injuries	
April 1, 2024	Chesterfield	St. Louis	EF0	0 fatalities, 0 injuries	
April 18, 2024	High Ridge	St. Louis, Jefferson	EF1	0 fatalities, 0 injuries	
April 18, 2024	Cahokia Heights	St. Clair	EF0	0 fatalities, 0 injuries	
April 18, 2024		Madison	EF0	0 fatalities, 0 injuries	
April 18, 2024		Madison	EF1	0 fatalities, 0 injuries	
April 18, 2024		Madison	EF0	0 fatalities, 0 injuries	
April 18, 2024		Madison	EF0	0 fatalities, 0 injuries	
May 7, 2024		St. Charles	EF0	0 fatalities, 0 injuries	
May 26, 2024		Jefferson	EF0	0 fatalities, 0 injuries	
May 26, 2024	Oakville, Columbia	St. Louis, Monroe	EF0	0 fatalities, 0 injuries	
April 18, 2024	New Baden, Damiansville	St. Clair, Clinton	EF1	0 fatalities, 0 injuries	
July 16, 2024	Cedar Hill	Jefferson	EF0	0 fatalities, 0 injuries	
November 4, 2024	Foristell, Flint Hill	St. Charles, Lincoln	EF0	0 fatalities, 0 injuries	
March 14, 2025	Union	Franklin	EF1	0 fatalities, 0 injuries	Tornado outbreak of March 13–16, 2025
March 14, 2025		Franklin	EF1	0 fatalities, 0 injuries	Tornado outbreak of March 13–16, 2025
March 14, 2025	Villa Ridge, Gray Summit, Wildwood	Franklin, St. Louis	EF2	0 fatalities, 1 injury	Tornado outbreak of March 13–16, 2025
March 14, 2025	Clarkson Valley, Chesterfield, Maryland Heights, Bridgeton, Hazelwood, Florissant, Old Jamestown	St. Louis	EF2	0 fatalities, 0 injuries	Tornado outbreak of March 13–16, 2025
March 14, 2025	Florissant, Old Jamestown, West Alton, Alton, Godfrey	St. Louis, St. Charles, Madison	EF2	0 fatalities, 0 injuries	Tornado outbreak of March 13–16, 2025
March 14, 2025	Arnold, Imperial, Oakville, Mehlville	Jefferson, St. Louis	EF2	0 fatalities, 0 injuries	Tornado outbreak of March 13–16, 2025
March 14, 2025	Valmeyer, Waterloo	Monroe, St. Clair	EF2	0 fatalities, 0 injuries	Tornado outbreak of March 13–16, 2025
March 14, 2025	O'Fallon	St. Clair, Madison	EF1	0 fatalities, 0 injuries	Tornado outbreak of March 13–16, 2025
March 14, 2025	Mascoutah, Trenton	St. Clair, Clinton	EF2	0 fatalities, 0 injuries	Tornado outbreak of March 13–16, 2025
April 20, 2025		St. Clair	EF0	0 fatalities, 0 injuries	
April 20, 2025	Waterloo	Monroe	EF1	0 fatalities, 0 injuries	
April 20, 2025		Monroe	EF1	0 fatalities, 0 injuries	
April 20, 2025		St. Clair	EF0	0 fatalities, 0 injuries	
May 16, 2025	Richmond Heights, Clayton, St. Louis, Granite City, Pontoon Beach, Edwardsville	St. Louis, City of St. Louis, Madison	EF3	5 fatalities, 38 injuries	2025 St. Louis tornado
May 19, 2025		Jefferson	EFU	0 fatalities, 0 injuries	
June 4, 2025	Wildwood, Chesterfield	St. Louis	EF1	0 fatalities, 0 injuries	
June 7, 2025		Jefferson	EF1	0 fatalities, 0 injuries	

== See also ==
- List of tornadoes and tornado outbreaks
  - List of North American tornadoes and tornado outbreaks
  - List of tornado-related deaths at schools
  - List of tornadoes striking downtown areas
- Tri-State Hailstorm of April 2001
- July 2006 derechoes
