= Tornado outbreaks of mid-to-late May, 1896 =

Extremely devastating windstorm in the United States

Tornado outbreaks of mid-to-late May 1896
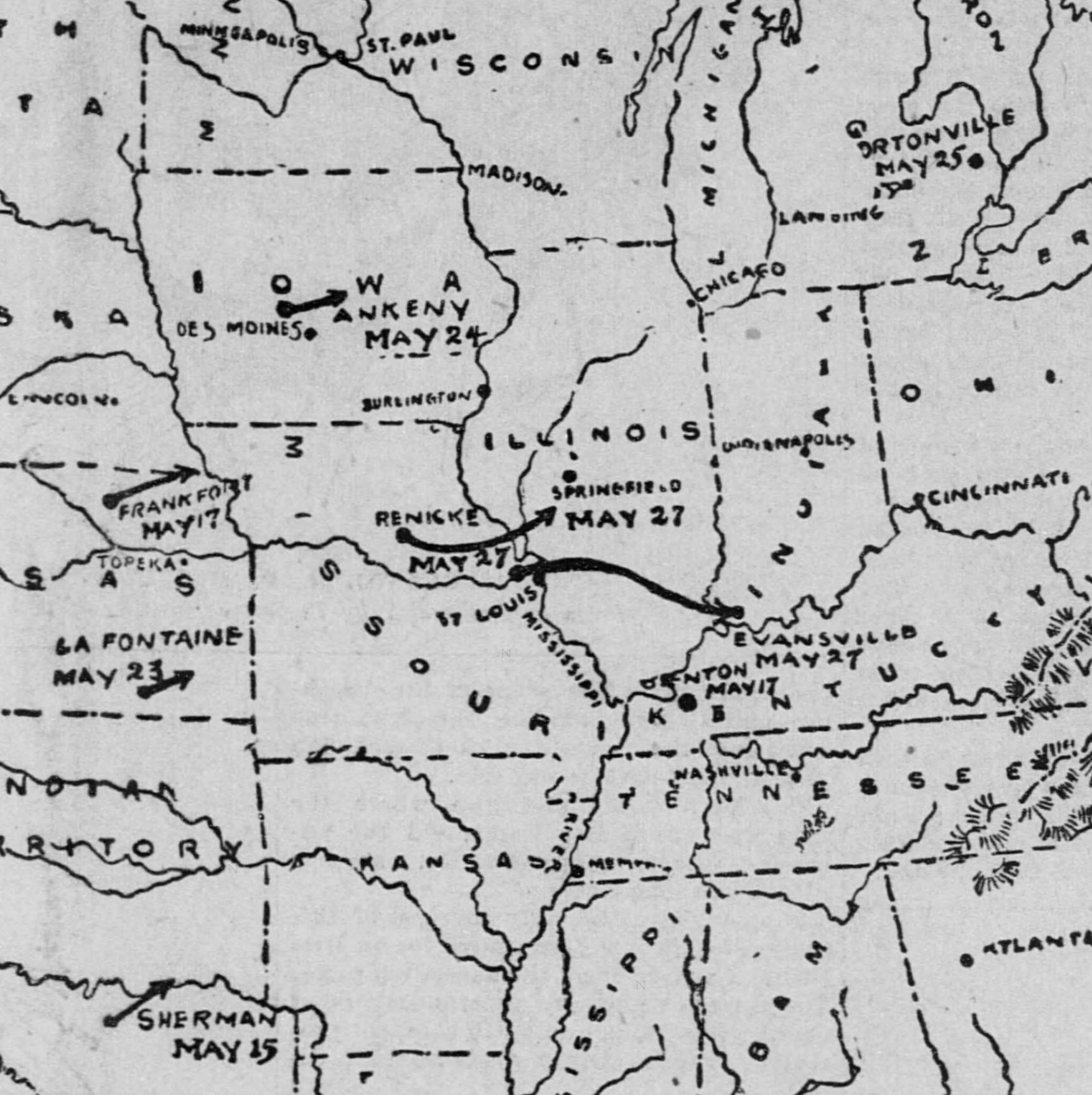
- A newspaper map showing areas that were struck by deadly tornadoes across the two week period.

Meteorological history
- Duration: May 15–28, 1896

Tornado outbreak
- Tornadoes: ≥38
- Max. rating: F5 tornado

Overall effects
- Casualties: ≥501 fatalities, ≥1914 injuries
- Areas affected: Central and Southern United States

The tornado outbreaks of mid-to-late May 1896 were a series of violent and deadly tornado outbreaks that struck much of the Central and Southern United States from May 15 to 28, 1896. It is considered one of the worst stretches of near-continuous tornadic activity on record, with tornado expert Tom Grazulis stating that the week of May 24–28 was "perhaps the most violent single week of tornado activity in United States history." There were four particularly notable tornado outbreaks during the two-week period. The outbreaks produced three F5 tornadoes as well as the third deadliest tornado ever in United States history, which is also the costliest in the United States’ history when damage is normalized. Additionally, at least one tornado crossed into Canada, inflicting more damage there. A total of at least 484 people were killed during the entire two week span by at least 38 different tornadoes which struck Texas, Oklahoma, Kansas, Nebraska, Kentucky, Iowa, Illinois, Michigan, Missouri, Pennsylvania, New Jersey and Maryland. (Note: An outbreak is generally defined as a group of at least six tornadoes (the number sometimes varies slightly according to local climatology) with no more than a six-hour gap between individual tornadoes. An outbreak sequence, prior to (after) modern records that began in 1950, is defined as, at most, two (one) consecutive days without at least one significant (F2 or stronger) tornado.) (Note: All damage totals are in 1896 United States dollars unless otherwise noted.)

== Confirmed tornadoes ==
Possible tornadoes also may have hit Kalkaska, Midland, and Wayne counties, Michigan.

Numerous discrepancies on the details of tornadoes in this outbreak exist between sources. The total count of tornadoes and ratings differs from various agencies accordingly. The list below documents information from the most contemporary official sources alongside assessments from tornado historian Thomas P. Grazulis.

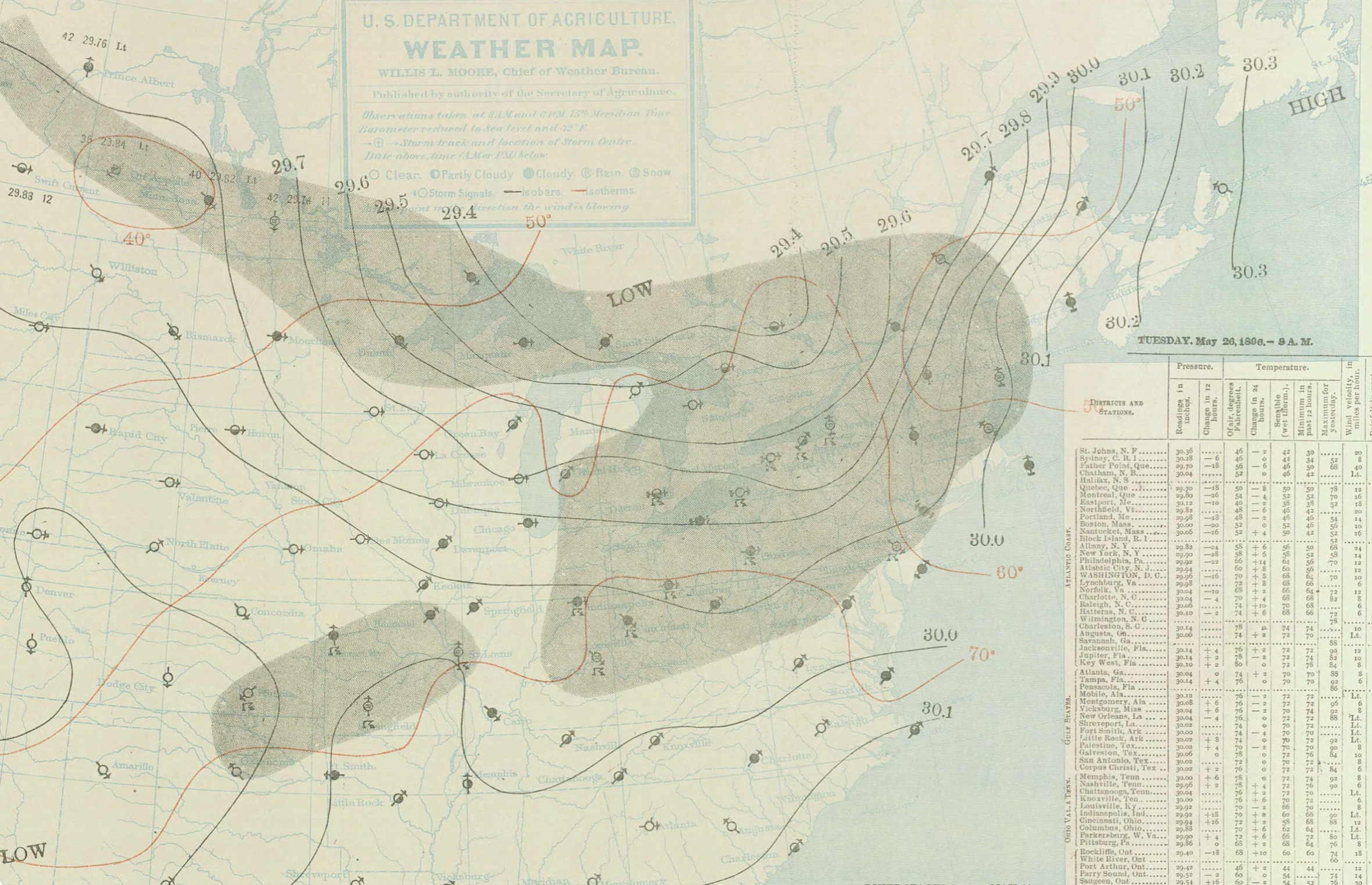
Weather map on May 26, 1896, showing the low pressure system that spawned the tornado outbreak

Confirmed tornadoes by Fujita rating
FU	F0	F1	F2	F3	F4	F5	Total
?	?	?	17	12	6	3	≥38

Outbreak death toll
State/Province	Total	County	County total
Texas	78	Denton	5
Texas	78	Grayson	73
Oklahoma	4	Bryan	4
Kansas	21	McPherson	1
Kansas	21	Nemaha	15
Kansas	21	Brown	5
Kentucky	5	Marshall	5
Nebraska	4	Richardson	4
Iowa	21	Polk	7
Iowa	21	Jasper	14
Illinois	166	Ogle	7
Illinois	166	Madison	118
Illinois	166	Washington	14
Illinois	166	Jefferson	~3
Illinois	166	St. Clair	10
Illinois	166	Clinton	14
Michigan	50	Tuscola	1
Michigan	50	Macomb	~1
Michigan	50	St. Clair	~1
Michigan	50	Oakland	39
Michigan	50	Genesee	3
Michigan	50	Unknown	5
Missouri	146	Montgomery	1
Missouri	146	Audrain	6
Missouri	146	Osage	2
Missouri	146	St. Louis	137
Pennsylvania	5	Lancaster	1
Pennsylvania	5	Montgomery	2
Pennsylvania	5	Bucks	2
Totals	~500		

=== May 15 event ===
List of confirmed tornadoes – May 15, 1896
F#	Location	County	Time (UTC)	Path length	Damage
Texas
F3	SW of Justin to E of Ponder	Denton	2015	13 miles (21 km)	2 deaths — A total of 22 homes were damaged in Justin, with five destroyed, and two swept away. Every business in town received some degree of damage. There were 25 injuries, including 17 that were serious.
F2	W of Denton	Denton, Cooke	2045	17 miles (27 km)	3 deaths — Struck the town of Gribble Springs, where seven houses were destroyed and three people were killed. Two homes and numerous barns were also destroyed in Cooke County.
F5	E of Pilot Point to Sherman	Denton, Grayson	2230	28 miles (45 km)	73 deaths — See article on this tornado — One of the most intense tornadoes ever recorded.
F2	SE of Sherman to SE of Hendrix, OK	Grayson, Bryan(OK)	2245	18 miles (29 km)	Tornado formed after the Sherman tornado lifted. A total of 20 homes were damaged along the Choctaw Creek (then called Choctaw Bayou) and a trading post was destroyed. There were 35 injuries, of which, at least 20 were serious.
Oklahoma
F2	Blue area	Bryan	2330	unknown	4 deaths — A family of four was killed in their home.
Kansas
F2	NE of Moundridge	McPherson	1000	unknown	1 death — Brief, early-morning touchdown leveled a house. An elderly man was killed and his wife was injured.
Sources: Grazulis (1993)

=== May 17 event ===
List of confirmed tornadoes – May 17, 1896
F#	Location	County	Time (UTC)	Path length	Damage
Kentucky
F2	N of Symsonia	Graves, Marshall	0645	8 miles (13 km)	5 deaths — South of Elva, a small two-room home was obliterated, killing a family of five.
Kansas
F3	NW of Clay Center to S of Frankfort	Clay, Marshall, Riley	2230	45 miles (72 km)	Probably a long-lived tornado family. Seven farms were destroyed and 60 injuries were reported, 58 of which occurred when a church in Riley County was destroyed during services.
F5	SW of Palmer to S of Falls City, NE	Washington, Marshall, Nemaha, Brown, Richardson(NE)	2300	100 miles (160 km)	25 deaths — See section on this tornado — Was more than 2 miles (3.2 km) wide.
Sources: Grazulis (1993)

=== May 18 event ===
List of confirmed tornadoes – May 18, 1896
F#	Location	County	Time (UTC)	Path length	Damage
Iowa
F2	SW of Lamoni	Decatur	0200	unknown	A cottage on the southwest side of Lamoni was leveled and scattered. Four people were injured.
Sources: Grazulis (1993)

=== May 19 event ===
List of confirmed tornadoes – May 19, 1896
F#	Location	County	Time (UTC)	Path length	Damage
Kansas
F3	SW of Rock	Cowley, Butler	2200	10 miles (16 km)	Buildings were destroyed on 15 farms, including seven homes. A total of 50 head of livestock were killed on one farm, and two people were injured.
Sources: Grazulis (1993)

=== May 20 event ===
List of confirmed tornadoes – May 20, 1896
F#	Location	County	Time (UTC)	Path length	Damage
Oklahoma
F3	E of Newkirk to E of Maitland, KS	Kay, Cowley(KS)	1700	15 miles (24 km)	An entire farm was swept away near the beginning of the path.
F2	N of Kildare	Kay	1730	unknown	A barn was destroyed. One of six small tornadoes reported in the area.
Kansas
F2	N of Hoyt	Jackson	2230	6 miles (9.7 km)	One person was injured as a house was destroyed.
F2	S of Emporia	Lyon	0200	3 miles (4.8 km)	A house was shifted from its foundation and unroofed. A barn was destroyed, and two men hiding inside were injured.
Sources: Grazulis (1993)

=== May 24 event ===
List of confirmed tornadoes – May 24, 1896
F#	Location	County	Time (UTC)	Path length	Damage
Iowa
F2	S of Manchester	Delaware	0300	3 miles (4.8 km)	One house and several barns were destroyed. A fatality may have occurred.
F4	SW of Polk City to Mingo	Polk, Jasper	0430	28 miles (45 km)	21 deaths — A violent tornado began near Polk City, and moved east-southeast north of Des Moines. Several homes were leveled on the north sides of Bondurant and Valeria, resulting in fatalities. Other homes were destroyed and fatalities occurred in the communities of Santiago and Mingo. A steel railroad rail was driven 15 feet (4.6 m) into the ground at one location. At least 60 people were injured.
Sources: Grazulis (1993)

=== May 25 event ===
List of confirmed tornadoes – May 25, 1896
F#	Location	County	Time (UTC)	Path length	Damage
Illinois
F4	NW of Forreston to S of Egan	Ogle	0700	10 miles (16 km)	4 deaths — Homes had their roofs torn off on the northern edge of Adeline. In rural areas, a church and five farm homes were leveled. Four fatalities occurred south of Egan, where a large home was cleanly swept away.
F2	S of Byron	Ogle	0730	unknown	All barns and trees were destroyed on a farm.
F3	S of Davis Junction to E of Irene	Ogle, Boone, DeKalb	0730	15 miles (24 km)	3 deaths — Buildings were destroyed on 11 farms. Six people were injured and three others were killed in a collapsed home. Debris from that home was found five miles away. A barn was destroyed in DeKalb County as well.
F3	Edison Park	Cook	0750	4.5 miles (7.2 km)	Tornado struck the communities of Park Ridge, Edison Park, and Norwood Park. Six homes were destroyed and 30 others were damaged beyond repair. Caused $100,000 in damage and hit within 15 miles (24 km) of Downtown Chicago.
Michigan
F2	N of Clio to E of Otter Lake	Genesee, Lapeer	2300	14 miles (23 km)	Businesses and cottages were destroyed at Otter Lake. Three farm homes were destroyed, and the roof of a school was carried for half a mile. Four people were injured.
F3	W of Munger to Fairgrove area	Bay, Tuscola	2300	10 miles (16 km)	1 death — A school and five homes were destroyed along the path. A total of 30 people were attending a funeral at one of the homes, and the attendants survived by taking shelter in a nearby ditch as the house was lifted and destroyed. One man was killed by flying debris as he watched from his window.
F3	W of Sterling Heights to Harrison Township	Macomb, St. Clair	0110	35 miles (56 km)	2 deaths — Homes and barns were leveled between Warren and Utica before the tornado tore through Mt. Clemens, where 30 homes were destroyed along a two-block-wide path. Homes were destroyed in other areas before the tornado crossed into Ontario, where $60,000 in damage occurred.
F5	N of Holly to W of Dryden	Oakland, Lapeer	0200	30 miles (48 km)	47 deaths — See section on this tornado — Extremely intense tornado, second deadliest in Michigan.
F2	Amadore	Sanilac	0200	3 miles (4.8 km)	Every building in the village of Amadore was damaged to some degree, and two homes were destroyed at that location. The tornado then moved out over Lake Huron as a waterspout and dissipated. Three people were injured.
Sources: Grazulis (1993)

=== May 27 event ===
List of confirmed tornadoes – May 27, 1896
F#	Location	County	Time (UTC)	Path length	Damage
Missouri
F2	E of Bellflower	Montgomery, Lincoln	unknown	7 miles (11 km)	1 death — A church and a barn were destroyed. A woman was killed and her infant son was injured.
F2	N of Sturgeon to N of Centralia	Audrain	1935	8 miles (13 km)	Barns were leveled and destroyed and four farm homes were "nearly destroyed".
F3	S of Higbee to S of Renick	Randolph	2030	6 miles (9.7 km)	Three homes were destroyed and five others were damaged. Many barns were destroyed as well. Six people were injured.
F3	N of Mexico to W of Vandalia	Audrain	2115	17 miles (27 km)	6–7 deaths — Three students were killed at the Dye school, and one student (possibly two) was killed at the Bean Creek School. Two others died in farmhouses. A total of 50 people were injured.
F4	SE of Chamois	Osage	0015	5 miles (8.0 km)	2 deaths — Two farms were destroyed, at one of which every building was completely swept away. Three people were injured.
F4	St. Louis/East St. Louis, IL	St.Louis, Madison (IL)	0030	12 miles (19 km)	255 deaths — See article on this tornado — Third-deadliest tornado in US history. It caused near-F5 damage in East St. Louis.
Illinois
F4	E of New Minden to Irvington	Washington, Jefferson	0020	23 miles (37 km)	14 deaths — Entire farms were leveled near New Minden, south of Hoyleton, near Richview, and in Boyd and Irvington. A total 50 other people were injured.
F4	E of Imbs to NE of Germantown	St. Clair, Clinton	0045	30 miles (48 km)	24 deaths — The path of this tornado family may have begun in Dupo. Many homes were leveled along the path, especially in and around New Baden, where 13 people died. Near the beginning of the path, 10 people died near train stations, and another death occurred at a farmhouse near Germantown before the tornado dissipated. 125 people were injured.
F3	NW of Nashville to NE of Mt. Vernon	Washington, Jefferson	0230	28 miles (45 km)	3 deaths — Many farms were devastated along the path. Damage northeast of Mt. Vernon may have been downburst-related.
Oklahoma
F3	E of Hennessey to NE of Marshall	Kingfisher, Logan, Garfield	0000	10 miles (16 km)	A house was blown apart and scattered. One person was injured.
Sources: Grazulis (1993)

=== May 28 event ===
List of confirmed tornadoes – May 28, 1896
F#	Location	County	Time (UTC)	Path length	Damage
Pennsylvania
F2	E of Gettysburg to NE of Hanover	Adams, York	1800	13 miles (21 km)	Barns were destroyed near Bonneauville and Abbottstown. A house was leveled as well, with the furniture carried over half a mile away. Four people were injured.
F2	Columbia/Wrightsville areas	York, Lancaster	1830	9 miles (14 km)	1 death — A school and four homes had their roofs torn off in Wrightsville. One person was killed when the tornado struck a rolling mill in Columbia, where three homes were destroyed. 20 people were injured.
F3	S of Ambler to S of Trenton, NJ	Montgomery, Bucks, Mercer(NJ), Monmouth(NJ)	1955	35 miles (56 km)	4 deaths — A total of 16 barns as well as several stables were destroyed in Pennsylvania, where four people were killed. The tornado crossed into New Jersey and damaged businesses in Allentown and White Horse. 15 people were injured.
Maryland
F2	SW of Harney to Littlestown, PA, area	Carroll, Adams(PA)	2000	5 miles (8.0 km)	In Maryland, a house was torn apart and three others had their roofs torn off. Furniture was carried up to half a mile away. Crossed into Pennsylvania and dissipated near Littlestown, where barns were destroyed.
Sources: Grazulis (1993)

=== Sherman, Texas ===
Sherman, Texas
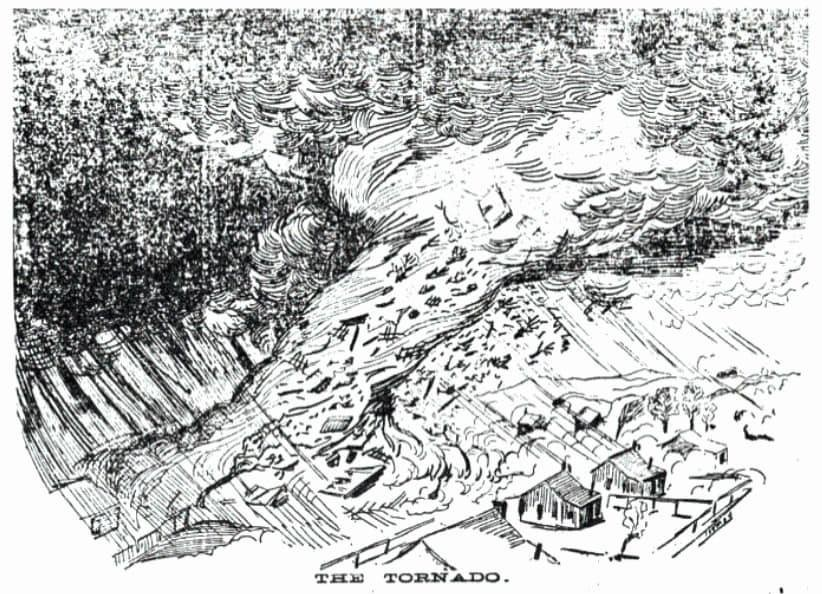
- An artist's rendition of the 1896 Sherman tornado after eye-witnessing the catastrophe

F5 tornado
- on the Fujita scale

Overall effects
- Casualties: ≥73 fatalities, ≥200 injuries
- Areas affected: Northern Dallas/Fort Worth metro

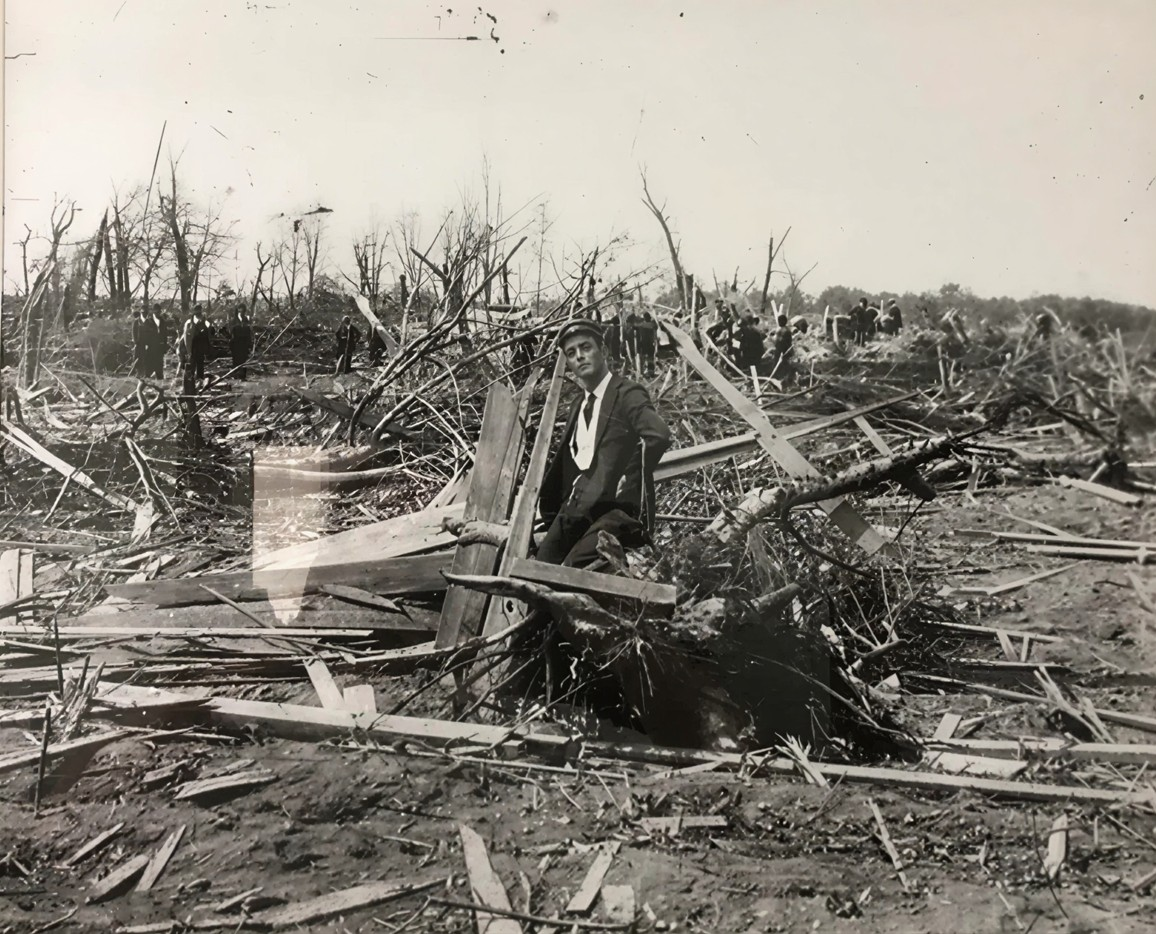
A man standing in the ruins of a home in Sherman, Texas.

On the first day of the outbreak sequence, most of the fatalities came from a single supercell thunderstorm that traveled from Denton to Sherman. This violent, deadly and devastating tornado began in the Pilot Point area, where farm homes were shifted off of their foundations. The tornado widened and strengthened into a very violent F5 and swept away numerous farms west of Farmington and Howe. Later along the path, the tornado narrowed to around 60 yards (180 ft) wide as it tore through Sherman. 50 homes were destroyed in town, 20 of which were obliterated and swept away. An iron-beam bridge was torn from its supports and twisted into pieces, and one of the beams was driven several feet into the ground. Bodies were found up to 400 yards (1,200 ft) from their home sites, and a trunk lid was carried for 35 miles (56 km). Headstones at a cemetery were shattered, and a 500-pound stone was carried for 250 yards. Trees in the area were completely debarked with some reduced to stumps, and grass was scoured from lawns in town. At least 200 people were injured, and bodies of the victims were transported into the courthouse and a vacant building. Several bodies were recovered from a muddy creek. 73 people were killed by this single tornado, one of the worst on record in North Texas and the Red River Valley region, in particular the Texoma region.

Additional killer tornadoes were recorded north of Wichita, Kansas in McPherson County and further south in Bryan County, Oklahoma, also in the Texoma region.

=== Seneca–Oneida, Kansas/Falls City, Nebraska ===
Seneca–Oneida, Kansas/Falls City, Nebraska
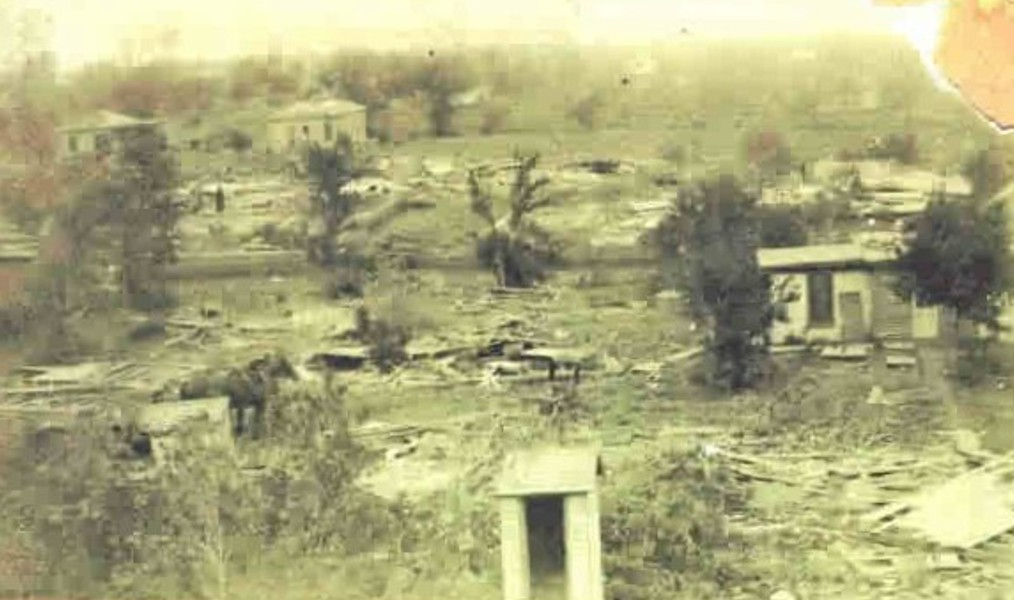
- Damage in Seneca, Kansas after the tornado

F5 tornado
- on the Fujita scale

Overall effects
- Casualties: ≥25 fatalities, ≥200 injuries
- Areas affected: Washington (KS), Marshall (KS), Nemaha (KS), Brown (KS), Richardson (NE) Counties

This powerful F5 tornado, estimated to have been more than 2 miles (3.2 km) wide, tore through the towns of Seneca, Oneida, Reserve and Sabetha, Kansas. In Seneca, the tornado destroyed the courthouse and a new schoolhouse, and the opera house was completely leveled and swept away. Damage in Seneca alone was estimated at $250,000 (1896 USD) where most of the homes, the fairgrounds and other small structures sustained at least heavy damage, if not complete destruction. The damage path was two miles wide at Reserve, and only three buildings were left undamaged at that location. The tornado damaged 50 homes and destroyed 20 others on the north side of Sabetha. Many farms were entirely swept away along the path as well, some of which were reportedly left "as bare as the prairie". The tornado continued into Nebraska, where four people died and damage occurred on the south side of Falls City. At least 200 people were injured.

=== Whigville-Ortonville–Oakwood-Thomas, Michigan ===
Whigville-Ortonville-Oakwood-Thomas, Michigan
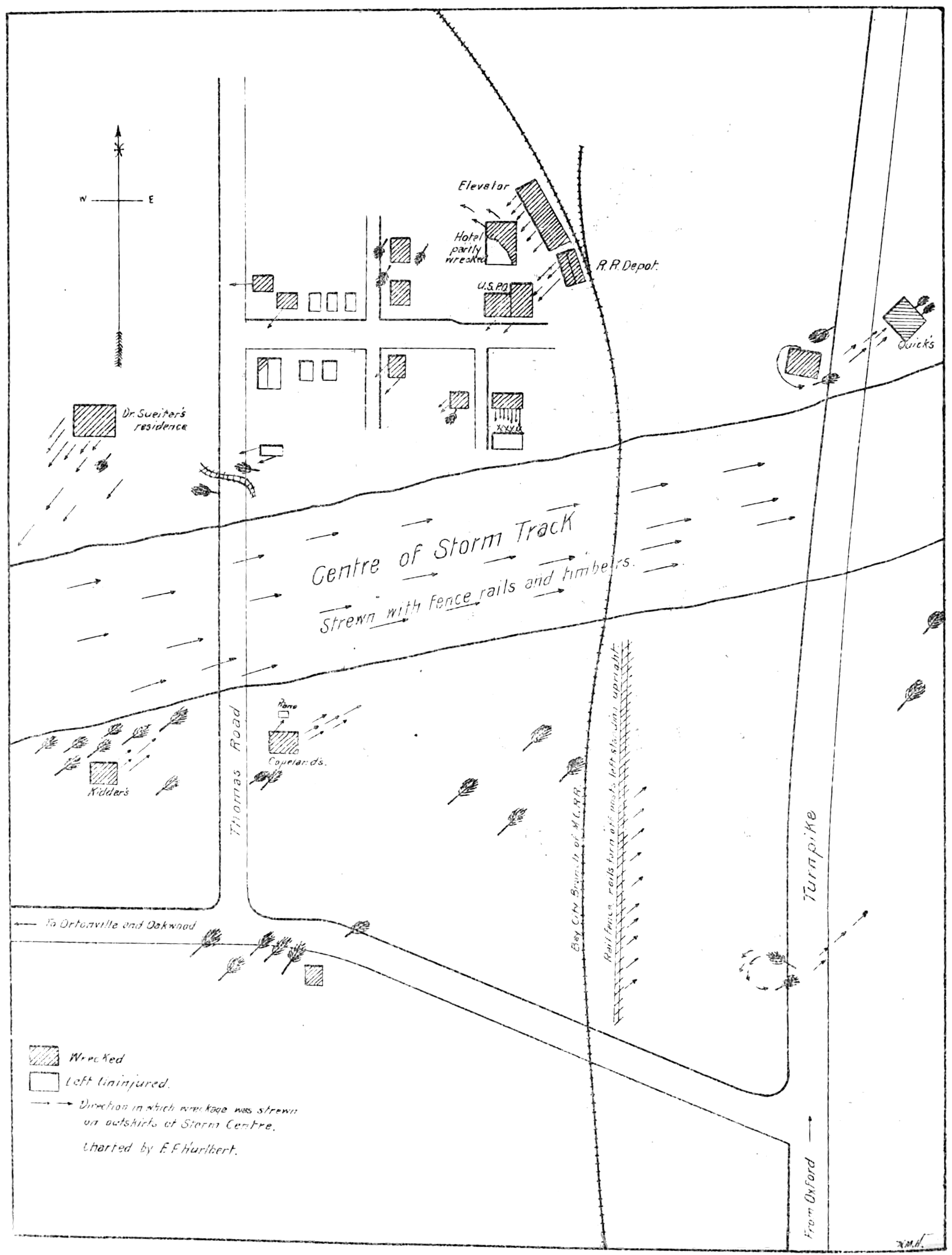
- Sketch of the tornado's path in Thomas, Oakland County, from Conger 1896

Meteorological history
- Date: May 25, 1896

F5 tornado
- on the Fujita scale

Overall effects
- Casualties: ≥47 fatalities, ≥100 injuries
- Damage: $400,000 ($15,480,000 in 2025 USD)
- Areas affected: Oakland, Lapeer, Livingston Counties

Late during the evening hours of May 25, this violent tornado touched down in Eastern Michigan and moved northeast for about 30 miles (48 km). The tornado affected portions of Oakland, Lapeer and Livingston Counties northwest of Detroit. Towns affected included Thomas, Ortonville, Oakwood, and Whigville just after 9:00 pm. Homes were leveled or swept away, and fatalities occurred along the path. Entire farms were leveled, and debris from homes was found up to 12 miles (19 km) away. Trees were completely debarked along the path as well, with even small twigs stripped bare in some cases. Homes were swept away in Thomas, including one that was obliterated with the debris scattered up to 10 miles away. A piano from that residence was found 200 yards away from the foundation, with one end "pounded full of grass". Weather Bureau inspectors reported that grass in the center-most part of the circulation was "pounded down into the earth, as if it had been washed into the earth by a heavy flow of water." At least 100 people were injured. With 47 deaths, this is the second-deadliest tornado ever in Michigan trailing only the Flint Tornado of 1953 which killed 116 in Genesee County just outside Flint. Twenty-two people were killed in Ortonville, ten in Oakwood, three in Thomas, four north of Oxford and three in Whigville with others in rural areas. Nine of the fatalities were in a single home in Ortonville.

Other killer tornadoes on that day touched down in Ogle County, Illinois (two different tornadoes) and Macomb & Tuscola Counties in Michigan. Several homes and farms in the Mount Clemens area were wiped out and others were moved from their foundations. The recently completed Colonial Hotel was leveled. Thirty homes were leveled in total, and two people were killed.

=== St. Louis, Missouri/East St. Louis, Illinois ===
St. Louis, Missouri/East St. Louis, Illinois
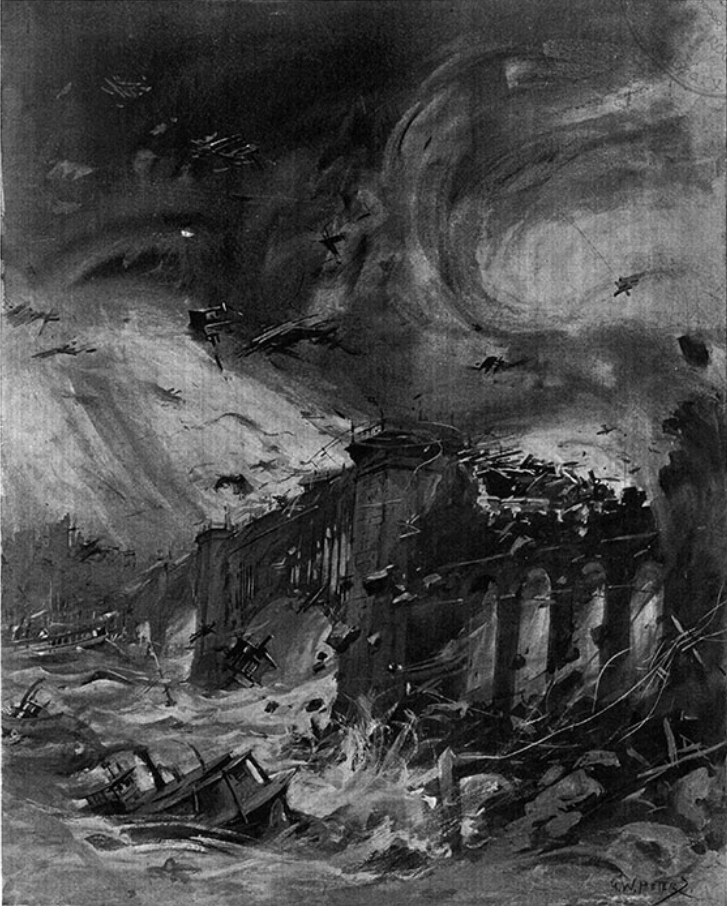
- Harper's Weekly sketch, showing a depiction of the tornado over St. Louis

Meteorological history
- Date: May 27, 1896

F4 tornado
- on the Fujita scale
- Highest winds: 418 km/h (260 mph)

Overall effects
- Casualties: ≥255 fatalities, ≥1000 injuries
- Damage: > $10 million ($387,000,000 in 2025 USD)
- Areas affected: Greater St. Louis

This violent and catastrophic tornado—the third deadliest tornado in the United States’ history—struck the Greater St. Louis area in both Missouri and Illinois. This violent tornado killed at least 255 people (though one estimate placed the death toll at greater than 400), injured at least 1,000 more, and caused more than $10 million in damages. At the time, this was the costliest tornado ever recorded in the United States. It was one of at least 18 tornadoes to occur that day

At least 137 people died as the tornado traversed the core of the downtown area, leaving a continuous, one-mile-wide (1.6 km) swath of destroyed homes, schools, saloons, factories, mills, churches, parks, and railroad yards in its wake. A few of the destroyed homes were all but completely swept away. Numerous trees were downed at the 36-acre (0.15 km^{2}) Lafayette Park, and a barometer recorded a drop to 26.74 inHg (906 hPa) at this location.

After devastating the city of St. Louis, the tornado crossed the Mississippi River and struck the Eads Bridge, where a 2 in × 10 in (51 mm × 254 mm) wooden plank was found driven through a 5/16 in (7.9 mm) wrought iron plate. Uncounted others may have died on boats on the river, which could have swept their bodies downriver where they could not be recorded in the official death toll. The tornado continued into East St. Louis, Illinois, where its path was narrower, but its strength became even more intense. Homes and buildings along the river were completely swept away and a quarter of the buildings there were damaged or destroyed. An additional 118 people were killed, 35 of whom were at the Vandalia railroad freight yards.

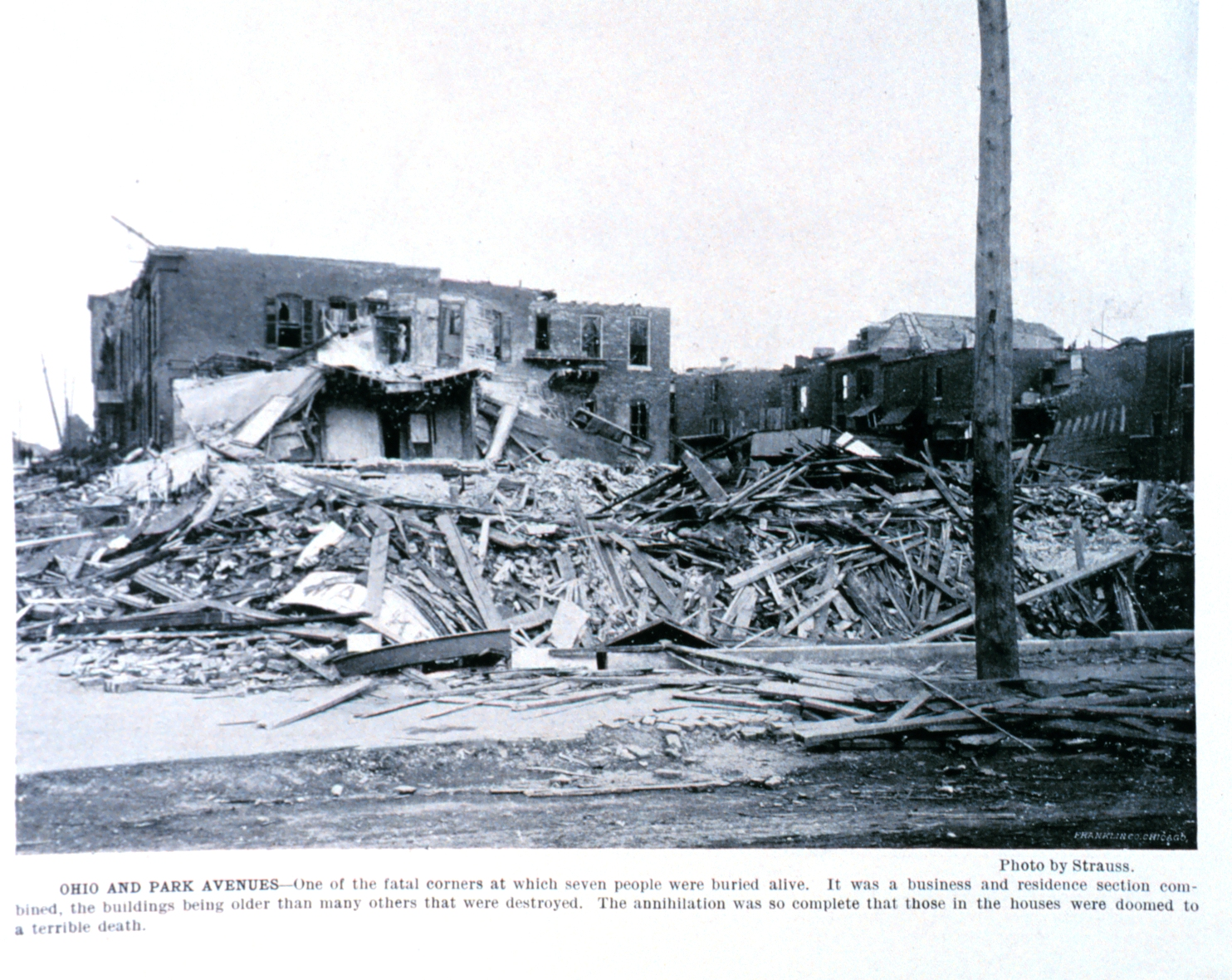
Damage caused by the tornado

== See also ==
- Tornadoes in Oklahoma
- List of North American tornadoes and tornado outbreaks
- St. Louis tornado history
