= 1871 St. Louis tornado =

American meteorological event

Meteorological history
- Formed: March 8, 1871 3:00 P.M. CDT (10:00 A.M. UTC)
- Dissipated: March 8, 1871 3:03 P.M. CDT (10:03 A.M. UTC)
- Duration: 3 minutes

F3 tornado
- on the Fujita scale

Overall effects
- Casualties: 9 fatalities, 60 injuries
- Damage: $1.5 million
- Areas affected: St. Louis, Missouri area

The 1871 St. Louis tornado was an F3 tornado that touched down in St. Louis, Missouri on Wednesday, March 8, 1871, at 3:00 pm. It traveled east-northeast at 70 miles per hour (113 km/h), cutting a swath up to 250 yards (229 m) wide and 5 miles (8 km) long into East St. Louis, Illinois. The tornado was on the ground for 3 minutes. A total of 30 homes were destroyed and 30 severely damaged. Six railroad depots were destroyed with eight deaths in them. One death occurred on a bridge. Overall, 9 people were killed, 60 injured, and $1,500,000 damage occurred. It is one of four tornadoes (1896, 1927, 1959) that have ripped through the central business district of St. Louis.

== See also ==
- List of North American tornadoes and tornado outbreaks
- St. Louis tornado history
