= Tornado outbreak of September 29, 1927 =

Extreme weather event in central US

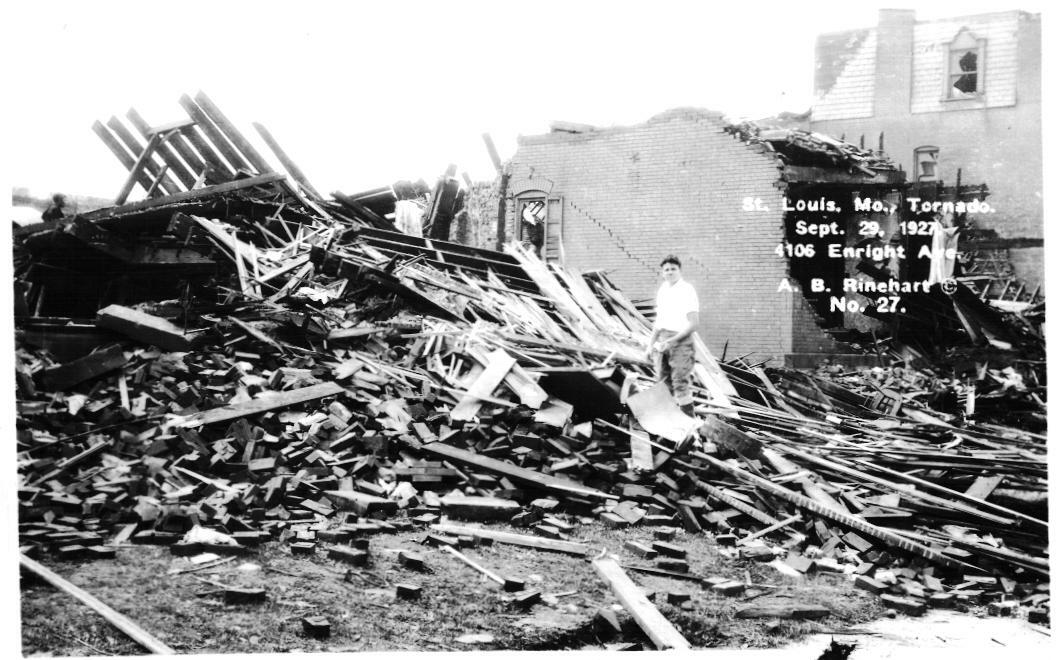
- Damage from an F3 tornado along Enright Avenue in St. Louis

Meteorological history
- Formed: September 29, 1927

Tornado outbreak
- Tornadoes: 15 confirmed
- Max. rating: F3 tornado

Overall effects
- Casualties: ≥ 82 fatalities, ≥ 620 injuries
- Damage: ≥ $22,000,000 (1927 USD) (Note: All losses are in 1927 USD unless otherwise noted.) ≥ $408 million (2025 USD)
- Areas affected: Midwestern and Southern United States
- Part of the tornadoes and tornado outbreaks of 1927

On Thursday, September 29, 1927, an outbreak of at least 15 significant tornadoes, including three F3 tornadoes, killed at least 82 people in the Central United States, particularly in Missouri and Illinois. The outbreak affected a broad expanse of the Midwestern and Southern United States, including Oklahoma, Missouri, Arkansas, Iowa, Illinois, and Indiana. The deadliest tornado was an estimated F3 which affected portions of Greater St. Louis, killing at least 79 people and injuring at least 550 others. The tornado narrowly missed Downtown St. Louis, striking north of the central business district before crossing the Mississippi River. (Note: An outbreak is generally defined as a group of at least six tornadoes (the number sometimes varies slightly according to local climatology) with no more than a six-hour gap between individual tornadoes. An outbreak sequence, prior to (after) the start of modern records in 1950, is defined as a period of no more than two (one) consecutive days without at least one significant (F2 or stronger) tornado.) (Note: The Fujita scale was devised under the aegis of scientist T. Theodore Fujita in the early 1970s. Prior to the advent of the scale in 1971, tornadoes in the United States were officially unrated. While the Fujita scale has been superseded by the Enhanced Fujita scale in the U.S. since February 1, 2007, Canada used the old scale until April 1, 2013; nations elsewhere, like the United Kingdom, apply other classifications such as the TORRO scale.) (Note: Historically, the number of tornadoes globally and in the United States was and is likely underrepresented: research by Grazulis on annual tornado activity suggests that, as of 2001, only 53% of yearly U.S. tornadoes were officially recorded. Documentation of tornadoes outside the United States was historically less exhaustive, owing to the lack of monitors in many nations and, in some cases, to internal political controls on public information. Most countries only recorded tornadoes that produced severe damage or loss of life. Significant low biases in U.S. tornado counts likely occurred through the early 1990s, when advanced NEXRAD was first installed and the National Weather Service began comprehensively verifying tornado occurrences.)

== Confirmed tornadoes ==
Confirmed tornadoes by Fujita rating
FU	F0	F1	F2	F3	F4	F5	Total
4	?	?	8	3	0	0	≥ 15

=== September 29 event ===
Confirmed tornadoes – Thursday, September 29, 1927 (Note: All dates are based on the local time zone where the tornado touched down; however, all times are in Coordinated Universal Time and dates are split at midnight CST/CDT for consistency.) (Note: Prior to 1994, only the average widths of tornado paths were officially listed.)
F#	Location	County / Parish	State	Time (UTC)	Path length	Max. width	Summary
F2	NW of Checotah	McIntosh	OK	13:00–?	1 mile (1.6 km)	400 yd (370 m)	"Small" tornado affected a couple of farmsteads, destroying several barns and farmhouses. Eight people were injured and losses totaled $23,000.
F2	Rudy to SE of Mountainburg	Crawford	AR	15:29–?	7 miles (11 km)	100 yd (91 m)	Tornado damaged or destroyed 30 homes and a school, the latter of which partly collapsed, injuring five students out of 106. Cultivated and forested lands were heavily damaged. 20 people were injured and losses totaled $75,000.
F2	SE of Audubon	Audubon	IA	18:00–?	6 miles (9.7 km)	100 yd (91 m)	Tornado affected five farmsteads, destroying several barns. Losses totaled $4,000.
F2	Brookfield	Linn	MO	18:15–?	Unknown	Unknown	Tornado destroyed a barn. Losses totaled $400.
F3	Southern Webster Groves, MO to N of Downtown St. Louis, MO to Granite City, IL	St. Louis (MO), Madison (IL)	MO, IL	18:50–?	12 miles (19 km)	600 yd (550 m)	79 deaths – See section on this tornado – 550 people were injured and losses totaled $53 million.
FU	Menlo	Guthrie	IA	19:30–?	2 miles (3.2 km)	Unknown	Tornado downed structures, utility wires, and trees. Losses totaled $5,000.
F3	French to S of Mammoth Spring	Fulton	AR	20:00–?	15 miles (24 km)	150 yd (140 m)	1 death – Tornado wrecked the village of French, destroying or damaging every structure, including two stores and three homes. An eight-room home was shorn of all but a single floorboard. 25 people were injured and losses totaled $15,000.
F2	S of Morrisonville	Christian	IL	20:00–?	1 mile (1.6 km)	100 yd (91 m)	Tornado unroofed a home and destroyed a large barn nearby.
FU	Doniphan	Ripley	MO	21:00–?	10 miles (16 km)	Unknown	"Tornado-like" circulation, up to 1 mi (1.6 km; 1,600 m; 1,800 yd) wide, produced intermittent damage to crops, windows, and homes. Some homes were reportedly unroofed. Losses totaled $1,300.
F3	Northeastern Cowden	Shelby	IL	21:00–?	12 miles (19 km)	200 yd (180 m)	2 deaths – Tornado destroyed a brick home, killing a couple inside. Three people were injured and losses totaled $10,000.
F2	W of Corning, AR to Broseley, MO	Clay (AR), Butler (MO)	AR, MO	22:00–?	30 miles (48 km)	400 yd (370 m)	Tornado destroyed or damaged 16 homes in Missouri, injuring 11 people in the state.
F2	NE of Chrisman, IL to IN	Edgar (IL), Vermillion (IN)	IL, IN	23:00–?	12 miles (19 km)	100 yd (91 m)	Tornado destroyed or damaged several barns. Three people were injured and losses totaled $15,000.
FU	Conlogue	Edgar	IL	02:30–?	Unknown	Unknown	Tornado reported.
F2	Northern Lurton	Newton	AR	04:00–?	1 mile (1.6 km)	Unknown	Pair of tornadoes reportedly destroyed timberland, a home, and a school.
FU	Cates	Fountain	IN	Unknown	Unknown	Unknown	Tornado formed from the same storm as the Chrisman F2. Losses totaled $65,000.

=== St. Louis, Missouri/East St. Louis, Illinois ===
St. Louis, Missouri/East St. Louis, Illinois
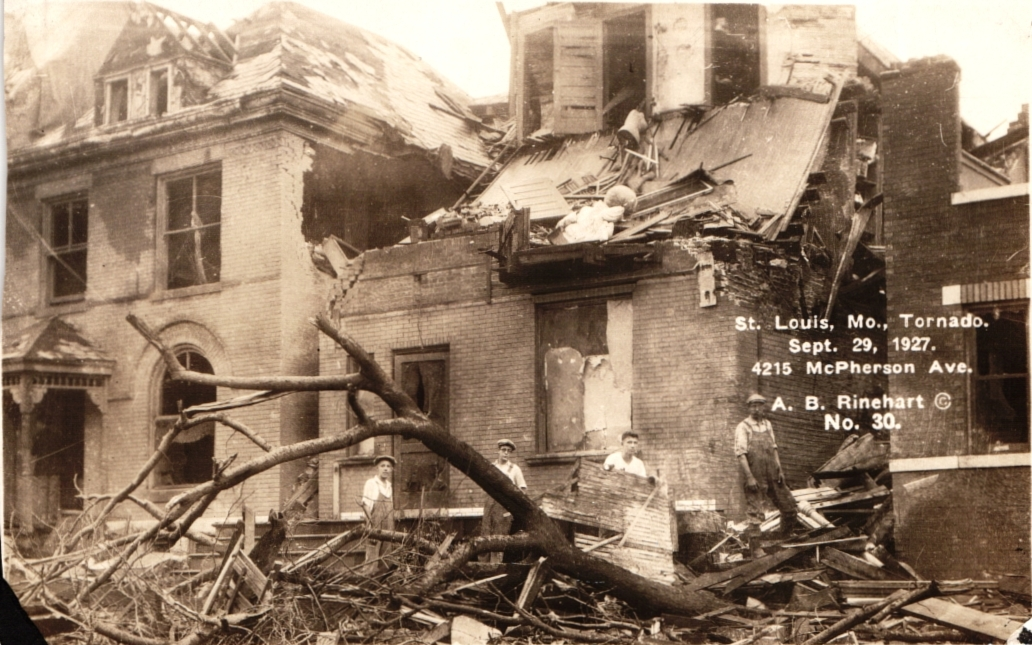
- Damage on McPherson Avenue in St. Louis

Meteorological history
- Formed: September 29, 1927; 12:50 p.m. CST; St. Louis County, Missouri

F3 tornado
- on the Fujita scale

Overall effects
- Fatalities: 72–79+
- Injuries: 550+
- Damage: $22 million (1927 USD) $408 million (2025 USD)
- Areas affected: Greater St. Louis

The 1927 St. Louis–East St. Louis tornado was a powerful and devastating tornado that struck St. Louis, Missouri, on Thursday, September 29, 1927, at about 1:00 p.m. local standard time. The tornado is estimated to have reached at least F3 and possible F4 intensity on the Fujita scale. The 2nd deadliest tornado to occur in the St. Louis metropolitan area, it caused 79 deaths—though totals vary from 72 to 84—and injured more than 550 people within a 7-to-12-mile-long (11 to 19 km), 100-to-600-yard-wide (91 to 549 m) path. At one time it was the second-costliest tornado in U.S. history. More than 200 city blocks were destroyed.

St. Louis University High School was hit hard. The student chapel's roof collapsed, the gym's (now main offices') roof was damaged, an entire classroom caved in on a class, and other classrooms were damaged. All the windows were smashed. Luckily, no one was killed or badly injured. The tornado caused $150,000 in damage to the school.

== See also ==
- List of tornadoes and tornado outbreaks
  - List of North American tornadoes and tornado outbreaks
- List of tornadoes striking downtown areas of large cities
- 1871 St. Louis tornado
- 1896 St. Louis–East St. Louis tornado
- St. Louis tornado outbreak of February 1959
- St. Louis tornado history

== Sources ==
- Brooks, Harold E. (April 2004). "On the Relationship of Tornado Path Length and Width to Intensity". Weather and Forecasting. 19 (2). Boston: American Meteorological Society: 310–19. Bibcode:2004WtFor..19..310B. doi:10.1175/1520-0434(2004)019<0310:OTROTP>2.0.CO;2.
- Brooks, Harold E.; Doswell III, Charles A. (February 2001). "Normalized Damage from Major Tornadoes in the United States: 1890–1999". Weather and Forecasting. 16 (1). American Meteorological Society: 168–76. Bibcode:2001WtFor..16..168B. doi:10.1175/1520-0434(2001)016<0168:NDFMTI>2.0.CO;2.
- Cook, A. R.; Schaefer, J. T. (August 2008). "The Relation of El Niño–Southern Oscillation (ENSO) to Winter Tornado Outbreaks". Monthly Weather Review. 136 (8). Boston: American Meteorological Society: 3135. Bibcode:2008MWRv..136.3121C. doi:10.1175/2007MWR2171.1.
- Grazulis, Thomas P. (July 1993). Significant Tornadoes 1680–1991: A Chronology and Analysis of Events. St. Johnsbury, Vermont: The Tornado Project of Environmental Films. ISBN 1-879362-03-1.
- Grazulis, Thomas P. (2001a). The Tornado: Nature's Ultimate Windstorm. Norman: University of Oklahoma Press. ISBN 978-0-8061-3538-0.
- Grazulis, Thomas P. (2001b). F5-F6 Tornadoes. St. Johnsbury, Vermont: The Tornado Project of Environmental Films.
- U.S. Weather Bureau (September 1927). "Severe local storms, September 1927". Monthly Weather Review. 55 (9). Boston: American Meteorological Society: 424. Bibcode:1927MWRv...55..424.. doi:10.1175/1520-0493(1927)55<424:SLSS>2.0.CO;2.
- Reeder, George (September 1927). "Special Storm Notes". Special Weather Summary. Climatological Data. Missouri. 31 (9). Asheville, North Carolina: National Climatic Data Center: 40.

Preceded by Tri-State (MO, IL, & IN) (1925)	Costliest U.S. tornadoes on Record; September 29, 1927	Succeeded by Waco, TX (1953)
