= List of United States tornadoes from January to February 1990 =

This is a list of all tornadoes that were confirmed by local offices of the National Weather Service in the United States from January to February 1990.

== January ==
Confirmed tornadoes by Fujita rating
FU	F0	F1	F2	F3	F4	F5	Total
0	7	1	2	1	0	0	11

=== January 14 event ===
List of confirmed tornadoes – Sunday, January 14, 1990 (Note: All dates are based on the local time zone where the tornado touched down; however, all times are in Coordinated Universal Time for consistency.)
F#	Location	County / Parish	State	Start Coord.	Time (UTC)	Path length	Max width	
F#	F0	San Diego	San Diego	CA	Unknown	11:30	0.1 mi (0.16 km)	10 yd (9.1 m)
This tornado is officially classified in Storm Data as a waterspout by the National Oceanic and Atmospheric Administration and National Centers for Environmental Information. It is noted that the waterspout damaged several docked and anchored boats, before coming onshore and throwing large wooden planks into cars in a parking lot. The official report does not document a rating on the Fujita scale, due to the tornado being classified a waterspout and not a tornado. However, according to the National Centers for Environmental Information's Storm Event Database, which was updated with this tornado in 2014, a brief F0 tornado caused $250,000 (1990 USD) in damage.	F0							

=== January 19 event ===
List of confirmed tornadoes – Friday, January 19, 1990
F#	Location	County / Parish	State	Start Coord.	Time (UTC)	Path length	Max width	
F#	F2	Garland	Dallas	TX	Unknown	17:30	0.80 mi (1.29 km)	50 yd (46 m)
Numerous houses were damaged, with 18 sustaining severe damage and six being declared "uninhabitable" following the tornado. Several houses had their roofs completely removed and exterior walls severely damaged or mostly demolished. One person was injured.	F2							
F3	Apple Springs to W of Lufkin	Trinity, Angelina	TX	Unknown	21:40	13 mi (21 km)	100 yd (91 m)	
F3	This strong tornado first struck Apple Springs, damaging around 20 homes, overturning a mobile home and shifting it around 70 feet, and snapping several power poles. The tornado then moved northeast into Angelina County while intensifying and reaching F3 strength near Hudson. 41 permanent houses and three mobile homes were damaged in Hudson, with nine houses being severely damaged. Numerous trees were snapped or uprooted along the path. Several fences and a satellite dish were blown over as well.							
F0	W of Brokeland	San Augustine County, Texas	TX	Unknown	00:10	0.20 mi (0.32 km)	10 yd (9.1 m)	
F0	Tornadic waterspout was observed over Lake Sam Rayburn Reservoir.							

=== January 24 event ===
List of confirmed tornadoes - Wednesday, January 24, 1990
F#	Location	County	State	Time (UTC)	Path length	Max. width	Summary	Refs
F0	NE of Mowata	Acadia	LA	1700	0.20 miles (0.32 km)	27 yards (25 m)	Minor damage was observed to the roof of a school.	

=== January 25 event ===
List of confirmed tornadoes - Thursday, January 25, 1990
F#	Location	County	State	Time (UTC)	Path length	Max. width	Summary	Refs
F1	W of Patsburg to NNE of Petrey	Crenshaw	AL	1150	8 miles (13 km)	73 yards (67 m)	Four houses sustained moderate damage, and eight chicken houses and three outbuildings were destroyed. 28 people were injured, with three being critically injured.	
F0	NNW of Albany	Lee	GA	1715	0.50 miles (0.80 km)	33 yards (30 m)	A mobile home was pushed off of its foundation, while a church and several houses sustained roof and window damage. Damage was intermittent and mostly limited to trees.	

=== January 29 event ===
List of confirmed tornadoes - Monday, January 29, 1990
F#	Location	County	State	Time (UTC)	Path length	Max. width	Summary	Refs
F2	NNE of Blythe to NW of Hephzibah	Richmond	GA	2043	0.90 miles (1.45 km)	100 yards (91 m)	Three mobile homes were completely destroyed with debris scattered for hundreds of yards, while a two-story brick house was severely damaged. Four additional mobile homes in another park roughly one mile to the north sustained minor damage. Additionally, seven trailers were torn off of their foundations, and roughly 50 trees were snapped or uprooted.	
F0	ESE of Henrico	Northampton	NC	0050	0.70 miles (1.13 km)	100 yards (91 m)	A narrow rope tornado pushed two mobile homes off of their foundations and snapped the upper branches of several trees.	

=== January 30 event ===
List of confirmed tornadoes - Tuesday, January 30, 1990
F#	Location	County	State	Time (UTC)	Path length	Max. width	Summary	Refs
F0	N of Callville Bay	Clark	NV	0020	0.20 miles (0.32 km)	10 yards (9.1 m)	Two pilots reported a tornado touchdown.	
