= Riverview, St. Louis =

Neighborhood of St. Louis in Missouri, US

Coordinates: 38.7468°N 90.1975°W

Riverview
- Neighborhood of St. Louis
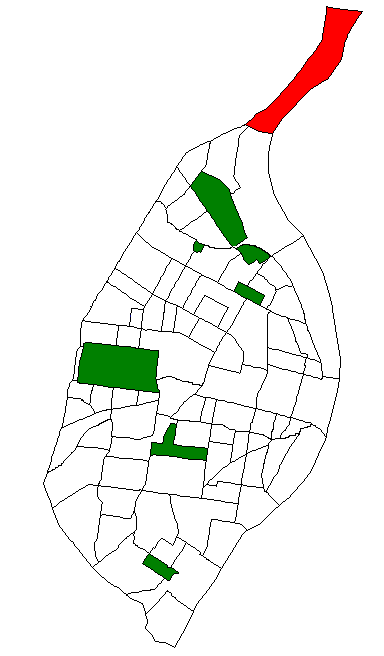
- Location (red) of Riverview within St. Louis
- Country: United States
- State: Missouri
- City: St. Louis
- Wards: 13

Government
  - Aldermen: Pam Boyd

Area
  - Total: 1.34 sq mi (3.5 km^{2})

Population (2020)
  - Total: 242
  - Density: 181/sq mi (69.7/km^{2})
- ZIP code(s): Part of 63137
- Area code(s): 314
- Website: stlouis-mo.gov

Riverview is a neighborhood of St. Louis, Missouri. Riverview comprises the extreme northern section of the city, bounded by the Mississippi River to the east, the city limits to the west, and Chain of Rocks Road to the south, with the northern boundary lying a third of a mile north of I-270. The only major road running through the neighborhood is Riverview Drive.

== Demographics ==
Historical population
Census	Pop.	Note	%±
1990	329		—
2000	237		−28.0%
2010	304		28.3%
2020	242		−20.4%

In 2020 Riverview's racial makeup was 69.8% Black, 28.1% White, and 1.7% two or more races. Hispanic or Latino residents of any race accounted for 0.4% of the population.

== See also ==
- Riverview, St. Louis County, Missouri, a village in adjoining St. Louis County
