= Riverview, St. Louis County, Missouri =

Riverview, Missouri
- City
- Location of Riverview, Missouri
- Coordinates: 38°45′02″N 90°12′41″W
- Country: United States
- State: Missouri
- County: St. Louis

Area
  - Total: 0.83 sq mi (2.15 km^{2})
  - Land: 0.83 sq mi (2.15 km^{2})
  - Water: 0 sq mi (0.00 km^{2})
- Elevation: 528 ft (161 m)

Population (2020)
  - Total: 2,397
  - Density: 2,887.7/sq mi (1,114.95/km^{2})
- Time zone: UTC-6 (Central (CST))
  - Summer (DST): UTC-5 (CDT)
- FIPS code: 29-62192
- GNIS feature ID: 2399093

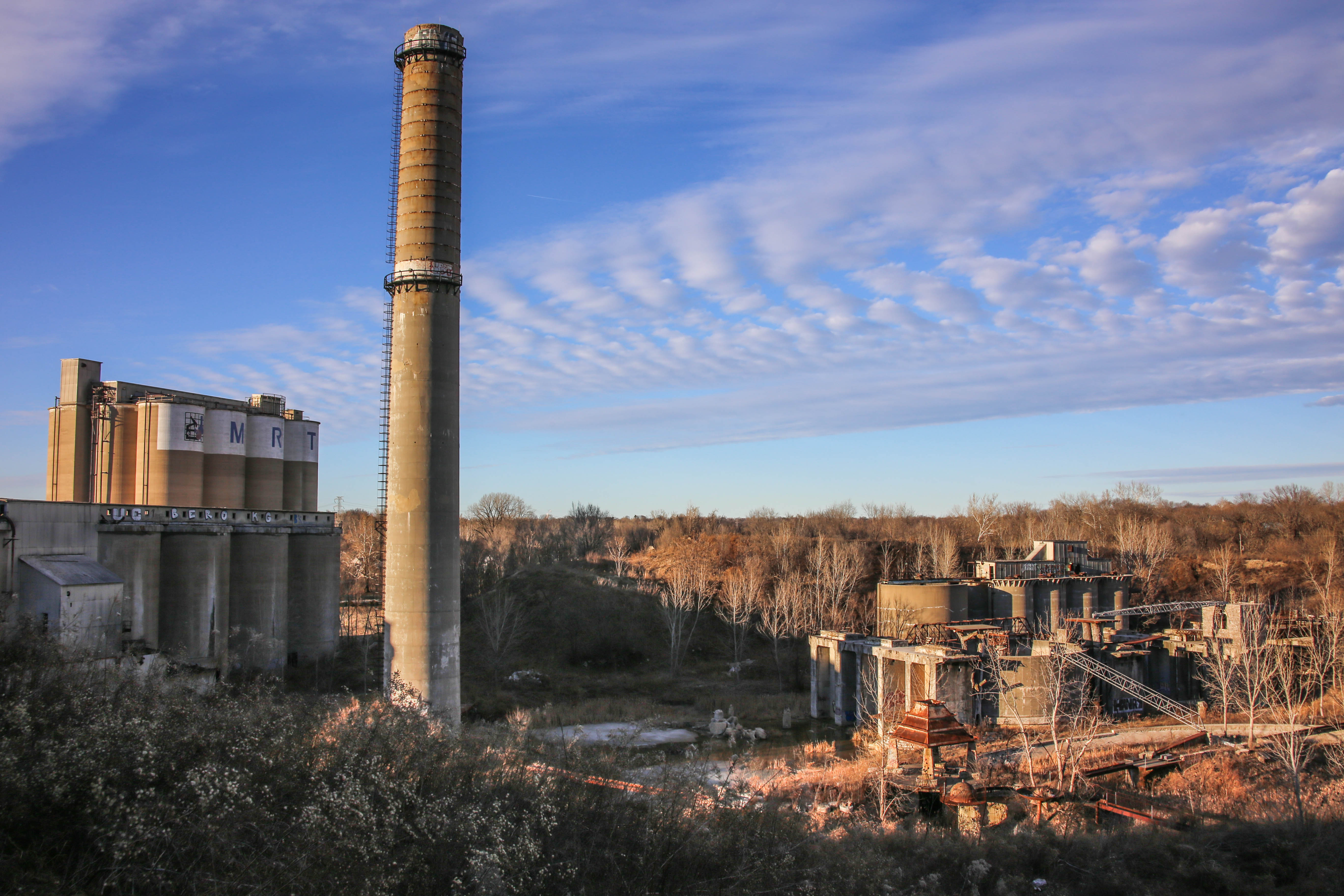
cementland: bob cassilly

Riverview is a city in St. Louis County, Missouri, United States. The population was 2,397 at the 2020 census.

== Geography ==
According to the United States Census Bureau, the city has a total area of 0.83 square miles (2.15 km^{2}), all land.

== Demographics ==
Historical population
Census	Pop.	Note	%±
1960	3,706		—
1970	3,741		0.9%
1980	3,367		−10.0%
1990	3,242		−3.7%
2000	3,146		−3.0%
2010	2,856		−9.2%
2020	2,397		−16.1%
U.S. Decennial Census

=== 2020 census ===
Riverview village, Missouri – Racial and ethnic composition Note: the US Census treats Hispanic/Latino as an ethnic category. This table excludes Latinos from the racial categories and assigns them to a separate category. Hispanics/Latinos may be of any race.
Race / Ethnicity (NH = Non-Hispanic)	Pop 2000	Pop 2010	Pop 2020	% 2000	% 2010	% 2020
White alone (NH)	1,792	769	417	56.96%	26.93%	17.40%
Black or African American alone (NH)	1,242	1,991	1,821	39.48%	69.71%	75.97%
Native American or Alaska Native alone (NH)	12	4	11	0.38%	0.14%	0.46%
Asian alone (NH)	5	9	9	0.16%	0.32%	0.38%
Native Hawaiian or Pacific Islander alone (NH)	0	0	3	0.00%	0.00%	0.13%
Other race alone (NH)	2	2	13	0.06%	0.07%	0.54%
Mixed race or Multiracial (NH)	42	61	89	1.34%	2.14%	3.71%
Hispanic or Latino (any race)	51	20	34	1.62%	0.70%	1.42%
Total	3,146	2,856	2,397	100.00%	100.00%	100.00%

=== 2010 census ===
As of the census of 2010, there were 2,856 people, 1,125 households, and 700 families residing in the city. The population density was 3,441.0 inhabitants per square mile (1,328.6/km^{2}). There were 1,368 housing units at an average density of 1,648.2 per square mile (636.4/km^{2}). The racial makeup of the city was 27.0% White, 69.9% African American, 0.2% Native American, 0.3% Asian, 0.4% from other races, and 2.2% from two or more races. Hispanic or Latino of any race were 0.7% of the population.

There were 1,125 households, of which 36.6% had children under the age of 18 living with them, 25.2% were married couples living together, 29.7% had a female householder with no husband present, 7.3% had a male householder with no wife present, and 37.8% were non-families. 31.9% of all households were made up of individuals, and 6.4% had someone living alone who was 65 years of age or older. The average household size was 2.54 and the average family size was 3.21.

The median age in the city was 31.6 years. 29.1% of residents were under the age of 18; 11.1% were between the ages of 18 and 24; 26.5% were from 25 to 44; 25.1% were from 45 to 64; and 8.2% were 65 years of age or older. The gender makeup of the city was 47.6% male and 52.4% female.

=== 2000 census ===
In 2000 there were 1,331 households, out of which 31.6% had children under the age of 18 living with them, 32.9% were married couples living together, 21.1% had a female householder with no husband present, and 40.7% were non-families. 34.5% of all households were made up of individuals, and 9.7% had someone living alone who was 65 years of age or older. The average household size was 2.35 and the average family size was 3.03.

In the city, the population was spread out, with 27.7% under the age of 18, 9.8% from 18 to 24, 32.4% from 25 to 44, 17.7% from 45 to 64, and 12.4% who were 65 years of age or older. The median age was 33 years. For every 100 females, there were 91.8 males. For every 100 females age 18 and over, there were 83.5 males.

The median income for a household in the city was $30,970, and the median income for a family was $36,538. Males had a median income of $32,470 versus $21,699 for females. The per capita income for the city was $15,237. 17.2% of the population and 14.9% of families were below the poverty line. Out of the total people living in poverty, 27.3% are under the age of 18 and 5.8% are 65 or older.

== See also ==
- Riverview, St. Louis, a neighborhood in adjoining City of St. Louis
