= 1896 St. Louis–East St. Louis tornado =

Extraordinarily destructive windstorm in Missouri and Illinois, United States

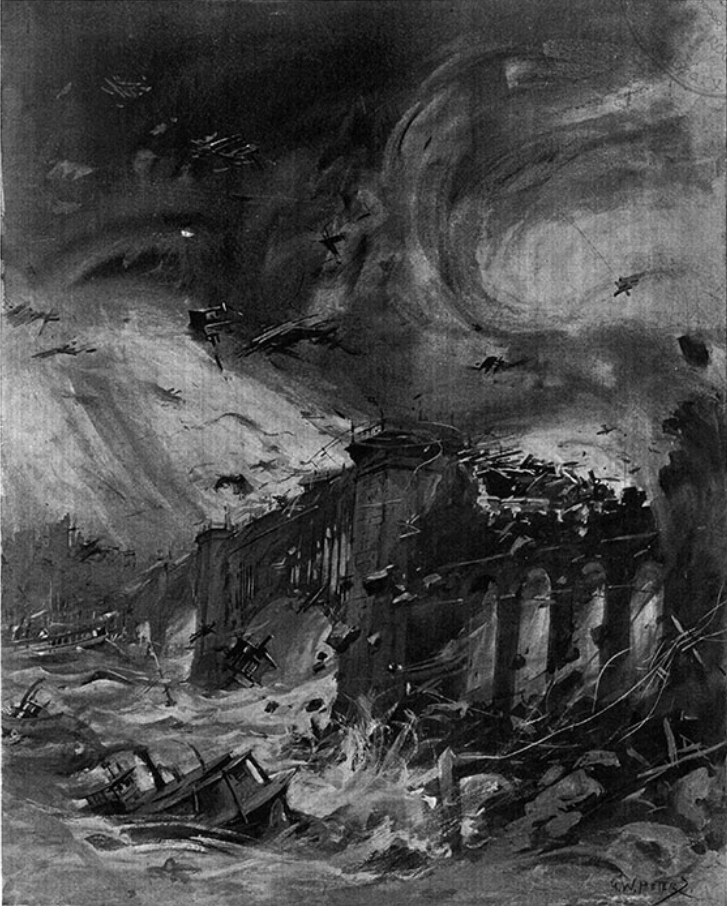
- Harper's Weekly sketch, showing a depiction of the tornado over St. Louis

Meteorological history
- Duration: May 27–28, 1896

F4 equiv. tornado
- Highest winds: 418 km/h (260 mph)

Overall effects
- Fatalities: 255+
- Injuries: 1,000+
- Damage: $12 million (1896 USD) $4.64 billion (2025 USD) >$5.92 billion when adjusting for wealth (2026 USD).
- Part of the Tornado outbreak sequence of May 1896

On May 27, 1896, a tornado caused severe damage to downtown St. Louis, Missouri, East St. Louis, Illinois, and surrounding areas. One of the deadliest and most destructive tornadoes in U.S. history, this tornado was the most notable of a major tornado outbreak sequence across the central United States which produced several other large, long-track, violent tornadoes and continued across the eastern United States the following day. The St. Louis tornado killed at least 255 people, injured over a thousand others, and caused more than $10 million in damage (equivalent to $387 million in 2025) in about 20 minutes. More than 5,000 people were left homeless and lost all of their possessions. The hardest-hit areas of the city were the fashionable Lafayette Square and Compton Heights neighborhoods, as well as the poorer Mill Creek Valley. It remains the third-deadliest tornado in United States history.

== May 27, 1896 tornado outbreak ==
Confirmed tornadoes by Fujita rating
FU	F0	F1	F2	F3	F4	F5	Total
?	?	?	5	5	4	0	14

While a storm had been predicted for the latter days in May, many disregarded the warning or believed the city of St. Louis would not be affected. Weather forecasters at the time lacked technology sufficient to predict tornadoes (then commonly called "cyclones") of this magnitude, but they could anticipate strong storm systems. The day started quietly, with people going about their daily business; the weather in the morning did not indicate any severe weather event. The local Weather Bureau predicted thunderstorms but nothing more serious. Around noon, the clouds began to appear more ominous and the barometric pressure dropped, alarming those who knew this was an indication of a tornado.

=== Meteorological synopsis ===
On the afternoon of May 27, 1896, the skies darkened. The Weather Bureau Observatory was not overly concerned but residents were uneasy. The first significant tornado of the day, an F2, formed near Bellflower, Missouri and killed one woman. Three students were killed and 16 were injured when the Dye School in Audrain County was struck by an F3 around 6:15 p.m. The same tornado killed one student and injured 19 others at the Bean Creek school a few minutes later. At 6:30 p.m., two supercell thunderstorms produced two additional tornadoes. One, an F4, decimated farms in New Minden, Hoyleton, Richview, and Irvington, Illinois. Twenty-seven more people died in the other Illinois tornadoes (another F4 and an F3) of this outbreak.

== Tornado summary ==
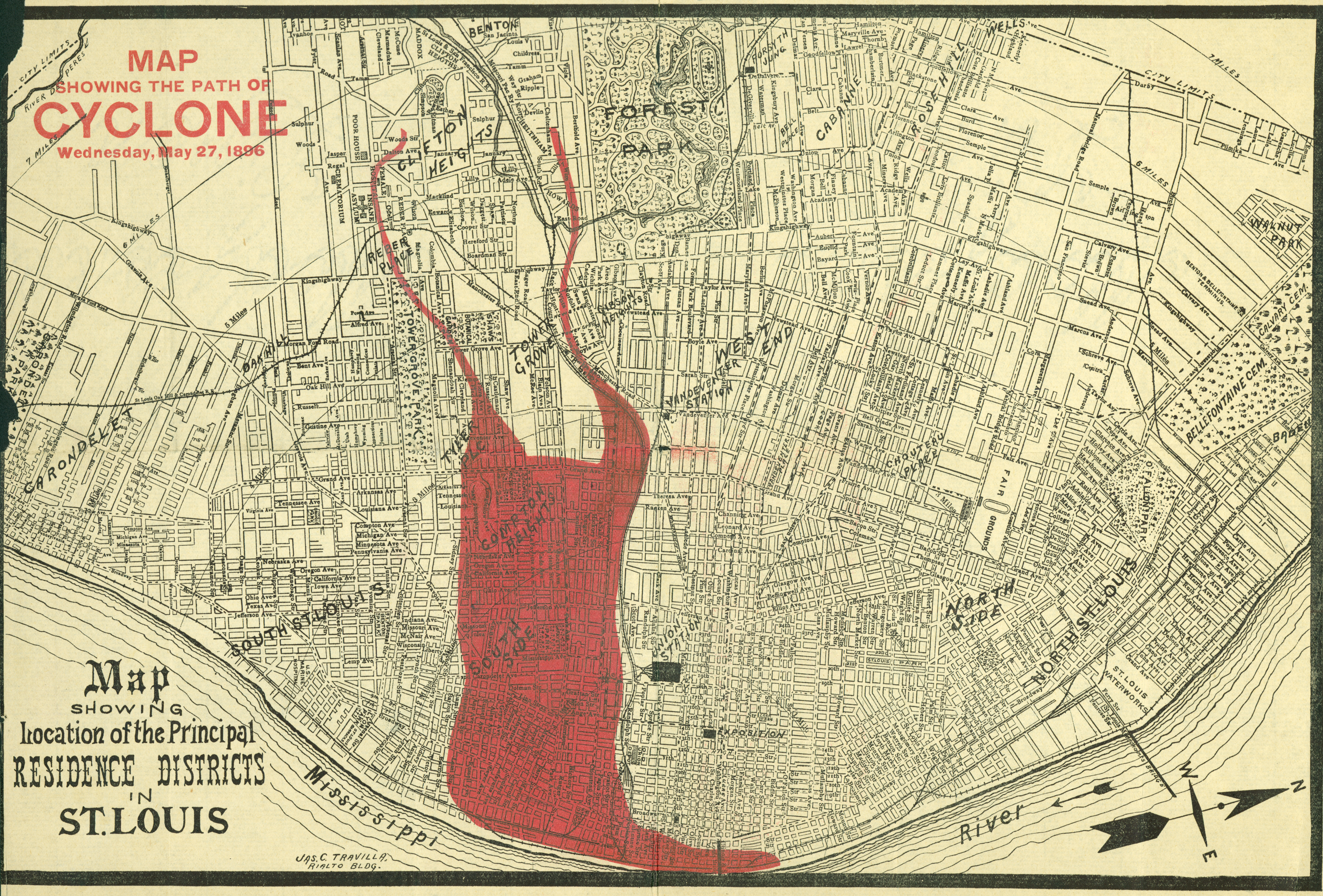
Path of destruction in the City of St. Louis

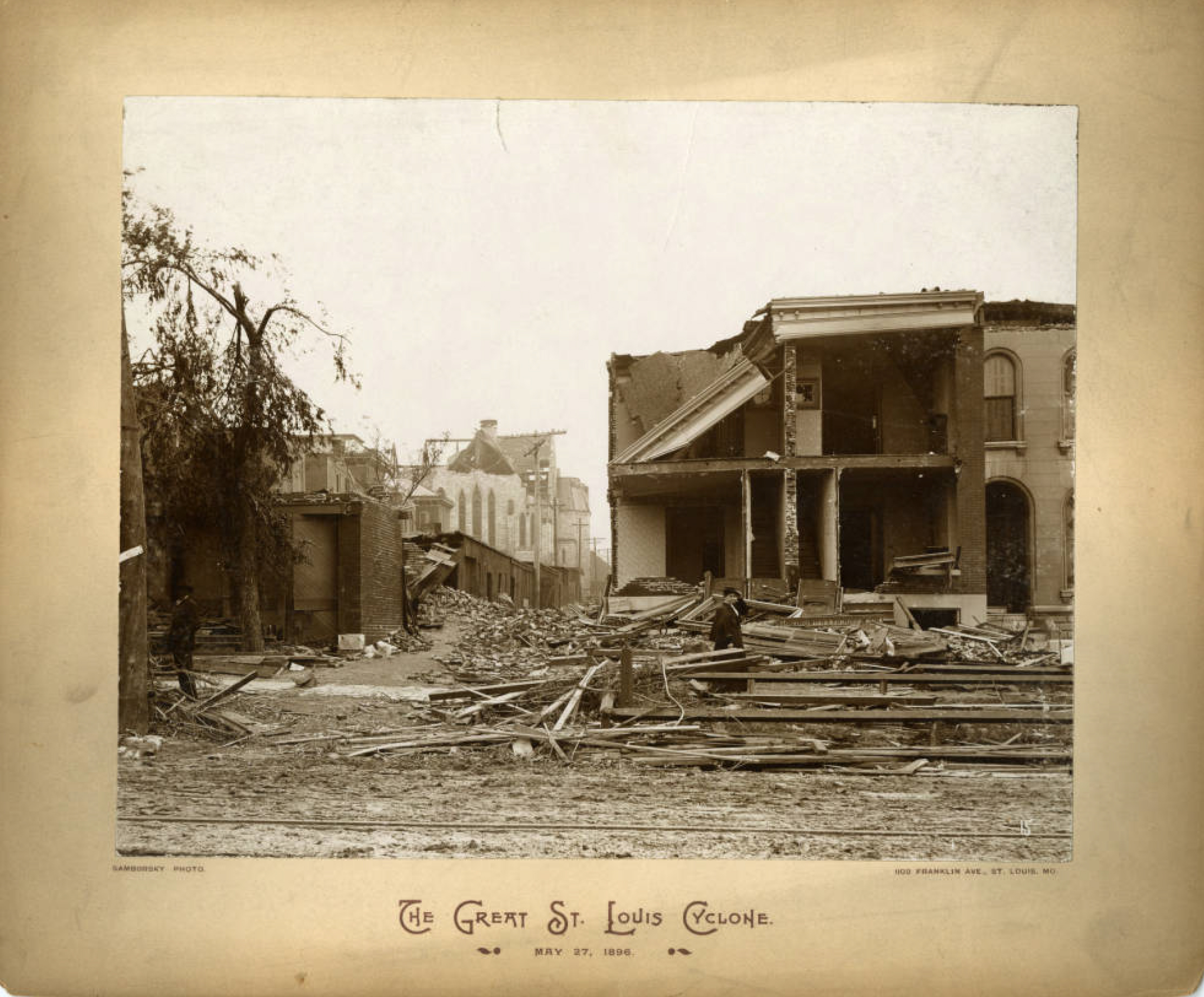
Park Avenue residence with woman walking by. A "for sale" sign can be seen lying next to an almost completely demolished building. A row of shacks in front of the church is left untouched. (State Historical Society of Missouri)

The tornado spawned from the other supercell touched down in St. Louis, Missouri, then one of the largest and most influential cities in the country. It was one of at least 18 tornadoes to occur on that day, and it quickly became the third-deadliest as well as the then-costliest tornado in United States history. At least 137 people died as the tornado traversed the core of the downtown area, leaving a continuous, 1-mile-wide (1.6 km) swath of destroyed homes, schools, saloons, factories, mills, churches, parks, and railroad yards in its wake. A few of the destroyed homes were all but completely swept away. Numerous trees were downed at the 36-acre (0.15 km^{2}) Lafayette Park, and a barometer recorded a drop to 26.74 inHg (906 hPa) at this location.

The tornado crossed the Mississippi River and struck the Eads Bridge, where a 2 in × 10 in (51 mm × 254 mm) wooden plank was found driven through a 5/16 in (7.9 mm) wrought iron plate. Uncounted others may have died on boats on the river, which would have swept their bodies downriver where they could not be recorded in the official death toll. The tornado continued into East St. Louis, Illinois, where it was smaller but more intense, nearly reaching F5 intensity. Homes and buildings along the river were completely swept away and a quarter of the buildings there were damaged or destroyed. An additional 118 people were killed, 35 of whom were at the Vandalia railroad freight yards. By the end of the day, the confirmed death toll was 255, with some estimates above 400; more than 1,000 were injured. The tornado was later rated F4 on the Fujita scale.

Following the cyclone's destruction, members of Light Battery "A" and the First Regiment were placed on volunteer duty. Within an hour of the tornado striking, 32 members were on duty with ambulances and hospital corps to assist in rescue operations and to help victims. The mayor asked that both commands remain on patrol duty on May 30. Members of the bicycle corps of Company "G" First Regiment assisted when railway service was inaccessible. Telephone and telegraph wires were destroyed and streets were impassable. Officers were summoned to duty by bicycle couriers, as this was the only means of communication. Enough damage was done to the city that there was some speculation that St. Louis might not be able to host the 1896 Republican National Convention in June, just three weeks later, but after a massive clean-up effort, the convention went ahead as planned.

== Long-term impact ==
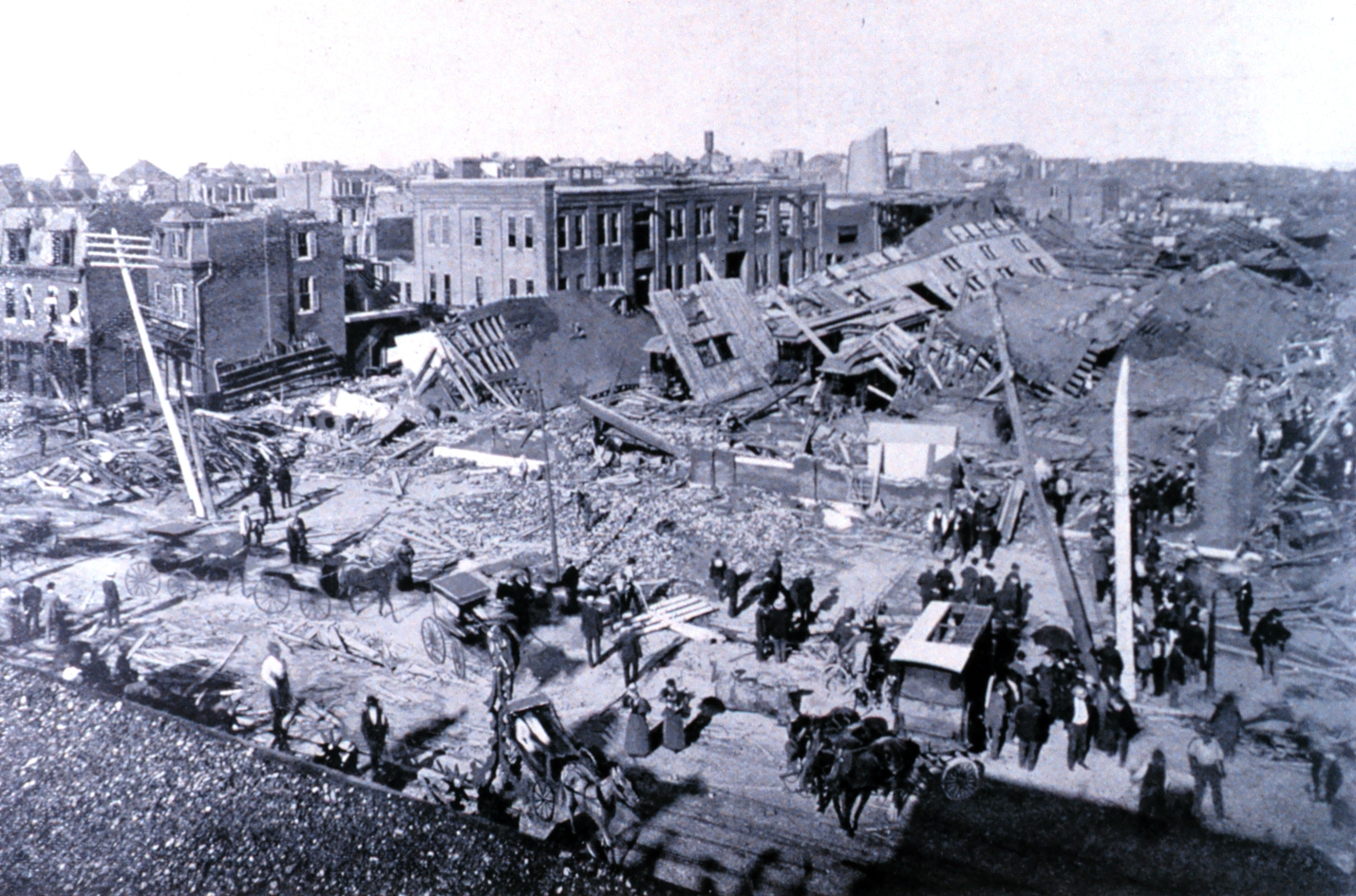
Tornado damage, Union Depot, Jefferson and Allen Avenues, St. Louis, National Oceanic and Atmospheric Administration photograph by J. C. Strauss, May 27, 1896

The tornado was the most devastating known in the United States up to that time. Approximately 12,000 buildings were seriously damaged, valued in excess of $10 million. Today, this would be equivalent to almost 5.3 billion dollars' worth of damage, making it potentially the costliest tornado on record. In the wake of highly sensationalized local, national, and international news coverage of the St. Louis tornado, over 140,000 sightseers flocked to inspect the damaged areas. The cyclone permanently altered the course of residential, commercial, and industrial development in the most heavily damaged areas of the city.

Political reverberations came in the 1897 city elections, when middle-class reform candidates were decisively defeated by a coalition supported largely by the German vote in heavily impacted neighborhoods.

== In perspective ==
=== St. Louis tornado history ===
It is rare for the core of a large city to be hit directly by a tornado, especially a large and intense tornado, due to a city's relatively small area and the lack of large cities in the highest tornado threat region. Nevertheless, a number of deadly and destructive tornadoes have tracked through the City of St. Louis during its history. In addition to the 1896 tornado, St. Louis was struck by tornadoes in 1871 (9 killed); 1890 (4 killed); 1904 (3 killed, 100 injured); 1927 (72+ killed, 550+ injured); 1959 (21 killed, 345 injured), and 2025 (5 killed), among others. St. Louis is the most tornado-afflicted urban area in the U.S. The Greater St. Louis area is the scene of even more historically destructive and deadly tornadoes. Oklahoma City is the metropolitan area with the most frequent significant tornadoes.

=== 1896 tornado season ===
In an intense tornado outbreak sequence, other major storms occurred on May 15, May 17, and May 24–25, with smaller outbreaks throughout the month. Despite sparse records, history records unusual tornado activity between mid-May until the end of the month. Tom Grazulis has stated that the week of May 24–28 was "perhaps the most violent single week of tornado activity in US history."

The 1896 tornado season has the distinction of being one of the deadliest in United States history. There were at least 40 killer tornadoes between April 11 and November 26. This tornado was the only one to kill more than 100 people in two separate cities.

== See also ==
- 1953 Waco tornado—An F5 tornado that struck the city of Waco, Texas on May 11
- List of North American tornadoes and tornado outbreaks
- List of tornadoes striking downtown areas of large cities

Preceded by Louisville, KY (1890)	Costliest U.S. tornadoes on Record; May 27, 1896	Succeeded by Lorain–Sandusky, OH (1924)
