= St. Louis tornado outbreak of February 1959 =

Weather event in the United States

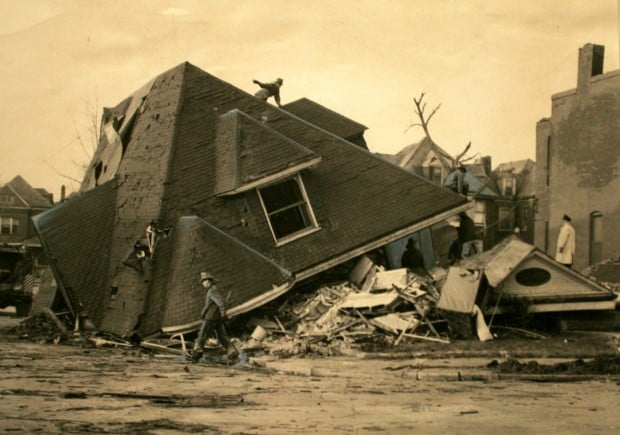
- The remains of a three-story home that was destroyed by the F4 tornado in St. Louis.

Meteorological history
- Duration: 1 day, 2 hours, and 5 minutes

Tornado outbreak
- Tornadoes: 17
- Max. rating: F4 tornado
- Largest hail: 1.75 in (4.4 cm)

Overall effects
- Casualties: 21 fatalities (+2 non-tornadic), 358 injuries (+197 non-tornadic)
- Damage: $53.713 million (1959 USD)
- Areas affected: Great Plains, Midwest, Southeast
- Part of the tornado outbreaks of 1959

A massive storm system spawned a destructive and deadly outbreak of 17 tornadoes on February 9–10, 1959, mostly during the overnight hours, causing widespread destruction in the Midwest and Southeast regions of the United States. The worst activity occurred from the early- to mid-morning as several strong tornadoes impacted areas from Missouri to Ohio. The first of these tornadoes was a violent F4 tornado which tore through the northwestern part of St. Louis with no warning, damaging or destroying over 2000 buildings and killing 21 people. F3 tornadoes later that morning also caused heavy damage in or near Bruceville, Indiana, Sanders, Kentucky, and Sugar Tree Ridge, Ohio; the latter tornado also hit a school that was in session in Belfast. Overall, the tornadoes caused 21 fatalities (all in St. Louis), 358 injuries, and $53.713 million in damage. (Note: All losses are in 1959 USD unless otherwise noted.)

The storm system that spawned the tornadoes was also responsible for triggering a massive wind and dust storm across the southern Great Plains along with snow, sleet, and freezing rain from Kansas northeastward into Michigan. Heavy rainfall over ice and frozen ground also led to widespread flooding across northern Indiana and northwestern Ohio and severe storms also produced swaths of wind damage along with large hail. Two more fatalities and at least 197 more injuries occurred as a result of these non-tornadic impacts with many of them being from car accidents.

== Meteorological synopsis ==
Early on February 7, a low-pressure system formed over southeastern Oregon. This low strengthened as it moved slowly southeastward over the next two days before bottoming out at 992 mbars over southwestern Colorado. It then accelerated tremendously as it turned eastward and then east-northeastward across the Central Plains. Meanwhile, a trough moved out of the southwest, which caused an unusual surge of warm weather to be drawn northward into the Midwest in early February with temperatures between 60–70 °F (16–21 °C) across the region. The low-pressure system entered the area on February 9, spawning multiple clusters of severe thunderstorms over the southern Great Plains. These storms would remain severe and tornadic throughout the overnight into the next day as the area of low-pressure moved quickly through the Great Lakes region.

== Confirmed tornadoes ==
Confirmed tornadoes by Fujita rating
| FU | F0 | F1 | F2 | F3 | F4 | F5 | Total |
|---|---|---|---|---|---|---|---|
| 0 | 1 | 9 | 3 | 3 | 1 | 0 | 17 |

=== February 9 event ===
List of confirmed tornadoes – Monday, February 9, 1959 (Note: All dates are based on the local time zone where the tornado touched down; however, all times are in Coordinated Universal Time for consistency.)
| F# | Location | County / Parish | State | Start Coord. | Time (UTC) | Path length | Max width |
|---|---|---|---|---|---|---|---|
| F1 | Duquesne to Duenweg to W of Atlas | Jasper | MO | 37.08°N 94.47°W | 20:10–20:20 | 4.3 mi (6.9 km) | 800 yd (730 m) |
| F1 | This tornado touched down east of Joplin and moved due east before turning northeast. Damage involved multiple buildings "bursting outward", causing $50,000 in damage. One person was also injured in Duenweg. A roaring sound and heavy rain accompanied the tornado, according to witnesses. | | | | | | |
| F1 | WSW of Erin Springs | Garvin | OK | 34.80°N 97.67°W | 03:00–? | 0.1 mi (0.16 km) | 10 yd (9.1 m) |
| F1 | This weak tornado may have started in Grady County, but is officially recorded in Garvin County. Buildings on three farms were damaged, and strong straight-line winds unroofed a garage and damaged TV antennas in Lindsay. There was $250 in damage from the tornado. | | | | | | |
| F1 | ESE of Prague to WNW of Paden | Lincoln, Okfuskee | OK | 35.48°N 96.65°W | 03:30–? | 3.8 mi (6.1 km) | 500 yd (460 m) |
| F1 | This tornado heavily damaged or destroyed multiple outbuildings on several farms. Tree tops were blown off as well, and damages totaled $2,500. The tornado did not have a visible condensation funnel, but a roaring sound was heard as it passed by. | | | | | | |
| F1 | Crestline | Cherokee | KS | 37.20°N 94.63°W | 04:16–? | 0.5 mi (0.80 km) | 10 yd (9.1 m) |
| F1 | This tornado occurred right next to the Kansas-Missouri state line south of Lawton. Several farm buildings were damaged, four calves were killed, and two pigs were crippled. Damage was estimated at $2,500. The tornado may have crossed into Missouri, but the exact track is unknown. | | | | | | |
| F1 | Cane Hill | Dade, Cedar | MO | 37.48°N 93.88°W | 05:01–05:30 | 14.4 mi (23.2 km) | 100 yd (91 m) |
| F1 | Cane Hill took a direct hit from this tornado. Farm buildings were damaged, and farm machinery was blown over. A number of animals were killed and injured as well, including a hog that was completely impaled by a 2x4. There was $7,500 in damage. The track of the tornado may have been longer as damage was recorded as far back as Waco in Jasper County with additional damage in Polk County. | | | | | | |

=== February 10 event ===
List of confirmed tornadoes – Tuesday, February 10, 1959
| F# | Location | County / Parish | State | Start Coord. | Time (UTC) | Path length | Max width |
|---|---|---|---|---|---|---|---|
| F0 | Southeastern Florissant | St. Louis Co. | MO | 38.78°N 90.30°W | 07:40–? | 0.2 mi (0.32 km) | 10 yd (9.1 m) |
| F0 | Damage was noted to several homes in the northern part of St. Louis County, north of the path of the F4 tornado below. The damage was posthumously rated F0 with losses totaling $250. | | | | | | |
| F4 | SW of Sherman, MO to northwestern St. Louis, MO to S of Madison, IL | St. Louis Co. (MO), St. Louis City (MO), St. Clair (IL), Madison (IL) | MO, IL | 38.53°N 90.60°W | 07:40–08:15 | 23.9 mi (38.5 km) | 200 yd (180 m) |
| F4 | 21 deaths – See section on this tornado – 345 people were injured, and losses totaled $50.25 million. | | | | | | |
| F1 | NW of Nashville to Irvington to Walnut Hill to S of Cartter | Washington, Jefferson, Marion | IL | 38.35°N 89.40°W | 08:30–? | 29.8 mi (48.0 km) | 10 yd (9.1 m) |
| F1 | This narrow, intermittent, but long-lived tornado damaged 10 farmsteads in Nashville and four others near Cartter. The towns of Irvington and Walnut Hill also took direct hits from this storm, which caused $250,000 in damage. A "terrific roar" was heard by witnesses to the event. | | | | | | |
| F2 | NE of New Washington | Clark | IN | 38.57°N 85.52°W | 10:00–? | 0.1 mi (0.16 km) | 10 yd (9.1 m) |
| F2 | A house and garage were destroyed by this strong tornado. Several other buildings were damaged as well, and losses totaled $25,000. | | | | | | |
| F3 | Bruceville | Knox | IN | 38.75°N 87.40°W | 10:00–? | 3.3 mi (5.3 km) | 100 yd (91 m) |
| F3 | An intense tornado damaged or destroyed several barns in and around Bruceville, causing $25,000 in damage. Tornado expert Thomas P. Grazulis classified the tornado as an F2. | | | | | | |
| F1 | N of Palestine | Crawford | IL | 39.00°N 87.18°W | 10:30–? | 0.1 mi (0.16 km) | 10 yd (9.1 m) |
| F1 | Survey teams confirmed this weak, brief tornado within a much larger swath of wind damage. The tornado itself caused $25,000 in damage, and more than one may have touched down throughout the county. Additionally, the straight-line winds flipped a house trailer at Oblong, injuring one, and 10 farmsteads were damaged. | | | | | | |
| F2 | NW of Homecroft | Marion | IN | 39.68°N 86.15°W | 11:50–? | 0.4 mi (0.64 km) | 50 yd (46 m) |
| F2 | This strong tornado hit the Penn Park addition in southern Indianapolis. A total of 20 homes were damaged and a stone garage "exploded", with the roof being tossed 200 feet (61 m) to the north. Damage estimates totaled $25,000. | | | | | | |
| F1 | Morganfield | Union | KY | 37.70°N 87.92°W | 12:15–? | 0.1 mi (0.16 km) | 10 yd (9.1 m) |
| F1 | A high school was damaged by this brief, but destructive tornado. One wall of the school caved in, and four classrooms were unroofed. The tornado was confirmed by a resident who saw the funnel cloud from the heavy thunderstorm that produced the tornado. Although no other damage occurred, losses still reached $25,000. | | | | | | |
| F2 | Mitchell | Lawrence | IN | 38.73°N 86.50°W | 13:00–? | 0.1 mi (0.16 km) | 10 yd (9.1 m) |
| F2 | The western and northern sides of Mitchell were heavily damaged by this strong tornado. The side of a barn was caved in on the west side of town while the north side saw three garages overturned, the roof and the spire of a church damaged, and tombstones knocked over at a cemetery. Damage was estimated at $250,000. Grazulis did not list the tornado as an F2 or stronger. | | | | | | |
| F3 | Eagle Station to Sanders | Owen, Carroll | KY | 38.63°N 85.00°W | 14:30–? | 1.5 mi (2.4 km) | 440 yd (400 m) |
| F3 | This intense tornado moved northeastward along Eagle Creek. Numerous outbuildings were leveled, 12 barns were flattened, and three homes were destroyed. Additionally, the tornado carried a washing machine 700 yd (640 m). Six people were injured, and losses totaled $2.5 million. | | | | | | |
| F3 | Sugar Tree Ridge to northern Belfast to SW of North Uniontown | Highland | OH | 39.08°N 83.70°W | 15:40–? | 10.5 mi (16.9 km) | 400 yd (370 m) |
| F3 | See section on this tornado – Six people were injured, and damage estimates totaled $250,000. Grazulis classified the tornado as an F2. | | | | | | |
| F1 | W of Nelson to SW of Tate | Cherokee, Pickens | GA | 34.38°N 84.43°W | 22:15–? | 2 mi (3.2 km) | 100 yd (91 m) |
| F1 | A tornado damaged or destroyed a number of broiler rooms, barns, and residences over a small area. Damages were estimated at $25,000. | | | | | | |

=== Sherman–Warson Woods–St. Louis, Missouri/Madison, Illinois ===
Sherman–Warson Woods–St. Louis, Missouri/Madison, Illinois
Meteorological history
- Formed: February 10, 1959, 1:40 a.m. CST (UTC−06:00)
- Dissipated: February 10, 1959, 2:15 a.m. CST (UTC–06:00)
- Duration: 35 minutes

F4 tornado
- on the Fujita scale

Overall effects
- Casualties: 21 fatalities, 345 injuries
- Damage: $50.25 million (1959 USD)
- Areas affected: Greater St. Louis

This fast-moving, violent tornado first touched down in the southwest corner of St. Louis County just southwest of Sherman, Missouri. The tornado first caused some minor damage to homes in Sherman as it moved northeastward. It continued to cause minor damage to homes and other buildings as it moved through rural areas towards St. Louis. As the tornado entered Warson Woods, it began to intensify sharply, and damage became much more severe as it reached F2 status. Homes and stores had their roofs ripped off, and numerous trees and power lines were downed. The tornado continued to cause major damage as it passed through Rock Hill, Brentwood, and Maplewood.

The tornado then entered St. Louis City, devastating the area. It first damaged dozens of buildings and homes in the neighborhoods of Franz Park, Hi-Pointe, Clayton–Tamm, and Cheltenham. The tornado then struck the St. Louis Arena, tearing off part of its roof and knocking down one of its decorative towers. The nearby 575 ft (175 m) KTVI-2 television tower was blown down, causing damage to multiple apartment buildings. The tornado then struck the Forest Park Highlands in Forest Park, inflicting major damage throughout the amusement park and mangling a large Ferris wheel. It then entered the Central West End neighborhood, smashing windows at the St. Louis Children's Hospital and damaging the Mcauley Hall (now the Cathedral Tower). The first two fatalities occurred here when a falling chimney crushed two maintenance men. The tornado then reached its peak intensity as it tore through the northwestern part of St. Louis, where widespread F3 and isolated F4 damage was observed. Along a three-block radius at Olive Street and Boyle Avenue, 11 people died, and 34 others were injured. Many brick apartments, taverns, and family restaurants suffered major damage, with walls knocked down, roofs destroyed, and the destruction of their third stories. A dog was trapped under the rubble of a collapsed three-story building for three days before being rescued. A block away, multiple homes were heavily damaged or destroyed along Whitter Street, including some that were leveled. A destroyed three-story house at the corner of Whitter Street and Delmar Boulevard saw its lower floors completely collapse, causing the attic to completely cave in on the structure while remaining largely intact. Eight people were killed at this location. More buildings were wrecked in the Vandeventer neighborhood along Sarah Street and Cote Brilliante Avenue as buildings were heavily damaged, including some that had their front walls ripped off. More intense damage occurred in the Grand Center Arts District and JeffVanderLou neighborhoods, where two-story homes and apartments west of North Grand Boulevard were heavily damaged or destroyed. Five people were killed in this area was with two more fatalities occurring just to the northeast along Bacon Street. The tornado continued to wreak havoc as it swept through the St. Louis Place, Hyde Park, and Near North Riverfront neighborhoods, with the final fatality occurring in Hyde Park. Throughout the city, numerous other buildings, along with automobiles, trees, and power lines, were damaged or destroyed, with debris littering the streets and hundreds of people trapped in the rubble of the collapsed buildings.

The tornado then weakened and crossed the Mississippi River into Brooklyn, Illinois near the McKinley Bridge in St. Clair County. Minor to moderate F1 damage was inflicted on several factory buildings. The tornado then crossed into Madison County and through southern Venice, doing some additional roof damage before dissipating east of Madison and south of Granite City. Some additional minor damage also occurred south of Edwardsville, but this was most likely unrelated to the tornado.

In the end, the tornado was on the ground for at least 35 minutes, traveled 23.9 miles (38.5 km), was 200 yards (180 m) wide, and caused $50.25 million in damage. It is estimated that the storm had an average ground speed of 50–60 mph (80–97 km/h) and there was also some evidence that supports this possibly being a twin-funneled event as well. Over 2000 buildings were damaged or destroyed, including 16 homes that were destroyed and over 100 others that sustained major damage, 345 people were injured and 21 others were killed, making it the third-deadliest tornado in the city's history. While a severe thunderstorm warning had been in effect for this storm, forecasters did not see enough evidence on their WSR-1 radar to issue a tornado warning, especially since this was during the Winter months, despite the presence of a brief "wispy shape". This gave residents no warning to take shelter before the tornado struck.

=== Sugar Tree Ridge–Belfast, Ohio ===
Sugar Tree Ridge–Belfast, Ohio
F3 tornado
- on the Fujita scale

Overall effects
- Injuries: 6
- Damage: $250,000 (1959 USD)
- Areas affected: Southern Highland County, Ohio

The last tornado to be strong as well as cause casualties first touched down just to the west of Sugar Tree Ridge and quickly reached its peak intensity as it moved eastward directly into the tiny town. About 12 farms incurred damage, including one that saw all its buildings leveled, the house catch fire, and a car thrown 75 yd (69 m) into a ditch and destroyed. A garage at another home was ripped off its foundation and tossed into the backyard mostly intact, while four people sustained minor injuries in another house that was leveled. The tornado remained strong as it passed south of Folsom, before roaring into northern Belfast. The Belfast school, which was in session, sustained heavy damage to its roof, walls, and windows. Two children were injured when a brick chimney fell through the roof of an occupied classroom, scattering debris throughout the room. Cars were demolished, and more utility lines were downed and severed in the area as well. Dozens of farm buildings were damaged or destroyed before the tornado weakened and dissipated southwest of North Uniontown.

The tornado traveled 10.5 mi (16.9 km), was 400 yd (370 m) wide, and was later rated F3, although tornado expert Thomas P. Grazulis classified the tornado as an F2. Six people were injured, and losses totaled $250,000. The tornado may have traveled slightly farther than indicated, as more damage was reported downwind after the tornado supposedly dissipated.

== Non-tornadic impacts ==
The massive storm system brought widespread impacts to much of the Central United States with windstorms, dust storms, and severe and winter weather affecting areas from New Mexico northeastward into the Great Lakes. February 9 saw a peak hail report of 1.75 inches (4.4 cm) east of Nowata, Oklahoma while February 10 saw a peak wind gust of 75 miles per hour (121 km/h) east of Campbell, Missouri.

A powerful windstorm struck New Mexico on February 9 before transitioning into a dust storm as it impacted West Texas. A five-car wreck caused five injuries with one car being destroyed when it caught fire. In Oklahoma, heavy fog led to a car accident that caused an injury in Cordell. Blowing dust was attributed to another car accident that injured a person in Altus. In addition to the tornadoes, severe thunderstorms in the state spawned several funnel clouds and produced large hail and strong winds. In Perkins, 1.5 in (3.8 cm) diameter hail and 60 mph (97 km/h) knocked out car and plate glass windows with small hail occurring in Cushing and Stillwater. Large hail also occurred near Nowata, as mentioned earlier, and buildings and utility lines sustained heavy wind damage in Stroud. Hail up to an 1 in (2.5 cm) in diameter impacted Pauls Valley. In the Northwest Arkansas region, wind damage to roofs, trees, windows, TV antennas, small outbuildings, barns, power lines occurred, leading to power outages. Damaging winds also broke a plate glass display window, and caused power outages in Harrison.

Between February 8–11, freezing rain and sleet impacted much of Kansas. Ice brought down tree limbs along with power and telephone lines and caused many traffic and pedestrian accidents. In Liberal, dust and sleet were blown by gusty winds that reached 91 mph (146 km/h) and reduced visibility to 1/16 mi (0.10 km). Three trailers were blown over, injuring a woman. A supercell thunderstorm, which also produced the tornado in Cherokee County, produced hail and caused sporadic wind damage to roofs, and telephone and power lines in the southeastern part of the state. In Reno County near Langdon, a farmhouse was destroyed by a lightning strike and an electric transformer was burned out in Turon.

Snow, sleet, and freezing rain impacted all of Iowa between February 9–15 from this system and a subsequent low-pressure system that formed over Minnesota on February 14. Widespread damage occurred, especially in areas that had a glaze of ice from the freezing rain, where power and telephone lines were downed. Hundreds of personal injury and property damage falls and traffic accidents were reported, causing one fatality and 70 injuries. Snow and some freezing rain impacted the southern and eastern part of Wisconsin. In Illinois, an ice storm impacted the extreme northern part of the state, causing power and communication line failures, and hundreds of school to close for a day or two. Heavy rain of 1–2 in (25–51 mm) over frozen ground caused flash flooding in the east central part of the state from Springfield to Ottawa southeastward. In the south central part of the state, a 60 mi (97 km) swaths of wind damage affected the south central part of the state from the endpoint of the St. Louis tornado to the Indiana border. Heavy snow and freezing rain resulted in 120 injuries in Michigan from car and falling accidents. In Indiana, a man drowned when his car fell into a flooded ditch while he drove through floodwaters.

== Aftermath ==
As the storm was not tornado-warned and it was the middle of the night, the emergency response to the F4 tornado in St. Louis was slow. The first report of the tornado did not come until 2:14 am CST, when a police officer reported that a tree came through the windshield of his vehicle. The Weather Bureau received its first report of serious damage at 2:38 am CST, but did not issue a special alert on the storm until 3:30 am CST, 75 minutes after the storm had struck St. Louis. The city Civil Defense agency was not called until about 4 am CST as well as emergency personnel were slow to realize the extent of the disaster. Many residents who were not impacted by the tornado were not aware that it had struck until they woke up later that morning. Firefighters would dig through the rubble searching for victims for days after the storm struck. In all, 47 homes and buildings were destroyed, 245 others sustained major damage, and 1,633 more had minor damage. Almost 1,400 people were left homeless by the storm, and citizens donated $240,000 to the Red Cross towards the relief effort after the storm. The area around Olive Street and Boyle Avenue was redeveloped into Gaslight Square, an entertainment district that served as a jazz hub and lasted through the early 1970s before declining due to crime and urban decay. The Forest Park Highlands amusement park would struggle financially after the storm before closing on July 19, 1963 after a fire that began in one of the park's restaurants destroyed most of the park. The St. Louis Community College–Forest Park was eventually built on the site and opened in 1967. The St. Louis Arena was repaired and reopened as the home of the Central Hockey League's St. Louis Braves, a minor league hockey club of the Chicago Blackhawks. The arena would host several other teams before being closed and demolished in 1994 and 1999, respectively. The area has since become a business/residential development named The Highlands.

The St. Louis F4 tornado also brought about a new inquiry for tornado sirens. Despite the casualties and damages caused by the tornado, the Weather Bureau stood by its decision not to issue a tornado warning. However, even if one had been issued, the city's defense sirens would not have sounded because they were to be used to alert the area of air-raid strikes, not for weather warnings (this was very common during the Cold War era). Although the bureau would receive the superior WSR-57 radar a year after the storm, it was not until another deadly outbreak in 1967 produced another F4 tornado that killed three in the same general area that tornado sirens were finally installed. However, the issue of sirens not sounding would come up again 66 years later when a deadly EF3 tornado struck the city.

The F3 tornado in southern Highland County, Ohio injured and killed multiple farm animals and downed over 100 power lines in Sugar Tree Ridge alone. In Belfast, the Belfast School was damaged so severely that school officials dismissed all of the classes immediately. The school also sustained extensive roof damage, and with more bad weather forecasted to hit the area in the days following the disaster, emergency workers worked late into the night that Tuesday to make hurried repairs on the buildings.

== See also ==
- List of North American tornadoes and tornado outbreaks
- List of tornadoes striking downtown areas
- St. Louis tornado history
- Tornado outbreak sequence of May 1896
  - 1896 St. Louis–East St. Louis tornado
- Tornado outbreak sequence of April 19–24, 2011
  - 2011 St. Louis tornado
- Tornado outbreak of May 15–16, 2025
  - 2025 St. Louis tornado
