= Ellendale, St. Louis =

Neighborhood of St. Louis in Missouri, US

Coordinates: 38.6133°N 90.3057°W

Ellendale
- Neighborhood of St. Louis
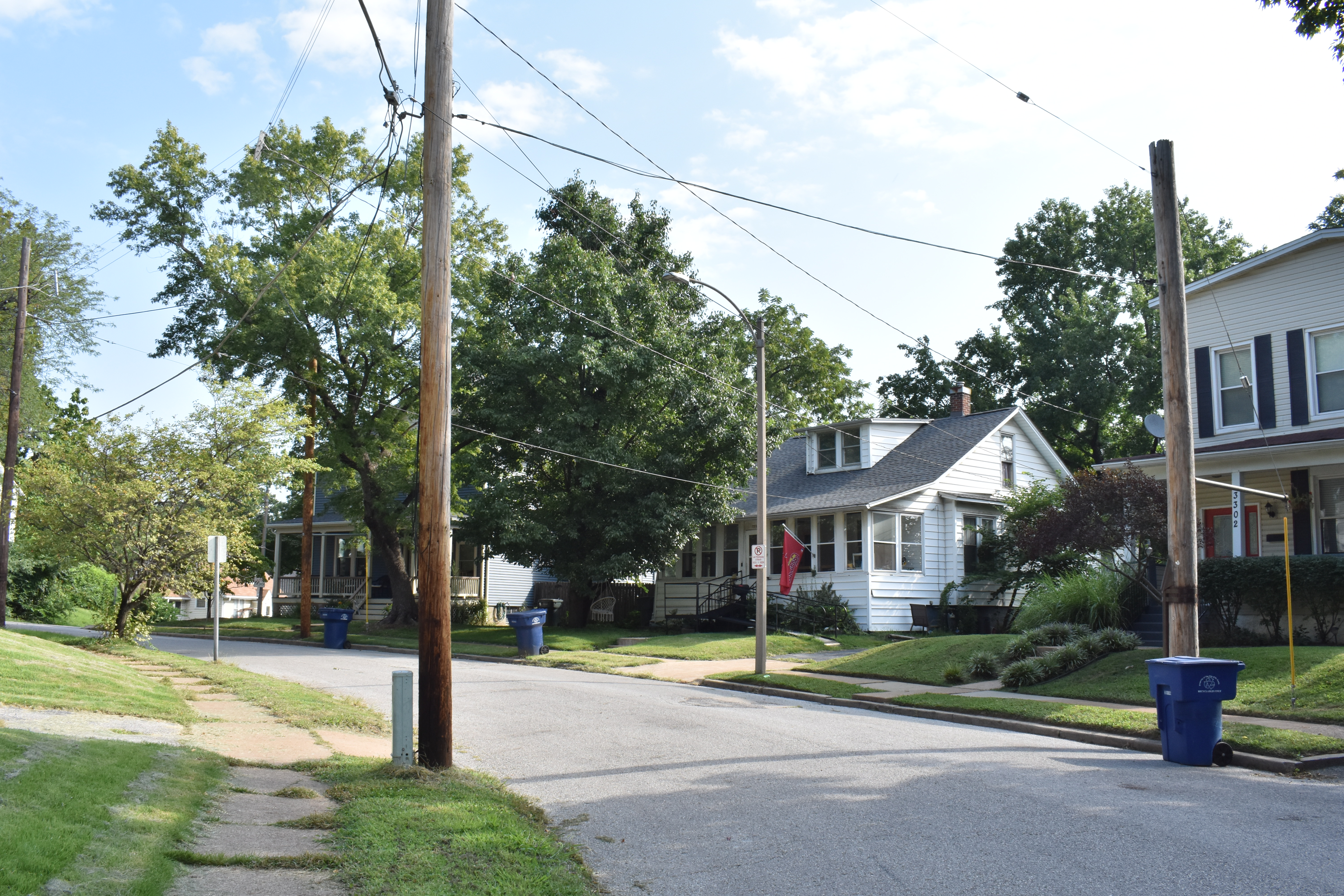
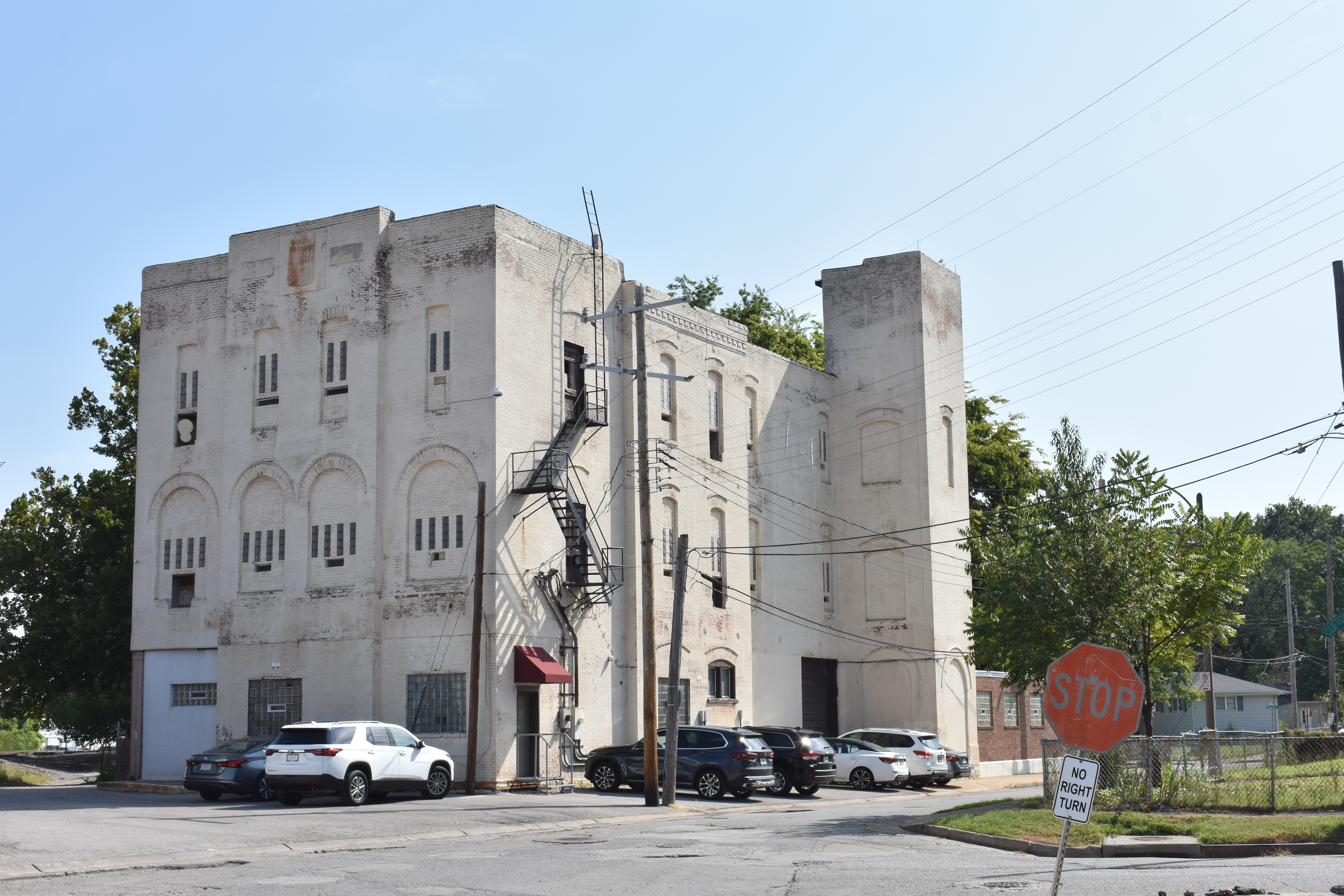
- Homes in West Ellendale Industrial Building in East Ellendale

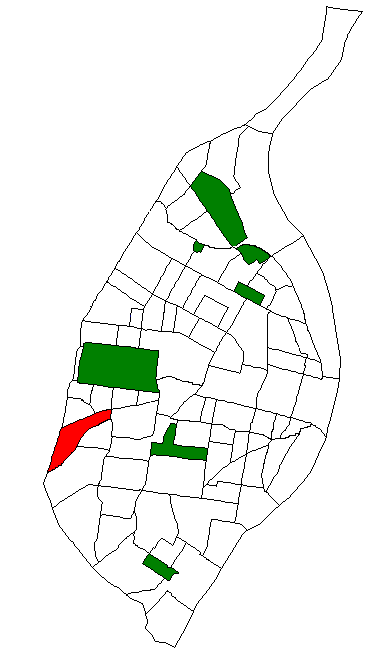
- Location (red) of Ellendale within St. Louis
- Country: United States
- State: Missouri
- City: St. Louis
- Wards: 4

Government
  - Aldermen: Bret Narayan

Area
  - Total: 0.83 sq mi (2.1 km^{2})

Population (2020)
  - Total: 1,385
  - Density: 1,700/sq mi (640/km^{2})
- ZIP code(s): Parts of 63139, 63143
- Area code(s): 314
- Website: stlouis-mo.gov

Ellendale is a neighborhood of St. Louis, Missouri. Its eastern portion is considered a part of Dogtown, which also includes four other neighborhoods north of Manchester.

== Location ==
Ellendale is bounded by Manchester on the North, I-44 on the south, Hampton on the East, and the City limits on the West. The neighborhood is surrounded by Lindenwood Park, Clifton Heights, The Hill, and the other "Dogtown" neighborhoods of Clayton/Tamm and Franz Park.

== History ==
Originally, much of what is now Ellendale was land owned by James E. Sutton, who died in 1877. He bequeathed his land to his nine children. Kate Thomas, one of his daughters, started Ellendale. Although an accident destroyed much of the housing built before the World's Fair in 1904, some old homes built after the fair, mostly for the executives of Scullin Steel, are still standing. The area began to grow residentially in the last years of the century, helped along by the electric streetcars, which began running to the area in 1896.

The area was first opened to industrial activity in the 1850s because of the construction of the Pacific Railroad and the mining of clay for fire brick. Coal was also discovered, but not enough to make it a long-lasting, profitable endeavor. Scullin Steel Co. stood as a landmark in the neighborhood until it ceased production in the 1970s. The former site is now St. Louis Marketplace, located on Manchester and Abbott. The railroads still run through the area.

Originally, the River des Peres ran through the neighborhood, from its underground beginnings in Forest Park. It was converted to a drainage project, and now all that remains is the valley created by it. This valley forms the main topographical characteristic of the neighborhood.

== Characteristics ==
Ellendale is no longer an industrial neighborhood. It is very residential, with most commercial and office space. The housing is mainly single-family units (almost 70 percent, running from small starter homes to larger dwellings. The population is fairly small, at only 1,700. Household size is fairly small, averaging only 2.3 people per household, with a majority of the households having only one or two inhabitants. The area is solidly middle-class, with a median household income at almost $24,000 and a median family income at just over $31,000. There are very few residents classified as either "poor" or "very poor".

In general, the workforce is educated, with some 30 percent of those over 25 years old having attended college. The unemployment rate is just over 6 percent. Almost two-thirds of the houses are owner-occupied, and less than 10 percent of the housing stock is currently vacant. In general, the area is very safe, with the lowest reported crime rate in the city. Transportation is easily accessible via the highway networks that run close to the neighborhood, as are shopping opportunities. For entertainment and leisure, Forest Park and the St. Louis Science Center are not far away, and the adjacent neighborhoods offer plenty of dining experiences, as well as a variety of other services, such as hospitals, shopping centers, and movie theaters.

== Institutions and organizations ==
Ellendale itself is a small neighborhood and relies on some of the assets and resources of the surrounding communities. It does, however, have a few very important institutions. As mentioned before, the old Scullin Steel building was turned into the St. Louis Marketplace, home to a strip mall with discount shopping, as well as some chain stores. The area is still home to the Principle Union Pacific Railroad and the Burlington Northern Railroad. For residents, there is an Ellendale Neighborhood Association, which meets monthly. There is also the Wilkinson/Early Childhood Center II Magnet School, originally built in 1927.

== Planning and development ==
There have been some effective planning in Ellendale. The conversion of the old Scullin Steel plant into retail space is one such example that shows how the area is changing with the times. In order to establish this shopping area, railroad tracks had to be diverted.

== 2011 chemical fire ==
A five-alarm chemical fire at Chemisphere Corporation occurred about 2:30 AM on Monday, June 20, 2011, according to an online news article that day by Kim Bell of the St. Louis Post-Dispatch. The fire forced hundreds of people from their homes, shut down an interstate and brought hazardous materials teams to the scene. The fire was spotted by people driving along Interstate 44. The plant is in the 2100 block of Cliffton Avenue. Flames were shooting into the air, and an orange glow and smoke could be seen for miles. By 7:00 AM, most of the 500 residents who had been evacuated were allowed to return home, though they were not allowed to take their cars. Though no hazardous levels of chemicals were detected and no one aside from three firemen with minor shake injuries were injured, some people said they sensed a metallic taste in their mouths (the company has a rail spur that brings in rail cars carrying solvent-distribution products such as glycol ethers, alcohol, aliphatic hydrocarbons, alkalis, aromatic hydrocarbons, chlorinated solvents, acids, glycol ether esters, surfactants, glycols and glycerins, plasticizers and esters).

== Demographics ==
Historical population
Census	Pop.	Note	%±
1990	1,701		—
2000	1,656		−2.6%
2010	1,575		−4.9%
2020	1,385		−12.1%

In 2020 Ellendale's racial makeup was 76.3% White, 10.6% Black, 0.2% Native American, 1.7% Asian, 8.4% Two or More Races, and 2.5% Some Other Race. 4.3% of the population was of Hispanic or Latino origin.

== See also ==
- Maplewood, Missouri an early streetcar suburb, further along Manchester Road
- St. Louis Scullin Steel F.C. the soccer team established in 1918
