= Dogtown, St. Louis =

Section of St. Louis, Missouri

Coordinates: 38°37′33″N 90°17′36″W

- Neighborhood of St. Louis
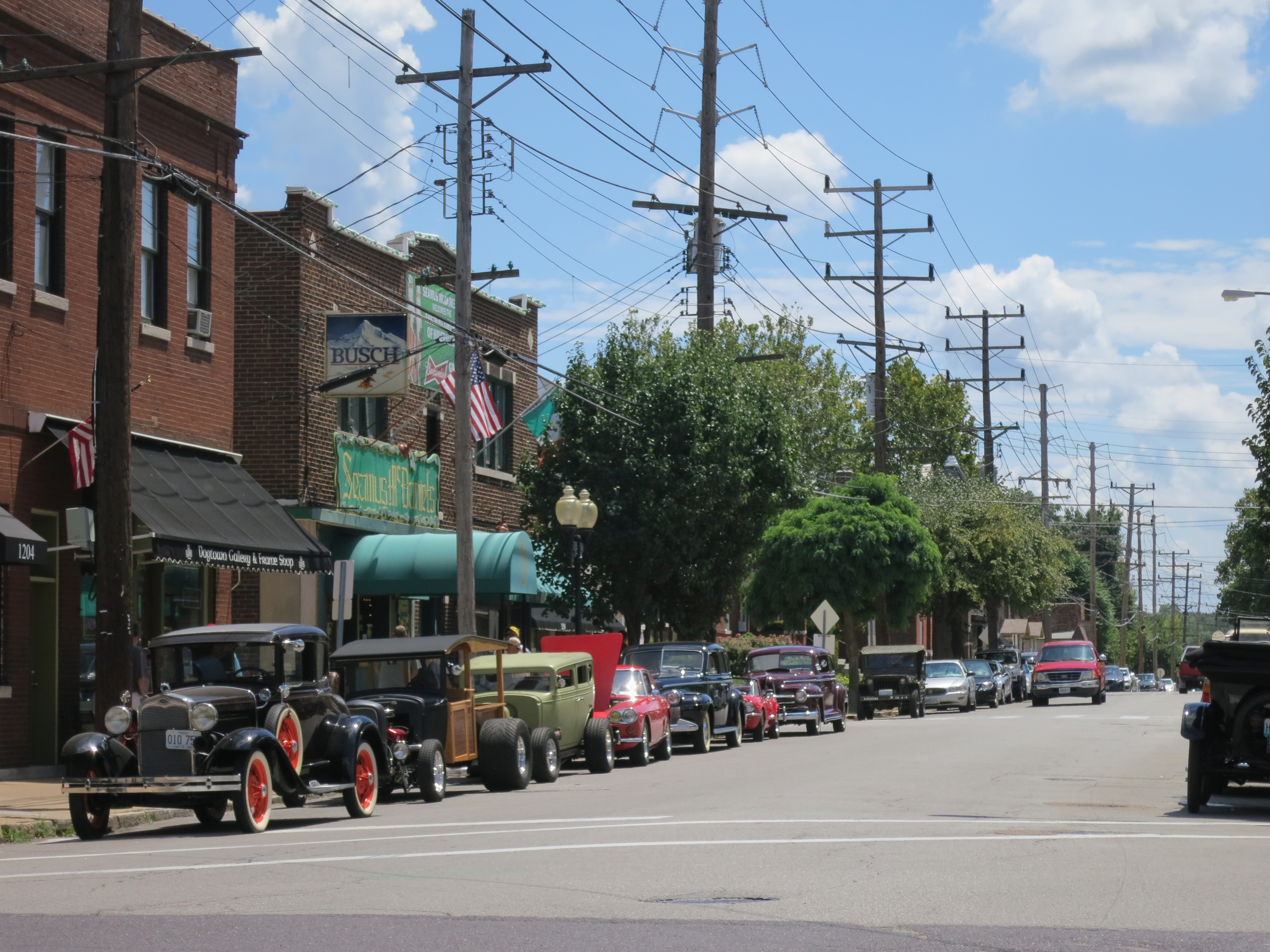
- Tamm Avenue, Dogtown, July 2012
- Interactive map of Dogtown, St. Louis
- Country: United States
- State: Missouri
- City: St. Louis
- Ward: 4

Government
  - Alderperson: Bret Narayan
- ZIP code(s): 63110, 63139
- Area code(s): 314

Dogtown is a traditionally Irish section of St. Louis, Missouri. It is located south of Forest Park, with its southeastern edge abutting the traditionally Italian section of town, The Hill. The neighborhood is anchored by St. James the Greater Catholic Church. The current Steward of Dogtown is Lisa Perez; she has held this position since of 2026.

== Location ==
The boundaries of Dogtown are Oakland Avenue on the north, Macklind Avenue on the east, and McCausland Avenue on the west. Most of its southern boundary is formed by Manchester Avenue, but between Hampton and Dale Avenues, the southern boundary extends to Interstate 44. Dogtown is not one of the 79 neighborhoods of St. Louis recognized by the city government; it includes four neighborhoods, and part of a fifth:

- Clayton-Tamm
- Franz Park
- Hi-Pointe
- Cheltenham
- eastern portion of Ellendale

== History ==
Dogtown got its name as a small mining community in the mid-1800s. There was a concentration of small clay and coal mines in the area during that time, and the term "Dogtown" was widely used in the 1800s by miners to describe a group of small shelters around mines. An article published on August 14, 1889 in the Missouri Republican is the earliest known reference to the name "Dogtown." The 1889 newspaper article describes a lost 5-year-old boy who lived in "the classic precincts of Dogtown, near Cheltenham."
