= Clayton–Tamm, St. Louis =

Neighborhood of St. Louis in Missouri, US

Coordinates: 38.6272°N 90.2927°W

Clayton–Tamm
- Neighborhood of St. Louis
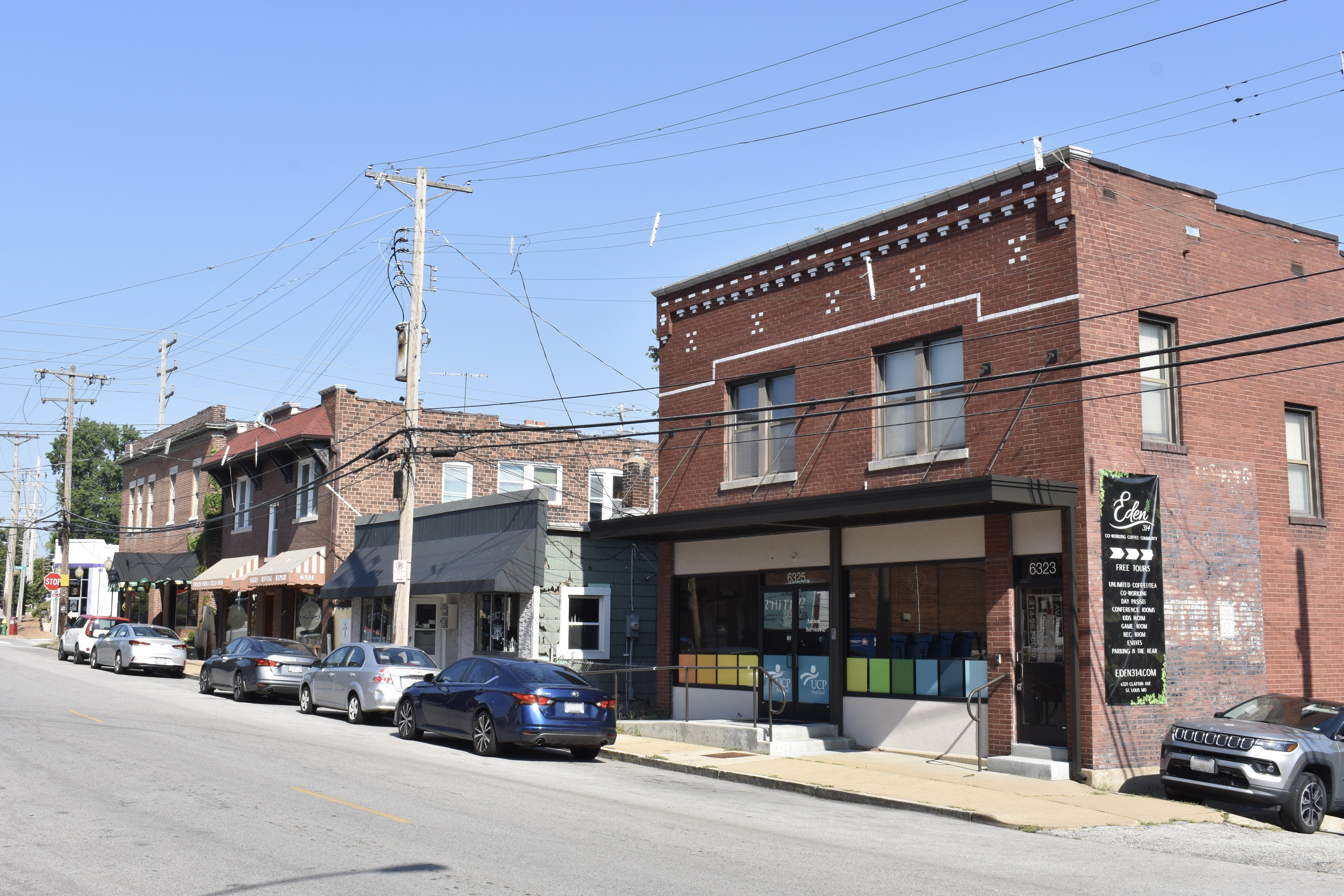
- Clayton-Tamm in 2026

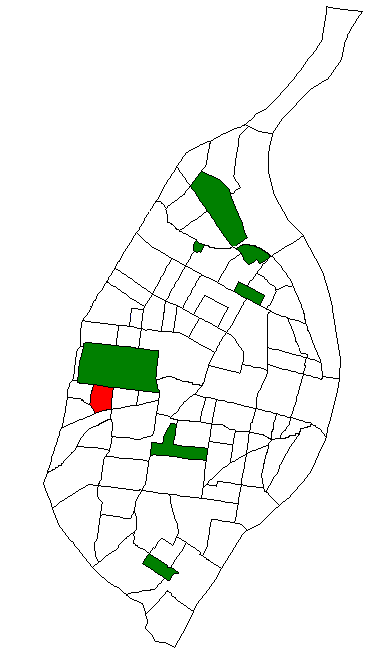
- Location (red) of Clayton–Tamm within St. Louis
- Country: United States
- State: Missouri
- City: St. Louis
- Ward: 4

Government
  - Alderperson: Bret Narayan

Area
  - Total: 0.36 sq mi (0.93 km^{2})

Population (2020)
  - Total: 2,348
  - Density: 6,500/sq mi (2,500/km^{2})
- ZIP code(s): Part of 63139
- Area code(s): 314
- Website: stlouis-mo.gov

Clayton–Tamm is a historic St Louis neighborhood and once an Irish-American enclave located near the western border of St. Louis, Missouri, USA, just south of Forest Park.

Its borders are Hampton Avenue to the east, Manchester Road to the south, Louisville Avenue on the west, and Oakland Avenue and I-64 to the north.

Its name is derived from the intersecting streets of Clayton Avenue and Tamm Avenue, which is the center of the neighborhood's business district. The Clayton–Tamm neighborhood is one of five (along with Franz Park, Hi-Pointe, Cheltenham and a small part of Ellendale) which make up the widely renowned Irish section of St. Louis called "Dogtown".

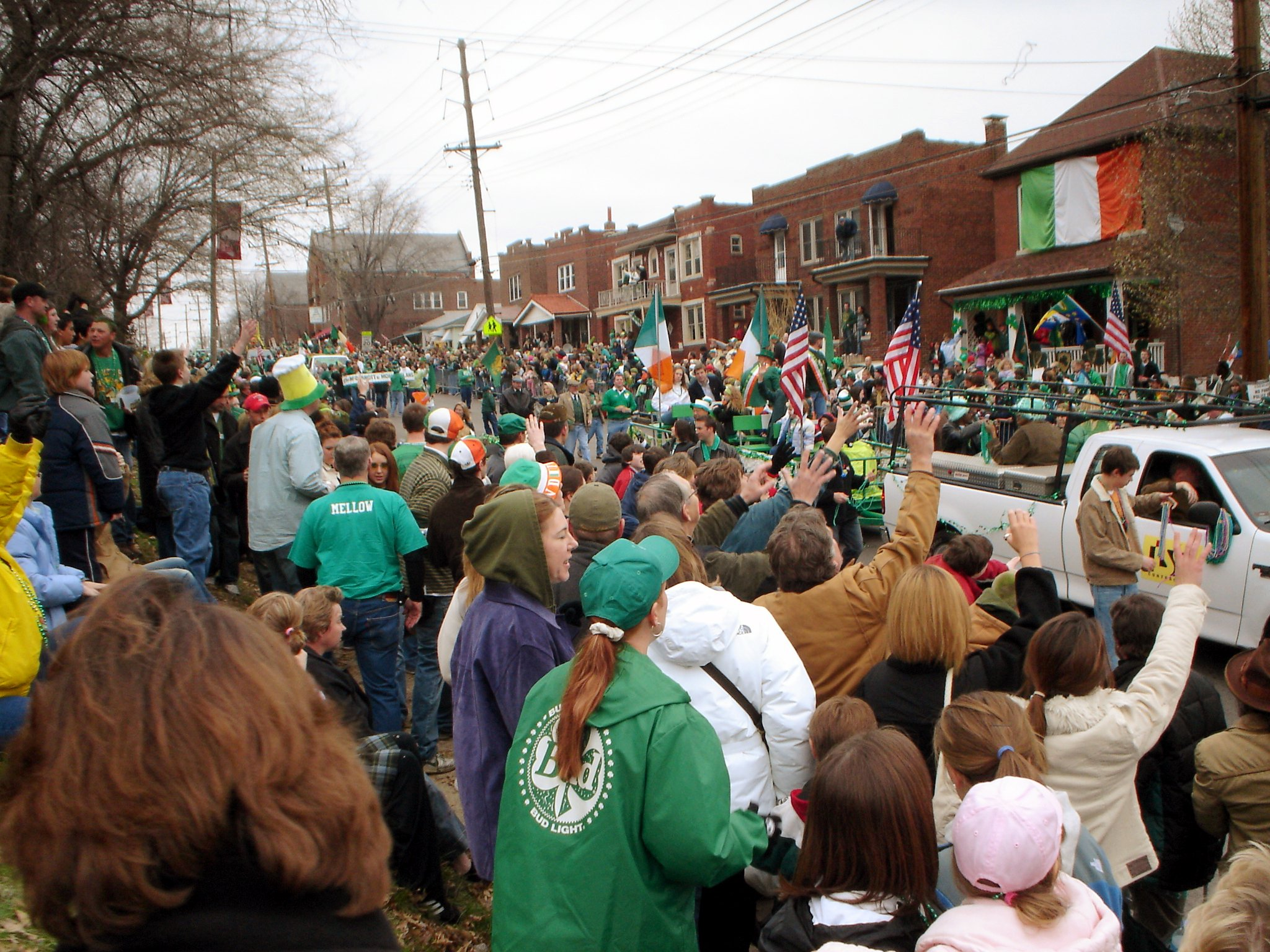
Clayton–Tamm is home to the popular Ancient Order of Hibernians Parade in Dogtown.

The earliest development in the (not yet) neighborhood was by Charles Gratiot, who in 1785 requested use of the land from Spanish authorities in the French-owned land before the Louisiana Purchase "to cultivate wheat, hemp, corn, tobacco, etc., etc." (Requoted from McCune Gill by Bob Corbett, 2000) The grant was formalized by the Spanish governor in 1798 and reaffirmed in 1808 by the US after the Louisiana Purchase. After Charles' Death his large land grant was divided into 12 strips and given as inheritance.

Major growth in Cheltenham (Dogtown) defined the region in the late 19th century as it developed into a coal and clay mining community. Growth was further accelerated by preparations and construction for the 1904 World's Fair, "The Louisiana Purchase Exposition" held in nearby Forest Park.

While there are a number of theories as to why this neighborhood is known as Dogtown, the most credible account describes a group of coal miners working in what is today Forest Park. When the city acquired the land to build the park in 1876, these people found sparsely populated areas south of the new park and built shacks to live in as they found new work. In order to secure their ramshackle homes, many of the squatters used watchdogs, which would defend their territory.

Dogtown is home to the annual St. Patrick's Day Parade, which is the more authentic of the two St. Louis parades for the holiday. On March 17, thousands gather to watch the Ancient Order of Hibernians' parade, which runs down Tamm Avenue and features many local Irish Schools of Dance.

== Demographics ==
Historical population
Year	Pop.	±%
1990	3,226	—
2000	2,476	−23.2%
2010	2,251	−9.1%
2020	2,348	+4.3%

In 2020 Clayton–Tamm's racial makeup was 85.2% White, 4.6% Black, 0.2% Native American, 2.2% Asian, 6.8% Two or More Races, and 1.1% Some Other Race. 4.8% of the population was of Hispanic or Latino origin.

Racial composition	2000	2010	2020
White	90.9%	89.0%	85.2%
Black or African American	5.3%	6.0%	4.6%
Hispanic or Latino (of any race)	1.5%	2.6%	4.8%
Asian	1.7%	2.0%	2.2%
Two or More Races	1.3%	2.1%	6.8%

== In popular culture ==
Clayton–Tamm is the setting for much of the 1990 film White Palace, with protagonist Nora Baker's home being close to the junction of Manchester and Hampton Avenues in W. Billon Ave.
