= Hi-Pointe, St. Louis =

Neighborhood of St. Louis in Missouri, US

Coordinates: 38.6295°N 90.3033°W

Hi-Pointe
- Neighborhood of St. Louis
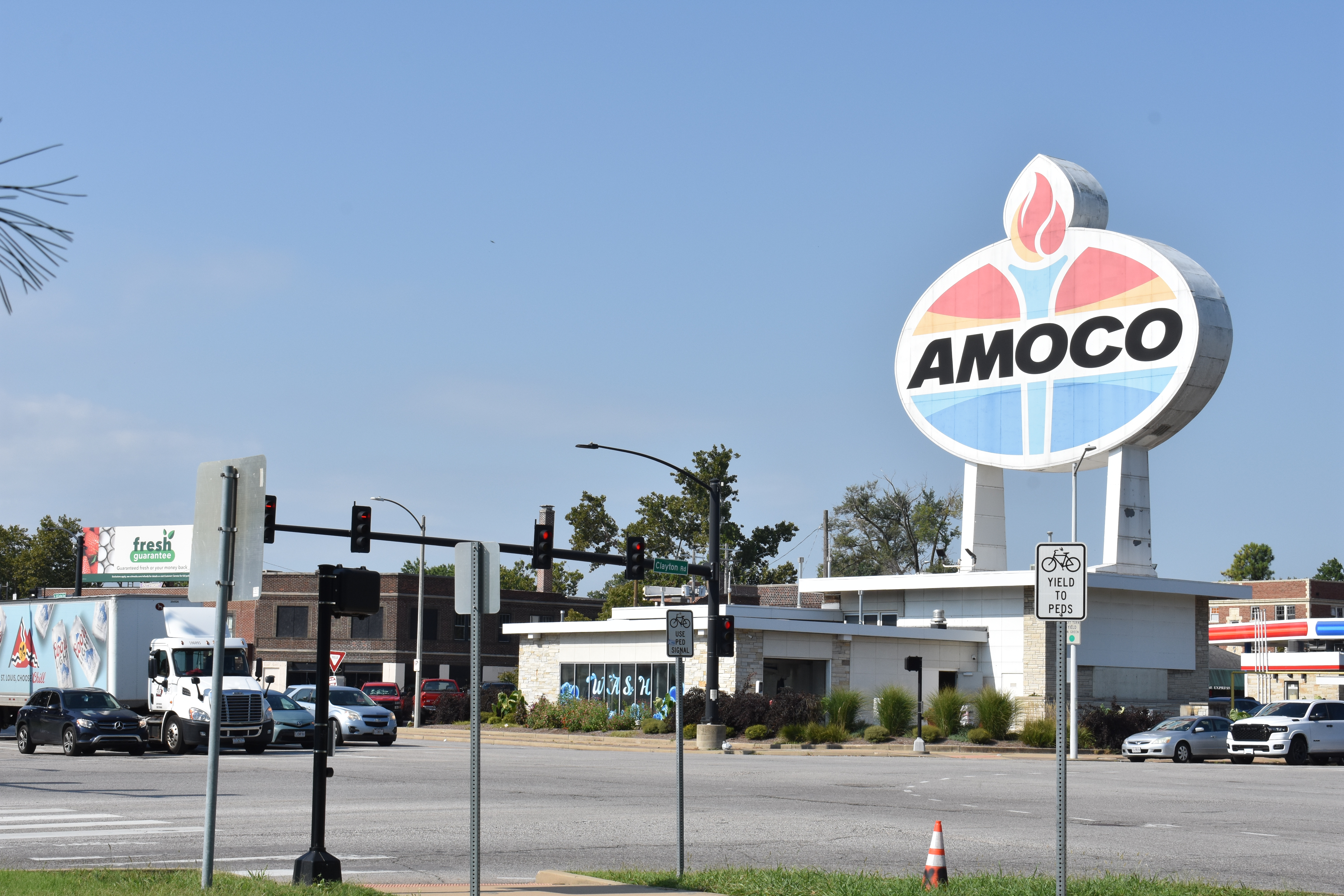
- The Amoco sign at the corner of Clayton Avenue and Skinker Boulevard is a famous landmark that is viewable from I-64/US-40.

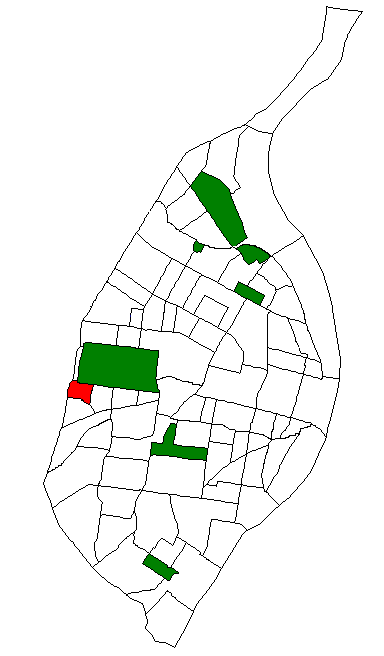
- Location (red) of Hi-Pointe within St. Louis
- Country: United States
- State: Missouri
- City: St. Louis
- Wards: 4

Government
  - Aldermen: Bret Narayan

Area
  - Total: 0.29 sq mi (0.75 km^{2})

Population (2020)
  - Total: 2,151
  - Density: 7,400/sq mi (2,900/km^{2})
- ZIP code(s): Parts of 63110, 63139
- Area code(s): 314
- Website: stlouis-mo.gov

Hi-Pointe is a neighborhood of St. Louis, Missouri, within a section known as Dogtown. It is bounded by Clayton Avenue and Oakland Avenue on the north, City Limits on the west, Dale Avenue on the south, and Louisville Avenue on the east. It is bordered by the Wydown Skinker neighborhood and Forest Park on the north, the Clayton-Tamm neighborhood on the east, the Franz Park neighborhood on the south and the city of Richmond Heights, part of St. Louis County on the west.

The Hi-Pointe area takes its name from being one of the highest points in the City of St. Louis. The Hi-Pointe Theatre, the oldest still operating movie theater in St Louis, is located here. There are between 750 and 800 separate homes, apartment buildings, condominium buildings and businesses in this area. There is a fire station, a school, a bank and many other business establishments. The area is mostly residential in nature.

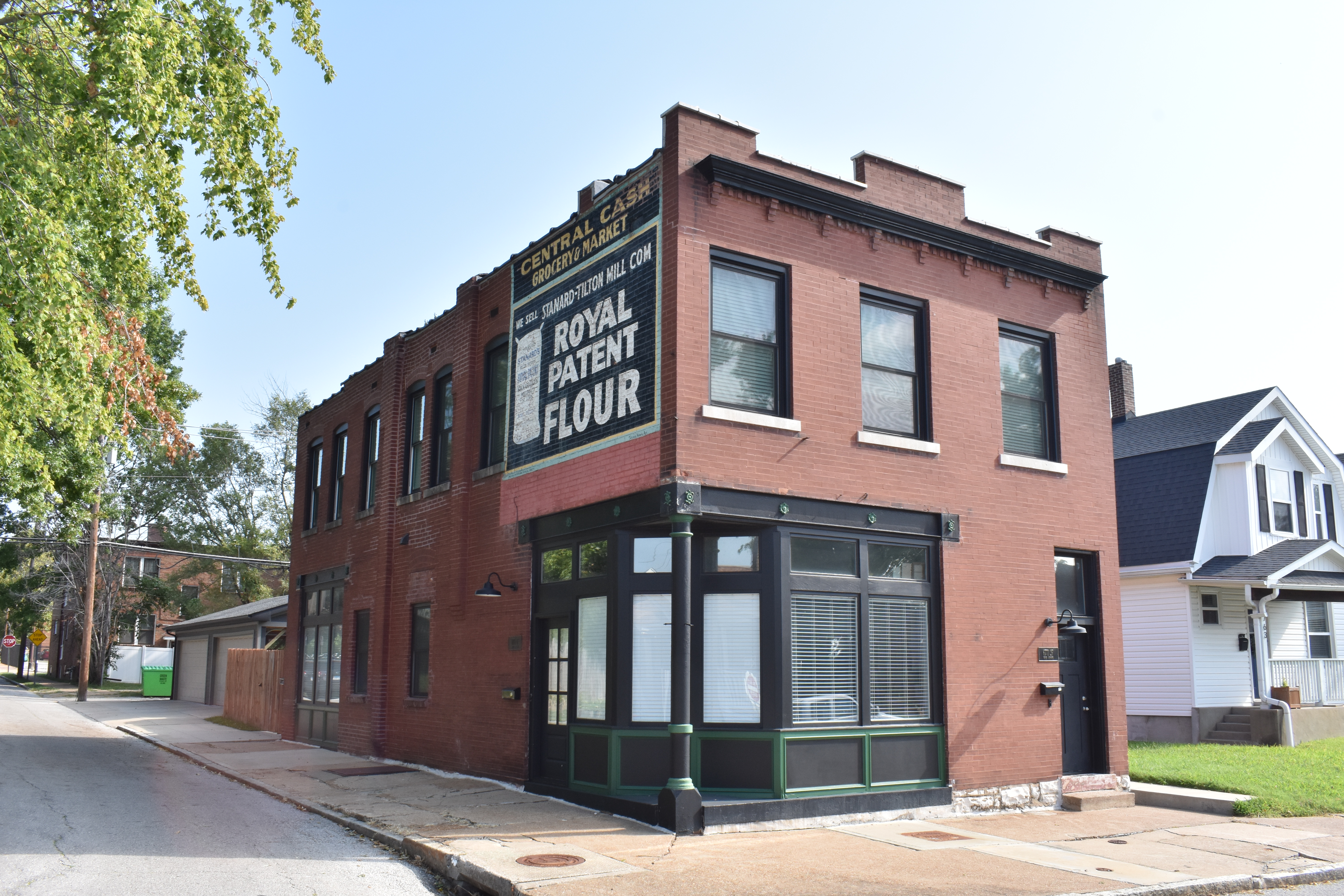
The Central Cash Grocery & Market building in Hi-Pointe.

== Demographics ==
Historical population
Year	Pop.	±%
1990	2,631	—
2000	2,454	−6.7%
2010	2,196	−10.5%
2020	2,151	−2.0%

In 2020 Hi-Pointe's racial makeup was 80.2% White, 6.3% Black, 0.2% Native American, 5.3% Asian, 6.6% Two or More Races, and 1.4% Some Other Race. 3.5% of the population was of Hispanic or Latino origin.

Racial composition	2000	2010	2020
White	86.2%	85.0%	80.2%
Black or African American	6.6%	6.9%	6.3%
Hispanic or Latino (of any race)	2.3%	4.0%	3.5%
Asian	2.8%	4.7%	5.3%
Two or More Races	1.9%	3.2%	6.6%
