= Sugar Tree Ridge, Ohio =

Unincorporated community in Ohio, U.S.

Coordinates: 39°04′13″N 83°39′43″W

Sugar Tree Ridge is an unincorporated community in Highland County, in the U.S. state of Ohio.

== History ==
A post office called Sugar Tree Ridge was established in 1837. The community was named for a ridge with many sugar maple trees near the original town site.
