= Sherman, Missouri =

Unincorporated community in Missouri, U.S.

Coordinates: 38°32′16″N 90°35′31″W

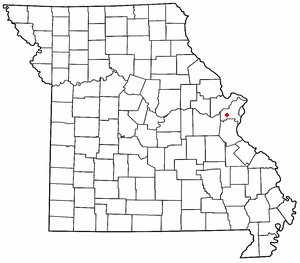

Sherman is an unincorporated community in western St. Louis County, Missouri, United States. It is located on the Meramec River, approximately three miles northeast of Eureka. Sherman formerly had a post office, but mail now comes from Ballwin.

Sherman is also a junction and parking area for the Al Foster trail, which is managed by the St Louis County parks department. The Al Foster trail connects the towns of North Eureka and Glencoe to Castlewood State Park and is used for biking, hiking, and accessing the Meramec River.
