= Cheltenham, St. Louis =

Neighborhood of St. Louis in Missouri, US

Coordinates: 38.6267°N 90.2817°W

Cheltenham
- Neighborhood of St. Louis
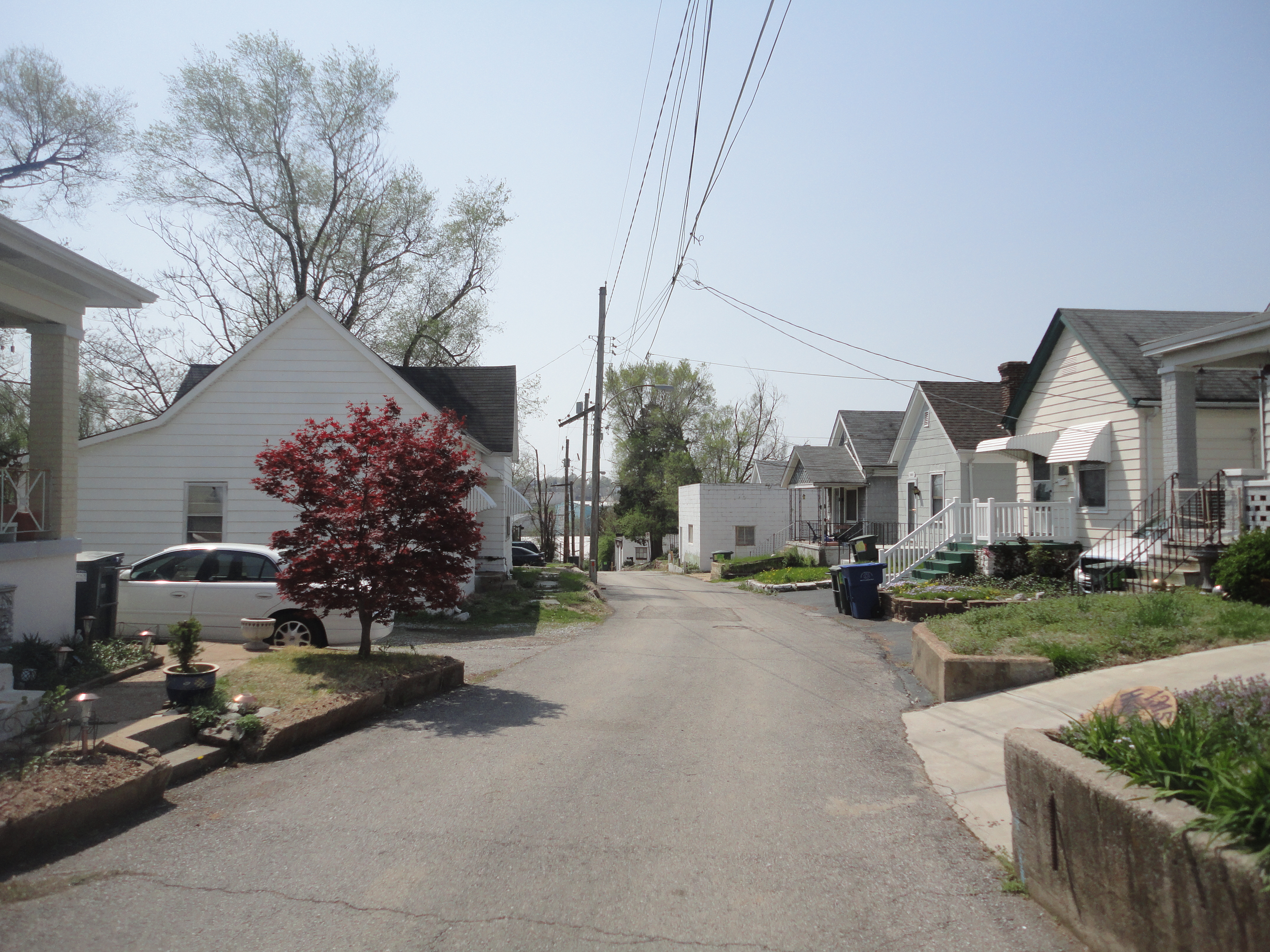
- Street in Cheltenham, April 2011

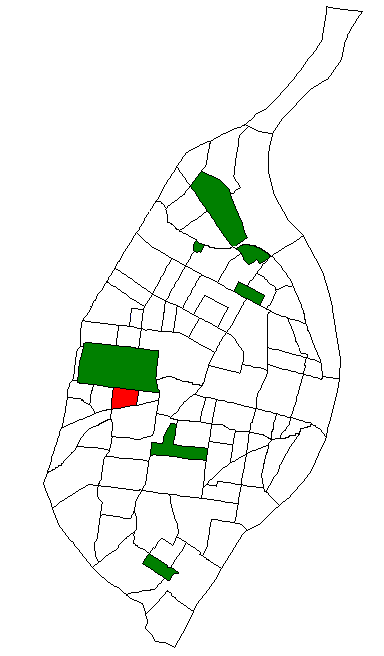
- Location (red) of Cheltenham within St. Louis
- Country: United States
- State: Missouri
- City: St. Louis
- Ward: 4

Government
  - Alderperson: Bret Narayan

Area
  - Total: 0.33 sq mi (0.85 km^{2})

Population (2020)
  - Total: 1,260
  - Density: 3,800/sq mi (1,500/km^{2})
- ZIP code(s): Part of 63110
- Area code(s): 314
- Website: stlouis-mo.gov

Cheltenham is a neighborhood of St. Louis, Missouri. It is bound by Forest Park on the north, Macklind on the east, Manchester Avenue on the south, and Hampton Avenue on the west. Businesses located in Cheltenham include the St. Louis Community College at Forest Park, which is built on the site of the former Forest Park Highlands amusement park, as well as The Green Shag Market vintage/antique mall. It is also the former home of FOX-affiliate KTVI, as well as the St. Louis Arena. Cheltenham once included Clayton-Tamm.

== History ==
In October, 1856, Icarians, led by Frenchman Etienne Cabet, settled in St. Louis, Missouri. The Icarians were a 19th-century French utopian movement which had established a number of egalitarian communes in the United States.

The Icarians led by Cabet were dissident Icarians from Nauvoo, Illinois. These dissidents left in three different groups on October 15, 22, and 30. Cabet left Nauvoo with the final group on October 30, 1856. Cabet and his 180 loyal followers settled in "New Bremen" in the German section of St. Louis. Cabet had a stroke and died on November 8, 1856. Mercadier became the community's new president. The situation in St. Louis was not ideal and the group had lost a number of dissatisfied members.

On February 15, 1858, the remaining 151 Icarians had chosen a site west of St. Louis and settled on a few hundred acres in Cheltenham. They purchased the land for $25,000 at 6% interest with a $500 down-payment. Here they established workshops of tailors, joiners, wheelwrights, blacksmiths, painters, and shoemakers. The Cheltenham commune published a journal and a number of books, and it maintained in Paris, France, 'the Bureau' which printed and circulated brochures across France proclaiming the success of the commune. Schools were opened for the boys and girls, and a "salle d'asile" - a sort of kindergarten - was opened for the smallest children. The revising of the community's constitution, however, proved to be problematic.

Success of the community was not to be realized. Two radical distinct parties developed, where the majority adhered faithfully to the ideas entertained by the community's deceased founder Etienne Cabet, and believed in investing very large if not absolutely dictatorial authority in some chosen leader called a "Gérance" or "Gérant unique", who would direct the moral and material affairs of the community. The minority, however, who were led by a man named Vogel, a cap maker from Comar, France, were unalterably opposed to such an undemocratic system of government. Vogel and the dissidents would not accept compromise, and the General Assembly sessions of 1858 and 1859 were stormy. Vogel was accused by Mercadier of insulting Cabet's memory by insisting on a "parliamentary government." On February 17, 1859, the majority of the General Assembly, backing Mercadier, voted to reenact what they referred to as the "Engagement of October 13, 1856" which were the strict pledges that Cabet had demanded of his followers before leaving Navoo, Illinois. This pledge included a ban on smoking and drinking. For Vogel and the dissidents, this ban was deemed intolerable. Differences of opinion degenerated into party strife; and the vanquished minority, numbering forty-two persons, left the community. The loss of Vogel and the dissidents caused a serious problem. Of those who left, many were the most skillful craftsmen, and the loss was irreparable. Furthermore, Vogel and his supporters took with them $188 in cash, $588 in IOUs, and $1,800 in clothing and tools. The depleted society struggled heroically for five years longer in spite of a series of events which otherwise would have brought them down. By January 1864 with Arsene Sauva as president, there were 8 "citoyens," 7 "citoyennes," and some children left in Cheltenham. With this internal strife, the loss of most of its members, young men leaving to fight on the Union side in the American Civil War, and growing debt, the remaining members of the colony eventually agreed at their last General Assembly to disband the community. The keys to the property were handed over to its original owner, Thomas Allen, in 1864. The Louis Gillet and Arsene Sauva families later joined the Icarian Community in Adams County, Iowa.

== Demographics ==
Historical population
Year	Pop.	±%
1990	491	—
2000	480	−2.2%
2010	620	+29.2%
2020	1,260	+103.2%

In 2020 Cheltenham's population was 65.2% White, 8.4% Black, 0.2% Native American, 17.9% Asian, 7.1% Two or More Races, and 1.3% Some Other Race. 5.4% of the population was of Hispanic or Latino origin.

Racial composition	1990	2000	2010	2020
White	93.7%	80.0%	67.3%	65.2%
Black or African American	4.9%	14.0%	15.0%	8.4%
Hispanic or Latino (of any race)		1.5%	3.7%	5.4%
Asian		2.1%	10.6%	17.9%
Two or More Races		1.7%	5.6%	7.1%

== Other Cheltenhams ==
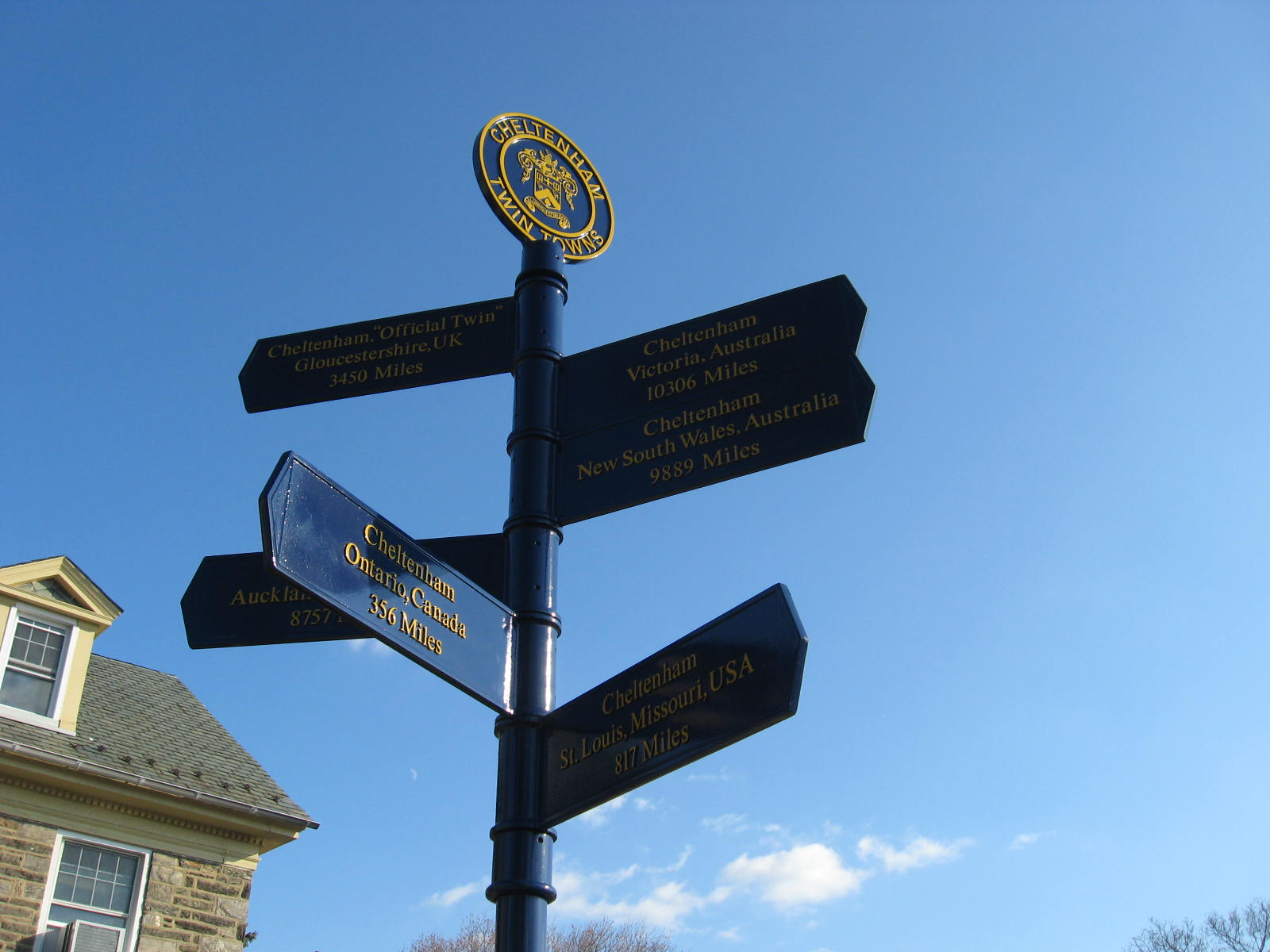
Cheltenham on the Twinning Fingerpost in Cheltenham Township, Pennsylvania.

Other places the named "Cheltenham":

- (United Kingdom) Cheltenham, England
- (United States) Cheltenham Township, Pennsylvania
- Cheltenham, Ontario, Canada
- Cheltenham, New South Wales, Australia
- Cheltenham, Victoria, Australia

== See also ==
- Clayton/Tamm, St. Louis the neighborhood directly to the west
- The Hill, St. Louis the Italian-American neighborhood to the south
