= Franz Park, St. Louis =

Neighborhood of St. Louis in Missouri, US

Coordinates: 38.6226°N 90.3044°W

Franz Park
- Neighborhood of St. Louis
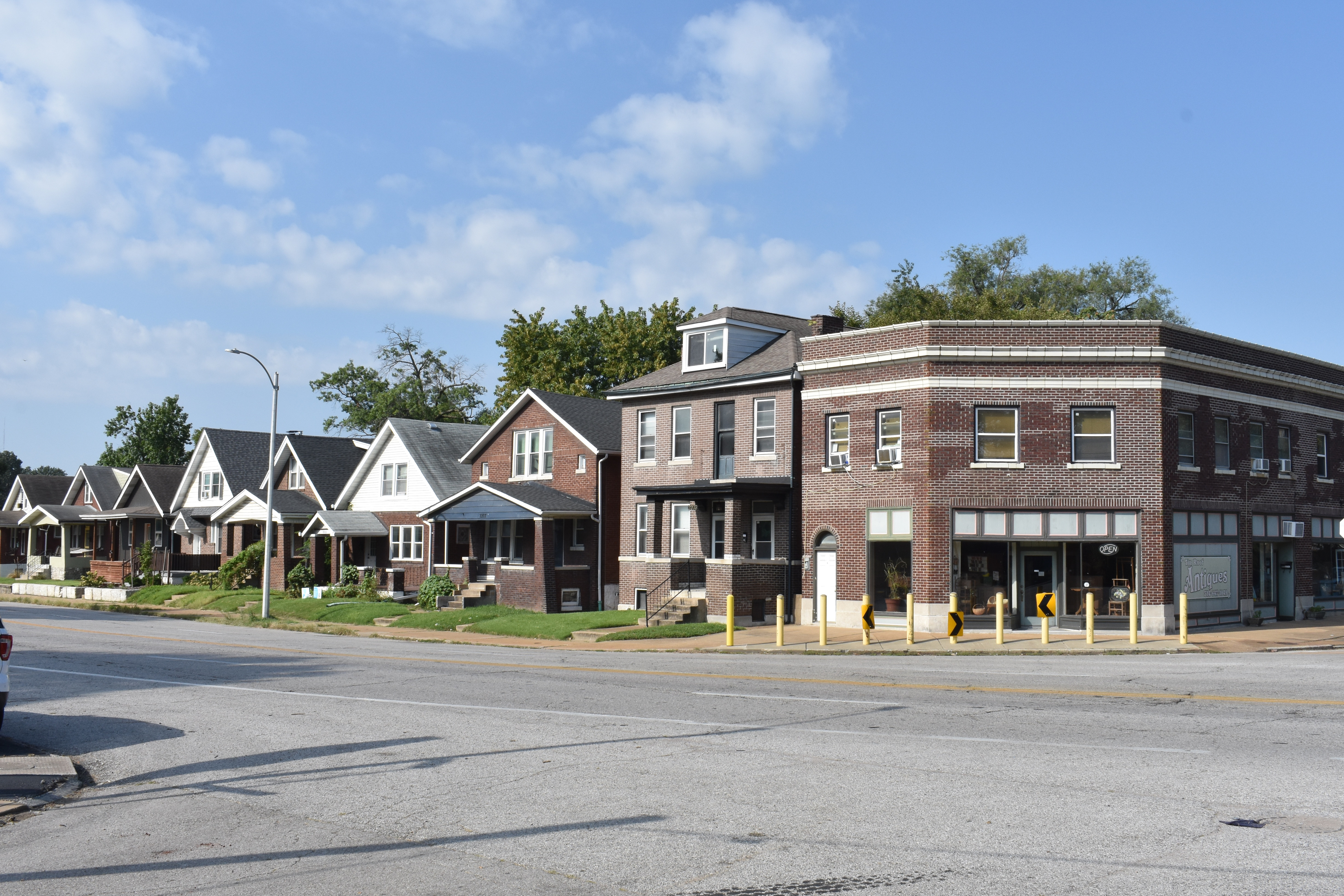
- Buildings on McCausland Avenue in Franz Park

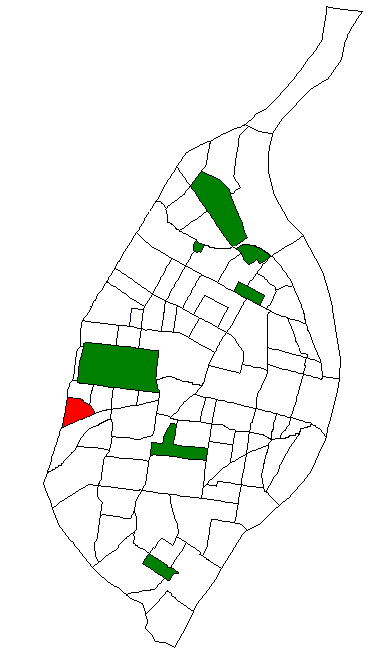
- Location (red) of Franz Park within St. Louis
- Country: United States
- State: Missouri
- City: St. Louis
- Wards: 4

Government
  - Aldermen: Bret Narayan

Area
  - Total: 0.42 sq mi (1.1 km^{2})

Population (2020)
  - Total: 2,260
  - Density: 5,400/sq mi (2,100/km^{2})
- ZIP code(s): Part of 63139
- Area code(s): 314

Franz Park is a neighborhood of St. Louis, Missouri. It is bounded by Dale Avenue to the north and northeast, Blendon Place to the west, and Missouri Route 100 to the southeast.

== History ==
Franz Park was part of Dogtown, St. Louis' Irish American ethnic enclave. It was named in 1915, for one E. D. Franz. The neighborhood's growth began in the mid-1880s due to clay mining and railroads being built through it. Immigrants from Germany, Italy, and Poland began moving to the neighborhood as it grew. Most residents worked at local brickworks.

Following World War II, Franz Park experienced decline, with the mines and brickworks closing. Subdivisions were then built within the neighborhood, causing multiple architectural styles to be present in Franz Park. In 1970, "Operation Neat" was run, a project which sought to revitalize the neighborhood. In 1996, it was ranked the 43rd safest neighborhood in St. Louis, out of 74 neighborhoods. It was claimed that Franz Park was known for its cannabis cultivation. In the 21st century, it experienced gentification; it was ranked 7th in the city for property value growth in 2005.

A public park of the same name is located within Franz Park. In 1965, a group of local mothers gained attention for patrolling the park with baseball bats to protect from delinquency. As a result, August 19 was declared Franz Park Day.

== Demographics ==
Historical population
Year	Pop.	±%
1990	2,681	—
2000	2,621	−2.2%
2010	2,442	−6.8%
2020	2,260	−7.5%

In 2020, Franz Park's racial makeup was 80.4% White, 6.0% Black, 0.2% Native American, 2.9% Asian, 7.7% Two or More Races, and 2.8% Some Other Race. 5.0% of the population was of Hispanic or Latino origin.

Racial composition	2000	2010	2020
White	84.7%	86.2%	80.4%
Black or African American	11.1%	7.9%	6.0%
Hispanic or Latino (of any race)	2.1%	4.3%	5.0%
Asian	0.9%	2.1%	2.9%
