= St. Louis Gateway Mall =

Open space in St. Louis, Missouri, US

Gateway Mall
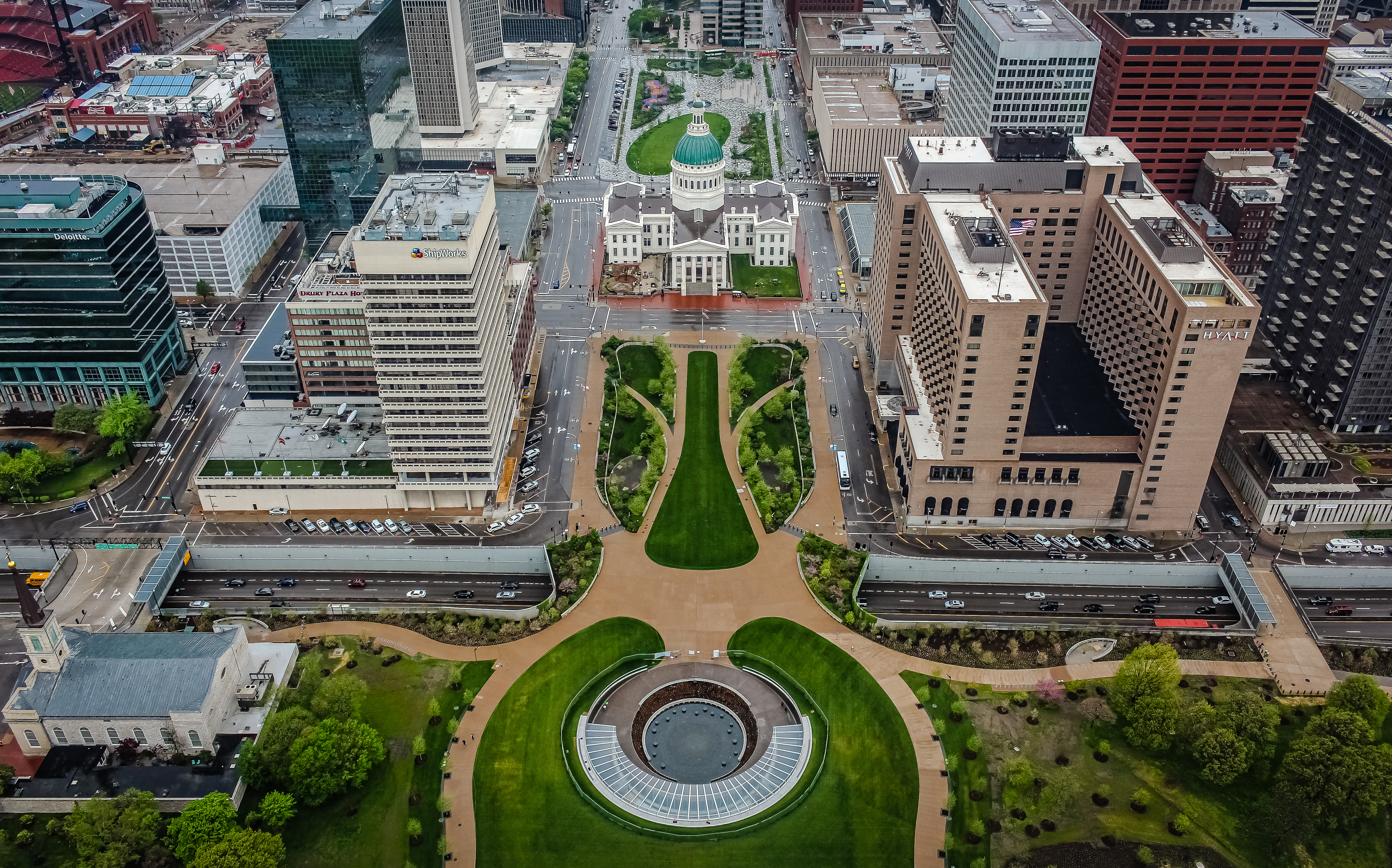
- The eastern end of the Mall seen from the top of the Gateway Arch in 2018

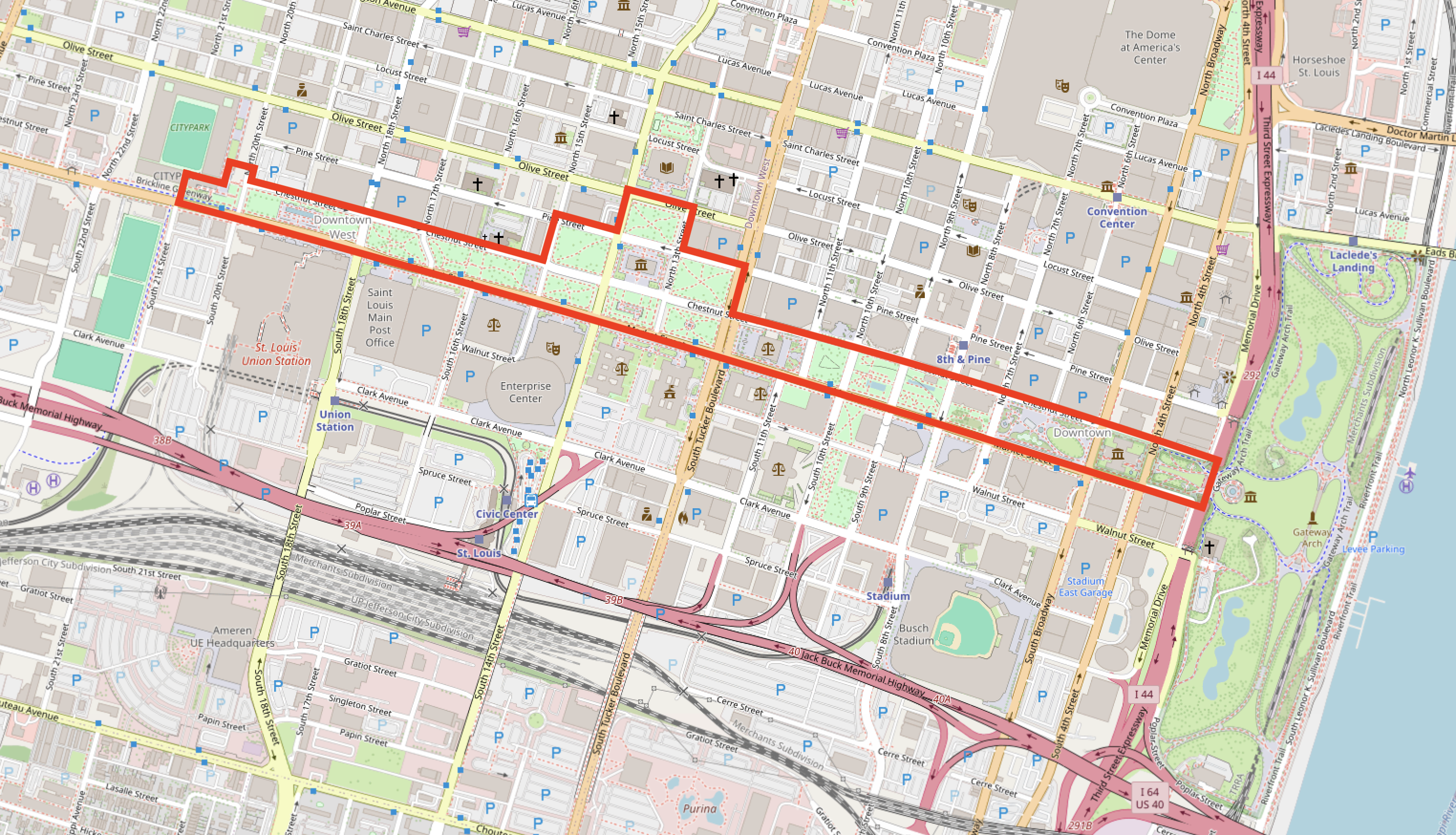
- Gateway Mall location in downtown St. Louis
- Type: Civic center, sculpture garden, urban park, war memorial
- Location: St. Louis, Missouri
- Coordinates: 38°37′41″N 90°11′57″W
- Area: 22 acres (8.9 ha)
- Opened: 1932 (Aloe Plaza, Memorial Plaza); 1938 (Soldiers Memorial); 1939 (Luther Ely Smith Square); 1960 (Memorial Plaza Extension); 1965 (East Kiener Plaza); 1981 (Twain); 1986 (West Kiener Plaza); 2009 (Citygarden); 2022 (Energizer Park)
- Owner: City of St. Louis
- Operator: City of St. Louis; Gateway Foundation; National Park Service
- Parking: Street parking
- Public transit: MetroBus; Red Blue; At 8th & Pine, Civic Center, Union Station

The Gateway Mall in St. Louis, Missouri is an open green space running linearly, one block wide, from the Gateway Arch at Memorial Drive to Union Station at 20th Street. Located in the city's downtown, it runs between Market Street and Chestnut Street.

== History ==
=== Early history ===
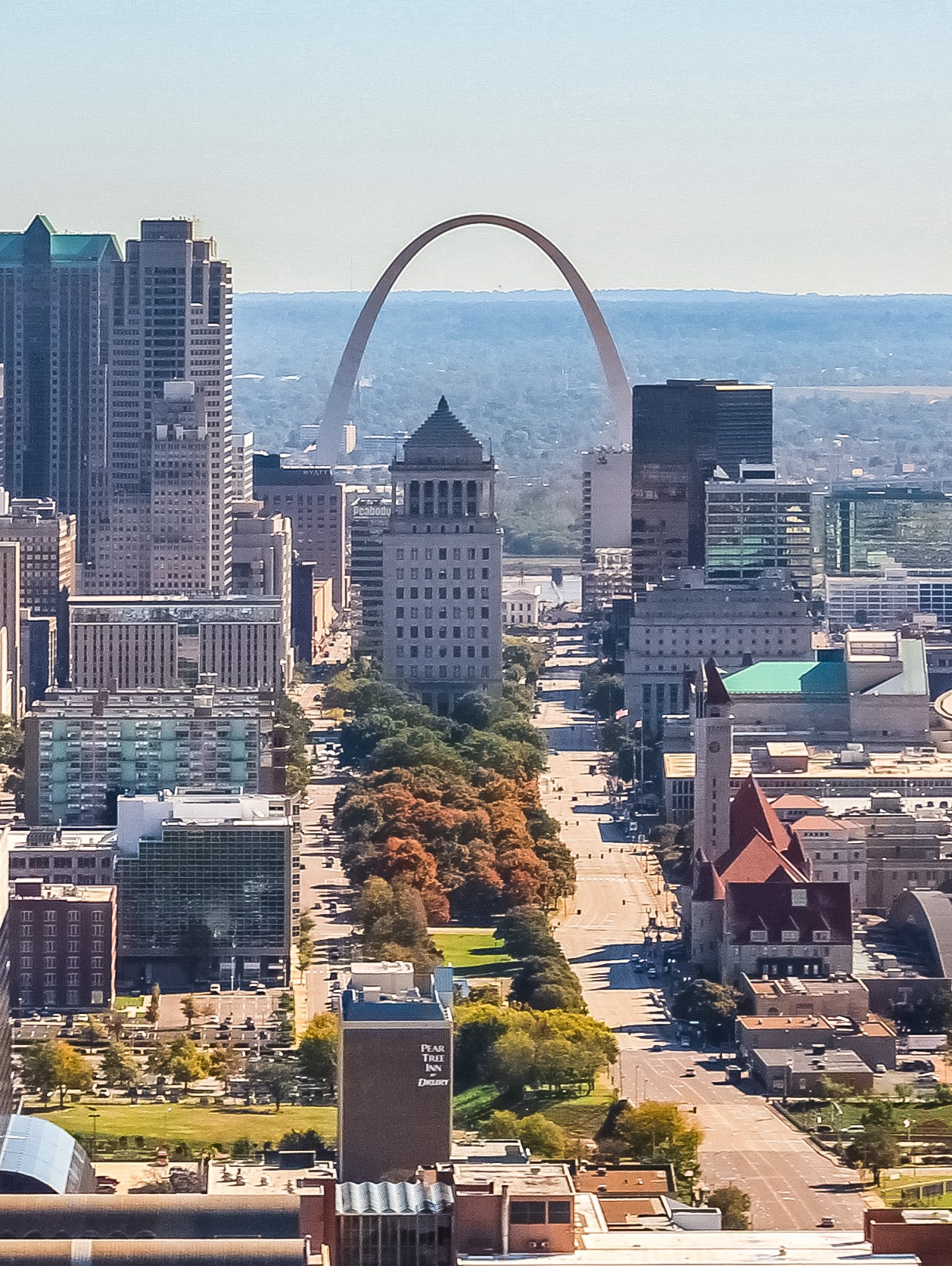
A view of the Gateway Mall looking east from Midtown

The Mall began as part of the Comprehensive Plan of 1907, which embraced City Beautiful principles held by members of the City Plan Commission. That plan originally called for the removal of buildings between 13th and 14th streets from Clark north to Olive streets to form a new park mall. This did not take place, and different players pushed the similar Central Traffic-Parkway plan in 1912. This intended to clear buildings between Tucker and Jefferson in a one-block-wide trip between Market and Chestnut streets. A later phase of the project would have extended the mall as far as Grand Avenue. It had the support of Mayor Henry Kiel, but in a 1915 referendum on the plan, voters defeated it.

The City Plan Commission published another downtown plan in 1919. The Public Building Plan called for the clearing of buildings for a park space between 12th and 14th streets. The first section between 12th and 13th would extend from Market north to Olive by the Central Library. The second, between 13th and 14th, would be between Market and Chestnut. This was approved by voters in 1923 with an $87 million bond to support acquisition and demolition of properties for certain spaces.

In 1939, as part of the Gateway Arch National Park (then known as the Jefferson National Expansion Memorial), a park was built with the aid of federal funds during the Great Depression between 3rd and 4th streets between Market and Chestnut.

In 1940, the city commissioned Carl Milles to design a fountain, The Meeting of the Waters, on Aloe Plaza in front of Union Station.

In the 1950s, city leaders completed the park blocks between 15th and 18th streets.

In 1965, voters approved a $2 million bond issue to build Kiener Plaza on the block between Broadway and 6th street. In 1966, voters defeated a demolition plan to extend the mall to Kiener Plaza, but the city moved forward. It secured one block between 10th and 11th streets, demolished the buildings and developed the park space in 1976. It proved unpopular, and the block was redesignated as the site of Richard Serra’s sculpture Twain .

=== Pride Plan ===
In 1982, mayor Vincent Schoemehl announced a public-private partnership called the Pride Redevelopment Corporation. The Pride plan was to remove the remaining buildings in the mall and construct smaller five-story buildings on the northern halves of each block to anchor park spaces on the southern halves. Three large historic office buildings, the Title Guarantee, Buder and International buildings, were pulled down by the end of 1984. During the two years that followed, a group of smaller historic buildings, known as Real Estate Row, were demolished, although all had been designated by the National Park Service as eligible for the National Register of Historic Places.

Only one half-block office building was constructed, the 15-story Gateway One. The building was criticized as demonstrating the very qualities it was created to replace. Its height obstructed the view of the Arch, which was supposed to be highlighted along the Mall. In addition, its mass made the section of the mall on its block seem private and inaccessible.

In 1992, Schoemehl promised to complete the Mall before he left office. In 1994, his administration cleared the two blocks between 8th and 10th streets for the mall, in the process removing the landmark Western Union Building.

=== Master Plan ===
A Master Plan was commissioned for the mall in 2007 by mayor Francis Slay. It defined the mall as a series of outside "rooms" and promoted design of a unifying "hallway" to run along the southern edge of the mall. Each room was to serve a function related to the buildings adjacent to it. Next to the Serra sculpture, a sculpture park was called for. Next to the Library, City Hall, and the Civil Courts Building, a civic room to hold public events was recommended. Next to the Plaza Square apartment complex, a neighborhood room with family facilities was needed. At the end by Union Station, planners recommended a feature that would indicate the end of the Mall, so a terminus section was designated. These rooms were intended to interact with each other and the buildings beside them.

Citygarden, the sculpture park "room," opened in 2009 to great acclaim. It was one of the rooms called for in the Mall's master plan. Following this, a conservancy group was formed to maintain the mall, help raise money for this purpose, and carry out the rest of the objectives of the master plan.

== Features ==
=== Luther Ely Smith Square ===
Luther Ely Smith Square

The Luther Ely Smith Square is controlled by the National Park Service, and is located directly between the Arch Grounds and the Old Courthouse. It is named after Luther Ely Smith, who organized the design competition for a landmark that resulted in selection of Saarinen's design for the Arch.

Memorial Drive, which runs along Interstate 70 between the Gateway Mall and the Gateway Arch, has often been cited by locals as having a pedestrian access problem. The current landscaping of the Smith Square, which focuses on symmetry, draws pedestrians to its edges away from its interior. It has been designated by the National Park Service as an orientation area. Under plans for renewal of the Arch area, the accessibility issue was corrected.

As winners of the 2009 international Framing a Modern Masterpiece design contest, Michael Van Valkenburgh Associates re-imagined Luther Ely Smith Square extending to form a park over Interstate 70, physically connecting the Arch grounds to the city of St. Louis for the first time. In November 2015, this plan was brought to fruition with completion of the first component of the CityArchRiver project.

To the north is the Hyatt Regency St. Louis Riverfront hotel. To the south are the Drury Plaza Hotel and KMOV-TV.

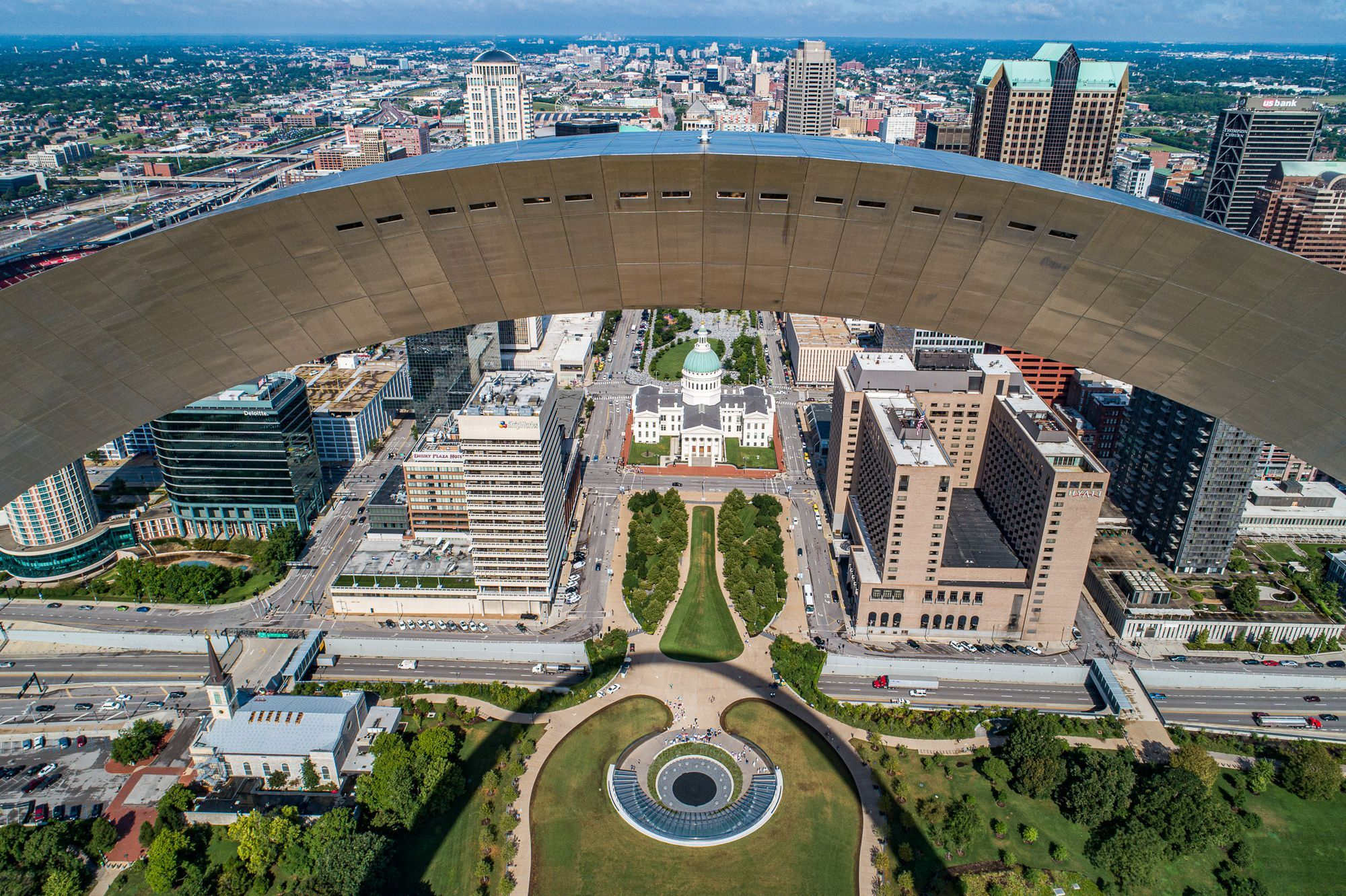
Luther Ely Smith Square seen from above the Arch

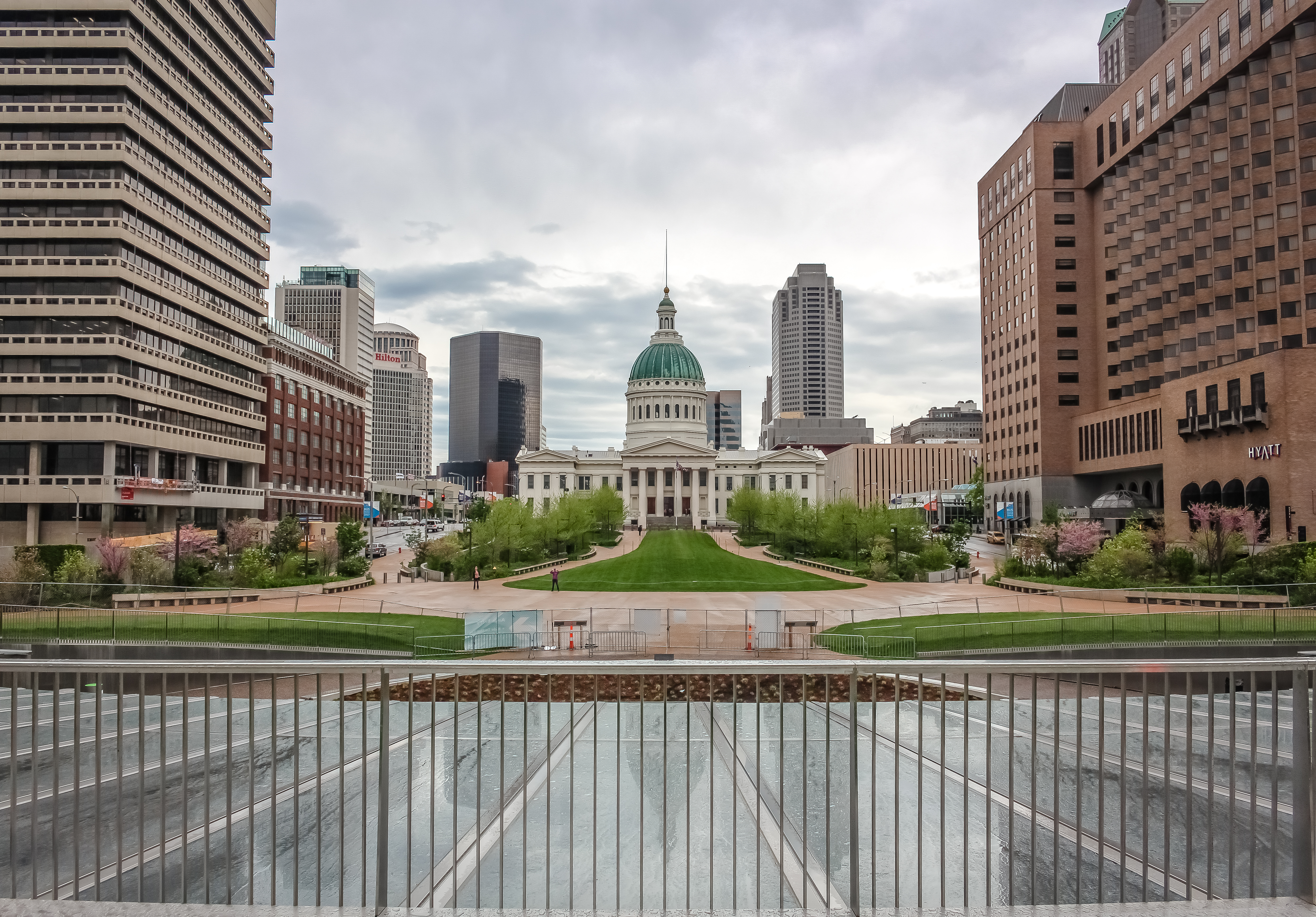
Then newly renovated Luther Ely Smith Square in 2018

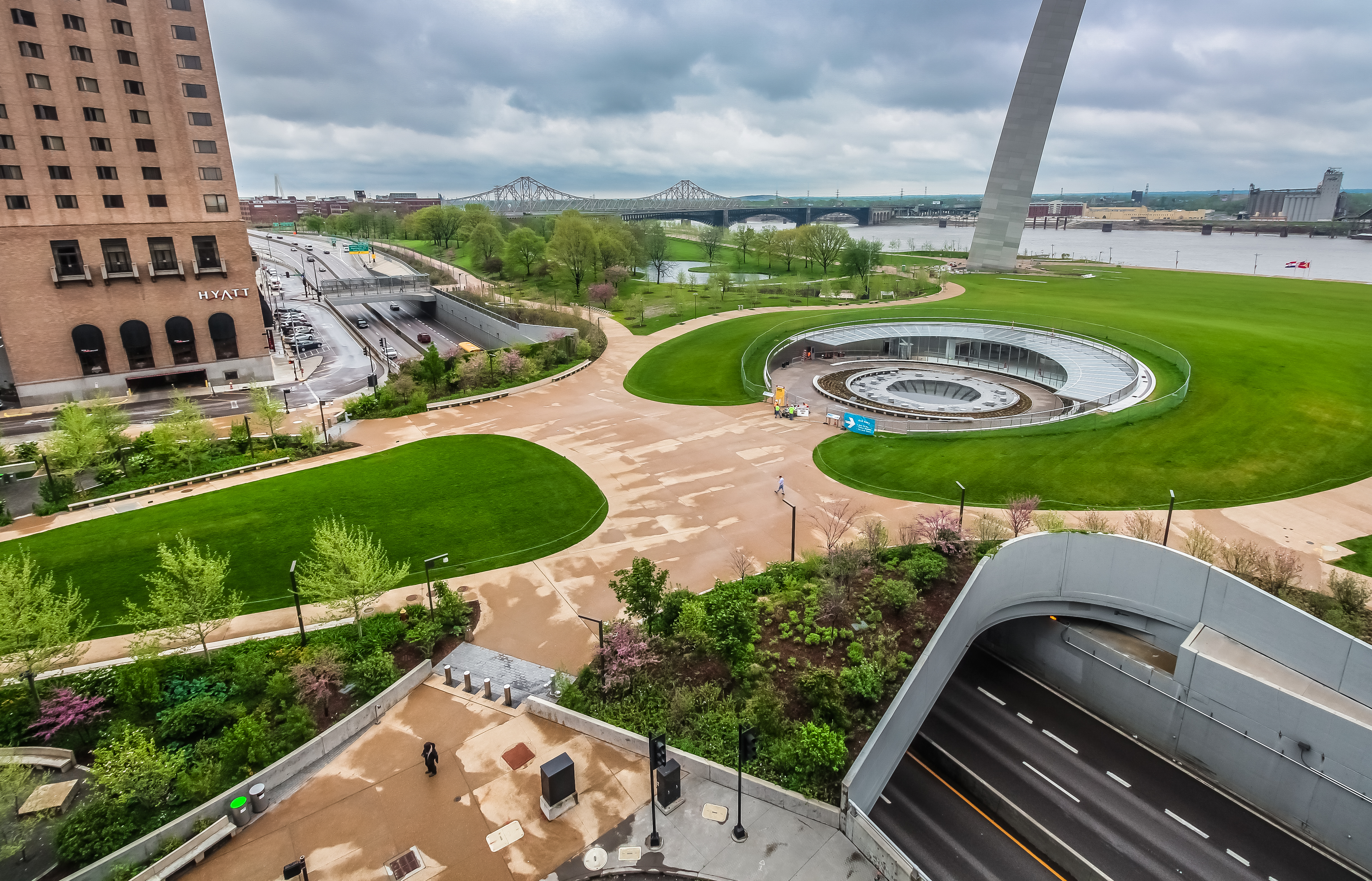
The Park over the Highway connecting Luther Ely Smith Square with the Arch Grounds

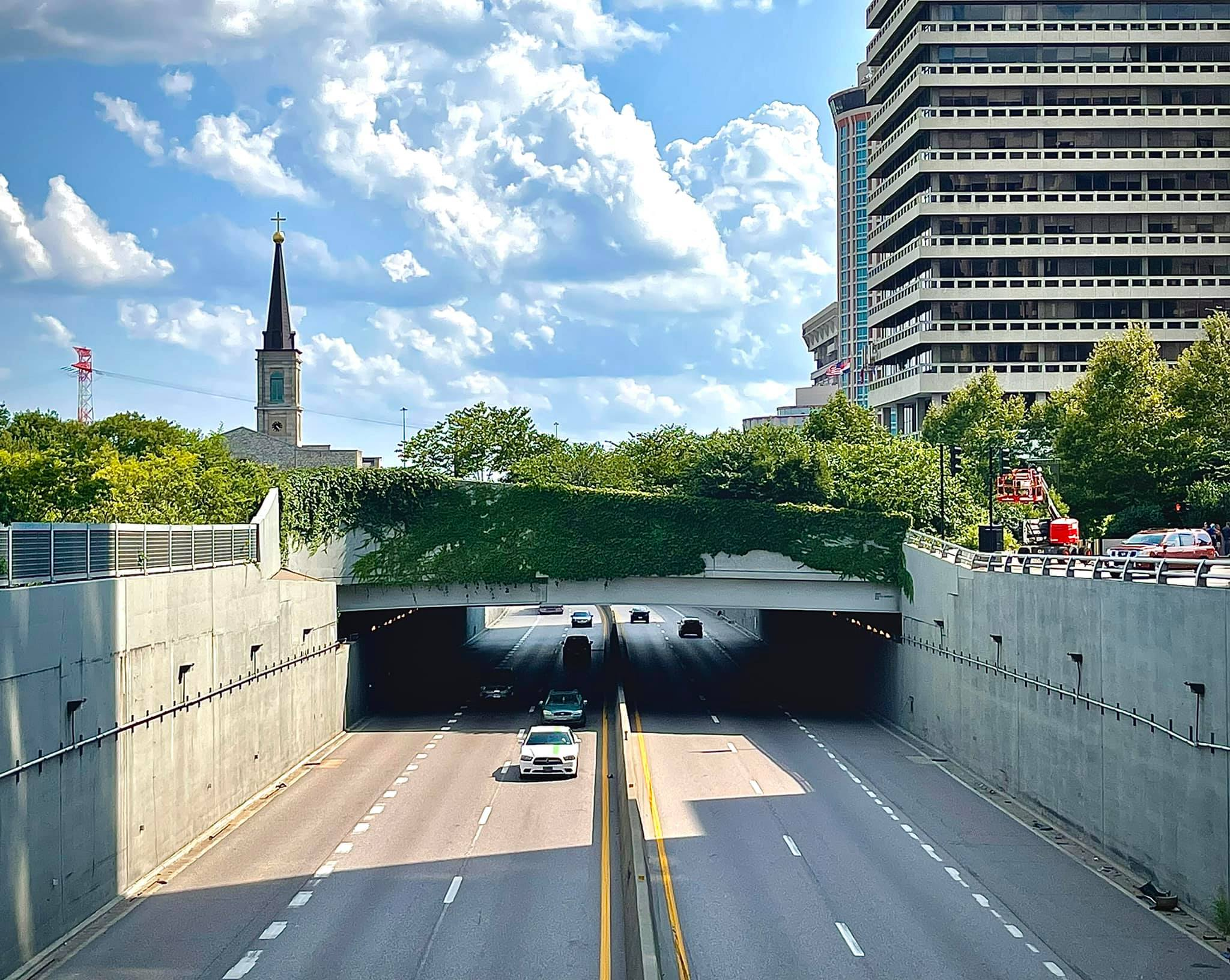
A side view of the Park over the Highway from Pine Street

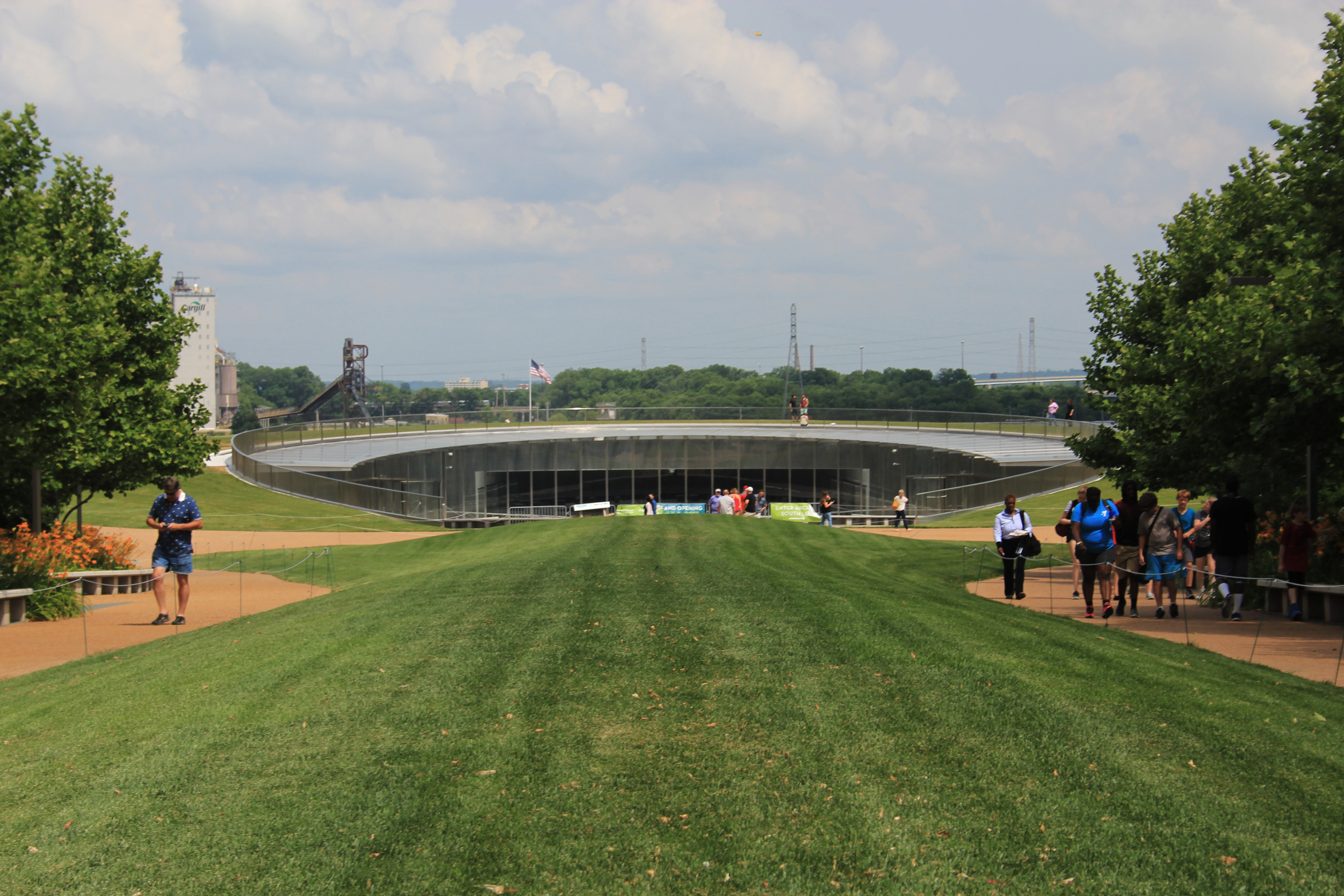
Luther Ely Smith Square looking east toward the new Arch entrance

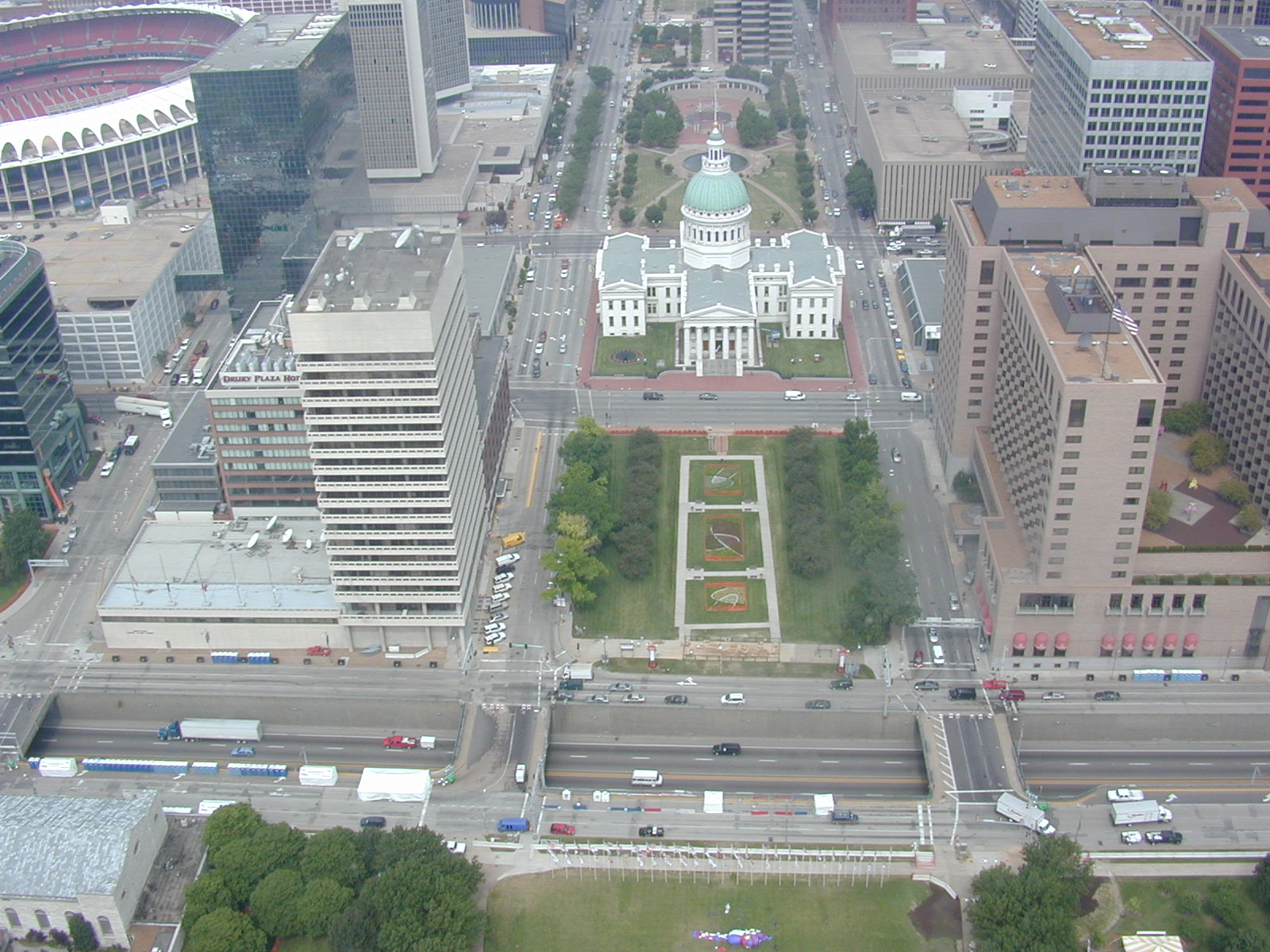
Luther Ely Smith seen from the Gateway Arch before renovations

=== Old Courthouse ===
Old Courthouse

The Old St. Louis County Courthouse was a combination federal and state courthouse in St. Louis, Missouri that was Missouri's tallest habitable building from 1864 to 1894.

Land for the courthouse was donated in 1816 by Judge John Baptiste Charles Lucas and St. Louis founder Auguste Chouteau. Lucas and Chouteau required the land be "used forever as the site on which the courthouse of the County of St. Louis should be erected." The Federal style courthouse was completed in 1828 and designed by the firm Laveille & Morton, which also designed the early buildings at Jefferson Barracks and the Old Cathedral. After Missouri became a state in 1821, St. Louis’ population tripled in 10 years. In 1839, ground was broken on a new courthouse designed by Henry Singleton in the Greek Revival style, with four wings, including an east wing that comprised the original courthouse and a three-story cupola dome at the center.

In 1851, Robert S. Mitchell began a redesign of the courthouse in which the east wing was torn down and replaced. From 1855 to 1858, the west wing was remodeled. The famous Dred Scott citizenship case was heard in the west wing before the remodeling. Beginning in 1861, William Rumbold replaced the cupola with an Italian Renaissance cast iron dome modeled on St. Peter's Basilica in Vatican City. The United States Capitol dome, built at the same time during the American Civil War, is also modeled on the basilica. 1861 was also the year of the final slave auction at the Old Courthouse. In 1864, the dome with its copper exterior was completed. Artist Karl Ferdinand Wimar was commissioned to paint four murals, which are featured in the rotunda.

The Old Courthouse had become city property when the city and county split during the "Great Divorce" in 1877. In 1923, city voters ratified an $87 million bond issue to fund new public buildings and a civic center according to the City Beautiful movement in downtown St. Louis including a new courthouse. The Civil Courts Building opened in 1930 and replaced the Old Courthouse as the city's main courthouse triggering a lawsuit by the descendants of Auguste Chouteau. One of the city's founders, Chouteau had donated land for the courthouse on the stipulation that it be used for court purposes in perpetuity. Since it was no longer being used for that purpose, his descendants unsuccessfully sued to regain control of the site.

In 1935, during the Great Depression, St. Louis voters approved a $7.5 million bond issue to raze nearly 40 blocks around the courthouse in the center of St. Louis for the Jefferson National Expansion Memorial. President Franklin D. Roosevelt declared in an Executive Order the area would be a national monument. The courthouse formally became part of the monument area in 1940 and remained the largest structure in the monument until the Gateway Arch was completed in 1965.

Due to its ownership by the National Park Service, the 2009 mall master plan didn't identify any improvements for the Old Courthouse aside from extending the "Hallway" through the block. In October 2023, a $27.5 million renovation began at the Old Courthouse including new exhibits, accessibility improvements, and mechanical upgrades. The building is expected to reopen in 2025 and is the final phase of the $380 million CityArchRiver project.

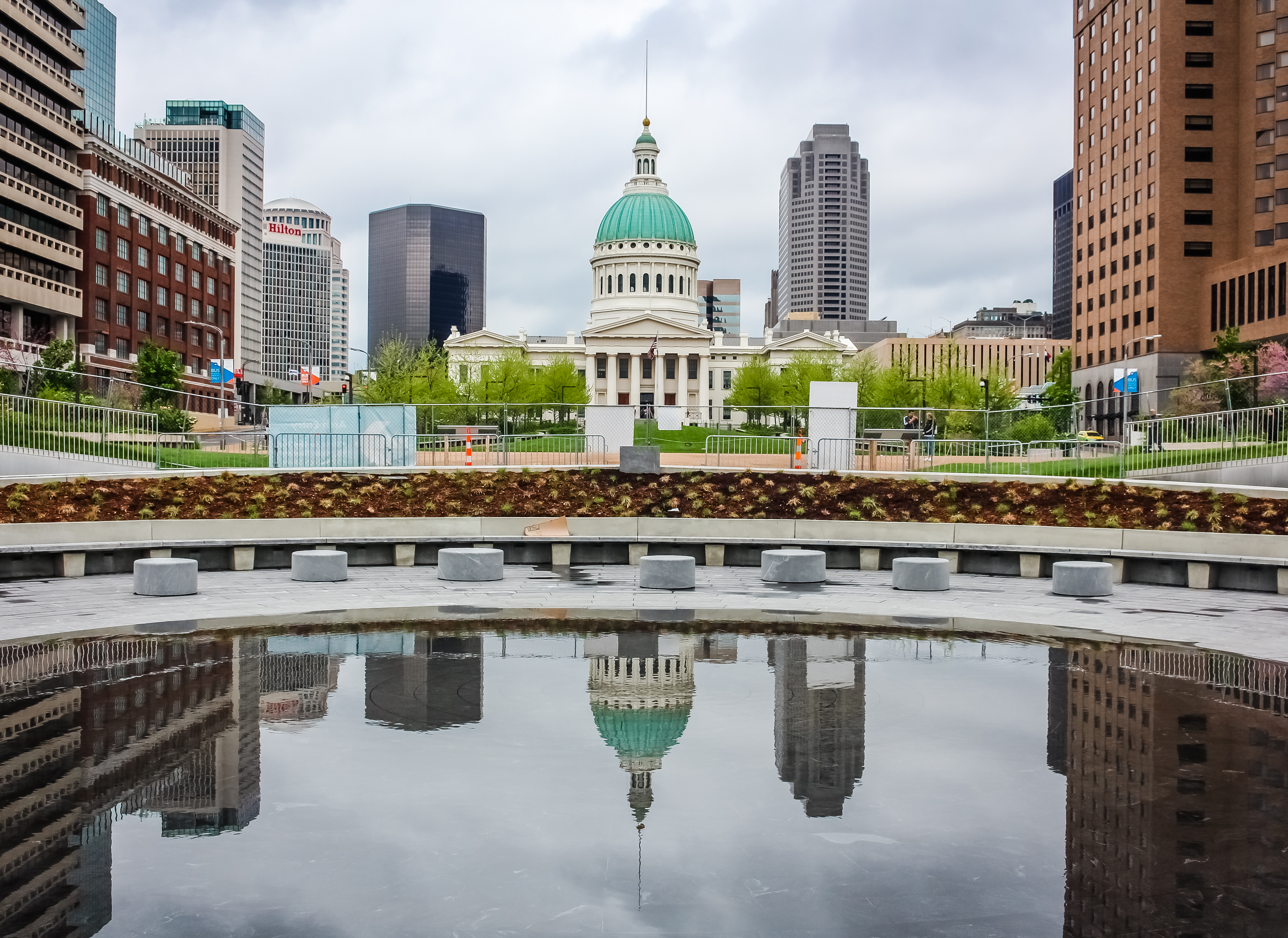
The Old Courthouse seen from the entrance to the Arch museum

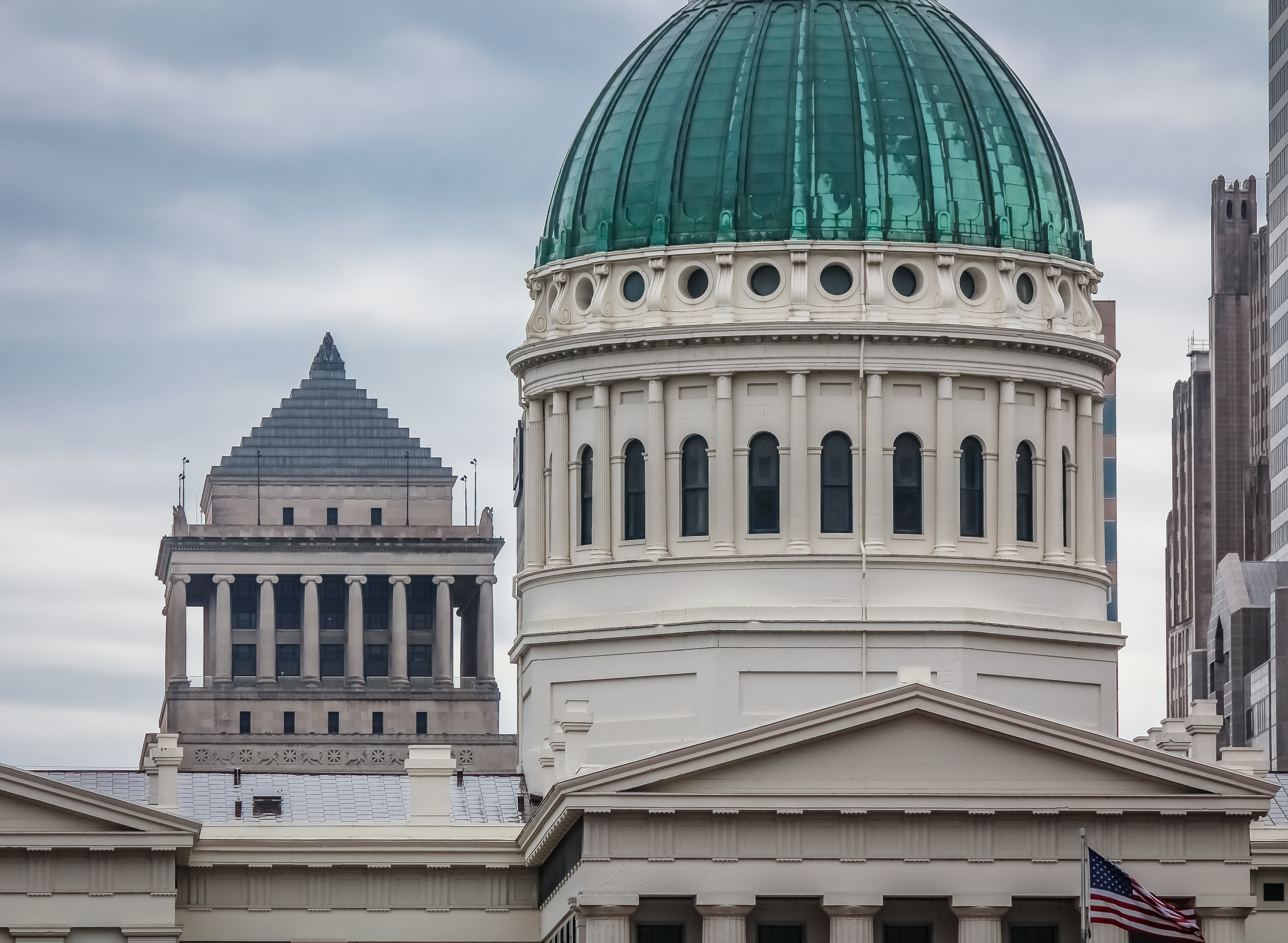
The rotunda of the Old Courthouse with the Civil Courts Building in the background

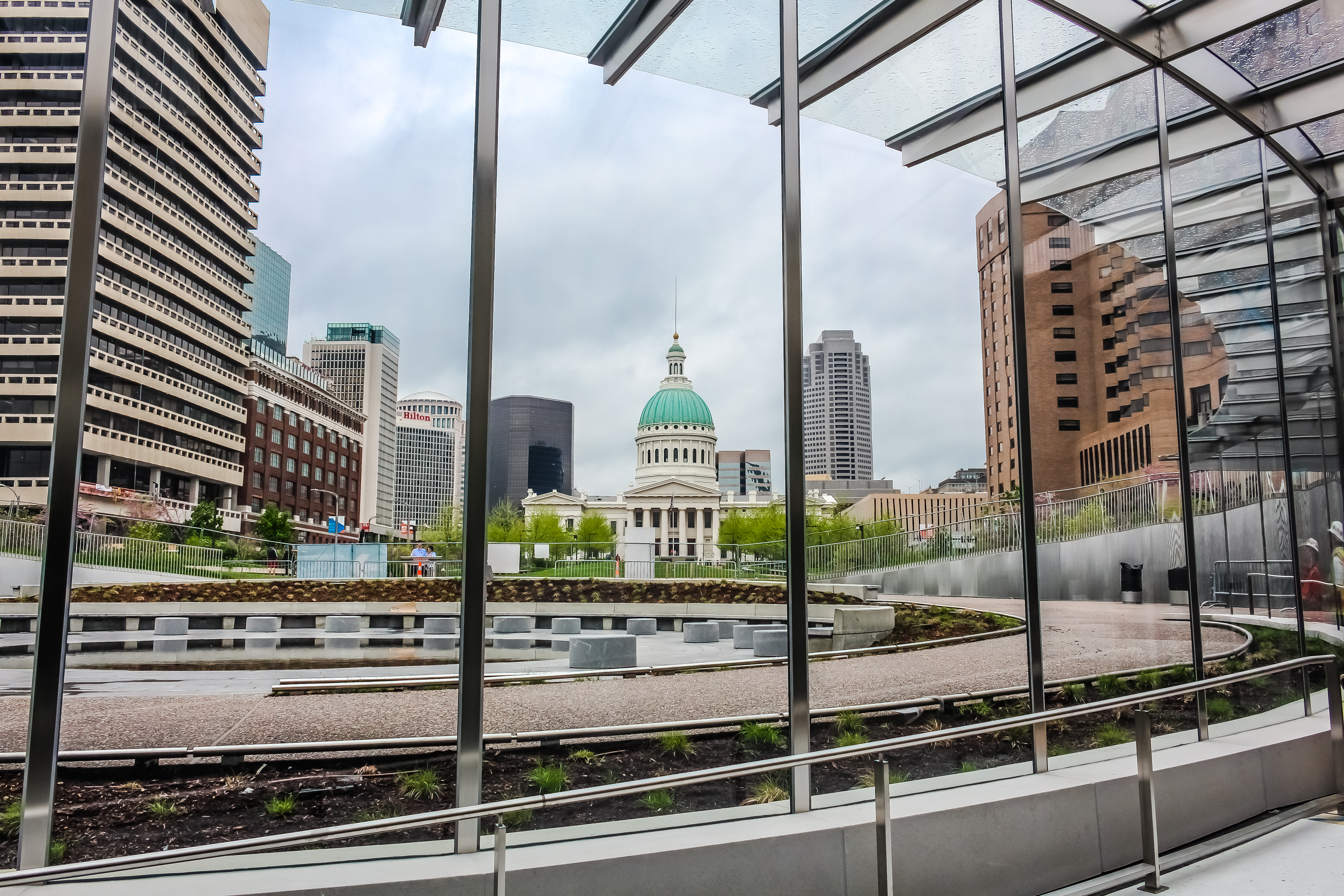
The Old Courthouse seen from the interior of the Arch museum entrance

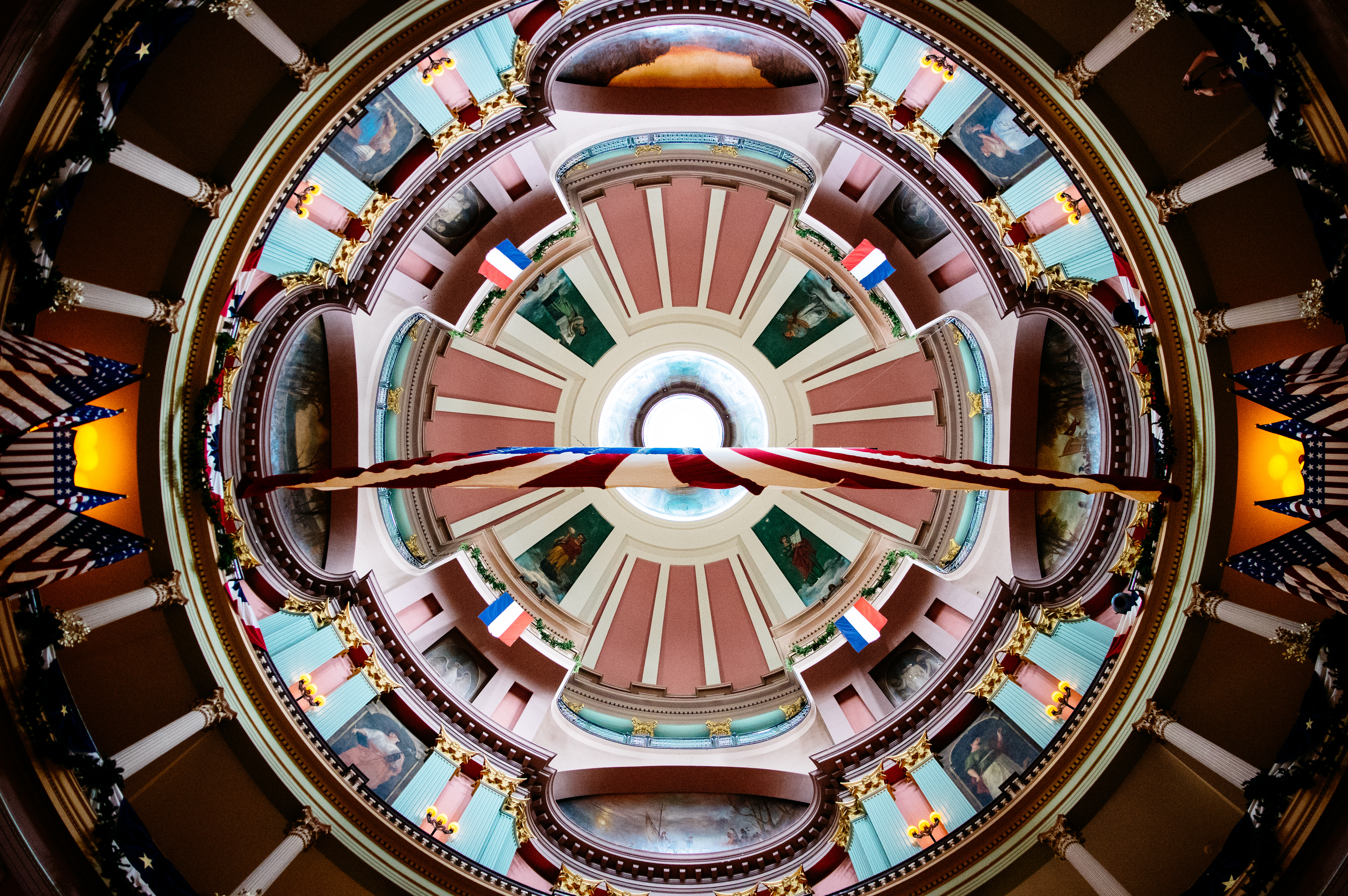
Old Courthouse dome

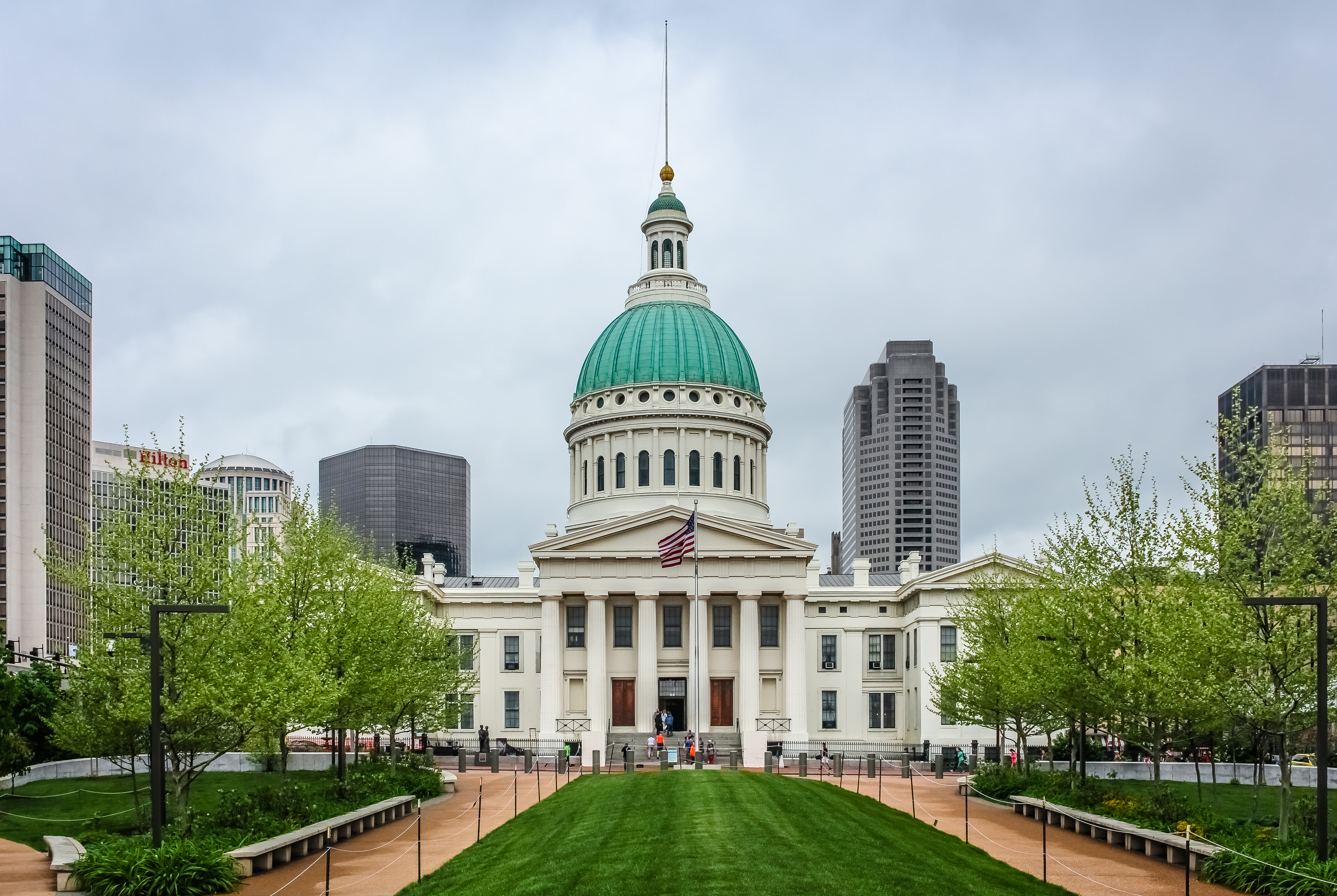
Old Courthouse from Luther Ely Smith Square

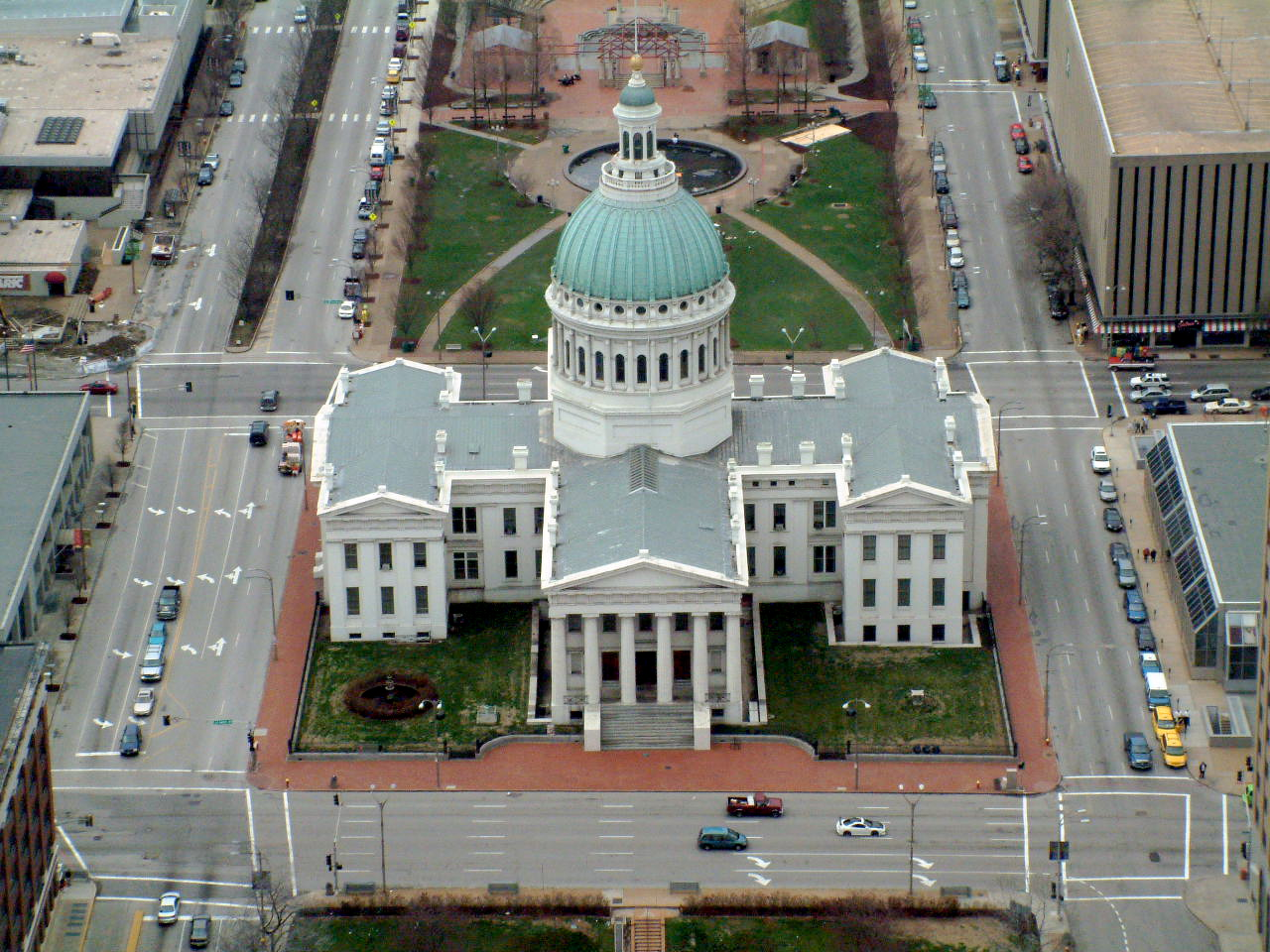
Old Courthouse before renovations

=== Kiener Plaza ===
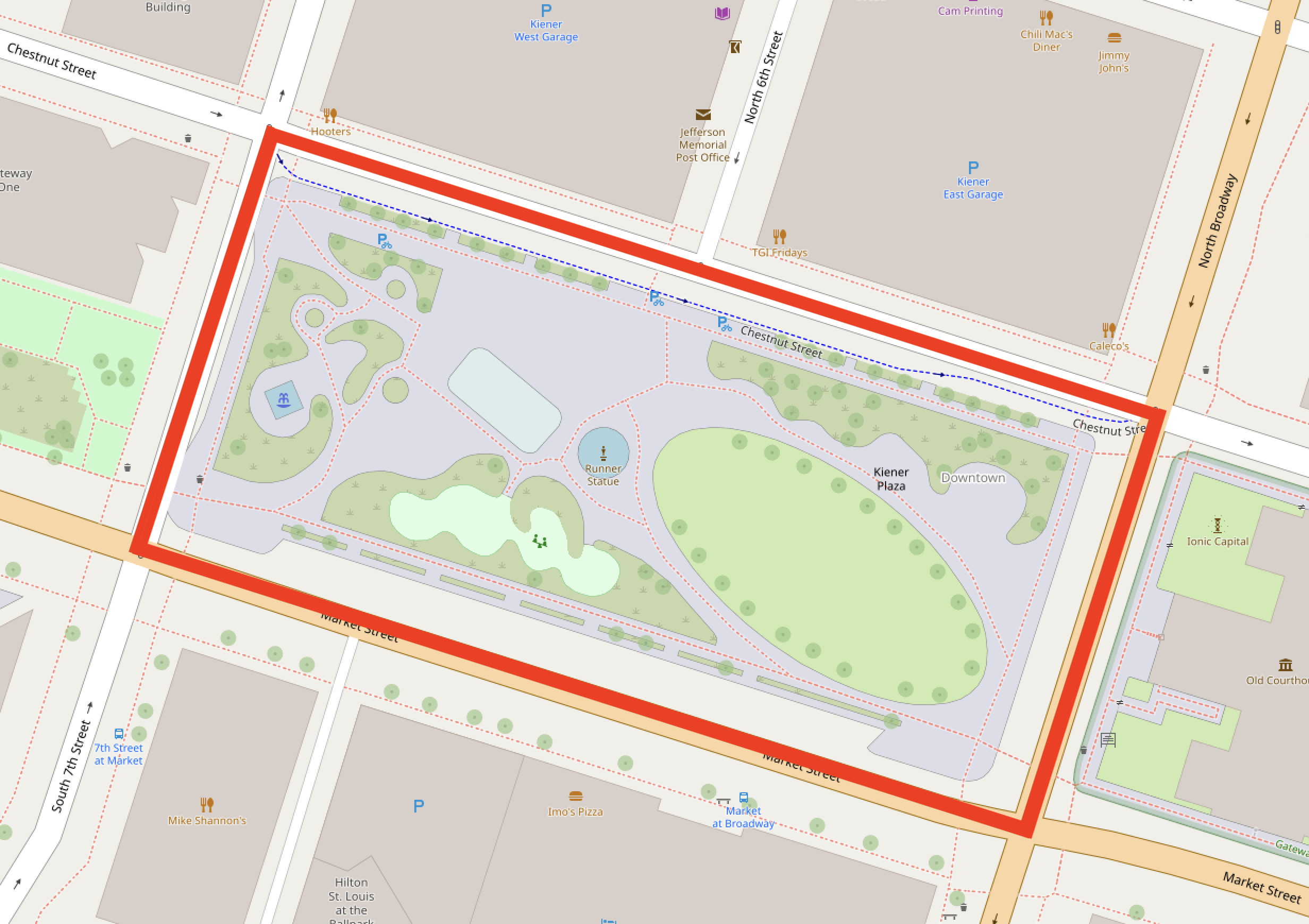
Kiener Plaza

Kiener Plaza was built in two halves across 21 years. After city voters passed a $2 million bond issue in 1962, the eastern half opened in 1965 between Broadway and 6th Street. This first section included a circular fountain with William Zorach’s sculpture, The Runner, placed in the center with the runner facing west. A $6.2 million bond issue to complete the Mall was rejected by voters in 1965 leaving the western half unfinished. In 1986, 6th Street was closed and Kiener Plaza was extended west with the Morton D. May Amphitheater, designed as a postmodern Roman ruin with a capacity for about 500 people.

After a real estate dispute in 1984, the city took ownership of 25% of the block with the remaining share owned by Southern Real Estate and Financial Company which leased it back to the city of St. Louis.

Improvements proposed in the 2009 master plan for Kiener Plaza included an event lawn, a performance pavilion and plaza, new lighting, and bringing the sunken portion of the park up to street level. Many of these improvents were carried out during the 2016-17 rebuild.

In February 2016, Kiener Plaza closed for a $23 million rebuild as part of the $380 million CityArchRiver project. It reopened on May 19, 2017, and saw the sunken amphitheater replaced with street level open spaces, a playground, a water feature, and a lawn that can accommodate up to 3,000 people. The Runner statue and fountain were moved to the center of the park with a new LED lighting system.

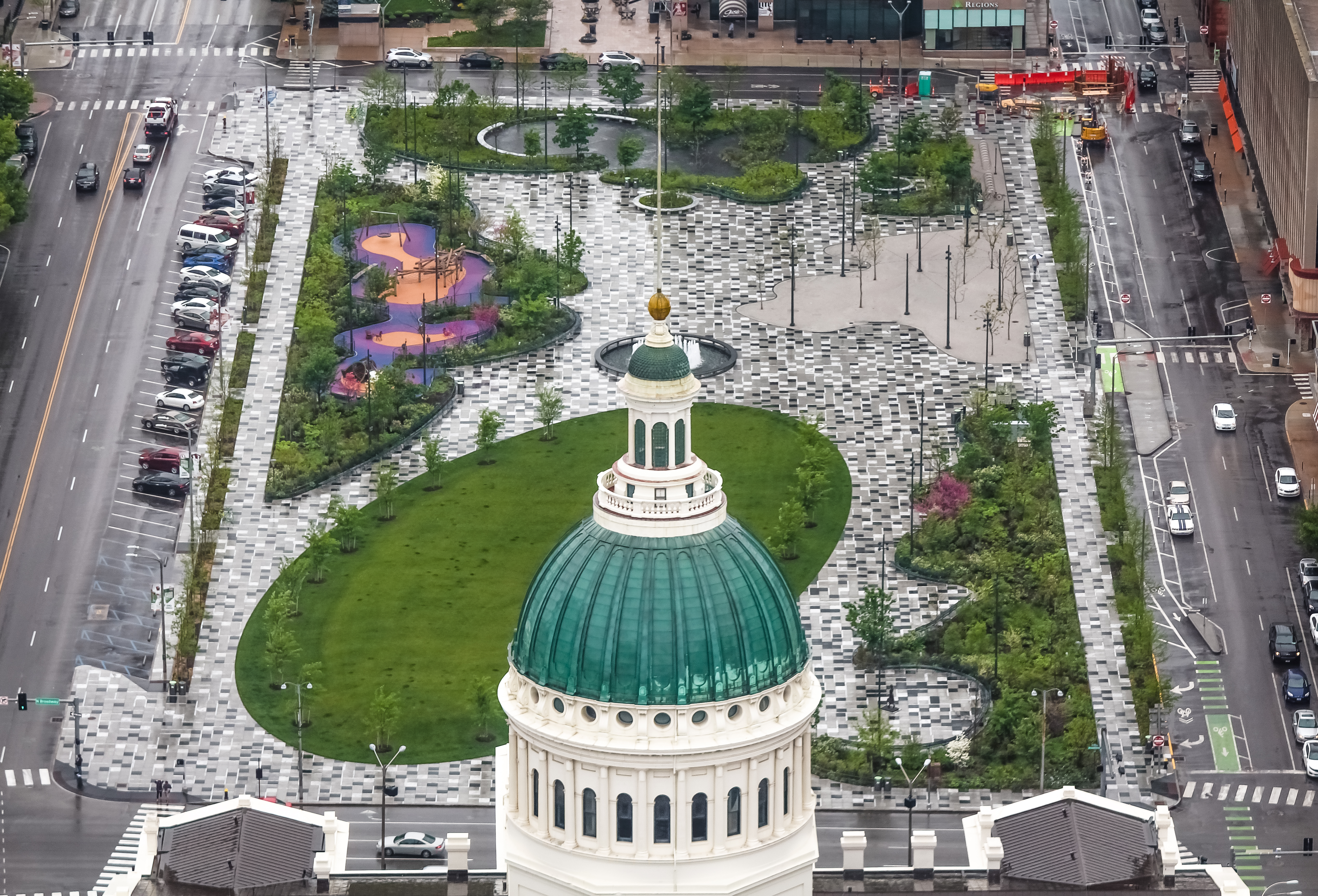
Newly rebuilt Kiener Plaza seen from the Arch in 2018

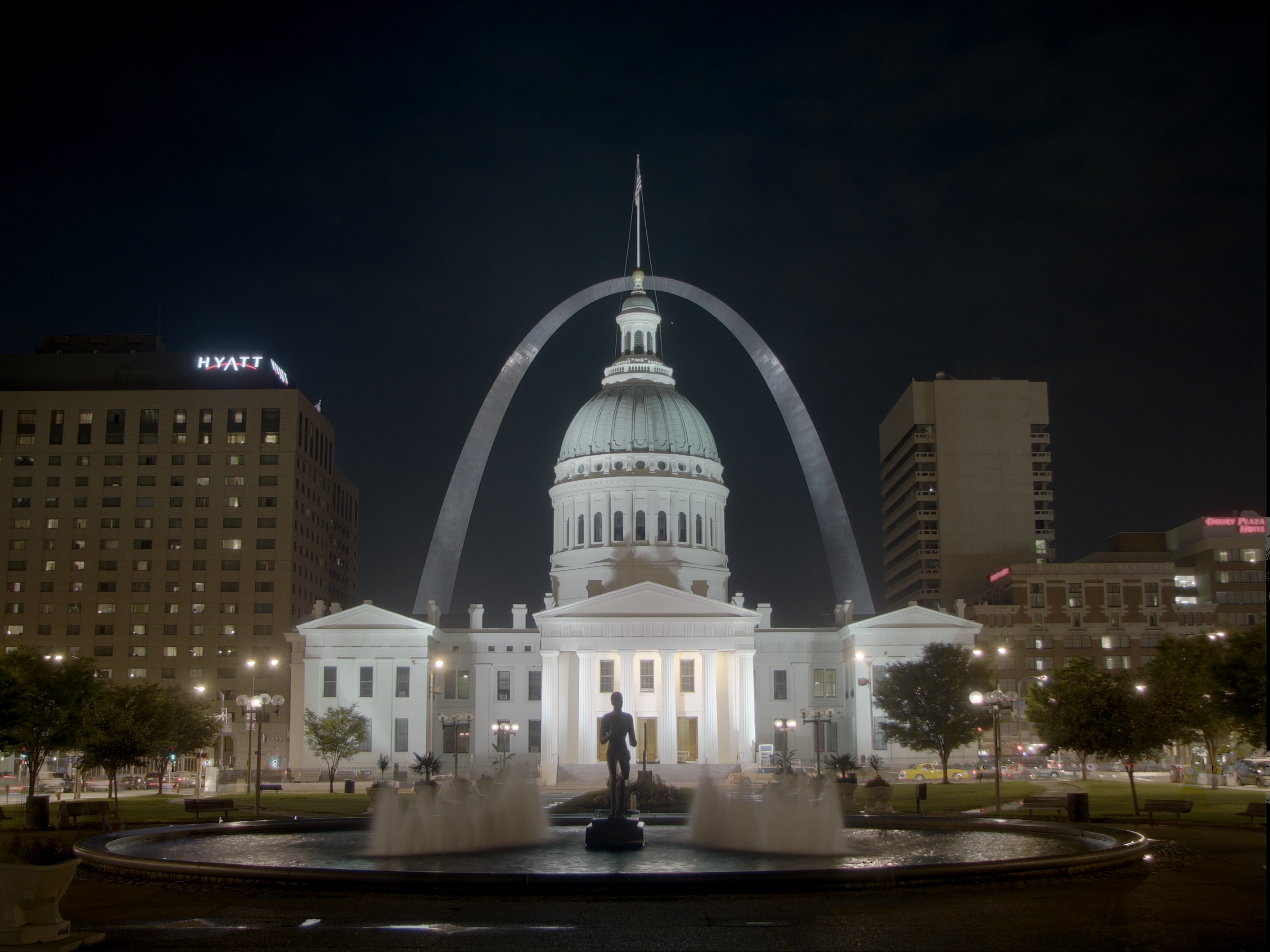
The Runner in Kiener Plaza before renovation

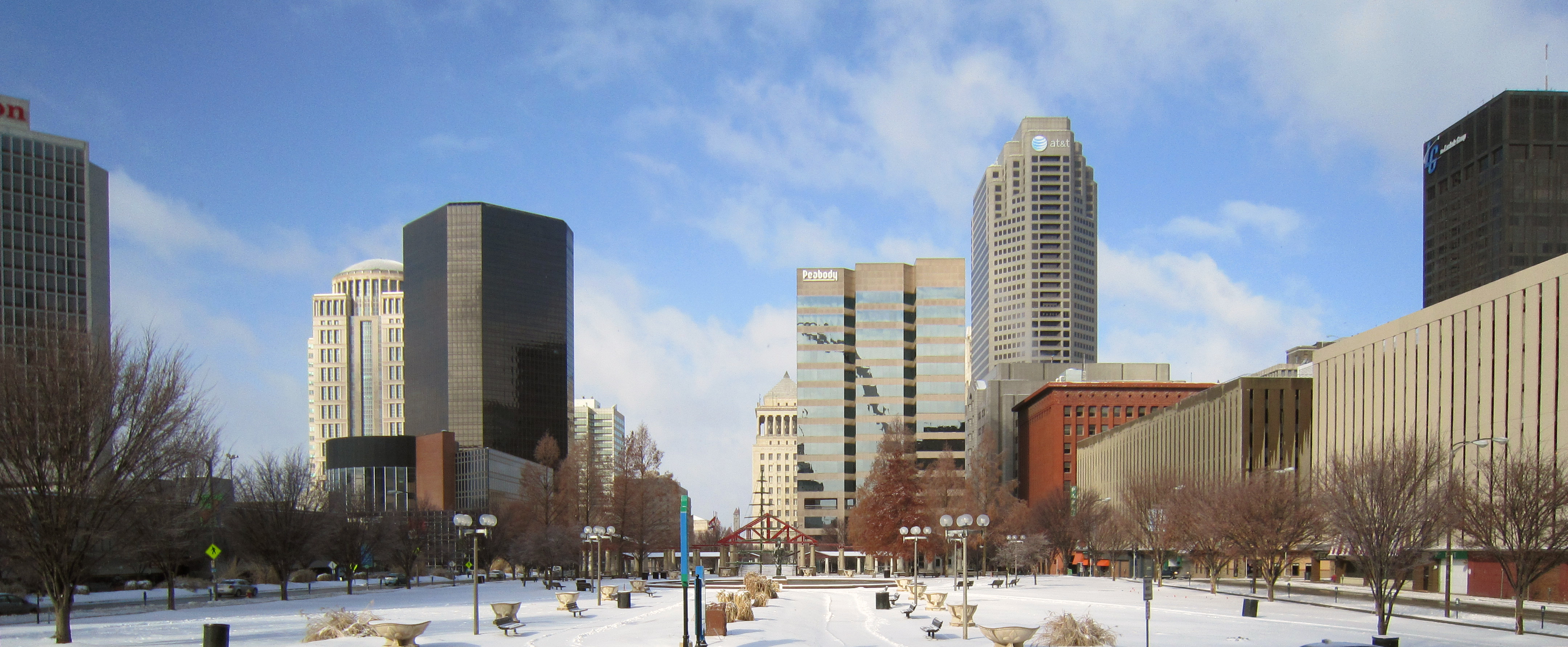
Kiener Plaza during the winter before reconstruction

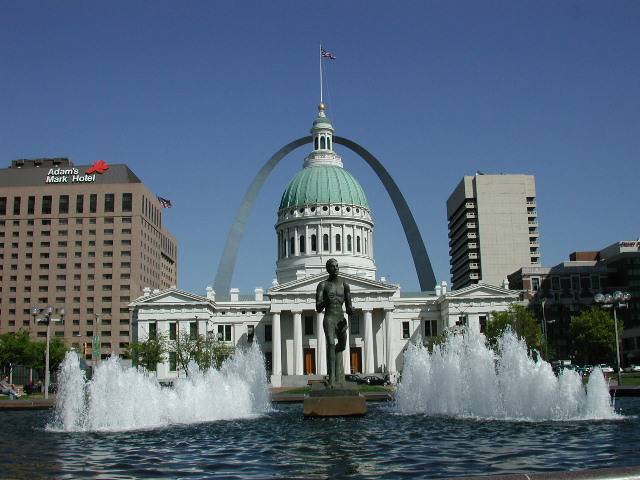
The Runner prior to relocation

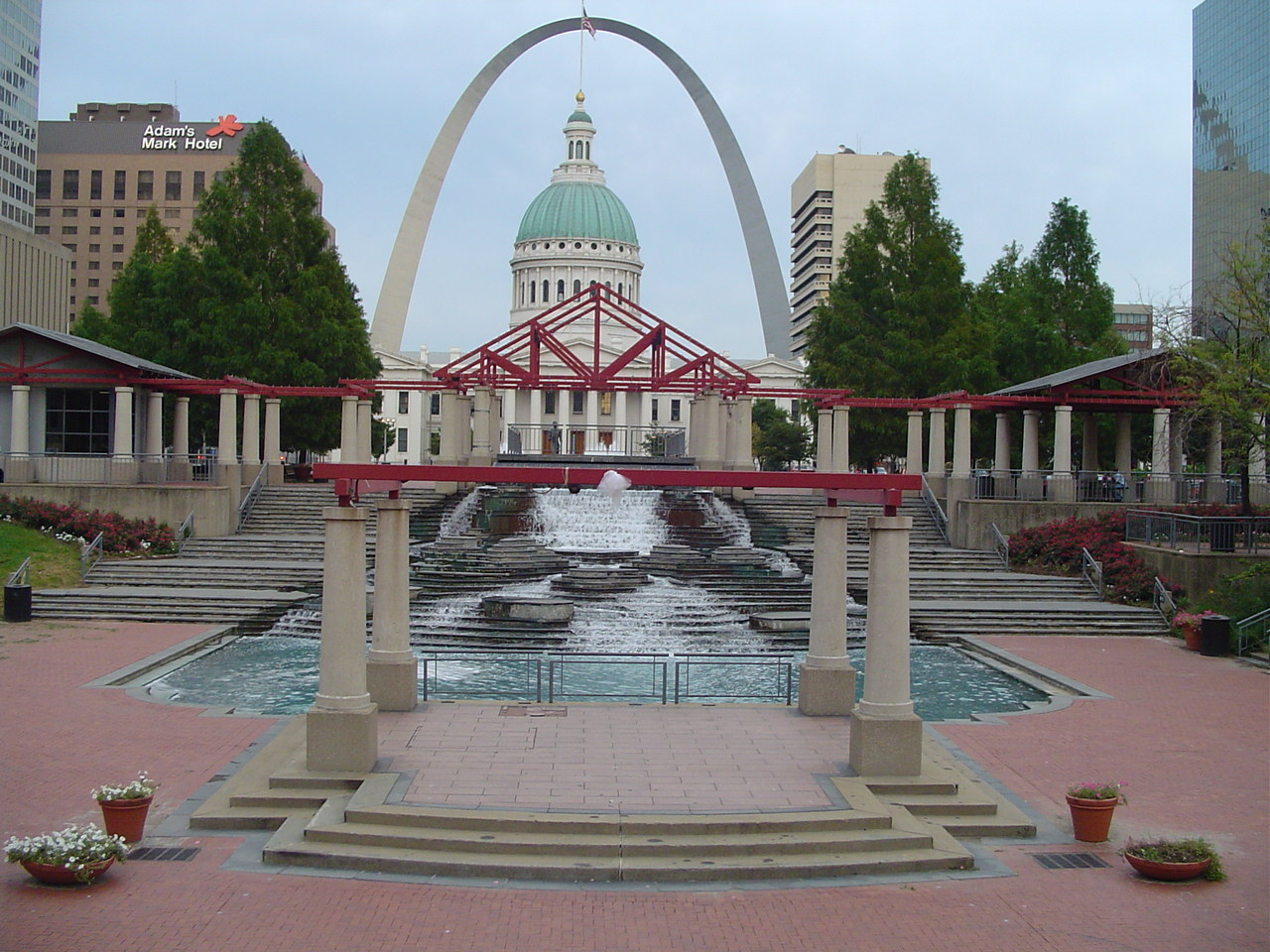
The former Morton D. May Amphitheater section of the Kiener Plaza before rebuild

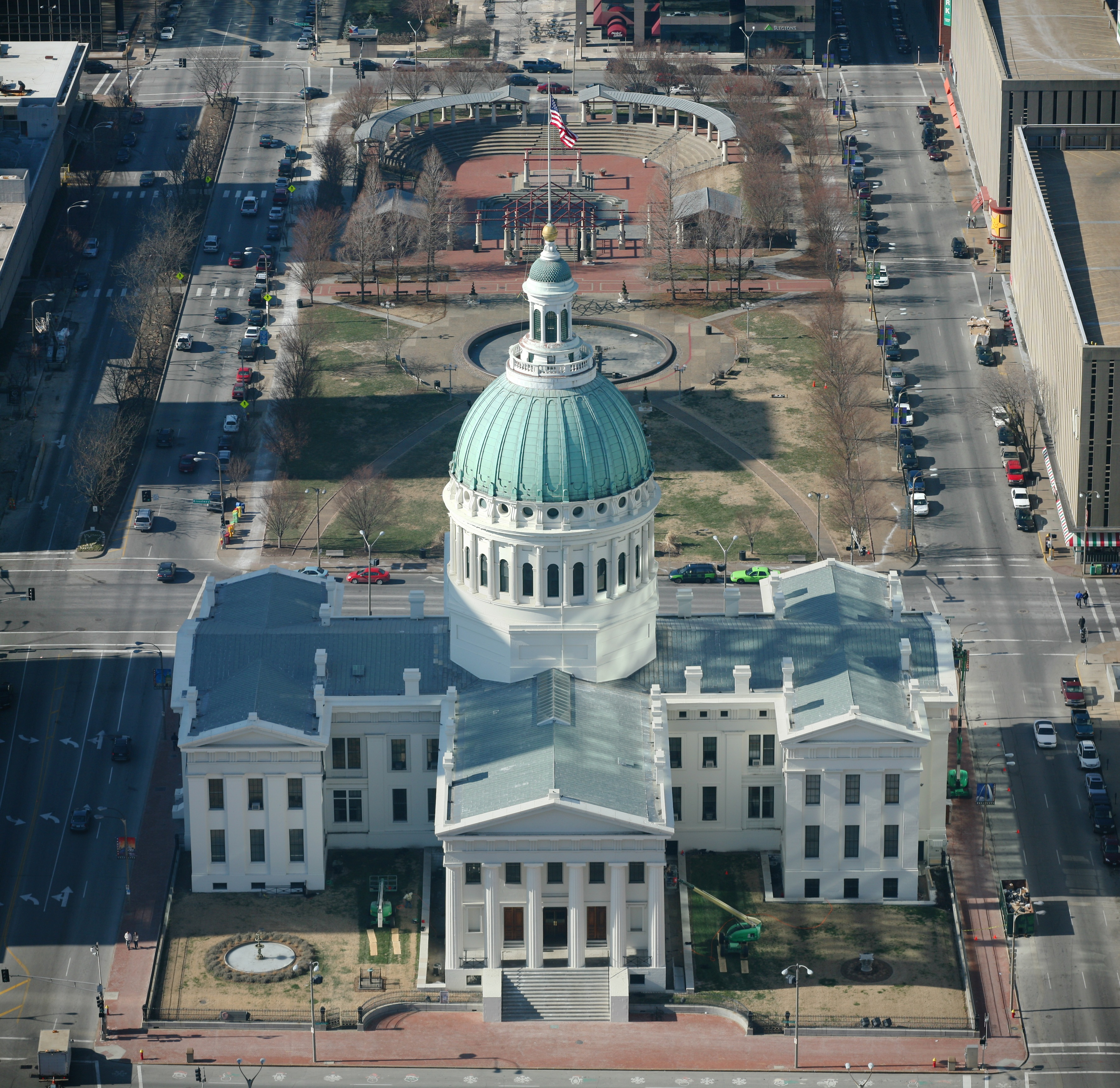
Kiener Plaza seen from the Arch before reconstruction

=== Peabody Plaza ===
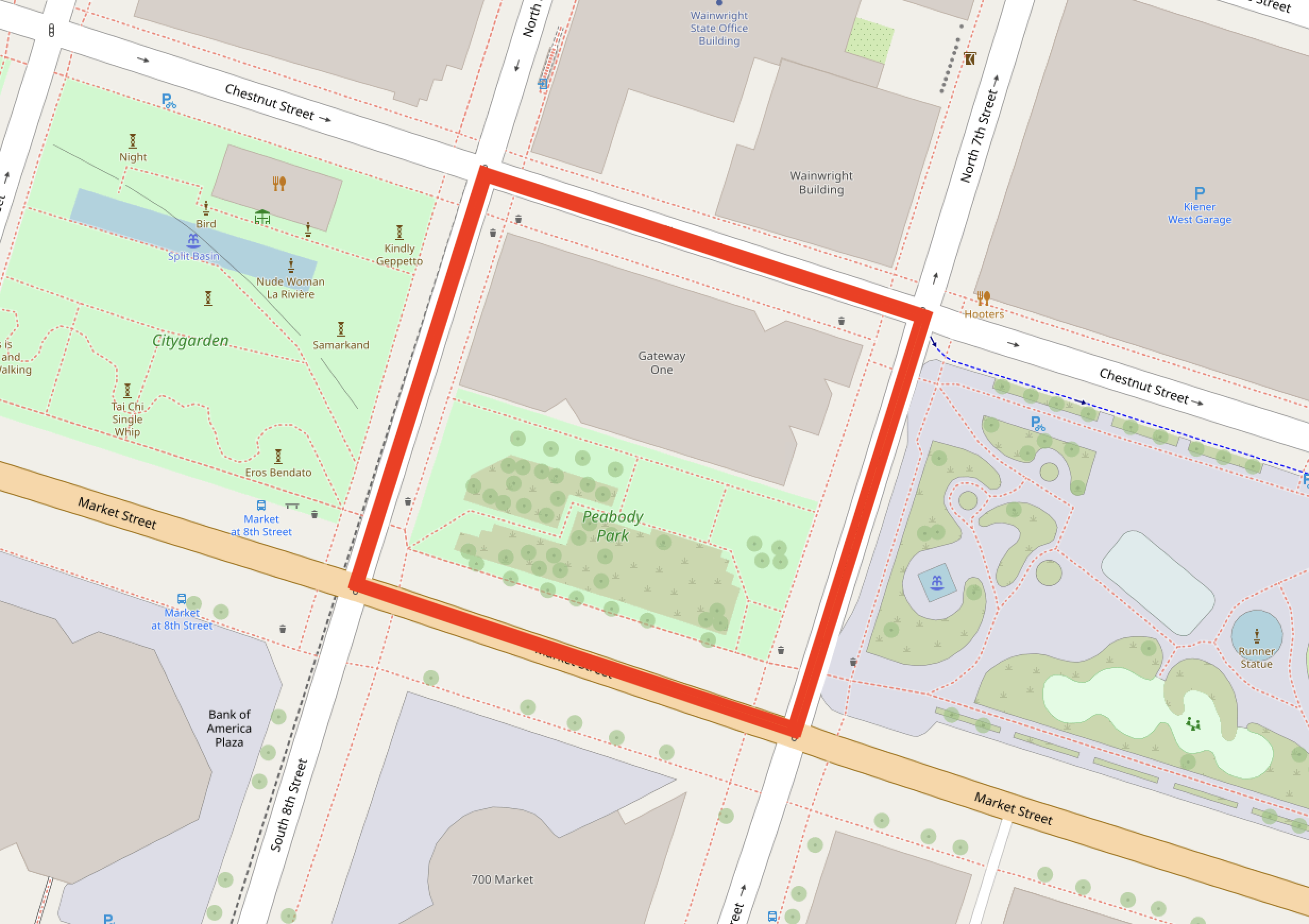
Peabody Plaza

Several proposals were considered for this block beginning with A Plan for Downtown St. Louis in 1960. This plan proposed formal park blocks with central lawns and tree plantings between 12th Street and the Arch Grounds. In 1977, developer Donn Lipton submitted a plan for this block that would have kept most of the historic buildings in place while turning the alley into park space.

In 1982, city leaders endorsed the Pride Plan, or "half mall" concept. This would have cleared the blocks between 6th and 10th streets and replaced the northern half with 5+ story buildings and the southern half with park space. This would lead to a two-year battle between preservationists and officials over the fate of three large historic buildings in the Mall's path: the Title Guaranty, Buder, and International buildings. Despite the Landmarks Association of St. Louis moving into the Title Guaranty building in an effort to save it, all three were demolished by the end of 1984. The Gateway One building was designed by Robert L. Boland and opened on the block between 7th and 8th streets in 1986.

The 2009 master plan only suggested bringing the building's outdoor plaza down to sidewalk level on Market Street and continuing the "Hallway" along the Mall.

Today the building is known as Peabody Plaza and is the headquarters of Peabody Energy. To the north of this block is the historic Wainwright Building designed by noted 20th-century architect Louis Sullivan.

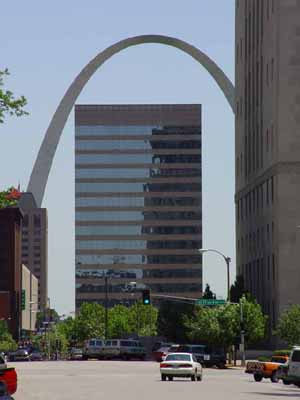
Peabody Plaza on the Gateway Mall

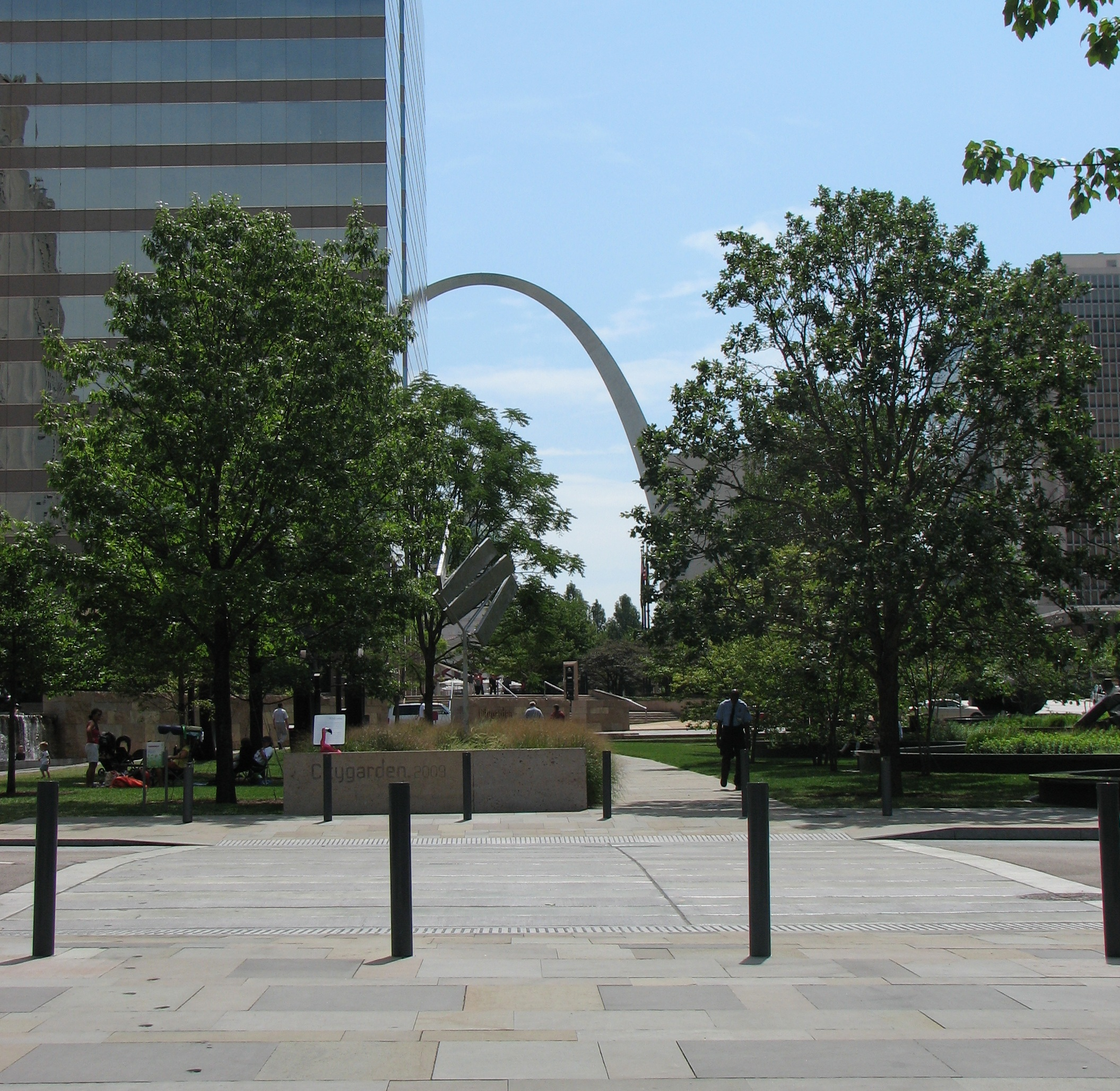
Peabody Plaza seen from Citygarden

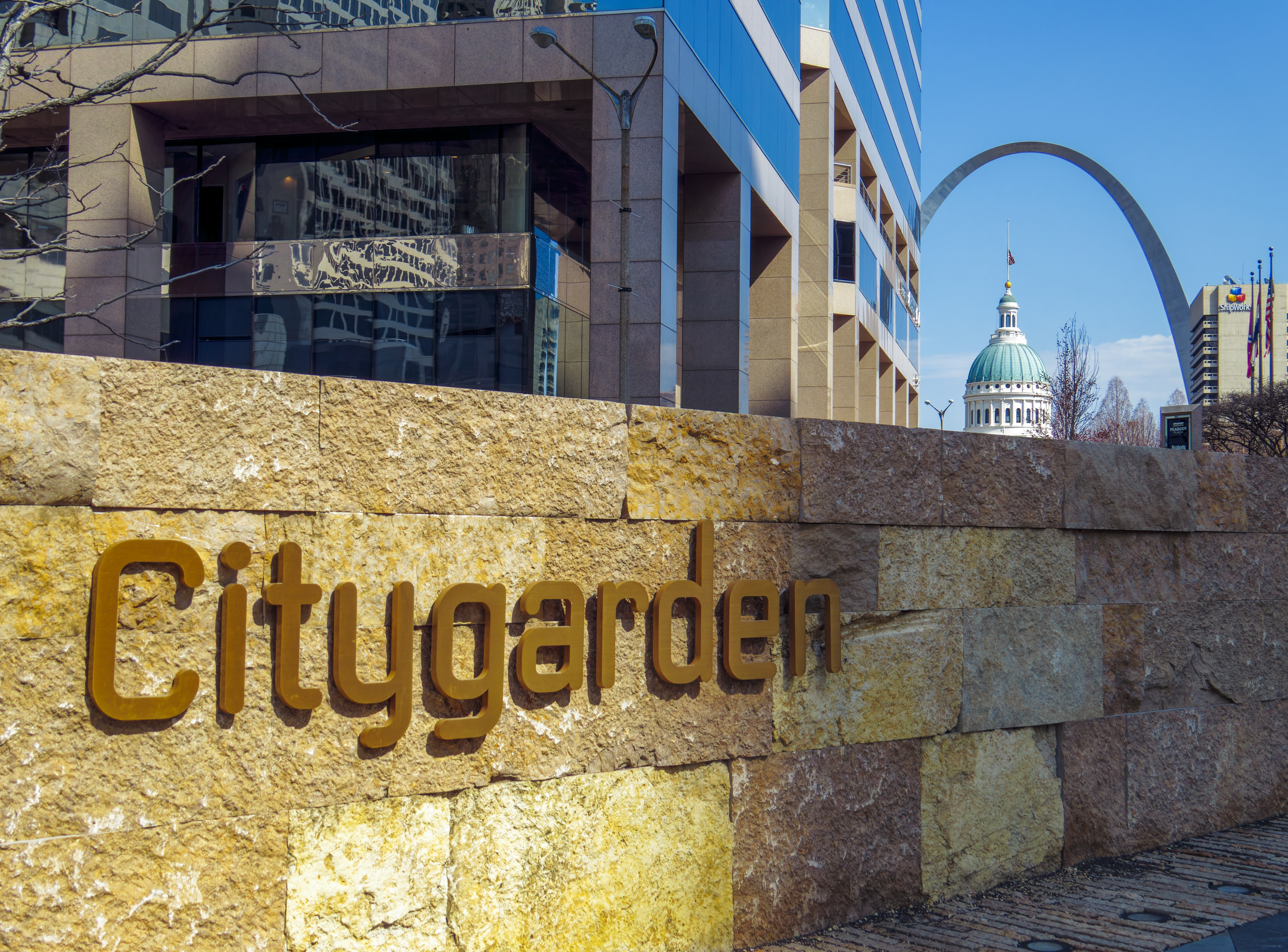
Peabody Plaza seen behind Citygarden entrance

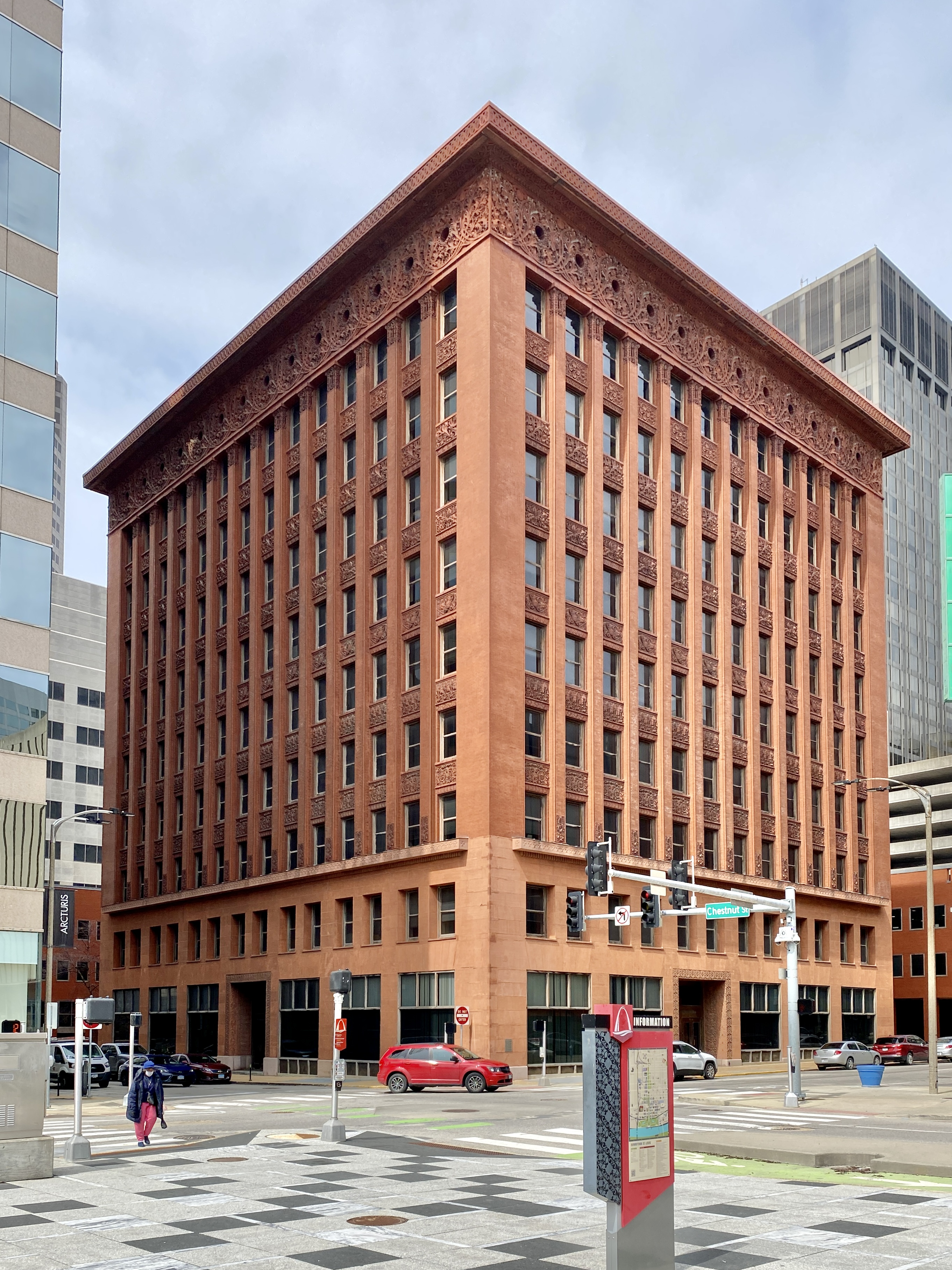
The Wainwright Building next to Peabody Plaza

=== Citygarden ===
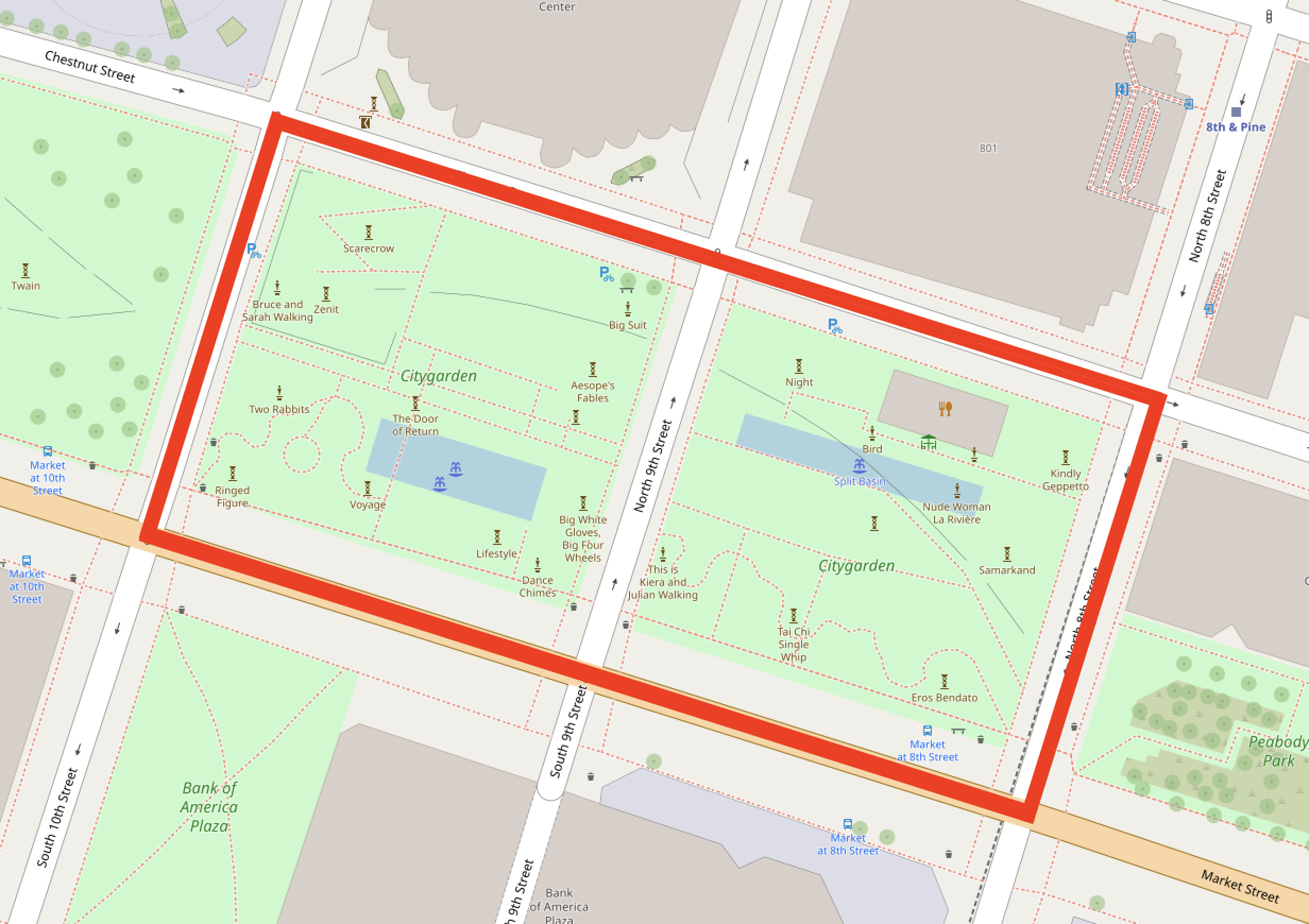
Citygarden

The blocks of today's Citygarden were targeted for renewal several times beginning in 1954. 1960's A Plan for Downtown St. Louis suggested creating formal park blocks east of 12th Street to the Arch Grounds with central lawns and uniform tree plantings. 9th Street would have been removed and replaced with a music hall. In 1977, developer Donn Lipton submitted a plan for the blocks between 7th and 10th streets that would have kept most of the historic buildings in place while turning the alleys into park space. In 1982, city leaders abandoned this plan in favor of the Pride Plan, or "half mall" concept. This would have cleared the blocks between 6th and 10th streets and replaced the northern half with 5+ story buildings and the southern half with park space. Only the Gateway One building would be completed before the rest of this plan was shelved by the city.

Finally in 1994, the two lightly landscaped blocks between 8th and 10th streets were opened, completing the Mall between the Arch and 20th Street.

The 2009 master plan identified the two blocks between 8th and 10th streets as the "Citygarden," an urban sculpture park with seating, plantings, temporary art installations and a restaurant called the Terrace View. This part of the master plan was realized when the Gateway Foundation opened the $30 million park on July 1, 2009. Some of the artists represented include: Donald Baechler, Niki de Saint Phalle, Jim Dine, Mark Di Suvero, Jean-Michel Folon, Laura Ford, Aristide Maillol, Ju Ming, Igor Mitoraj, Julian Opie, Tom Otterness, Mimmo Paladino, Martin Puryear, Bernar Venet, and Jack Youngerman.

In 2011, the Terrace View restaurant closed. After several attempts by others, local restaurant Burger 809 opened at the space in July 2024.

A small expansion of the park opened in May 2024 and fully closed 9th Street, extended the serpentine wall and added three new pieces of artwork. Today, the garden is home to 29 pieces of artwork placed across its three acres.

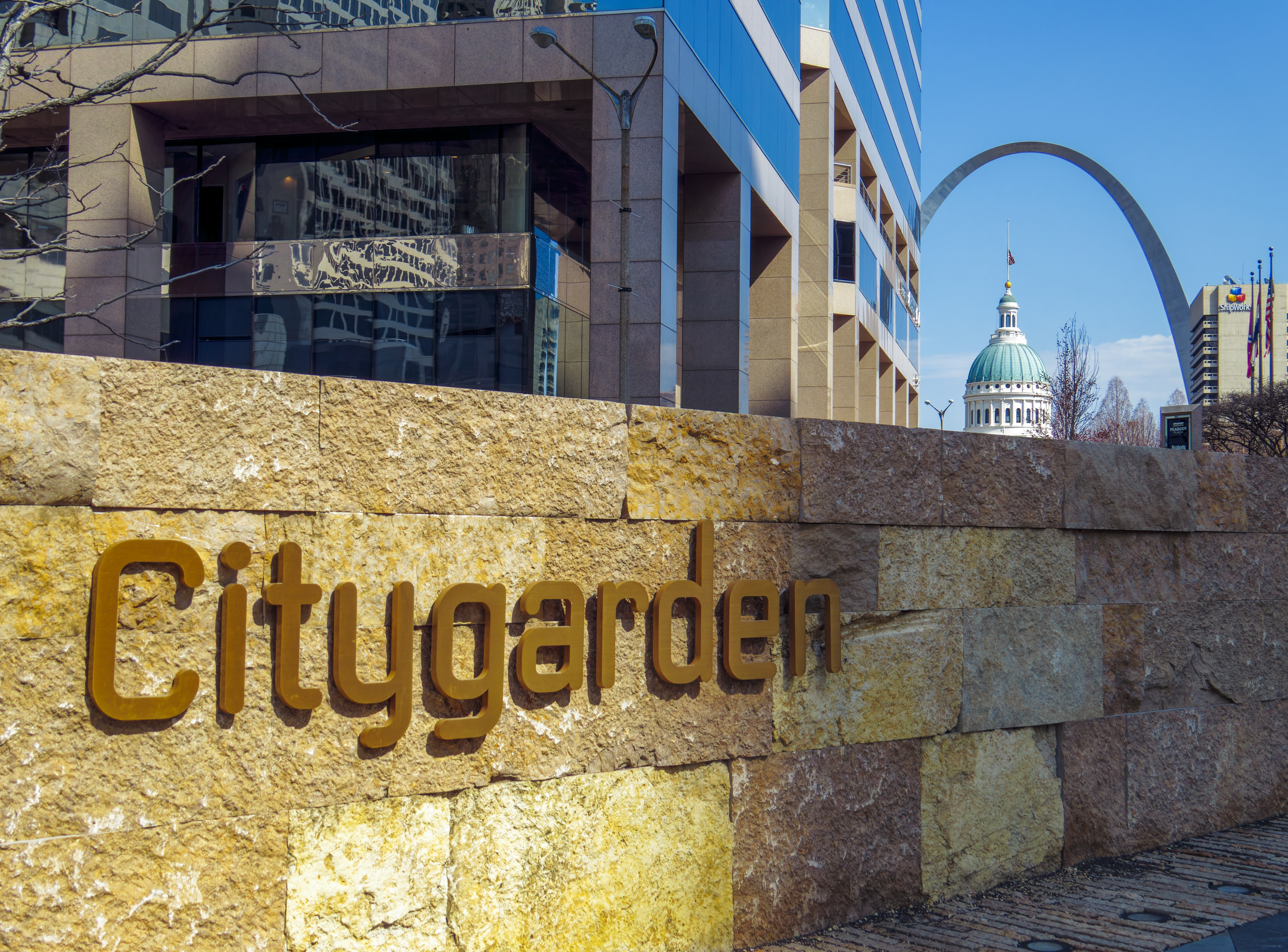
Citygarden sign

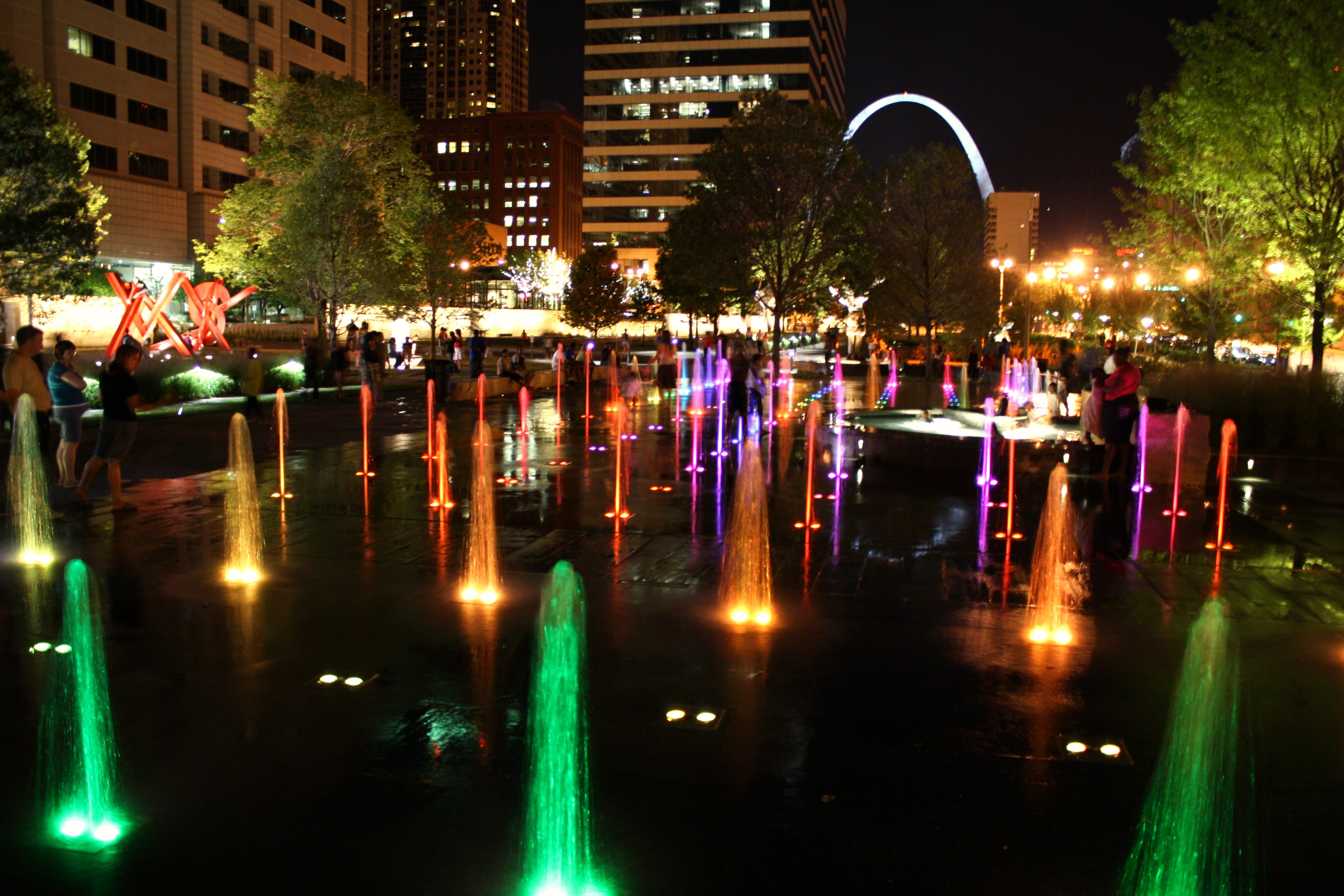
Citygarden at night

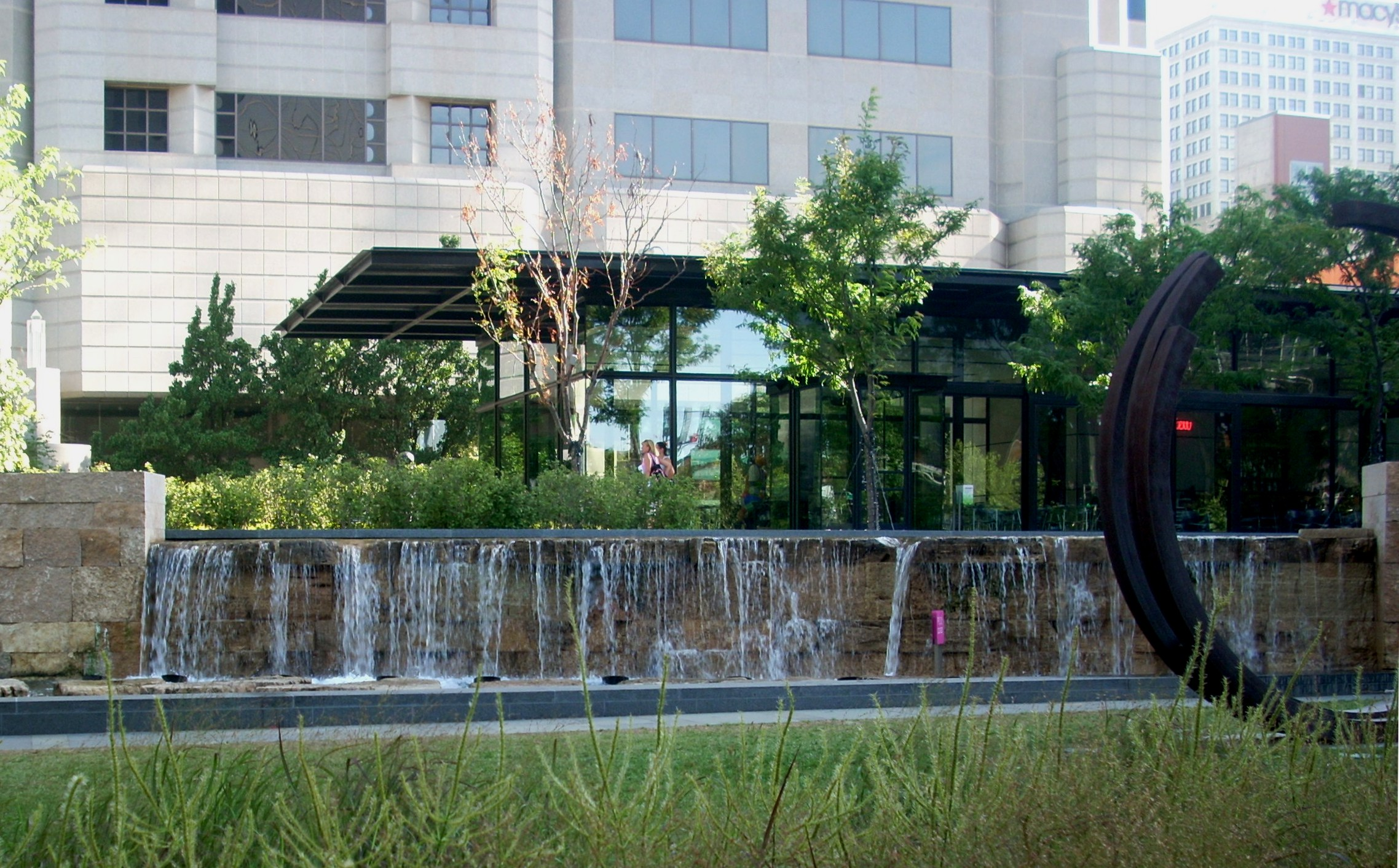
The former Terrace View restaurant

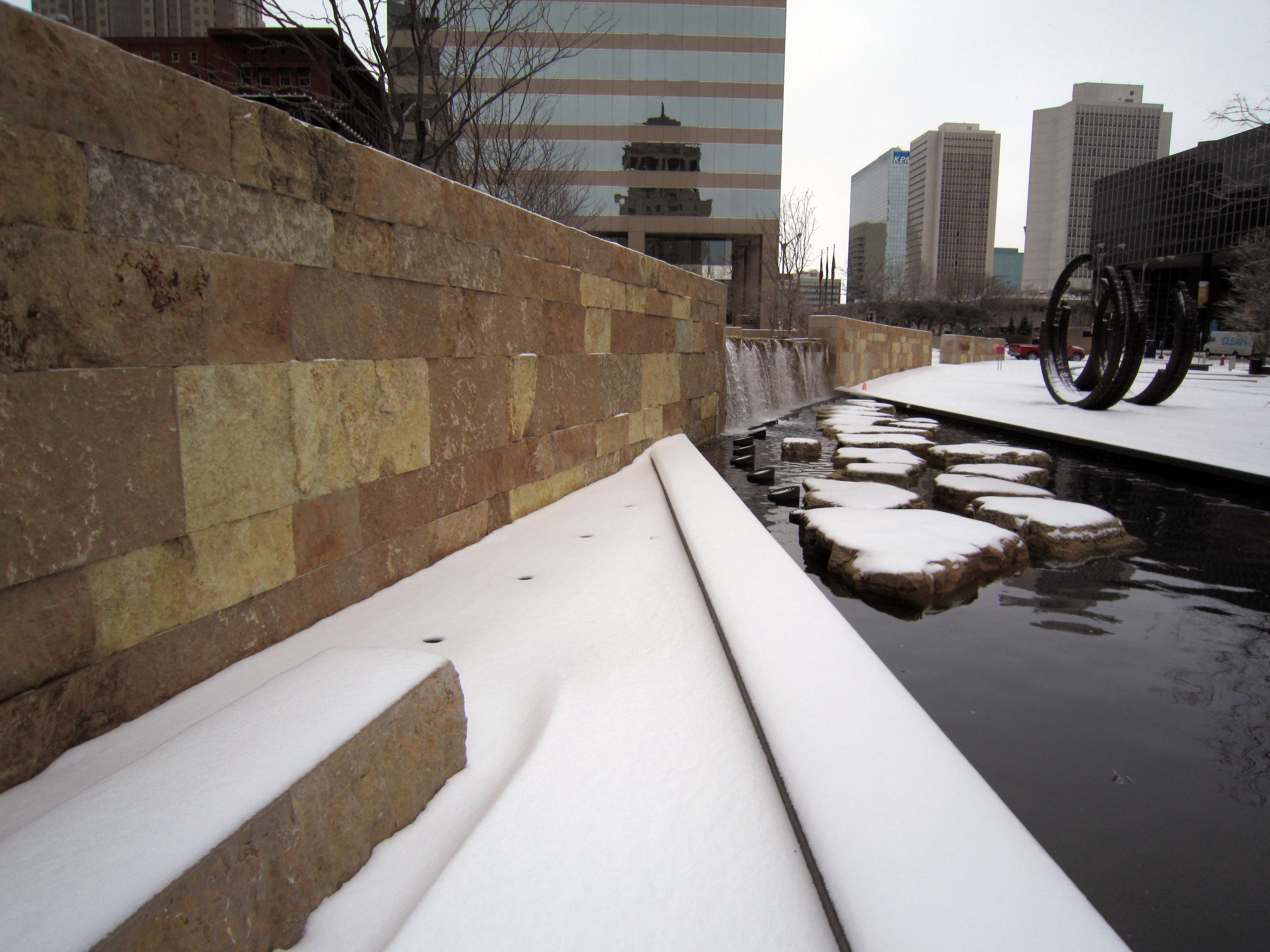
Citygarden in the snow

=== Serra Sculpture Park ===
Serra Sculpture Park (Twain)

This block originally opened in 1976 and is dominated by Richard Serra's Twain sculpture which itself was dedicated in 1981. It was designed specifically for the location and is intended to give viewers insights and perspectives as they walk around it. The park was built with no paths as Serra didn't want to direct from the start how people walk into and around his sculpture. The sculpture was controversial from its opening with some describing it as "big iron sheets." Initially, the block was to be landscaped, lit, and had benches installed. Instead, within a few years and lack of maintenance funding, much of the landscaping had died and the lights and benches had succumbed to vandalism.

No improvements were detailed for Twain in the 2009 master plan as improvements to Citygarden's two blocks to the east were moving forward.

To the north of this block is the historic Southwestern Bell Building. To the south is 1010 Market Street, home to KSDK.

=== Civil Courts Building ===
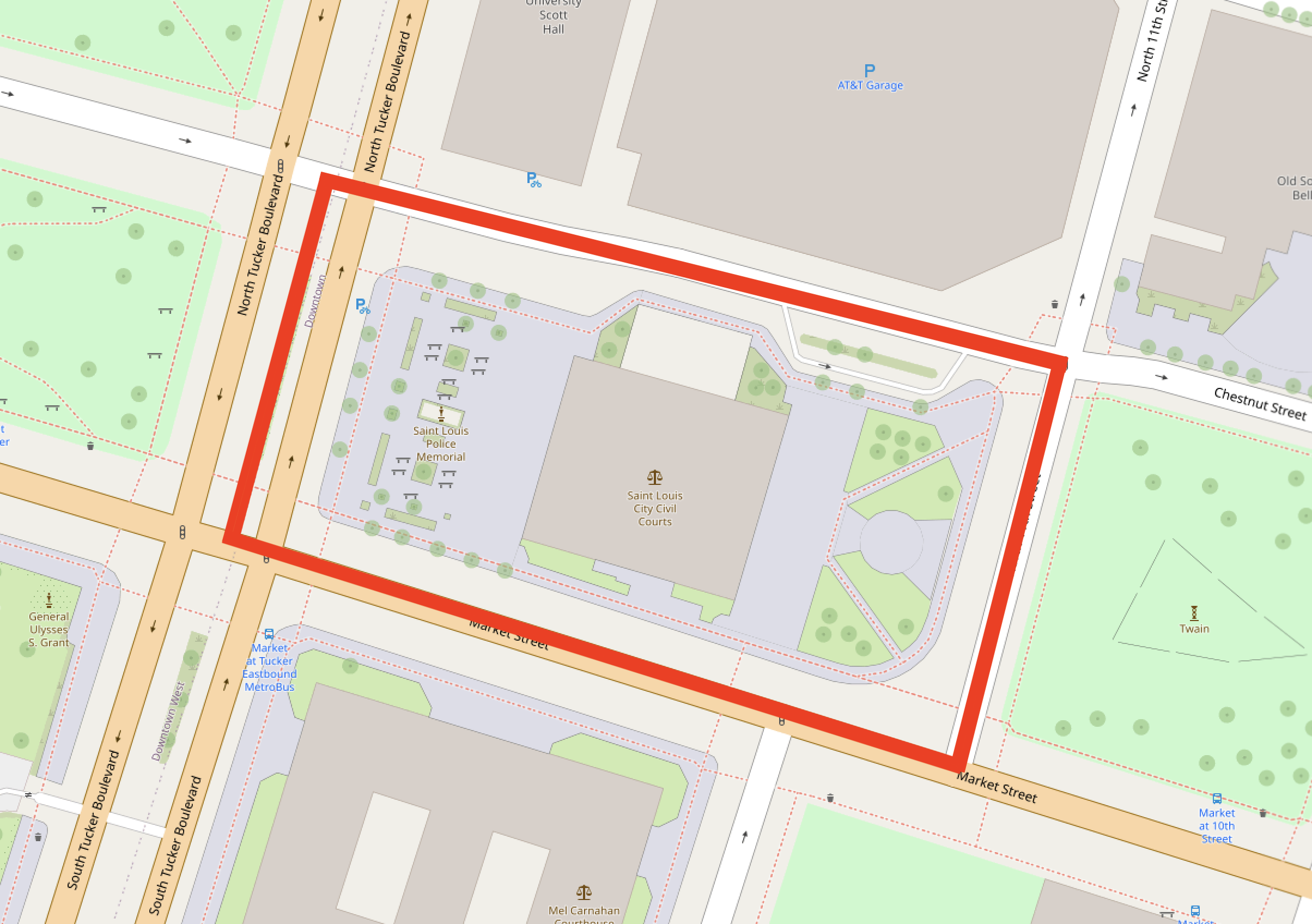
Civil Courts Building

The Civil Courts Building is a landmark courthouse used by the 22nd Judicial Circuit Court of Missouri in St. Louis.

Prior to the Civil Court's opening, city courts operated out of the Old St. Louis County Courthouse, which had become city property when the city and county split during the "Great Divorce" in 1877. In 1923, city voters ratified an $87 million bond issue to fund new public buildings and a civic center according to the City Beautiful movement in downtown St. Louis including the Kiel Auditorium and Opera House, Soldiers Memorial, and a new courthouse.

The Civil Courts Building opened in 1930 and replaced the Old Courthouse as the city's main courthouse triggering a lawsuit by the descendants of Auguste Chouteau. One of the city's founders, Chouteau had donated land for the courthouse on the stipulation that it be used for court purposes in perpetuity. Since it was no longer being used for that purpose, his descendants unsuccessfully sued to regain control of the site.

The pyramid roof was designed to resemble the Mausoleum of Maussollos, which was one of the Seven Wonders of the Ancient World. It features 32 Ionic columns (8 on each side). Each column has 6 fluted drums, a cap, and are about 42 feet (13 m) high, 5 1/2 feet in diameter and are made of Indiana limestone. The roof is made of cast aluminum and is topped by two 12-foot (3.7 m) high sphinx-like sculptures with the fleur-de-lis of St. Louis adorned on their chests. The sphinxes were sculpted by Cleveland artist, Steven A. Rebeck. The building is frequently featured in the center of photos of the Gateway Arch from the Illinois side, as its location on the Mall is lined up in the middle directly behind the Old Courthouse.

The Carnahan Courthouse opened in 1935 across Market Street from the Civil Courts Building. It operated as the city's federal courthouse until the Thomas F. Eagleton United States Courthouse opened in 2000. In 2001, the courthouse became office space for the 22nd Judicial Court and other city departments.

In 2022, a new memorial was unveiled on the grounds of the courthouse. Called the Freedom Suits Memorial, the 14-foot bronze statue on a granite base honors hundreds of enslaved Missourians who filed a series of legal challenges, mostly before the Civil War, seeking freedom. The statue depicts a woman at a judge's bench, under the rotunda of the Old Courthouse. The back of the sculpture shows a slaveowner's house and a handler along the riverfront, while the other side shows Native Americans canoeing on the river. The granite base includes the engraving of about 330 enslaved people's names.

The 2009 master plan didn't propose any specific improvements to the Civil Courts block, other than continuing the "Hallway" feature to the Civic Room.

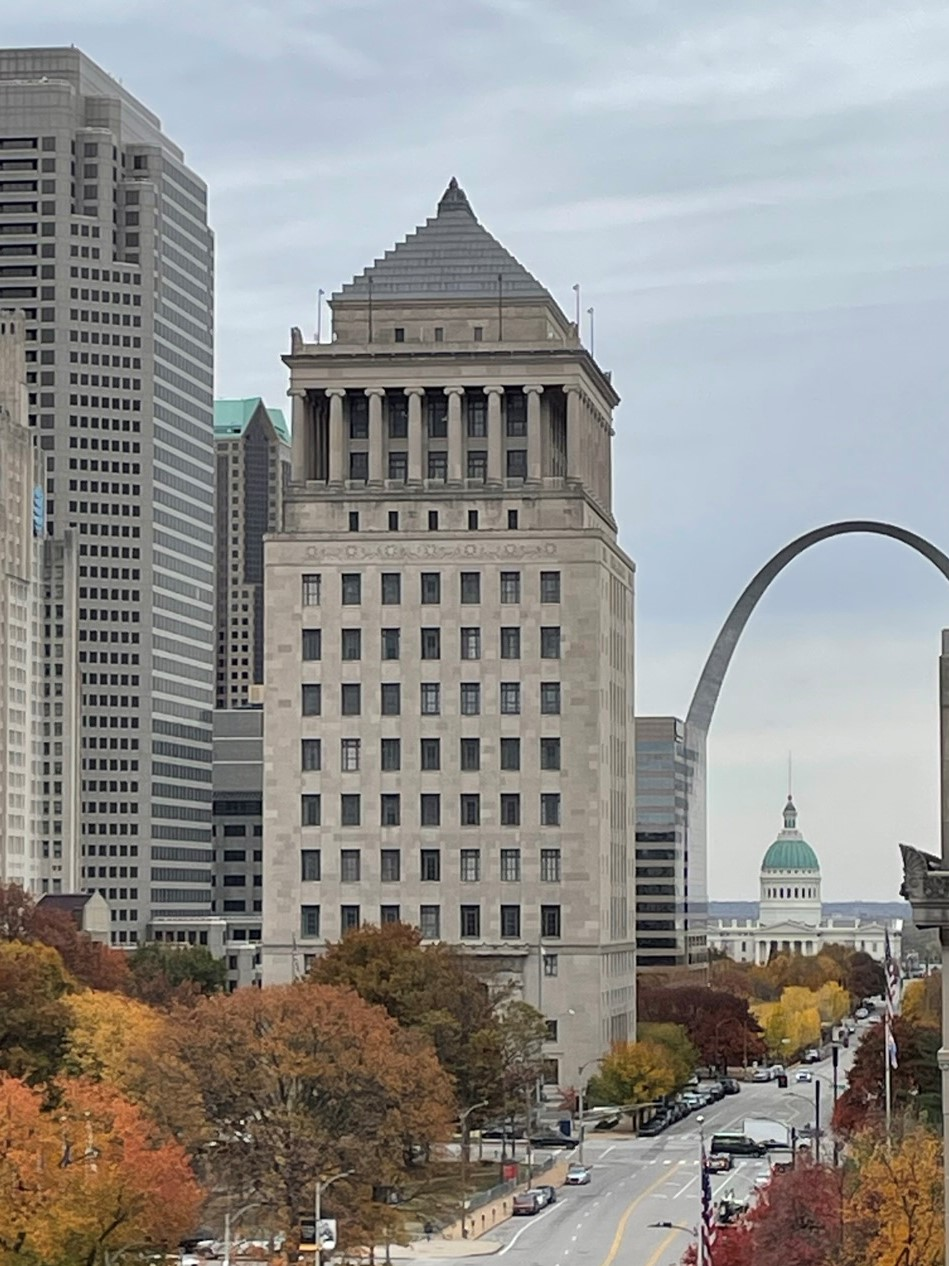
The Civil Courts Building seen along Market Street

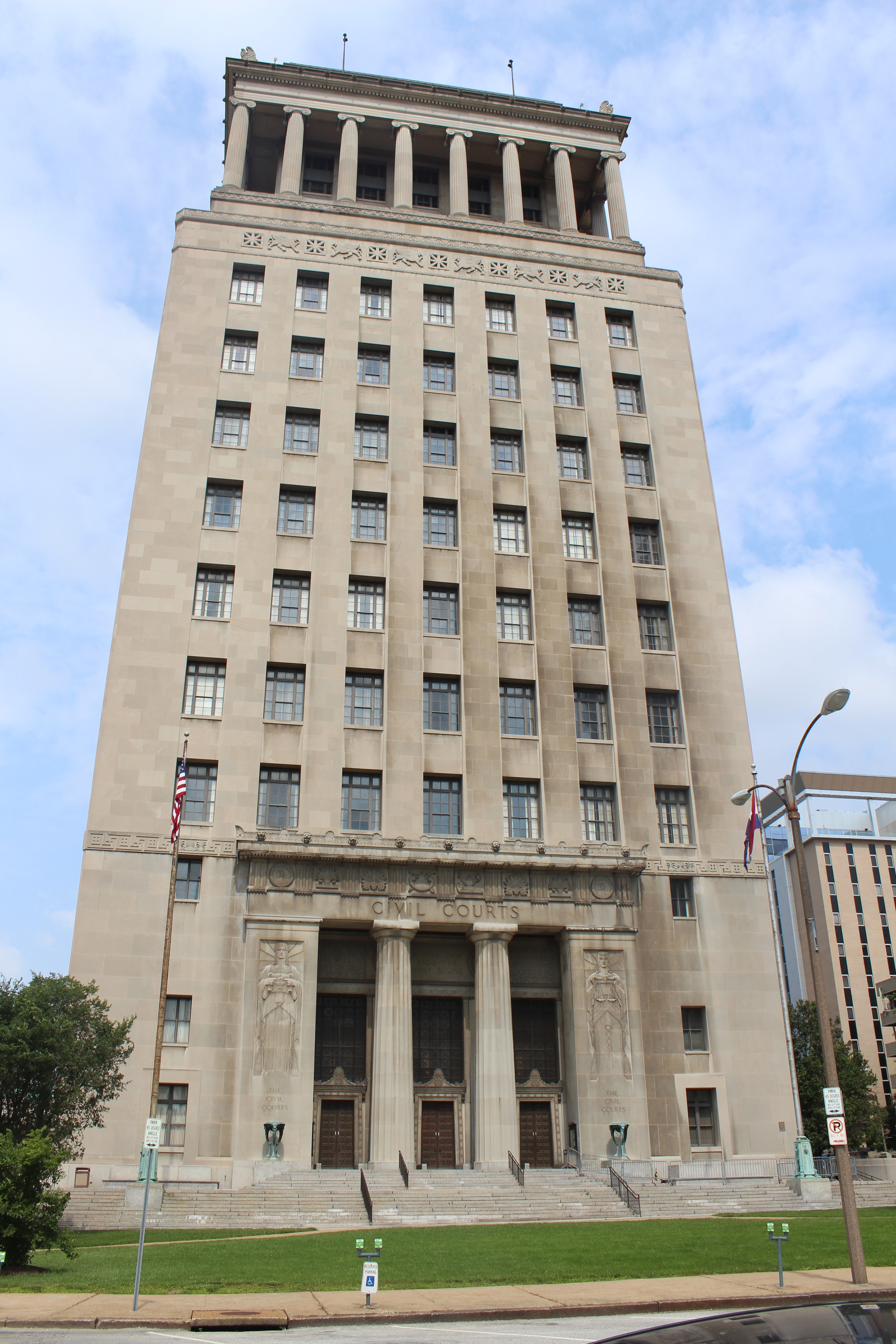
Civil Courts Building

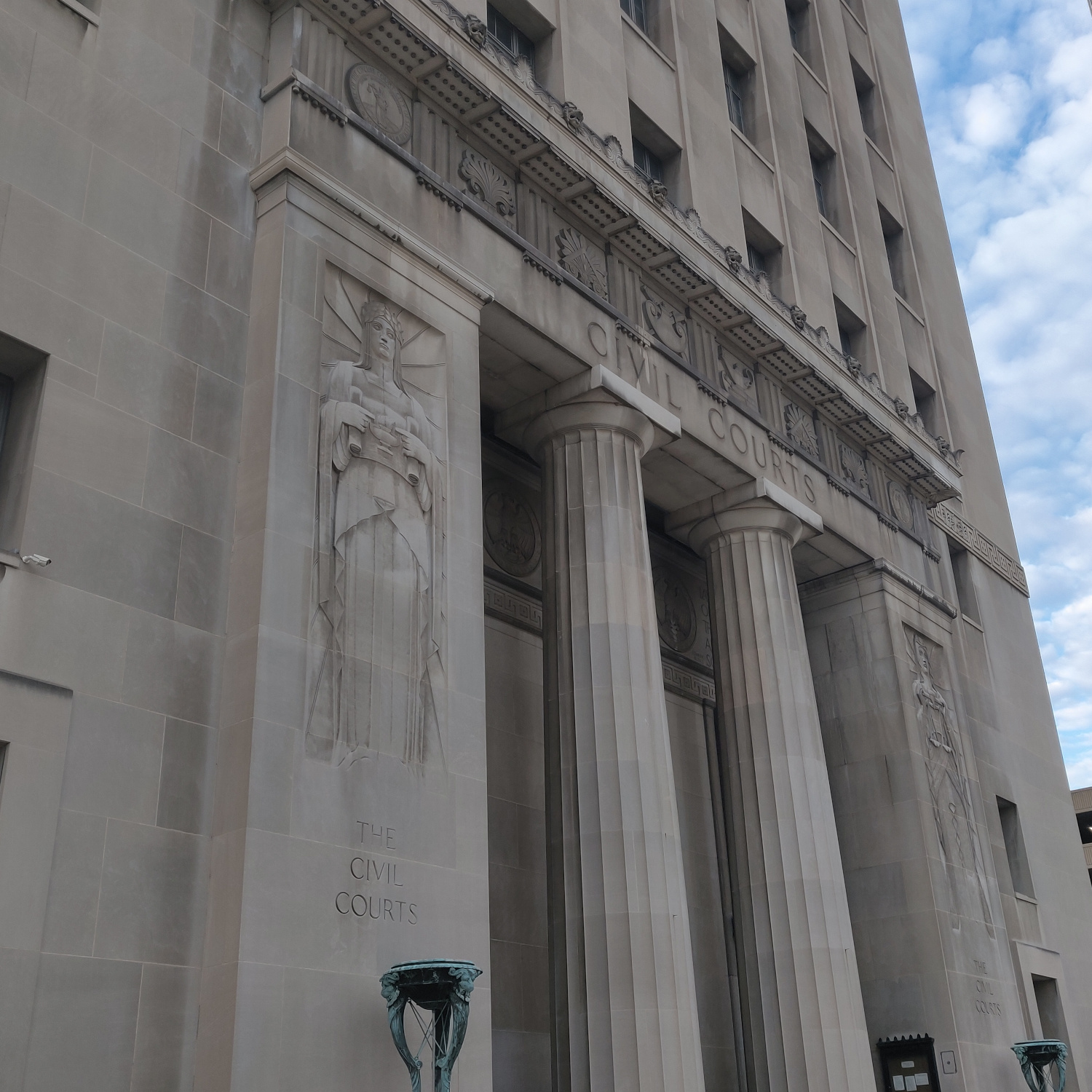
Entrance columns

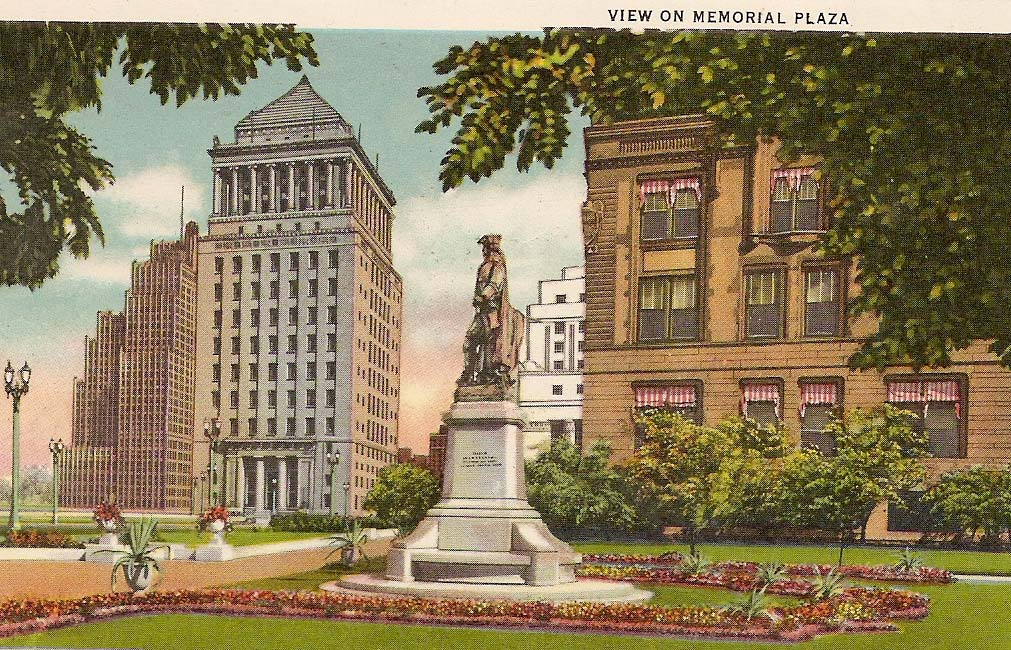
Old postcard of Memorial Plaza and City Hall

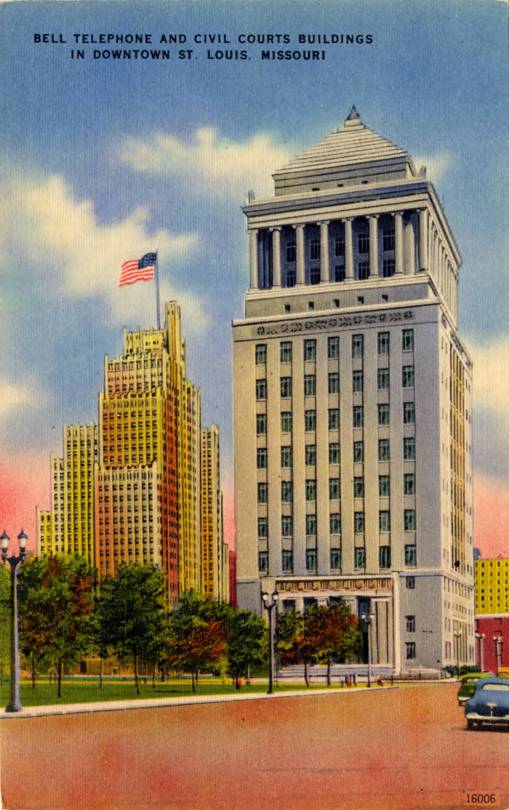
Old postcard of the Civil Courts and SBC buildings

=== Memorial Plaza ===
Memorial Plaza

Memorial Plaza is made up of nine blocks of mostly green space between Tucker Boulevard and 18th Street. The first section opened between Tucker and 15th Street in 1932 and includes Eternal Flame Park, Kaufman Park, and Poelker Park. Soldiers Memorial opened on the center block in 1938 and also includes the World War II Memorial Court. It centers the axis that frames the entrance to the Central Library to the north on Olive Street and the former Municipal Courts Building to the south on Market Street. Other notable buildings that front this section of the park include City Hall, the Stifel Theatre, and the Park Pacific Building.

In 1960, a three block extension of Memorial Plaza opened between 15th and 18th streets with 16th Street being eliminated between Market and Chestnut streets. These blocks were lightly landscaped and the only notable feature were formations of concrete and stained glass screens located around small fountains. In 1961, the Plaza Square Apartments opened bringing 1,090 units to the four blocks north of Memorial Plaza between 15th and 17th streets. The St. Louis Post Office fronts this part of the park along Market Street.

According to the 2009 master plan, Memorial Plaza is to be split into a Civic Room and a Neighborhood Room. The Civic Room includes the original 1932 section and is planned to become the predominant space for outdoor festivals and events. The Neighborhood Room will include the 1960 addition and is to be primarily residential in nature, with facilities like lawns, playgrounds, sand-volleyball courts, and youth soccer fields for nearby residents.

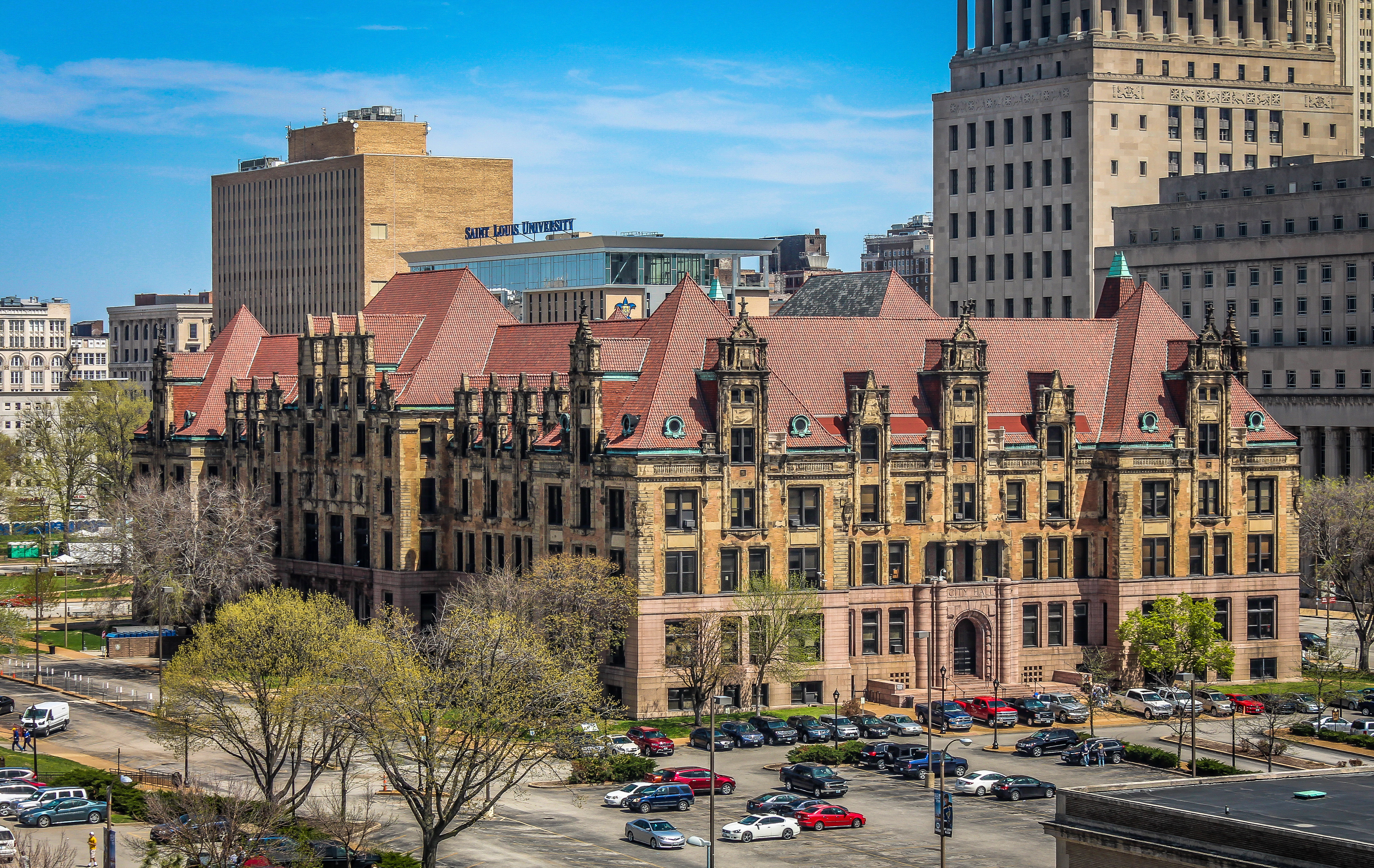
St. Louis City Hall in 2015

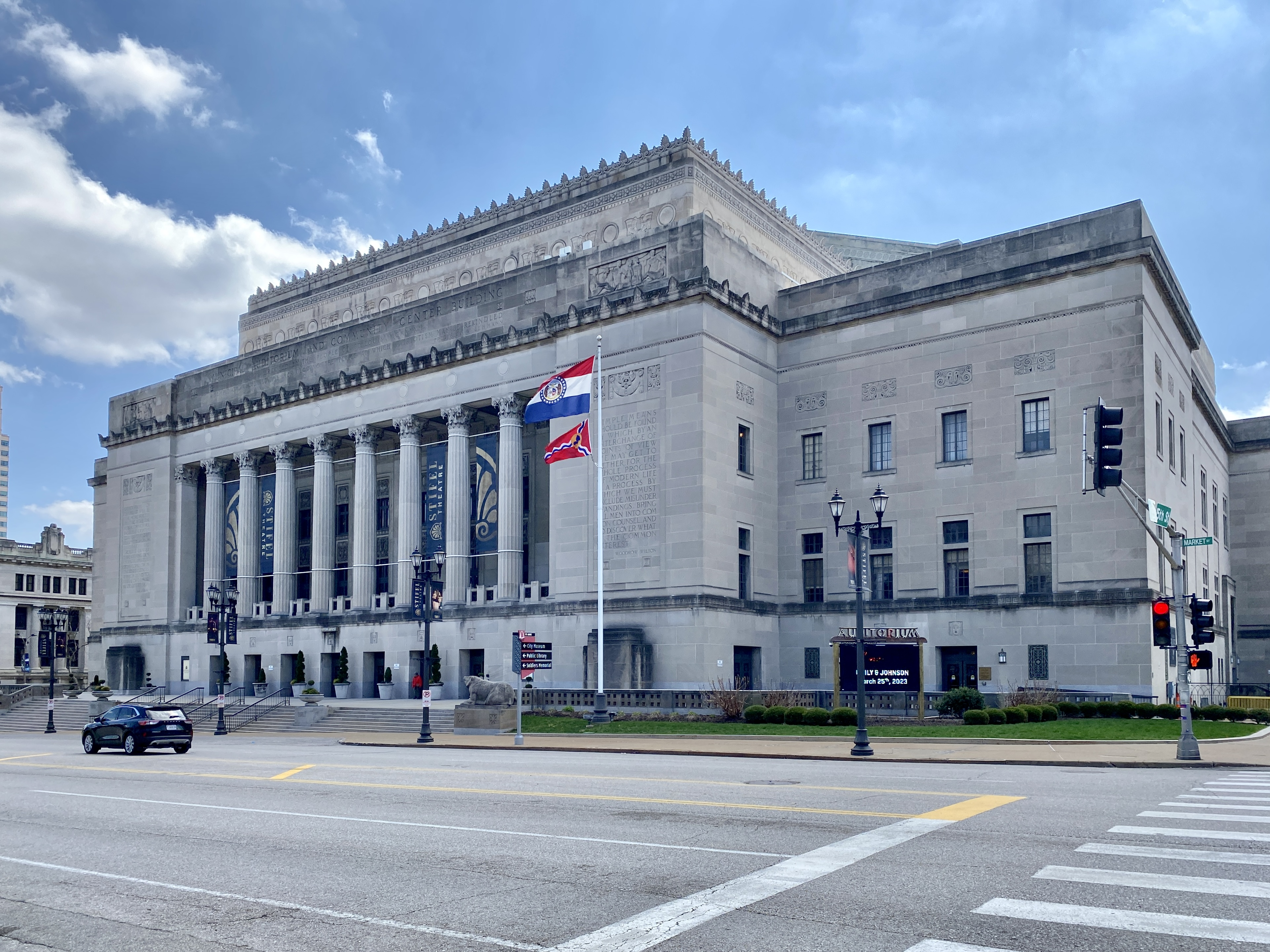
Stifel Theatre on Market Street

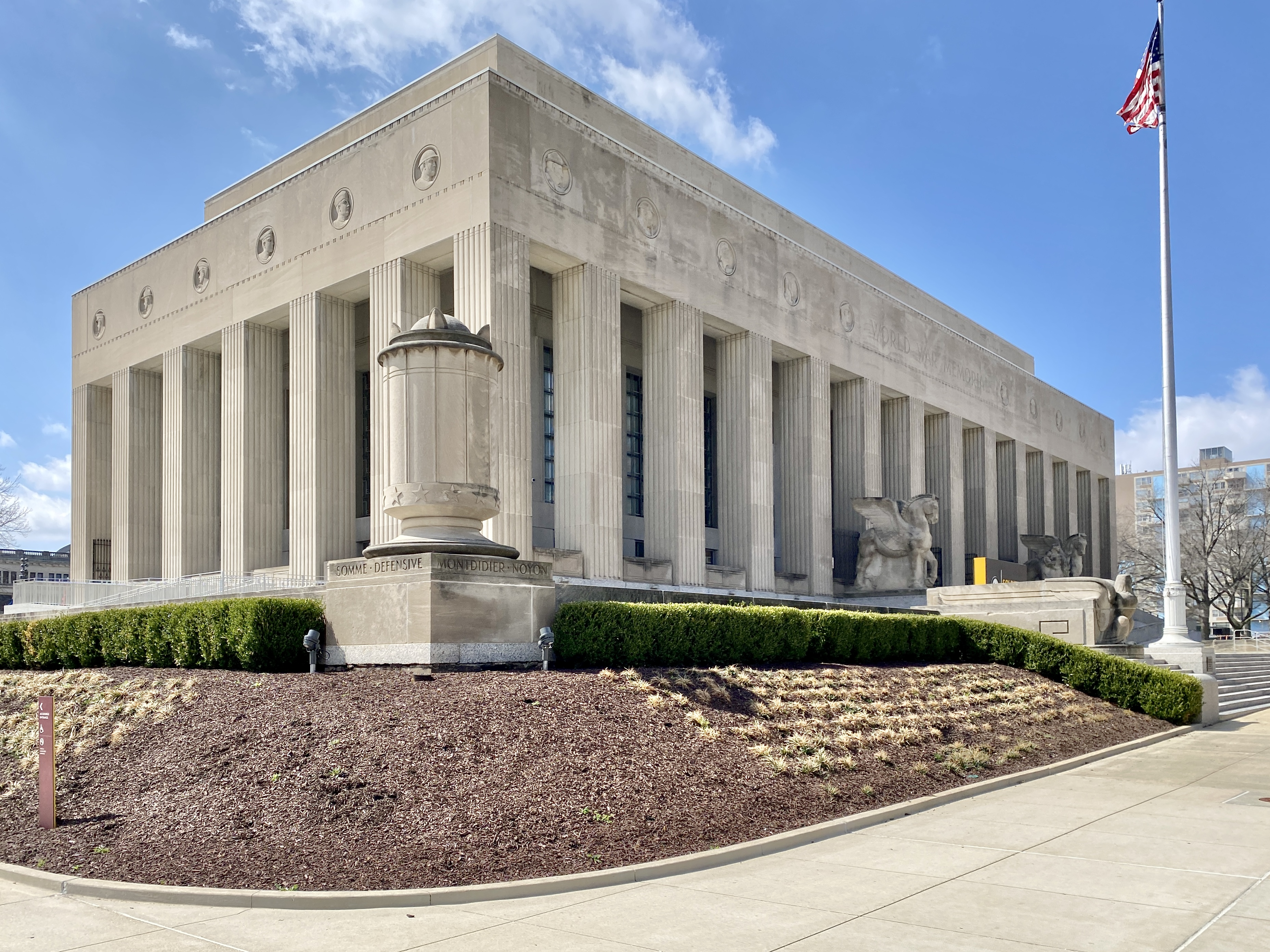
Soldiers Memorial

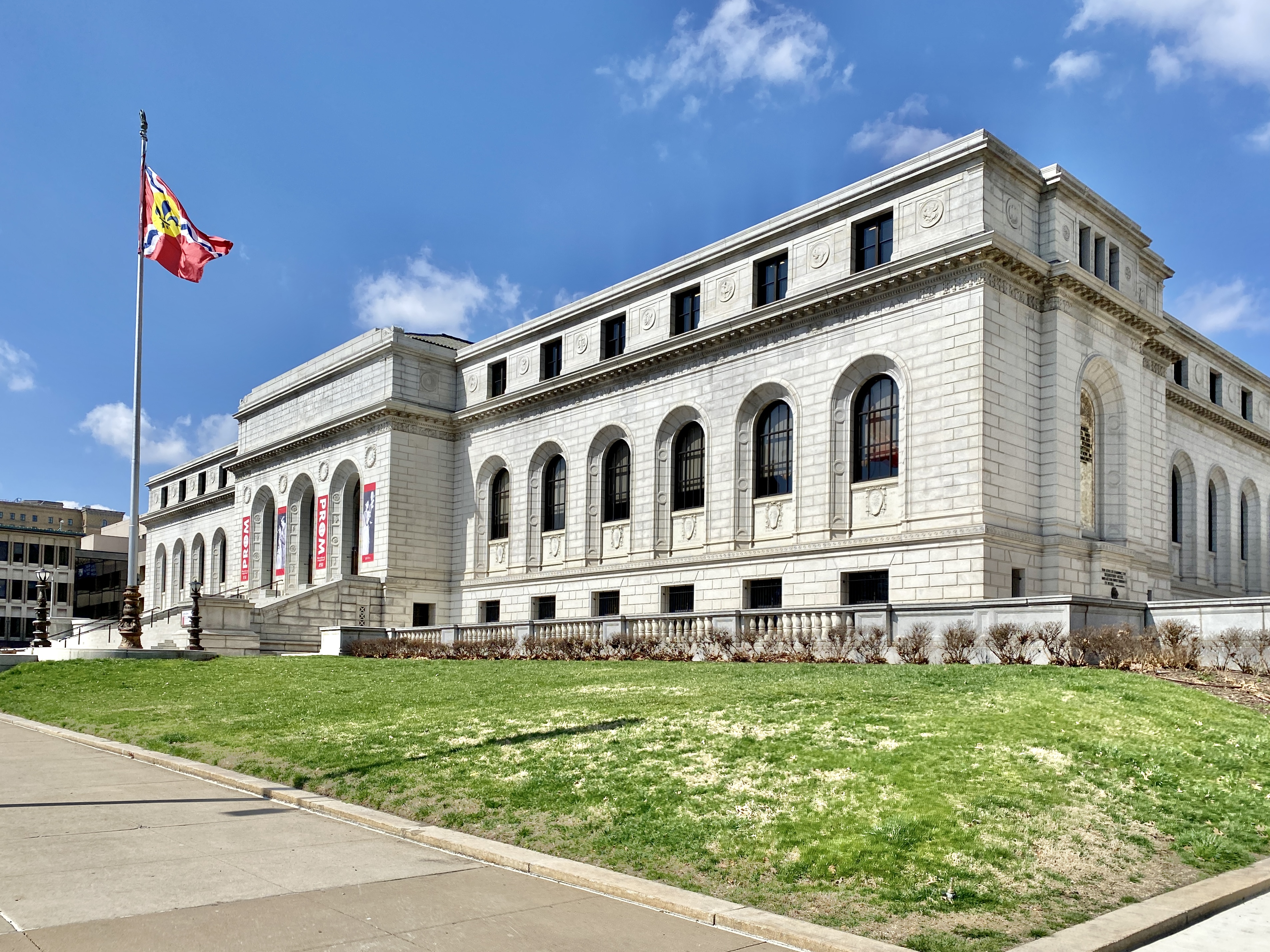
Central Library on Olive

St. Louis Post Office seen from Plaza Square

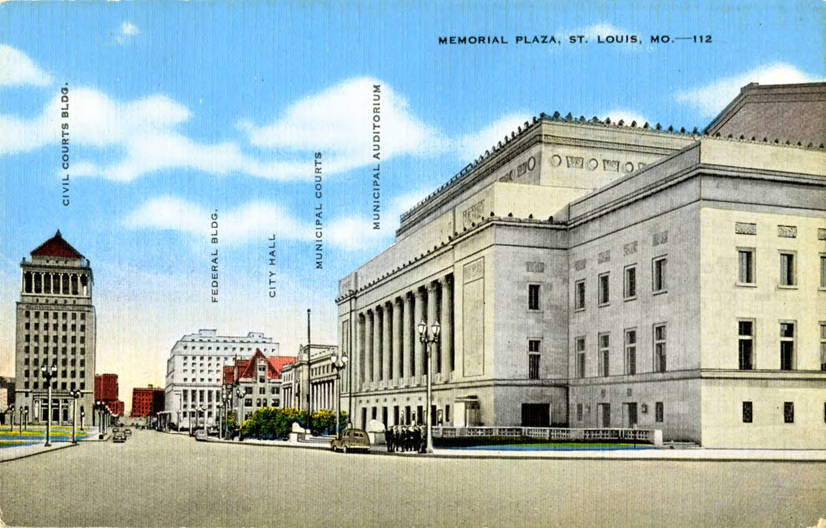
Memorial Plaza postcard

=== Aloe Plaza ===
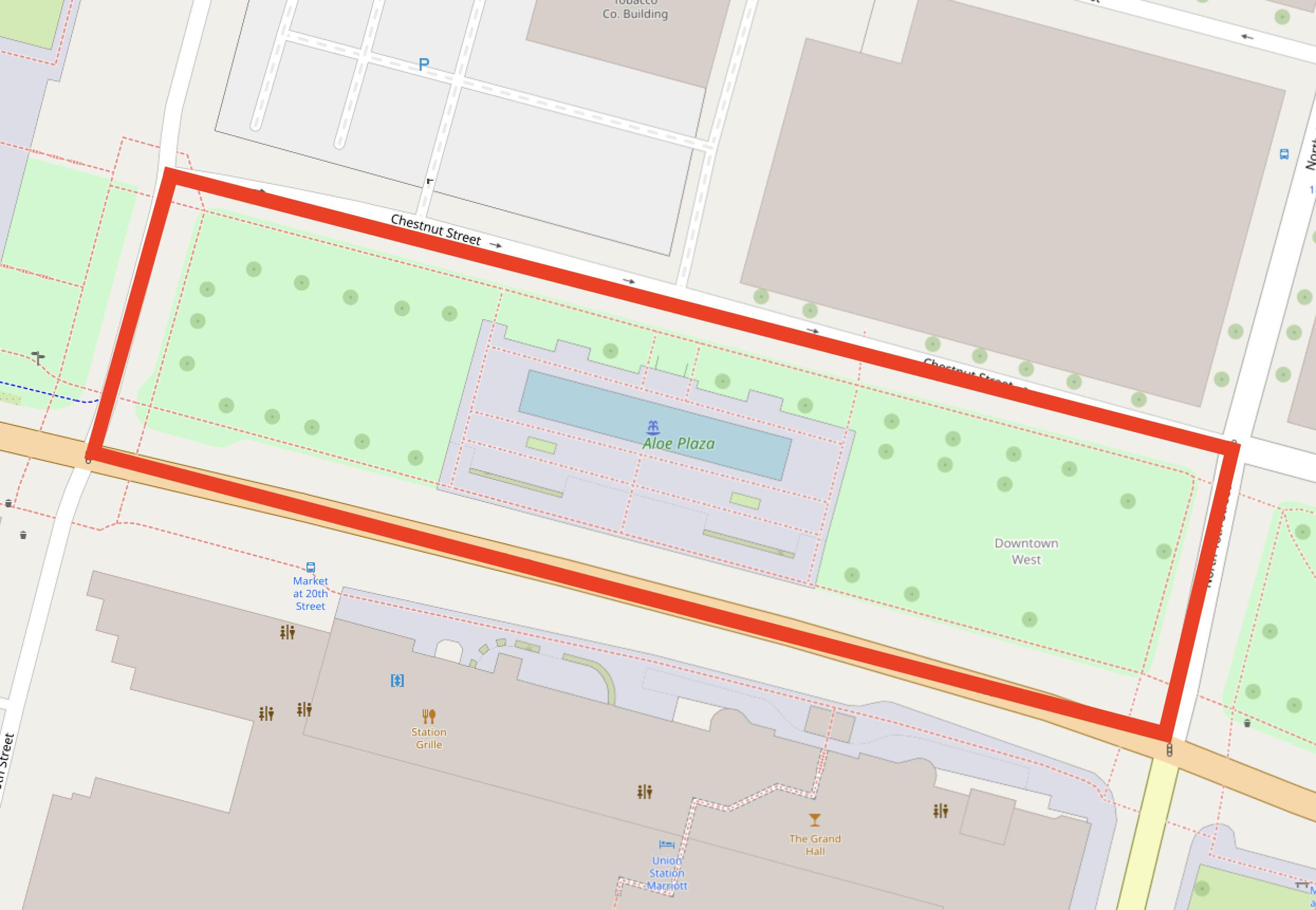
Aloe Plaza

In 1923 city voters passed an $87 million bond issue that would fund public improvements, including a civic center downtown. At the time city leaders felt the "slums" that fronted the city's large public buildings were a "depressing influence" on visitors to St. Louis. Using funds from the bond issue the city cleared the block in front of Union Station and opened Aloe Plaza in 1932. Originally the plaza was lightly landscaped with only trees around its perimeter and a circular garden in the center.

In 1940 the city added Carl Milles' fountain, Meeting of the Waters, to the center of the block. Symbolizing the confluence of the Mississippi and Missouri rivers, two large figures represent each river and seventeen mythical creatures representing smaller tributaries adorn the fountain. Initially, the fountain met some criticism for its irreverent features, particularly for the nudity of the main figures (a male figure representing the Mississippi River and a female figure representing Missouri River). Milles had named the fountain Wedding of the Waters and conceived the seventeen smaller naked figures as a wedding party. Officials felt that a nude wedding ceremony was offensive, and insisted that the name be changed to Meeting of the Waters.

Per the 2009 master plan, Aloe Plaza is due to get some basic landscaping improvements with some additional gardens. Aloe Plaza was considered part of the Mall's terminus until 2020 when the master plan was amended to include the new soccer stadium, Energizer Park, as the terminus.

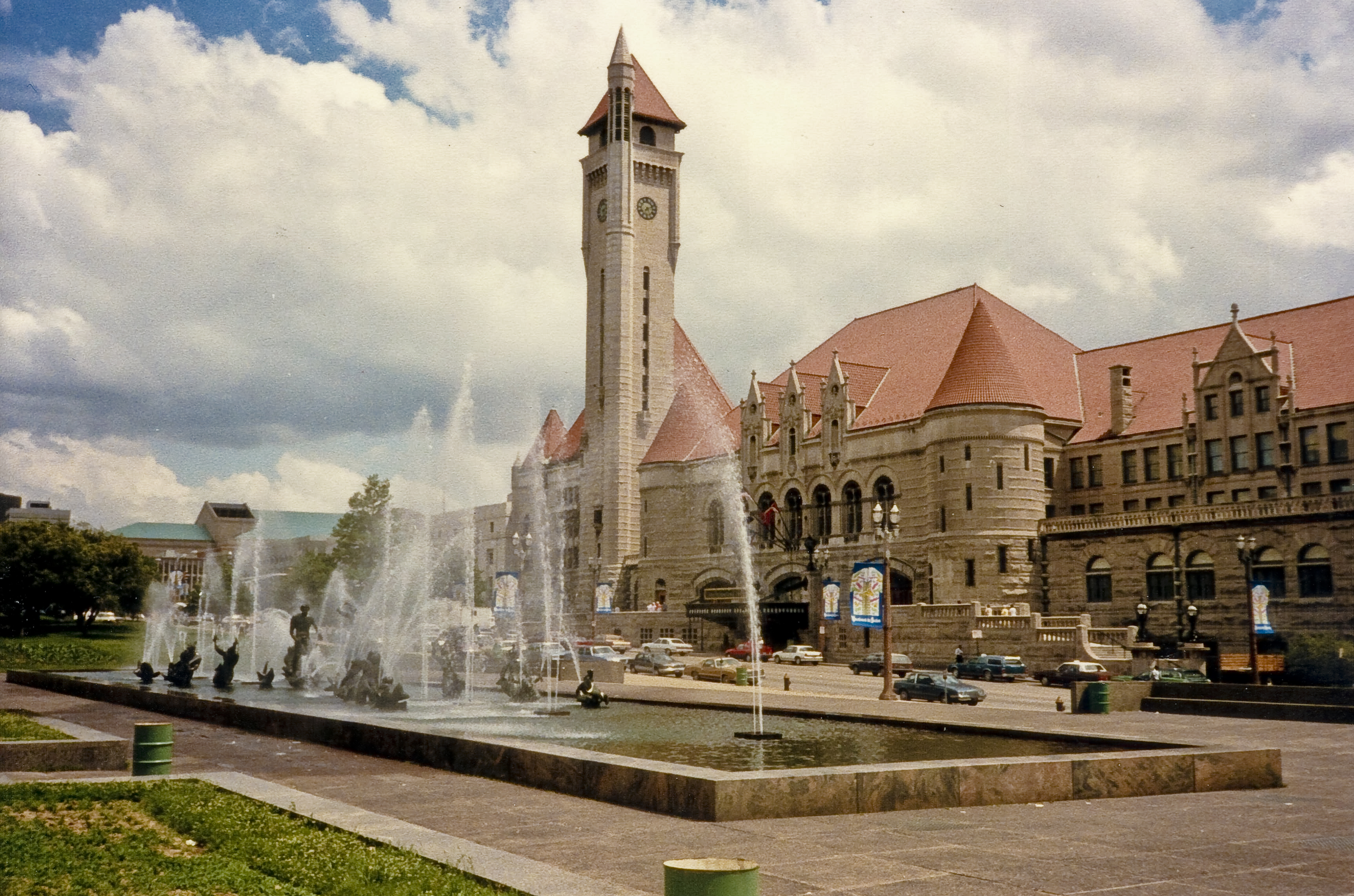
St. Louis Union Station seen from Aloe Plaza

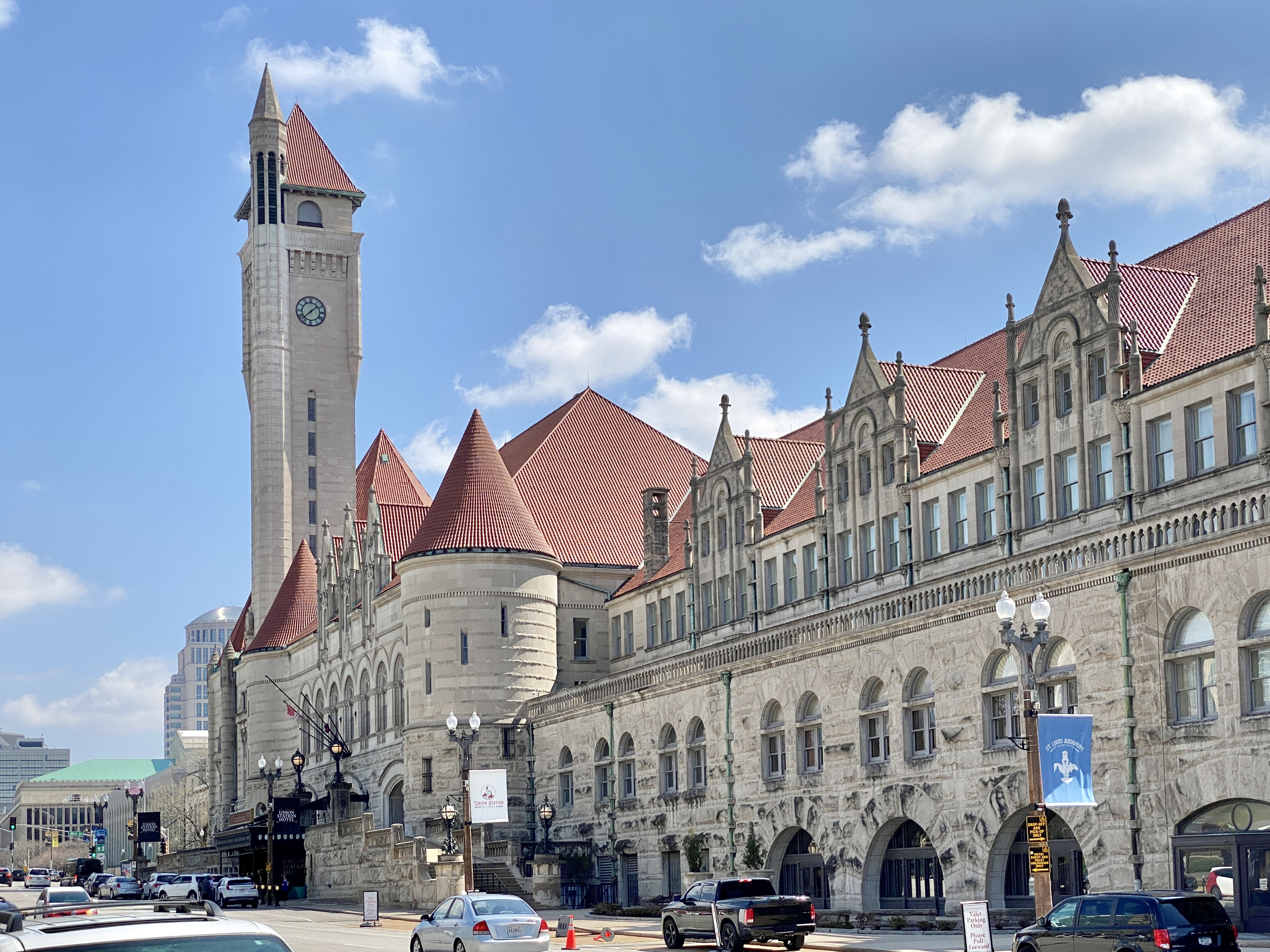
St. Louis Union Station seen from Market Street

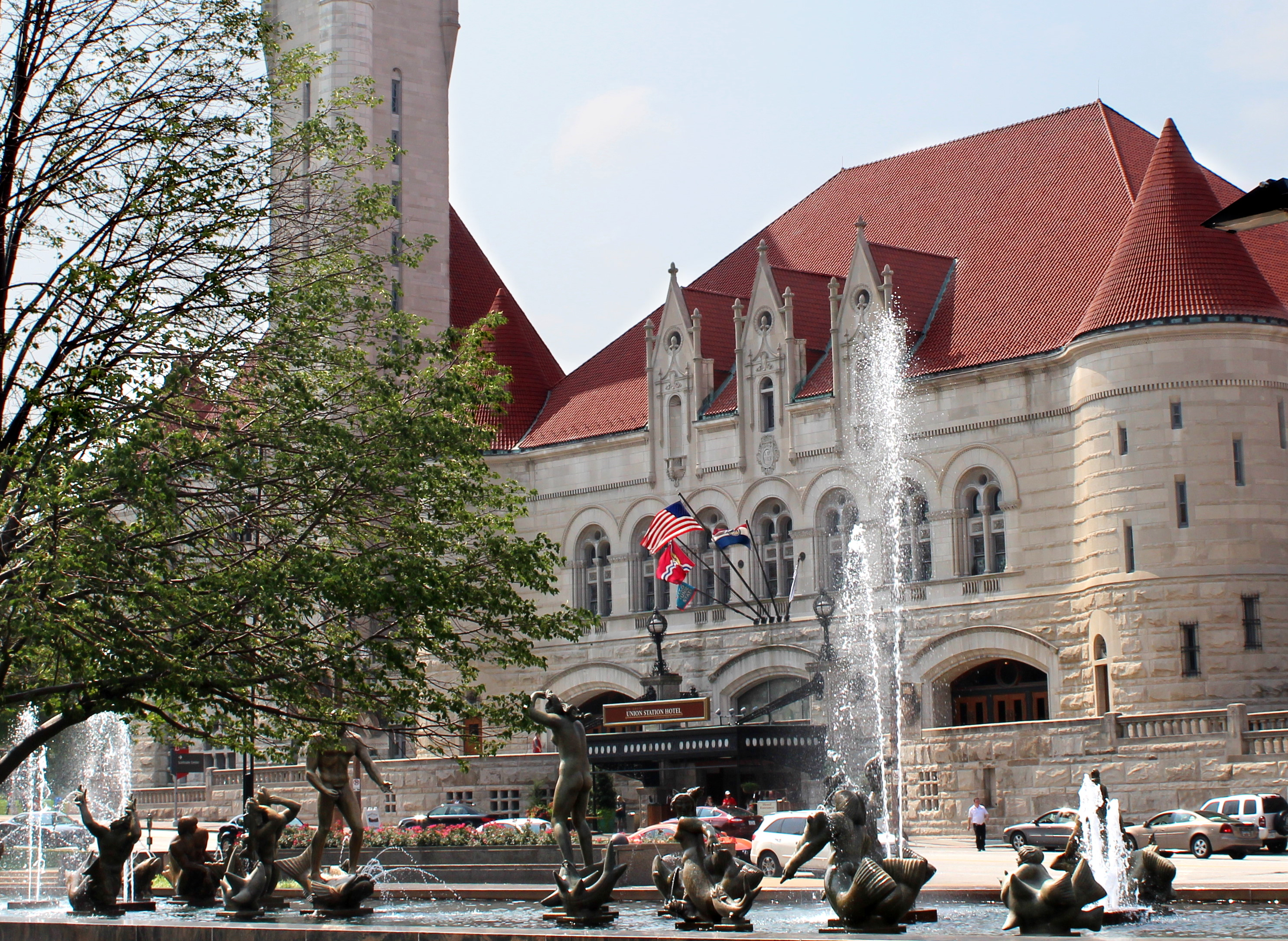
Meeting of the Waters at Aloe Plaza

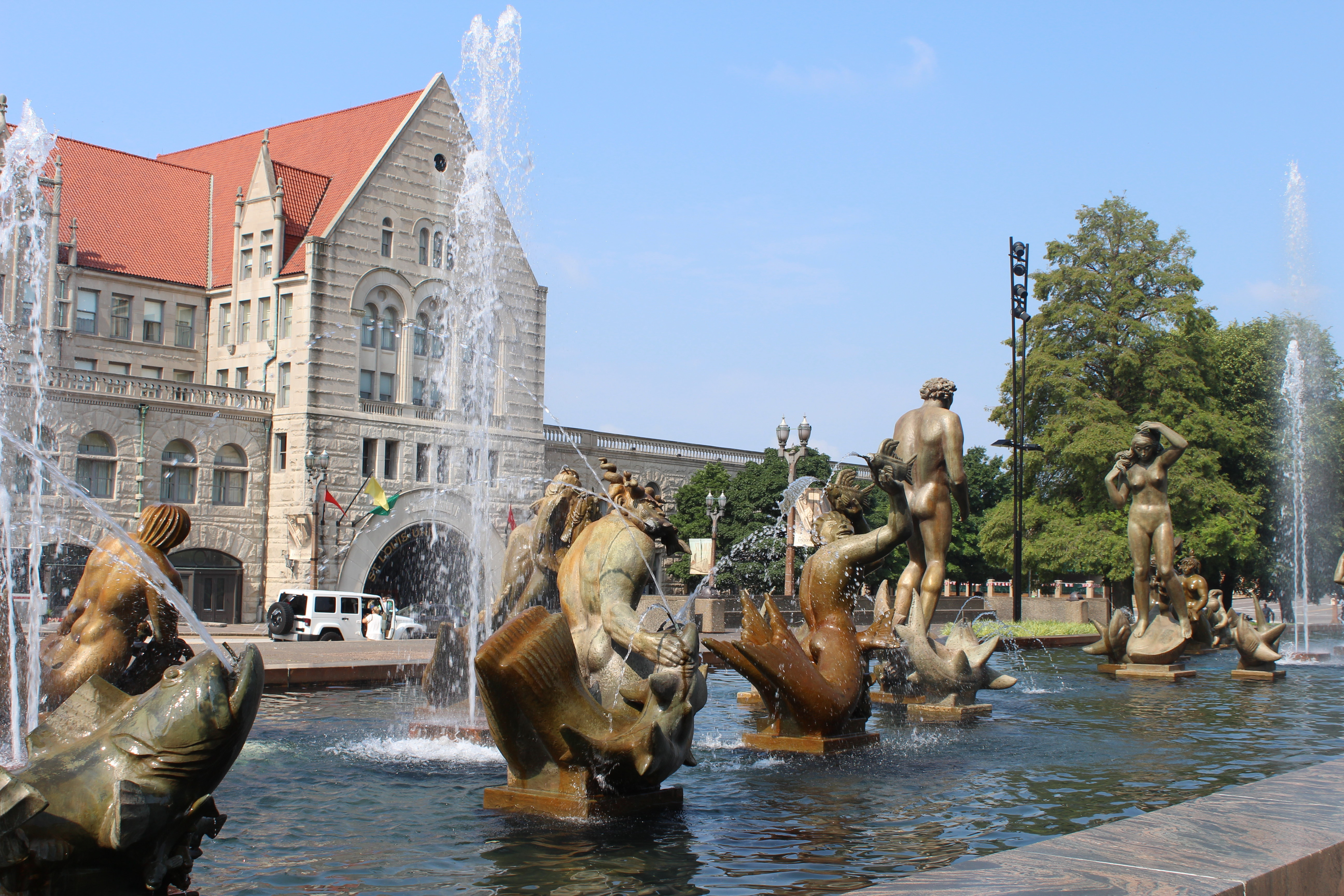
A closeup of the fountain

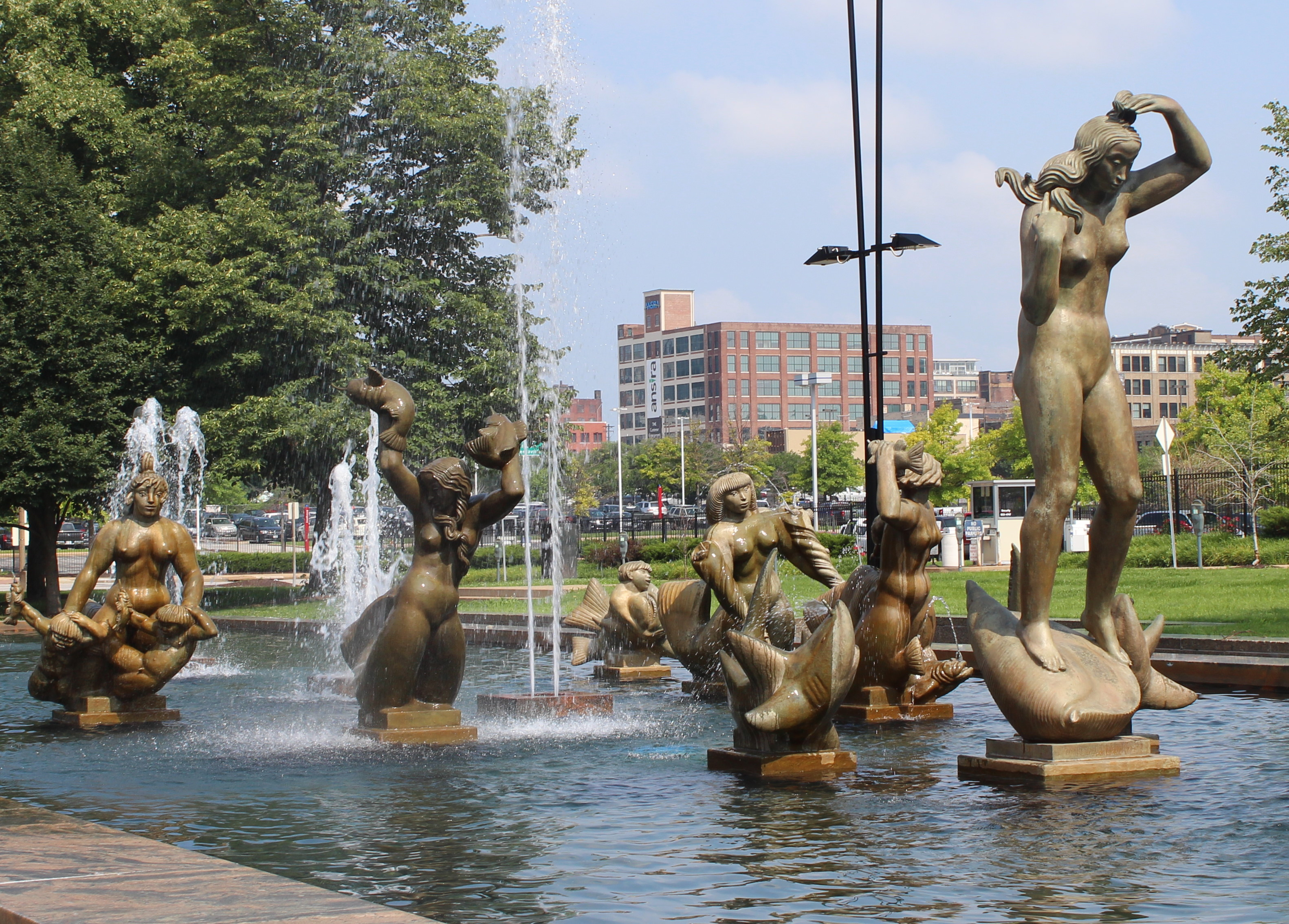
Meeting of the Waters figures

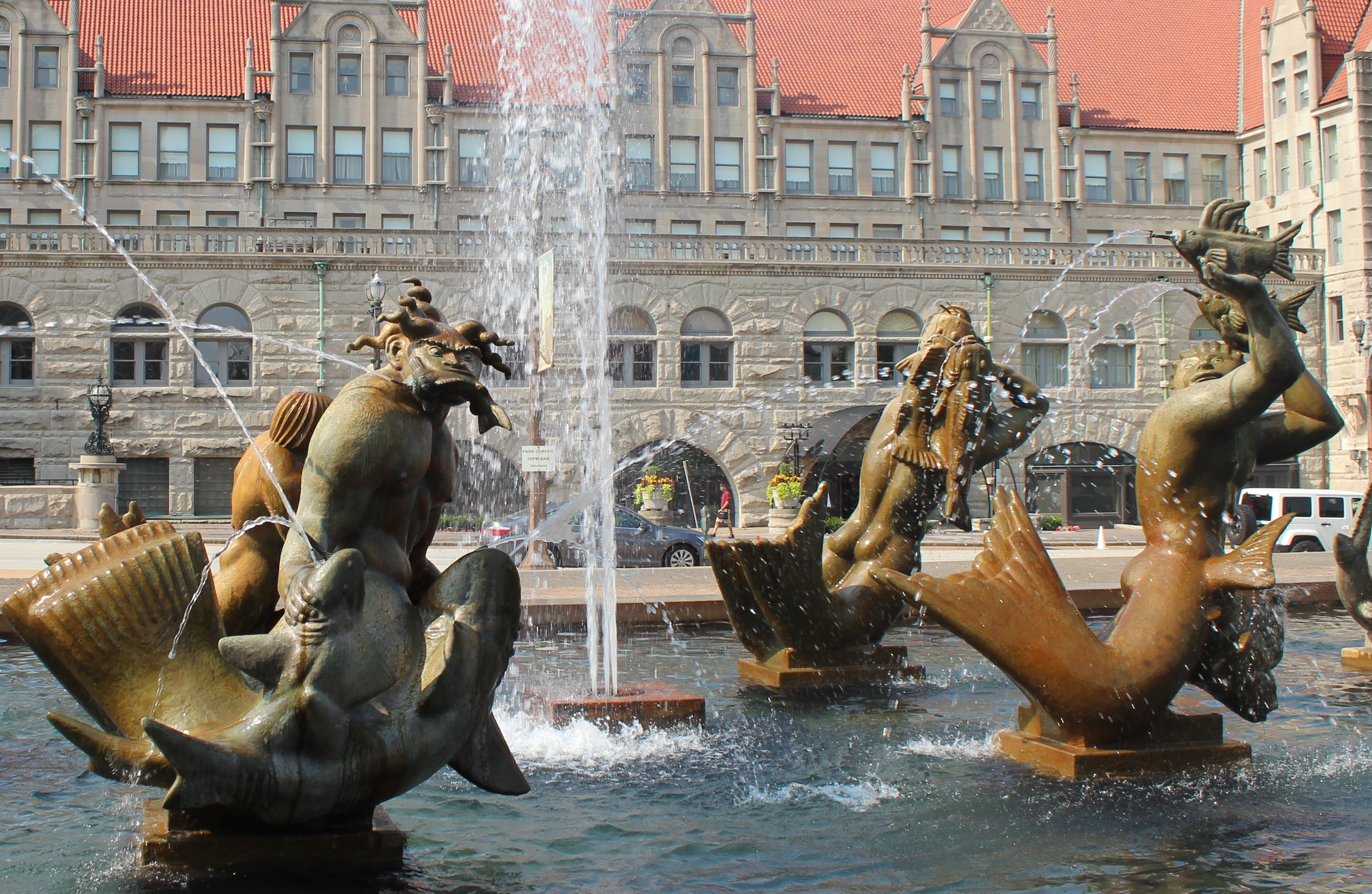
Meeting of the Waters

=== Energizer Park ===
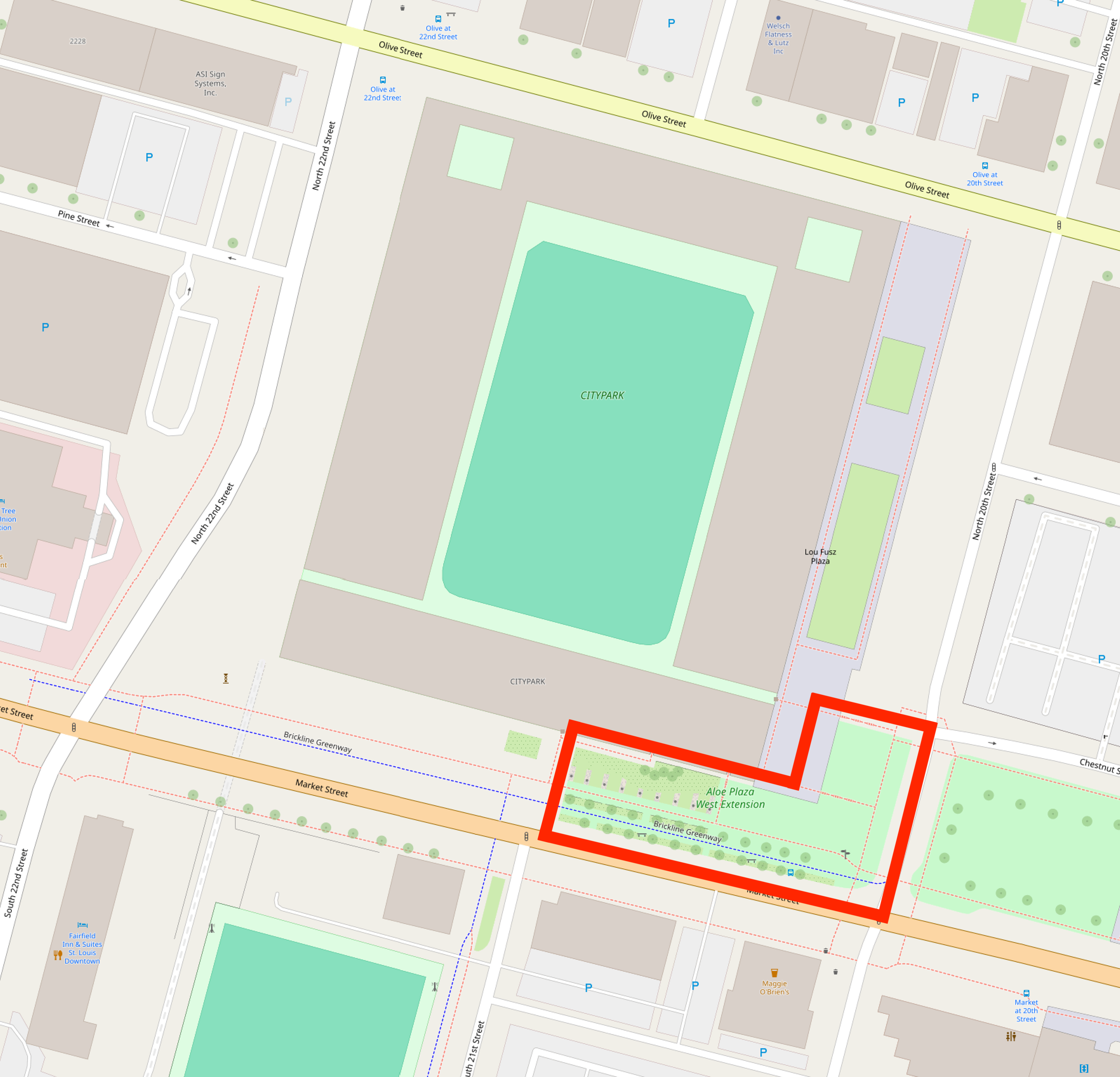
Terminus at Energizer Park

Prior to the construction of Energizer Park, formerly known as CityPark, this area consisted of highway ramps from a never built distributor highway and a small inaccessible park named the Aloe Plaza West Extension at the northwest corner of 20th and Market streets. The 2009 master plan originally proposed an observation earthwork mound for the extension, similar to the ancient mounds at Cahokia, that would have offered a view of the city. Another plan, from a local developer, would have used the reclaimed highway land as part of the Northside redevelopment.

In 2020, after St. Louis had been awarded a Major League Soccer team and the stadium site was selected, the master plan was amended to include the stadium as the Mall's terminus. The stadium provides a western bookend for the Mall while framing the Civil Courts Building and the Gateway Arch. The Aloe Plaza West Extension was incorporated into the stadium's public plazas and the Brickline Greenway along Market.

In 2024, the city is expected to break ground on the 20th Street Mobility Project which will see a shared use path constructed along 20th between the Mall and St. Louis Avenue.

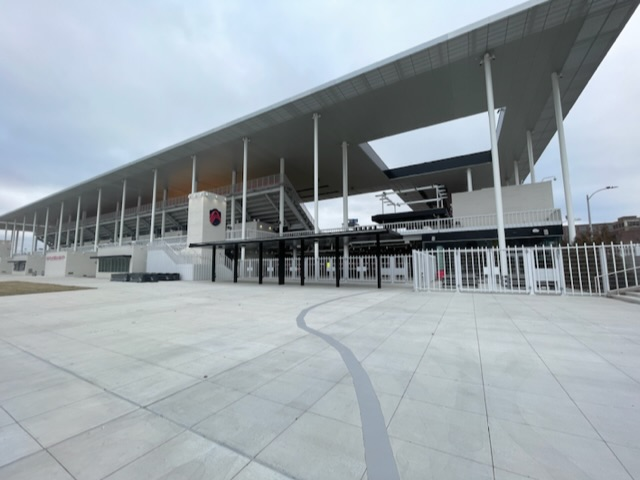
Energizer Park exterior

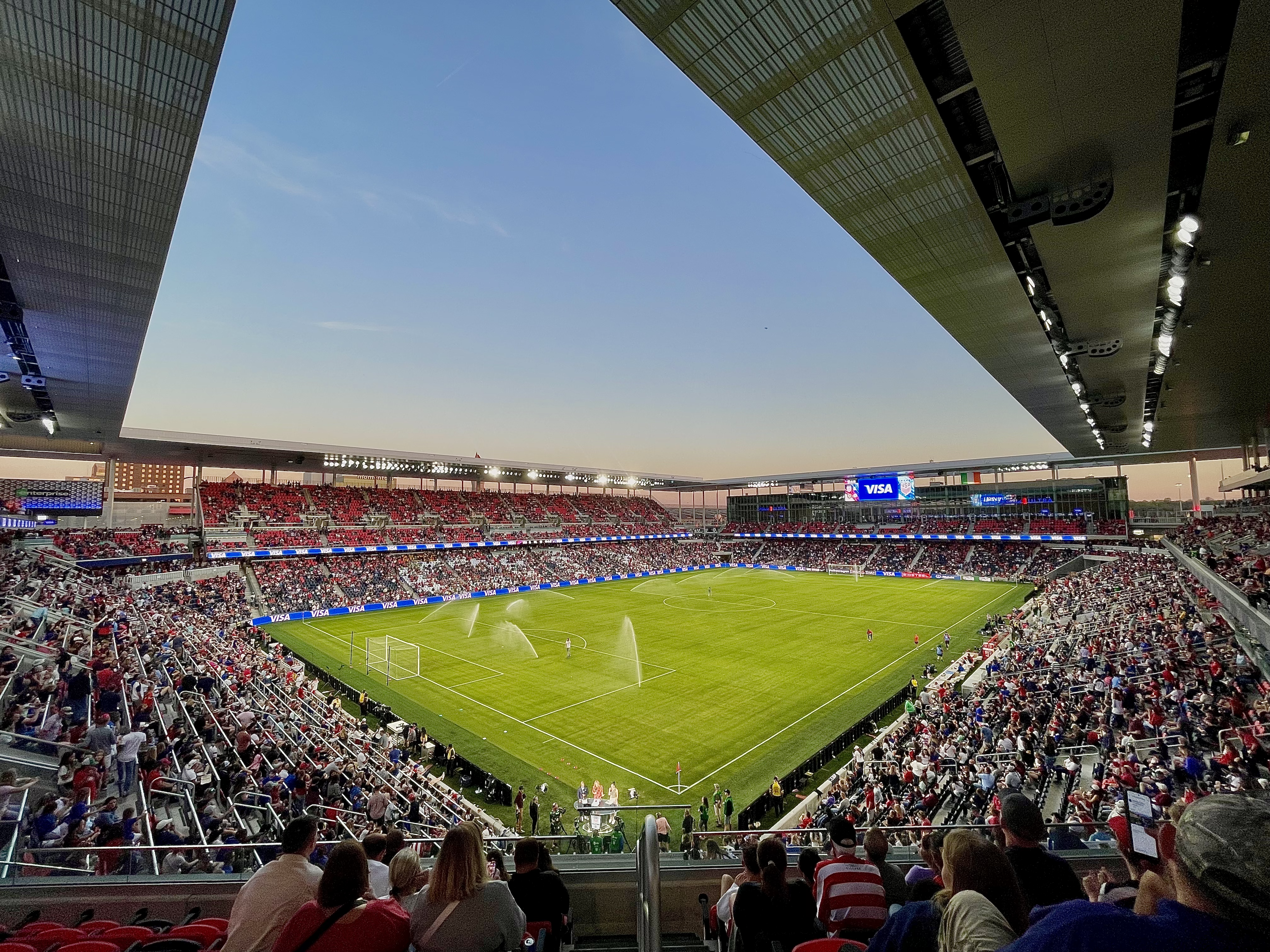
USWNT vs. Ireland at Energizer Park in 2023

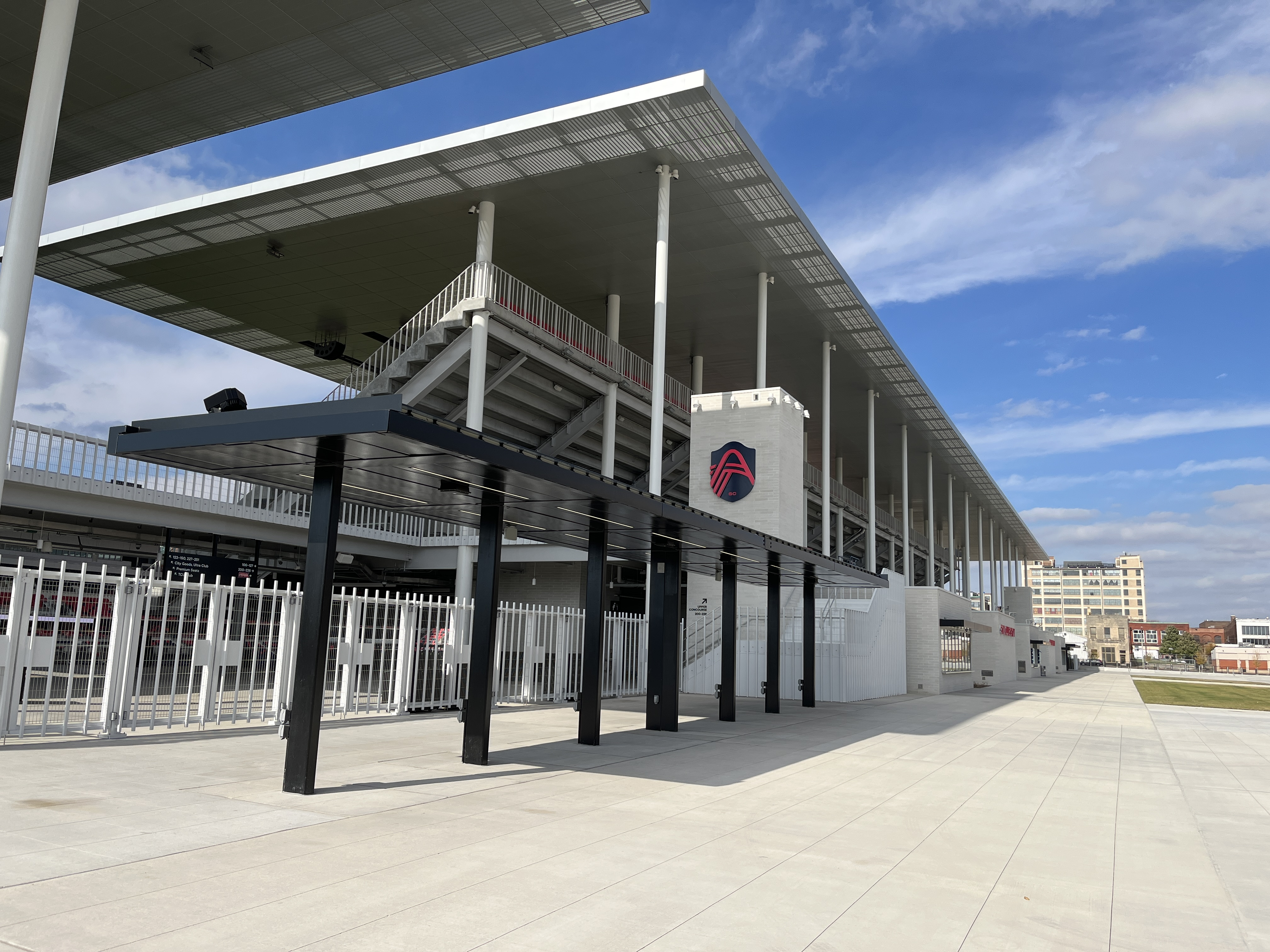
20th and Market entrance

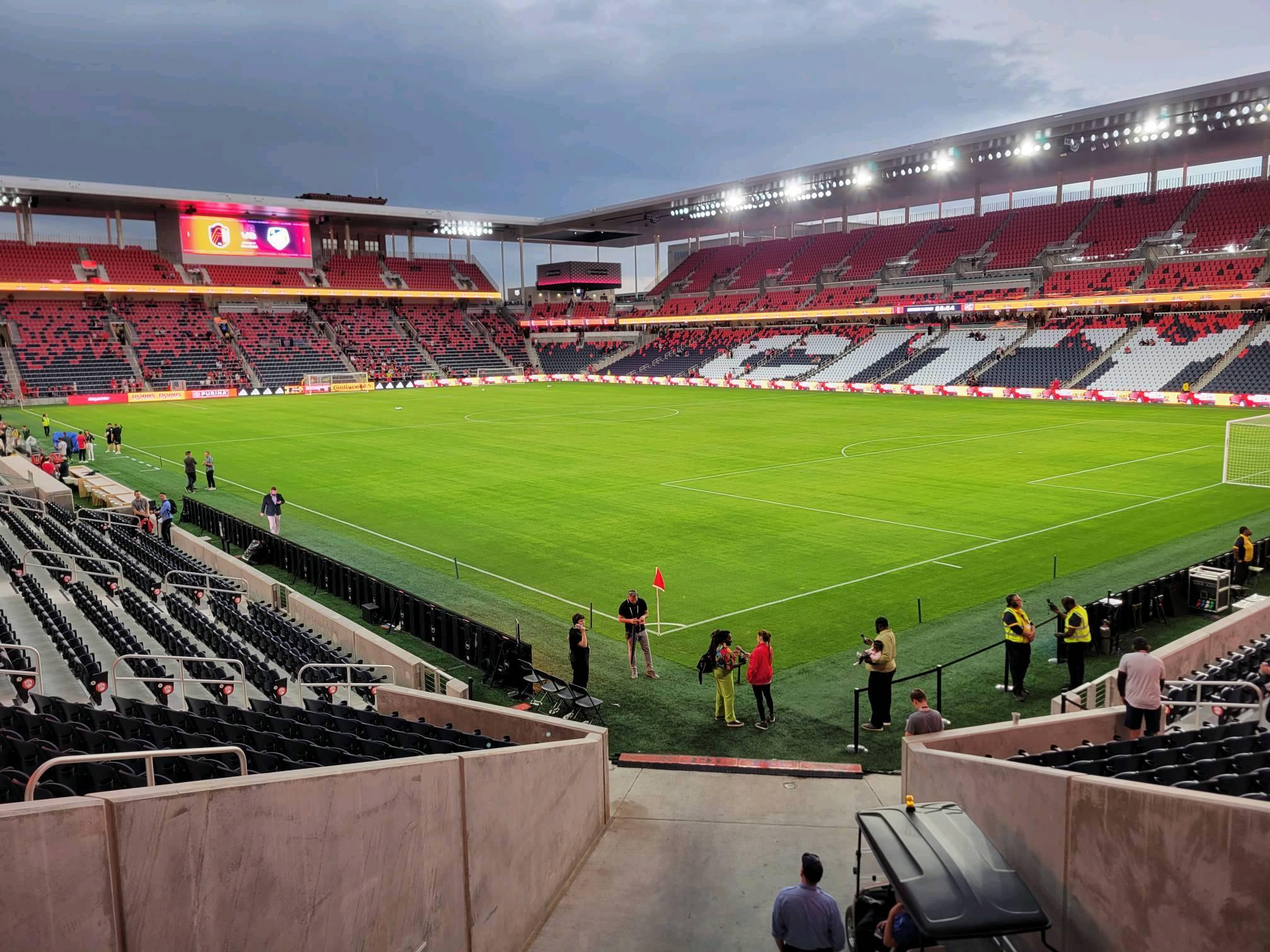
Energizer Park interior

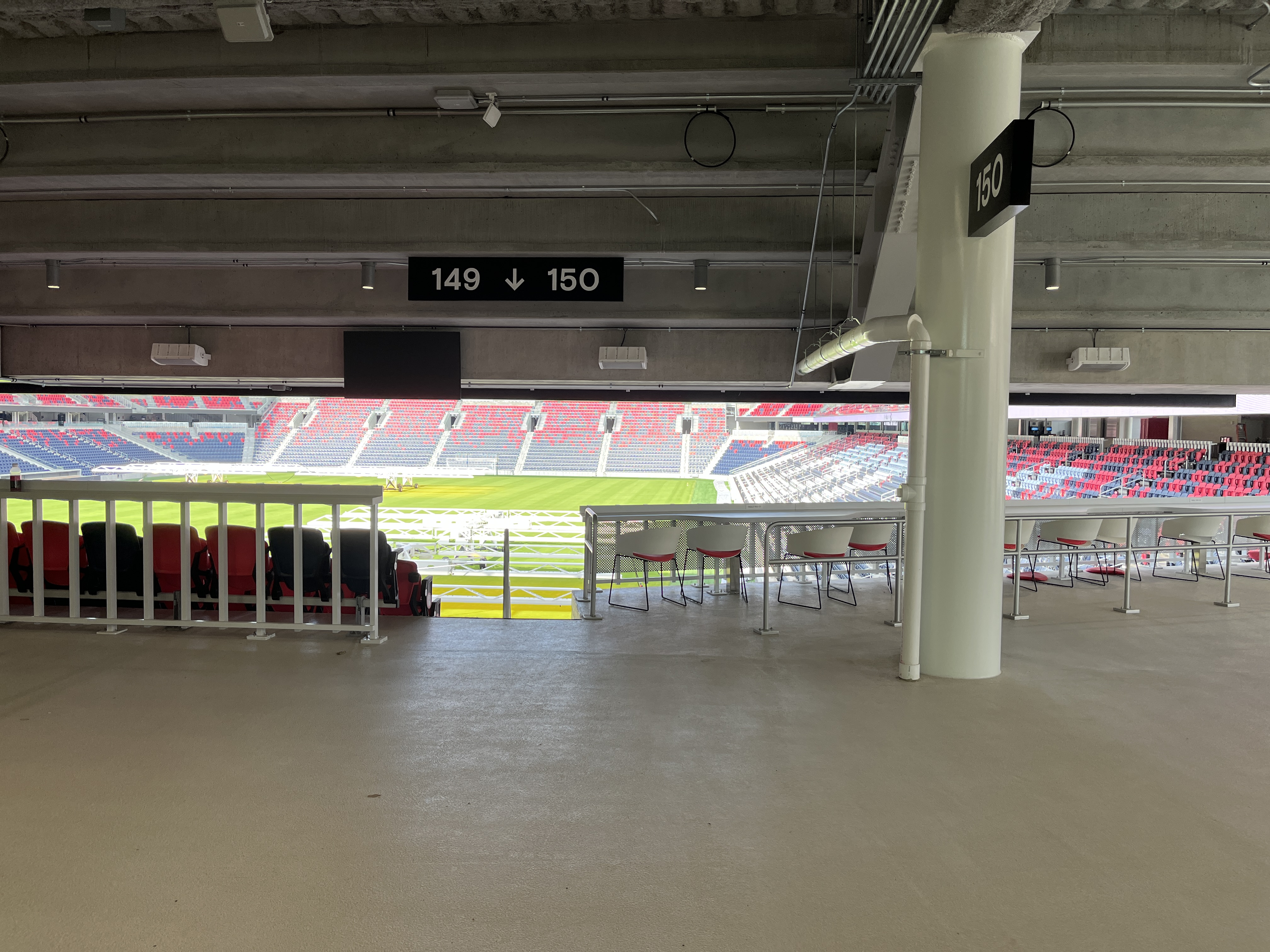
Energizer Park concourse

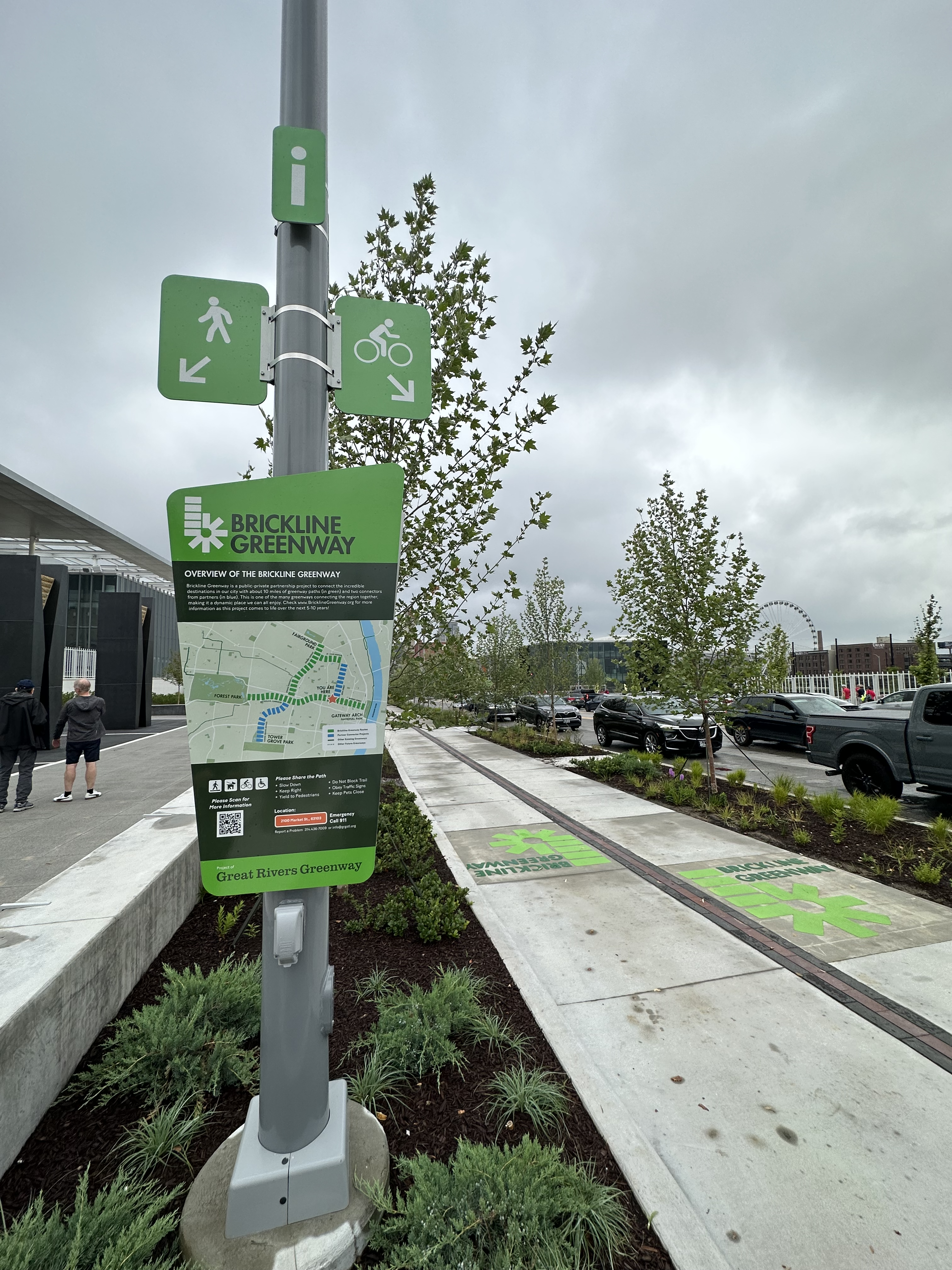
Brickline Greenway signage along Market Street
