= John Braithwaite (engineer) =

English engineer

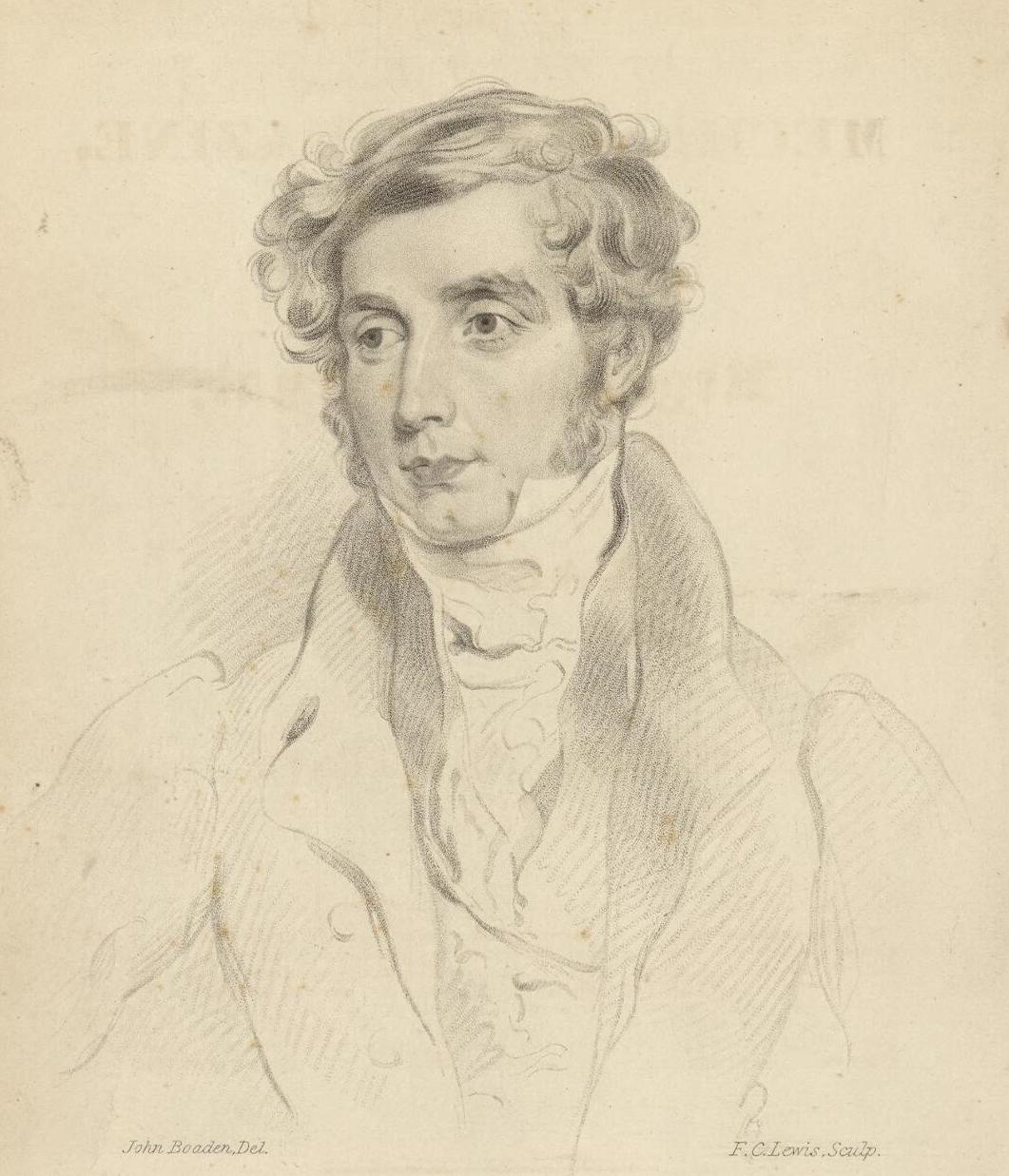
- Born: 19 March 1797; London, England
- Died: 25 September 1870 (aged 73); Paddington, London, England
- Occupations: Engineer, inventor

John Braithwaite, the younger FSA (19 March 1797 – 25 September 1870), was an English engineer who invented the first steam fire engine. He also co-designed the first locomotive claimed to have covered a mile in less than a minute.

== Early life ==
Braithwaite was third son of John Braithwaite the elder. He was born at 1 Bath Place, New Road, London, on 19 March 1797, and, after being educated at Mr. Lord's school at Tooting in Surrey, attended in his father's manufactory, where he made himself master of practical engineering, and became a skilled draughtsman. In June 1818 his father died, leaving the business to his sons Francis and John. Francis died in 1823, and John Braithwaite carried on the business alone. He added to the business the making of high-pressure steam-engines. In 1817 he reported before the House of Commons upon the Norwich steamboat explosion, and in 1820 he ventilated the House of Lords by means of air-pumps. In 1822 he made the donkey engine, and in 1823 cast the statue of the Duke of Kent by sculptor Sebastian Gahagan that was erected in Park Crescent at the northern end of Portland Place in London.

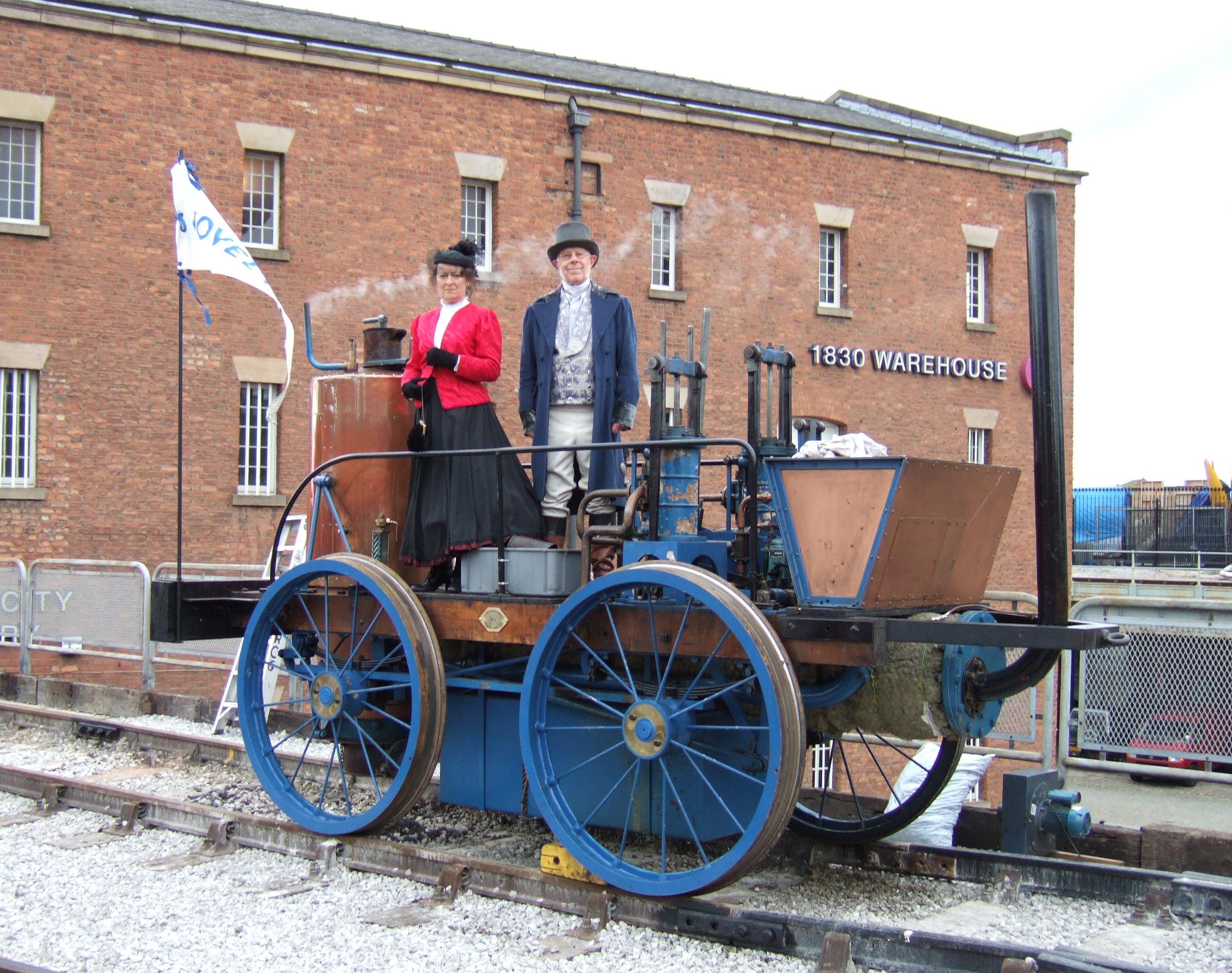
Modern replica of Novelty, with a descendant of Braithwaite aboard

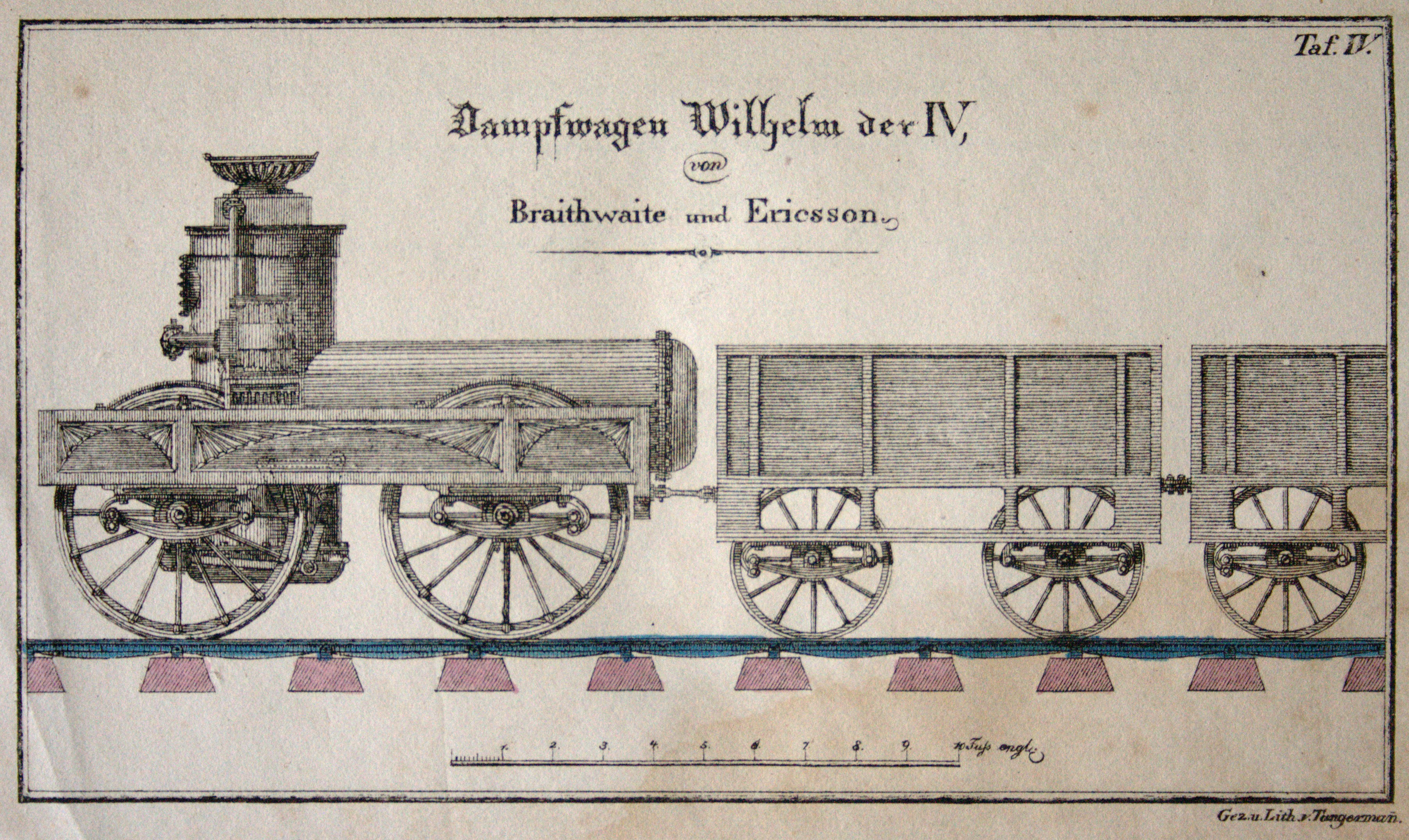
Drawing of a steam locomotive named after William IV

He was introduced to George and Robert Stephenson in 1827, and about the same time became acquainted with Captain John Ericsson, who then had many schemes in view. In 1829 Braithwaite and Ericsson constructed for the Rainhill experiments the locomotive engine, The Novelty. This engine was claimed to be the first that ever ran a mile within a minute (fifty-six seconds); this speed of about 64 mph (103 km/h) is disputed. The maximum achieved at Rainhill was 28 mph (45 km/h).

== Fire-engines ==
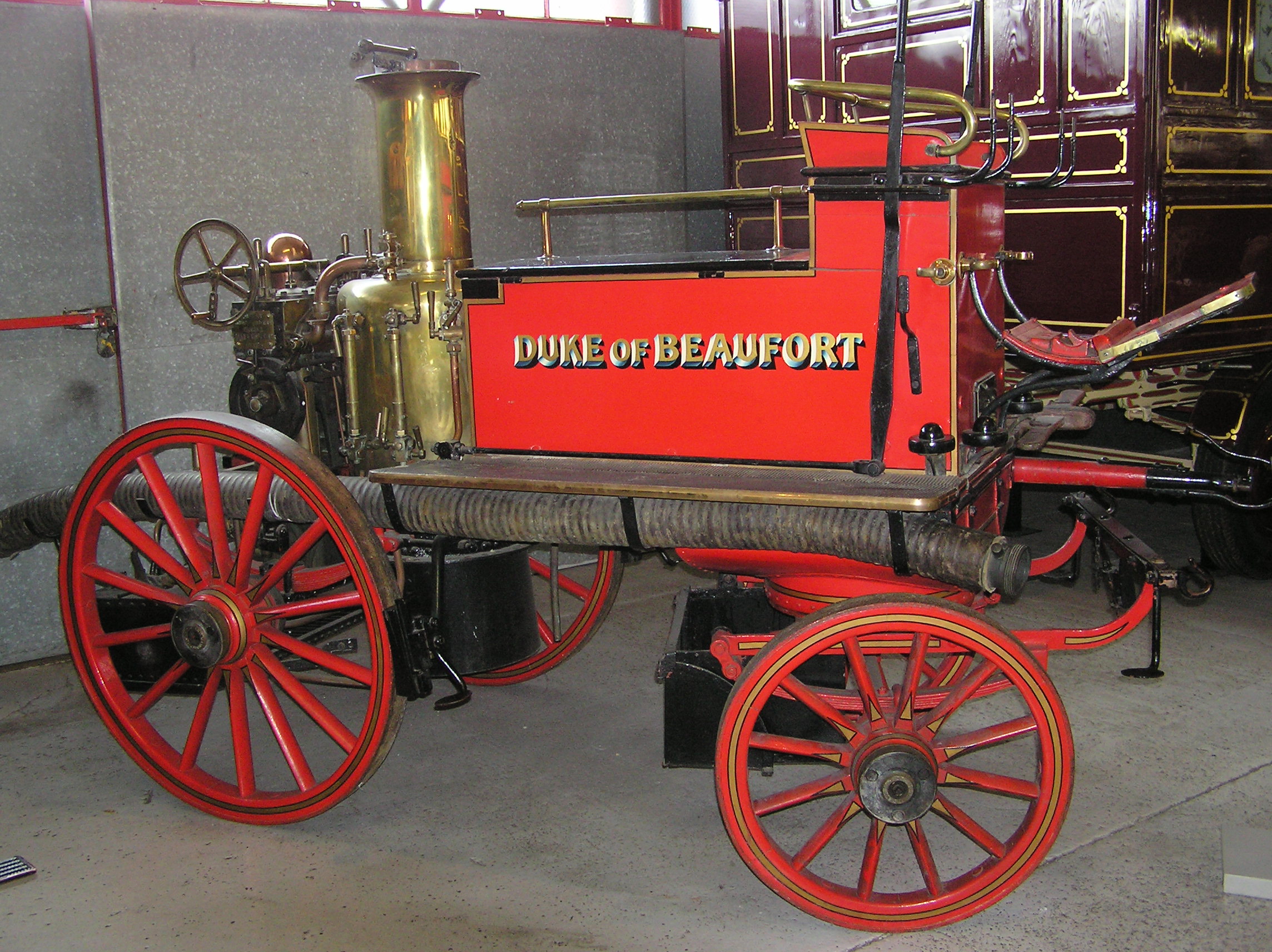
1906 horse-drawn steam fire engine in England. The water is pumped onto the fire by a double-acting onboard steam engine.

At this time Braithwaite manufactured the first practical steam fire engine, which was ultimately destroyed by a London mob. It had, however, previously done good service at the burning of the English Opera House in 1830, at the destruction of the Argyle Rooms 1830, and at the conflagration of the Houses of Parliament in 1834. It threw two tons of water per minute, burnt coke, and got up steam in about twenty minutes; but it was looked upon with so much jealousy by the fire brigade of the day that the inventor had to give it up. He, however, soon constructed four others of larger dimensions, two of which, in Berlin and Liverpool, respectively, gave great satisfaction. In 1833 he built the caloric engine in conjunction with Captain Ericsson.

== Civil engineer ==
In 1834, Braithwaite stopped playing an active role in the management of the engine works at New Road, and began to practise as a civil engineer for public works. He largely consulted on projects, both at home and abroad, particularly related to the capabilities of, and improvements to, locomotives. 1834 also saw Braithwaite plan and lay out the Eastern Counties Railway (ECR) in conjunction with Charles Blacker Vignoles. The railway was formally incorporated in 1836, and Braithwaite was soon after appointed engineer-in-chief of its construction.

At Braithwaite's recommendation, the ECR's gauge was set at 5 ft (1,524 mm), and the line was constructed as far as Colchester to this gauge. The trackbed, however, being made wide enough for the track to be widened to a 7 ft (2,134 mm) gauge. On the recommendation of Robert Stephenson the railways was re-gauged to the emerging "standard gauge" of 4 ft 8 1/2 in (1,435 mm); in later years Braithwaite was an advocate of still narrower gauges. Whilst engineer to the ECR he introduced an American excavating machine and an American steam pile-driving machine. He left the ECR on 28 May 1843.

Braithwaite was joint founder of the Railway Times, which he started with Joseph Clinton Robertson as editor in 1837, and he continued sole proprietor till 1845. He undertook the preparation of plans for the direct Exeter railway, but the Railway Mania of the period, and his connection with some commercial speculations, necessitated the winding up of his affairs in 1845.

== Consulting engineer ==
Braithwaite had, in 1844, a share in a patent for extracting oil from bituminous shale, and works were erected near Weymouth which, but for his difficulties, might have been successful. Some years before, 1836–8, Captain Ericsson and he had fitted up an ordinary canal boat with a screw propeller, which started from London along the canals to Manchester on 28 June 1838, returning by the way of Oxford and the Thames to London, being the first and last steamboat that has navigated the whole distance on those waters. The experiment was abandoned on account of the deficiency of water in the canals and the completion of the railway system, which diverted the paying traffic. In 1844, and again in 1846, he was much on the continent surveying lines of railway in France, and on his return he was employed to survey Langstone Harbour in 1850, and to build the Brentford brewery in 1851. From that year he was principally engaged in chamber practice, and acted as consulting engineer, advising on most of the important mechanical questions of the day for patents and other purposes.

== Honours ==
Braithwaite was elected a fellow of the Society of Antiquaries in 1819, a member of the Institution of Civil Engineers on 13 February 1838, and at the time of his death he was one of the oldest members of the Society of Arts, having been elected into that body in the year 1819; he was also a life governor of seventeen charitable institutions.

== Family ==
John Braithwaite married Caroline, or possibly Caroline Amelia (1803–1878), and together they had at least ten children (six sons and four daughters): Eliza Emma (b. 1824), John (b. 1825), George (b. 1826), Clara Ellen Sophia (b. 1828) Frank (b. 1829), Harriet Frances (b. 1831), Richard Charles (b. 1832), Frederick John (b. 1835), Caroline Anne (b. 1836) and Edward Henry (b. 1838).

John died suddenly at 8 Clifton Gardens, Paddington, on 25 September 1870, and his remains were interred in Kensal Green Cemetery. His wife died in 1878.

== Publications ==
1. Supplement to Captain Sir John Ross's Narrative of a second voyage in search of a North-West Passage, containing the suppressed facts necessary to an understanding of the cause of the failure of the steam machinery of the Victory 1835. To this work Sir J. Ross published a reply in the same year.
2. Guideway Steam Agriculture, by P. A. Halkett, with a Report by J. Braithwaite 1857

== See also ==
- Fatigue (material)
