= Joseph Lister Memorial =

Memorial by Joseph Lister in London

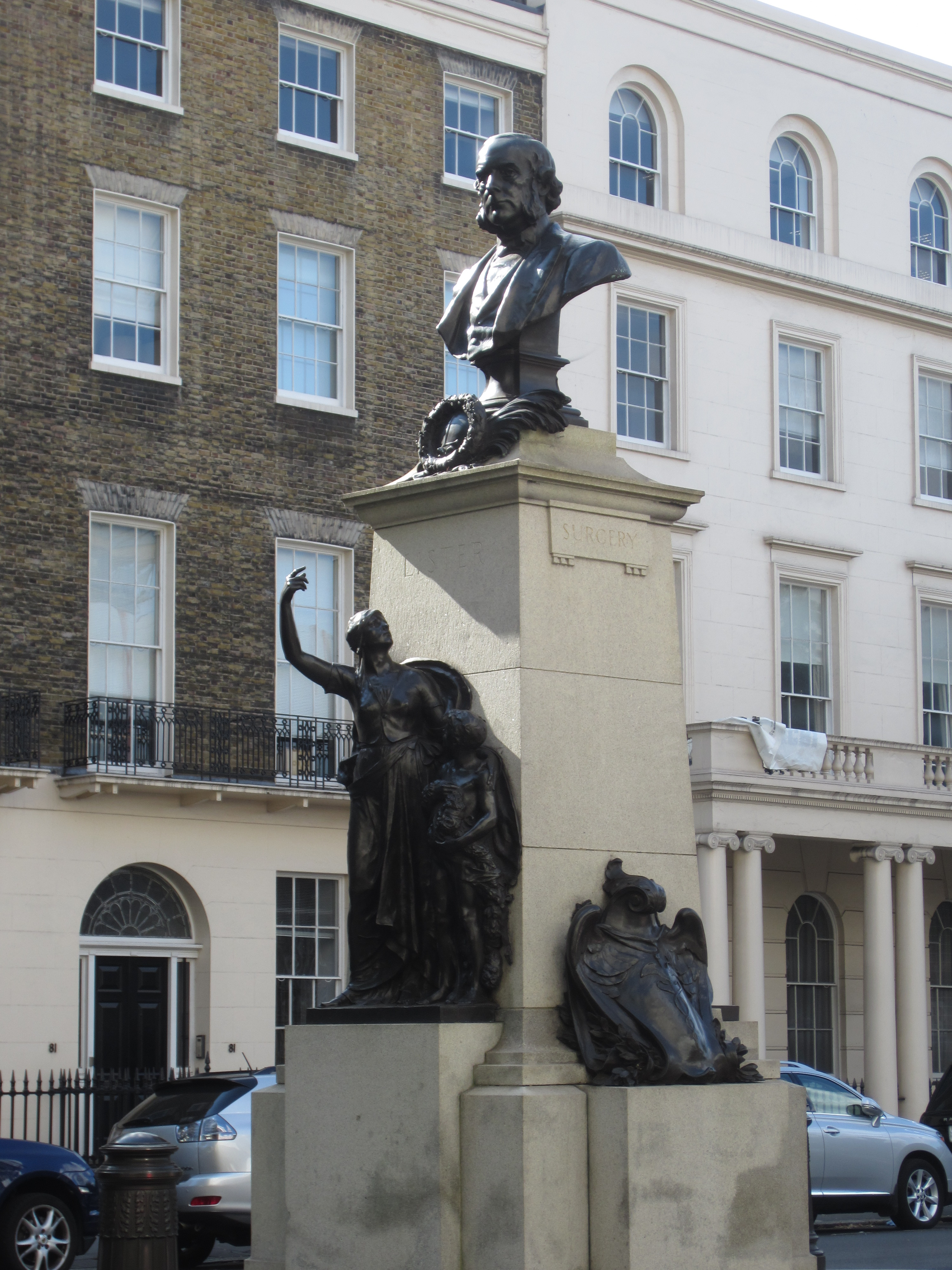
- The memorial in 2014
- Artist: Thomas Brock
- Completion date: 13 March 1924
- Medium: Bronze sculpture; granite (base)
- Subject: Joseph Lister
- Location: London, United Kingdom
- 51°31′21″N 0°08′45″W

The Joseph Lister Memorial is a memorial to Joseph Lister, 1st Baron Lister by the sculptor Thomas Brock, situated in Portland Place in Marylebone, London. The memorial is positioned in the centre of the road opposite numbers 71 to 81 and is Grade II listed. It is close to Lister's home at 12 Park Crescent.

The memorial was unveiled by Sir John Bland-Sutton, President of the Royal College of Surgeons, on 13 March 1924. The base of the monument is made of grey Aberdeen granite. On top of the base is a bronze bust of Joseph Lister. At the front are the figures of a woman and a boy: the boy is holding a garland of flowers; the woman is pointing to Lister with her right hand.

A little way to the north in Park Crescent is the 1824 statue of the Duke of Kent, the father of Queen Victoria.
