= J. G. Bubb =

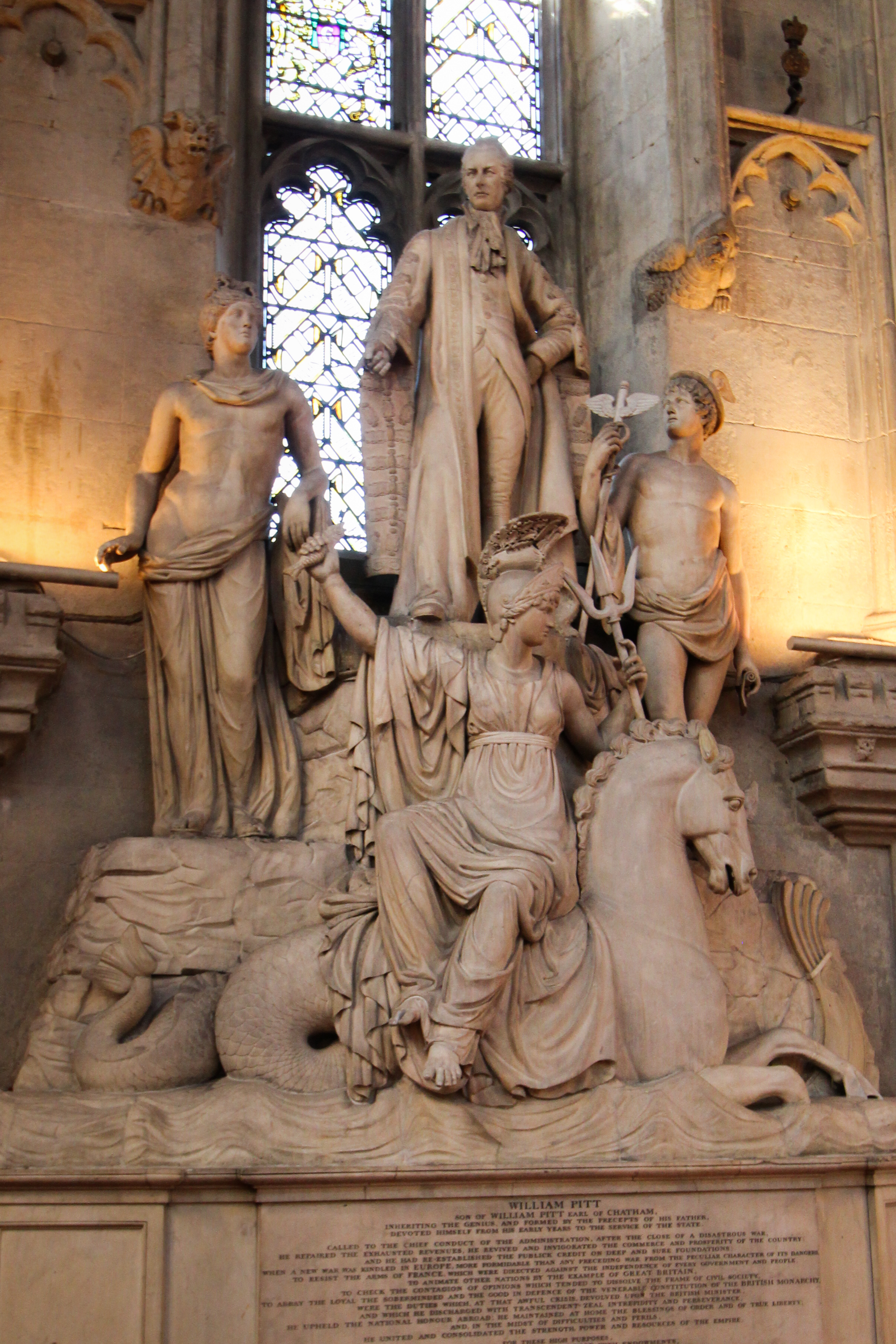
Bubb's monument to William Pitt the Younger in the Guildhall in London

James George Bubb (1781–1853) was a prolific sculptor in marble and artificial stone of the early Victorian era who is now largely forgotten. His sculptures adorn buildings across the United Kingdom whilst his relief adorning the Italian Opera House in London was the largest undertaken in Great Britain at that time.

== Early career ==
Born in London the son of Fanny and James Bubb, a tobacconist with a shop on The Strand, he was probably the James George Bubb who was christened at St Martin-in-the-Fields on 23 September 1781. In 1797, aged 15, Bubb was apprenticed to the sculptor John Fontum for seven years.

Bubb had a prize-winning beginning at the Royal Academy Schools from 1801 and won a silver medal in 1805. Before 1806 he worked in the studio of John Charles Felix Rossi RA and John Bingley; Bingley said that Bubb "did studiously attend to the duties of his profession and was employed in the several works carried on in that period, particularly in marble, viz. Captain Faulkener's monument in St Paul’s". He regularly exhibited his work from his father's tobacco shop as a young man which in 1806 caused Lawrence Gahagan, who lost out on an important commission to Bubb, to describe him disparagingly as "Tobacconist Bubb".

In 1806 while still relatively unknown he secured the commission to sculpt the monument to William Pitt the Younger for the Guildhall in London; the monument was not completed until 1813. Bubb submitted the lowest tender against other more prominent sculptors including Lawrence Gahagan and his former employer John Charles Felix Rossi. Rossi was angered by the choice of Bubb by the Corporation of London believing they had gone for the cheapest option rather than the best and questioned if Bubb was suitably experienced to deliver the monument satisfactorily. When asked for a reference Rossi wrote that as Bubb had not "been employed during his continuance with me upon anything by which he could acquire any practical skill in the execution of such works as the one proposed" he could not "give any opinion as to the executive ability of Mr Bubb". Joseph Farington believed that Bubb had been guilty of sharp practice having "canvassed the Members of the Common Council and gave cards on the back of which he put the mark which he put on his model that it might be known".

== Royal Academy ==
His bust of Horatio Nelson was sculpted in 1810 and was purchased by Nelson's daughter Horatia Nelson before it entered the collection of the National Maritime Museum at Greenwich in 1965. In November 1811 he applied to become an Associate of the Royal Academy in competition with sculptors including William Theed I, Sir Francis Chantrey RA, Peter Turnerelli and John Bacon II. However, the Academicians remembered the scandal surrounding Bubb with regard to the 1806 Guildhall competition and he polled no votes. Among his most notable works were decorative sculptures for buildings including a commission for statues and a bas-relief for the Commercial Rooms in Bristol from about 1811 show his growing skill and ability. He married Margaret Alice Blakey in London in 1812 and after working for Eleanor Coade who had developed Coade stone he honed the skills he learnt from her and embarked on a career working extensively as a modeller using a composition material of his own design, a form of terracotta he named ‘lithargolite’.

In 1818 after the bankruptcy of his terracotta modelling business he and Rossi went into partnership despite their previous antipathy to provide a large number of sculptures for the new Customs House in the City of London for which they used Bubb's composition material ‘lithargolite’. The figures represented the arts and sciences, commerce and industry, and inhabitants of various countries of the world. A clock dial, nine feet in diameter, was supported by colossal figures symbolising Industry and Plenty, and the royal arms by figures of Ocean and Commerce. However, their work was poorly received and within six years the badly-constructed building had been demolished.

== Later years ==
Bubb's statue of St Andrew outside St Andrew's Garrison Church in Aldershot in Hampshire

Bubb again used his terracotta-like composition ‘lithargolite’ for his frieze for the Italian Opera House in the Haymarket which had Apollo and the Muses at its centre, and a carved allegory of the Progress of Music; the fragments which still survive show figures ranging from ancient Egyptian dancers to others in contemporary clothing. This frieze was the largest undertaken in Great Britain at that time. By about this period Bubb had overstretched himself to such an extent that he experienced financial difficulties which forced him to have to borrow heavily so that he could complete the commissions he had in hand. In August 1820 Bubb was declared bankrupt and his premises and kiln were taken over by Joseph Browne who employed him as a modeller and designer. However, such was Bubb's reputation that he continued to obtain important and large commissions for architectural decoration. When the architect Francis Goodwin wished to engage Bubb to create the statues for Manchester Town Hall he described Bubb as "pre-eminent in this country ... in this particular branch of the Arts". The Literary Gazette said of his pediment with 40 figures for Cumberland Terrace that it was "on so large a scale that it is only exceeded in size by that on St Paul’s Cathedral". In 1827 Bubb supplied a frieze in artificial stone of Elizabeth I for the Royal Exchange in London which can now be found at Lime Walk at Hatfield House having been removed there in 1855 after they were taken from the façade of the Royal Exchange after a fire, while in 1829 he proposed to create a sculpture of George Washington in artificial stone for Pennsylvania in the USA.

His statue of St Andrew is positioned outside St Andrew's Garrison Church in Aldershot in Hampshire having been taken there following the closure of the Royal Caledonian School in Bushey in Hertfordshire in the 1990s.

== Decline ==
Bubb exhibited at the Royal Academy in 1830 and 1831 after which his business began to gradually decline leading in 1833 to a sale of his "architectural sculpture, casts &c" which included Zoffany’s 'Life Class at the Royal Academy', which was sold to Joseph Browne. In 1835 he applied to the Artists' General Benevolent Institution (AGBI) for financial relief having had little work during the previous two years. Bubb stated that he was living in poverty and his landlord had seized and sold his stock in lieu of rent while he had a wife and two children to support. Later it was noted that his wife had run off with a young man who had been living with him as a pupil. In 1839 Bubb was employed by John Marriott Blashfield on experimental terracotta work at Canford Magna in Dorset where Sir John Guest was building inexpensive model cottages for agricultural workers. Also in 1839 Bubb produced a statue of Pomona but these are his last known works.

Today Bubb is largely forgotten but when he is remembered it is not favourably, the majority of his major works having since been destroyed or dismembered, while the low opinion of his fellow-sculptors including those who had lost out on commissions to him have given the impression that he was a sculptor of little artistic talent with a reputation for sharp practice. However, Katharine Esdaile was impressed by the remains of Bubb's frieze for the Italian Opera House and in 1929 described him as one of the "Illustrious Obscure" with a "genius for relief".

== Family ==
On 9 May 1812 he married Margaret Alice Blakey, daughter of Henry Blakey of Bush Lane in London. They had a son, Francis Bubb. Sadly his wife eloped with an apprentice who was lodging in their house.
