= Statue of the Duke of Kent =

Statue in London, England

Coordinates: 51°31′23″N 0°08′46″W

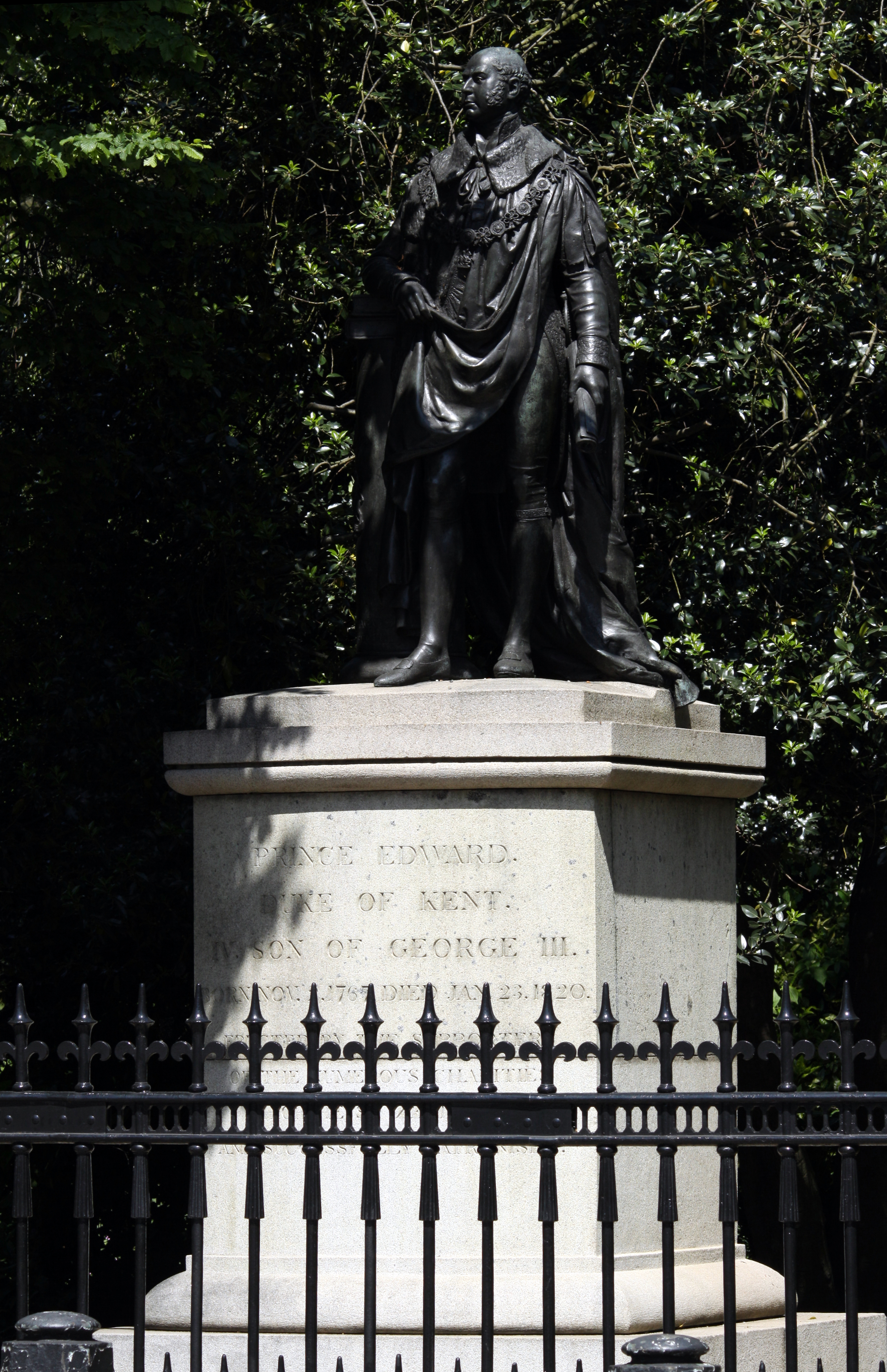
- Artist: Sebastian Gahagan
- Completion date: January 1824
- Medium: Bronze sculpture
- Subject: Prince Edward, Duke of Kent and Strathearn
- Dimensions: 2.18 m (7.16 ft)
- Designation: Grade II
- Location: London, United Kingdom

The statue of the Duke of Kent is a sculpture located in Park Crescent, just south of Regent's Park and at the northern end of Portland Place in Central London. It is on land owned by the Crown Estate in the City of Westminster and was designed by the Irish artist Sebastian Gahagan. It commemorates Prince Edward, Duke of Kent and Strathearn, the fourth son of George III and brother of George IV (who was on the throne when the statue was erected) and William IV, as well as the father of the future Queen Victoria. Installed in January 1824, the statue stands 7 feet 2 inches (2.18 m) high, depicting the Duke in his Field Marshal's uniform and wearing the regalia of the Order of the Garter.

It is made from bronze and is stands on a granite pedestal. It has been Grade II listed since 1970. Gahagan was from a notable family of sculptors and was the son of Lawrence Gahagan. He also served an apprenticeship with Joseph Nollekens. Kent had died in January 1820, eight months after his wife Victoria of Saxe-Coburg had given birth to their only child Princess Victoria. Funds were raised for the memorial statue by various charities with which Kent had been involved, with many of his fellow Freemasons giving money. It was cast by the engineer John Braithwaite.

The statue complemented the grand rebuilding of parts of the West End, particularly the development of Regent Street and Regent's Park (both named after Kent's elder brother, Prince Regent since 1811) and Portland Place by the architects John Nash and Decimus Burton in the fashionable late Georgian style.

Today it is located close to Regent's Park tube station on the London Underground. A much later memorial to the Victorian surgeon Lord Lister was unveiled in 1924 a little way to the south on Portland Place.

== See also ==
- Duke of York Column, a memorial to Kent's brother the Duke of York
- King's Cross, a destroyed memorial to Kent's brother George IV

== Bibliography ==
- Temple, Philip & Thom, Colin & Saint, Andrew. Survey of London: South-East Marylebone: Volumes 51 And 52, Volume 52, Part 2. Yale University Press, 2017.
