= Vincent Gahagan =

Anglo-Irish sculptor

Vincent Gahagan (1776–1831) was a 19th-century sculptor of Irish descent from a large family of sculptors.

== Life ==
He was born in Westminster on 26 October 1776 the son of sculptor Lawrence Gahagan and his wife Phoebe Hunter. He had at least seven siblings most of whom (both male and female) became sculptors, including a younger brother Sebastian Gahagan.

He exhibited at the Royal Academy from 1804 to 1833. In later life he worked as assistant to Richard Westmacott. He came to public (or rather academic) recognition in 1811 when the Count of Funchal, Ambassador to Brazil, came to London to ask the Royal Academy to run a competition for a royal equestrian statue to stand in Rio de Janeiro. By 1813 this had come to a conclusion and Vincent Gahagan was placed joint first with Charles Rossi. However, the ambassador refused to pay the agreed 800 guineas prize money, saying neither artist was suitable. A legal argument followed for two years.

He worked as an assistant and head modeller at Sir Richard Westmacott's studio in Pimlico. It was there that he died on 28 December 1831 while working on a statue of George Canning, which fell and crushed him. He was buried in January 1832.

== Works ==
- Equestrian statue of the Duke of York
- Statue of George Canning

== Family ==
He had a troubled period in early life, losing two wives in quick succession:

On 9 January 1803 he married Elizabeth Agnes Kay at St Pancras Church.

On 28 September 1804 he married Mary Lewis at Marylebone Church.

He lastly married Maria Dupuis, daughter of Louis Lewis Dupuis, on 9 July 1807 at St George's Church on Hanover Square, London. Maria died at Regents Park in 1846.

By his various marriages he was father to at least seven children including Edwin Gahagan who was also a sculptor. Six of his children outlived him.
