= Commercial Rooms, Bristol =

Listed building in Bristol, England

Commercial Rooms
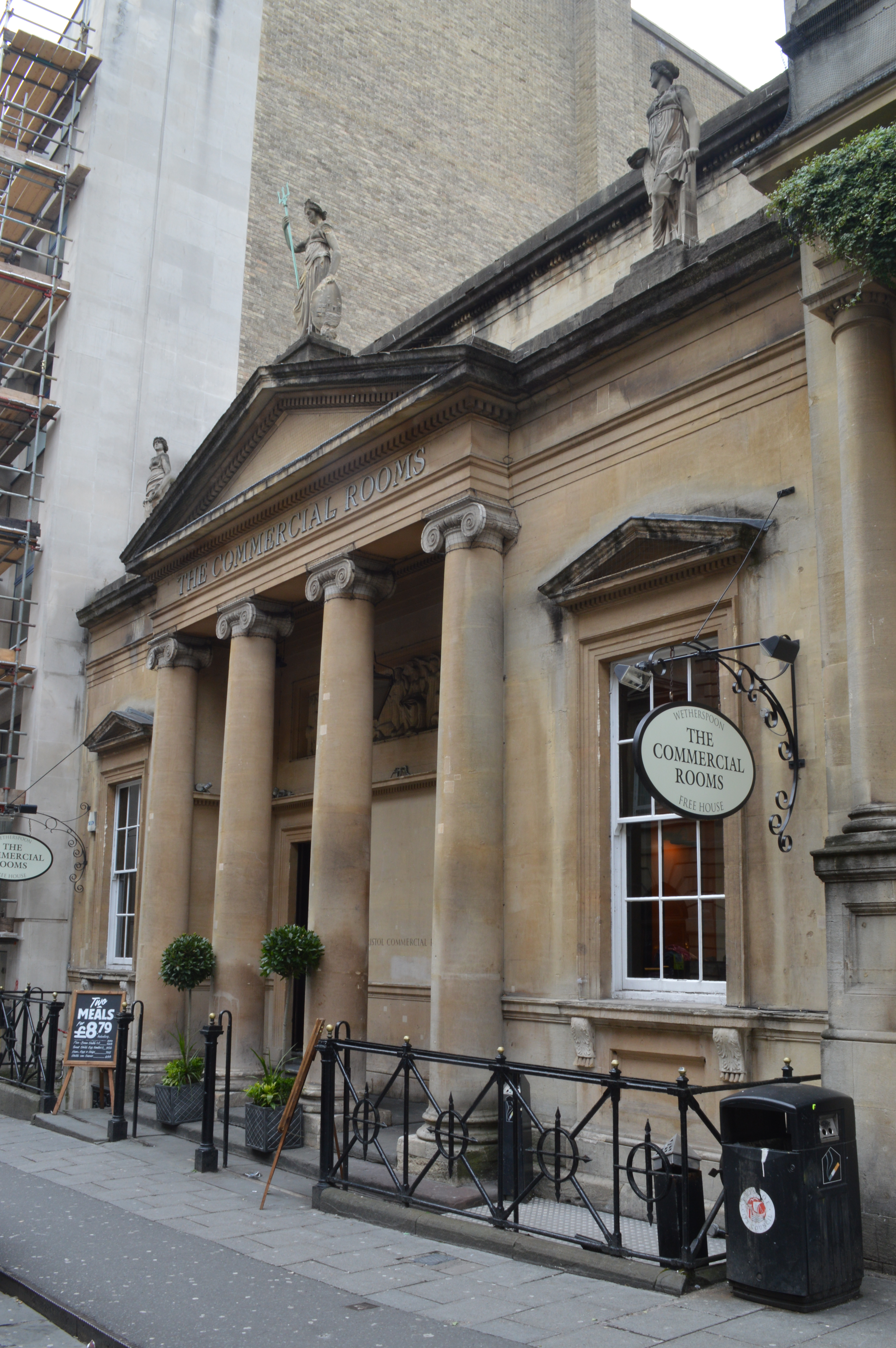
- The Commercial Rooms in 2013

- Location within Bristol

General information
- Location: Bristol, England
- Coordinates: 51.4545°N 2.5945°W
- Year built: 1810

Design and construction
- Architect: Charles Busby

Listed Building – Grade II*
- Official name: Bristol Commercial Rooms and attached area railings
- Designated: 8 January 1959
- Reference no.: 1202152

The Commercial Rooms (grid reference ST587729) are on Corn Street in Bristol, England.

Built in 1810 by Charles Busby, the building has sculpture by J. G. Bubb. Originally it housed a club for mercantile interests and during the mid-19th century it was a haunt of local prostitutes. The retained wind vane above the bar would let merchants know whether it was safe for their ships to negotiate the treacherous Avon Gorge, and the wall boards still contain the names of all the club's presidents, treasurers and secretaries. It is now a pub owned by Wetherspoons.

== History ==
The first formal site for businessmen to meet in Bristol was the Tolzey in 1614 which was built onto the south wall of All Saints' Church. The Exchange was built in 1743, originally for use by all commercial businesses in Bristol but once the Commercial Rooms opened in 1808 the Exchange became the headquarters of the corn trade.

The first president of the Commercial Rooms was John Loudon McAdam, inventor of tarmac, in 1808. The first telegraph office in Bristol was established in the Commercial Rooms in 1852 with a telegraph line out to Shirehampton so that the messenger announcing ships entering the Bristol Channel no longer had to ride by horseback into the city. After the Bristol Blitz in the Second World War conservation and restoration work was needed inside and out due to bomb damage, including recreating the head of one of the statues on the roof.

In 1951 the Great Room featured a 'tape machine' which fed stocks and shares information to the room. In summertime this machine was also used to broadcast cricket scores.

The building has been designated by English Heritage as a Grade II* listed building.

== Archives ==
Records of the Commercial Rooms are held at Bristol Archives (Ref. 20164) (online catalogue 1) (Ref. 37454) (online catalogue 2), (Ref. 41504) (online catalogue 3), (Ref. 44059) (online catalogue 4), (Ref. 44759) (online catalogue 5).

== Architecture and decoration ==
The portico is of the Grecian Ionic order, with the three statues above personifying the City, Commerce and Navigation. Above the entrance is a relief showing Britannia, Minerva and Neptune receiving gifts from earth.

== See also ==
- Grade II* listed buildings in Bristol
