= Park Square, London =

Garden square in London

Coordinates: 51.524°N 0.147°W

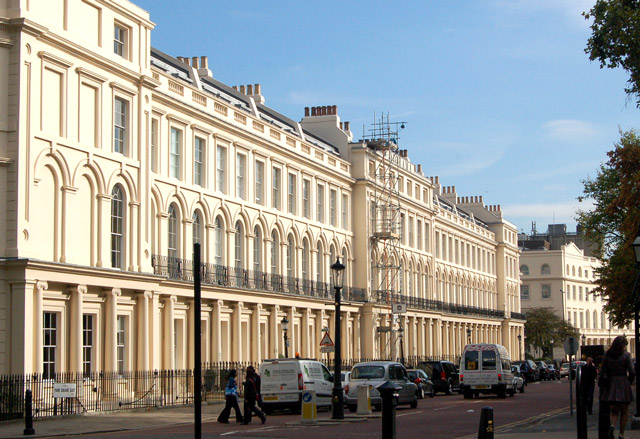
East side. Terrace of: 1 St Andrew's Place (12 to 23) Park Square East 1 Albany Terrace

Crop of Christopher and John Greenwood's 8 inch-to-mile map published in 1827 from an 1830 republication (click to view all).

Park Square is a large garden square or private appendix to Regent's Park in London and is split from a further green, the long northern side of Park Crescent, by Marylebone Road and (single-entrance) Regent's Park tube station. It consists of two facing rows of large, very classically formed, stuccoed, terraced houses with decorative lower floor balconies and a colonnade of consecutive porticos by architect John Nash, and was built in 1823–24. Alike, shorter-length terraces flank its corners at right angles, equally Grade I listed buildings: Ulster Terrace, Ulster Place, St Andrew's Place and Albany Terrace.

Park Square Gardens at centre are private communal grounds for residents. Fronting the north side is the traffic-calmed Outer Circle (road) of Regent's Park. The square is in the Marylebone historic parish addition to the City of Westminster save for the eastern side: in Camden (more particularly, its dominant Saint Pancras historic parish).

On the east side of the square was Britain's first and longest-lasting of four national exhibitions of the Diorama, the building of which remains, in other use – it opened from 1823 until 1852. North-east beyond much smaller St Andrews Place, about twice the Diorama's size, was London Colosseum, built for the largest painting ever made and which was demolished in 1874 – both had large foyers and attracted many visitors.

Unusually it has eight buildings within it, omitting which space, the garden added to east and west sides' roads and footways spans 2.5 hectares (6.2 acres); and the span is 218 metres between the two built-up sides. The gardens are owned by the Crown Estate which keeps four of the internal buildings. It opens to the public a few times per year for London Gardens Squares Weekends. It is dominated by plane trees. The first set were planted in 1817 to celebrate the peace won by the Battle of Waterloo in 1815. Also of interest is a tulip tree, Liriodendron tulipifera.

== Classical pedestrian tunnel for residents ==
An 1821-built feature in the garden is the "Nursemaids' Tunnel", a private, communal pedestrian tunnel, rare in today's Inner London boroughs, privately linking the gardens with those of Park Crescent. Its portals are well-executed in stucco, each with fluted Doric columns flanking the arched entrances. The tunnel has groin vaults supported by brick pilasters and concave walls. The busy road was considered dangerous, especially to children who were often taken to the park by a nursemaid, leading to the wealthy to-be residents petitioning for its building.

== Statutorily protected features ==
In the highest, rarest level of listed building are both built-up sides. In the east all but the end houses comprise "Park Square East" (yet numbered 13 to 24 to avoid any confusion with 1 to 12 "Park Square West"). This exclusion of ends from the street's own numbering is mirrored on the other side. The latter likewise is Grade I-listed. The four corner houses project slightly, and co-front shorter terraces yet their design is highly similar by Nash, and of the same date. Those short perpendicular rows are recognised and protected with the same (Grade I) status: Ulster Terrace, Ulster Place, St Andrew's Place and Albany Terrace.

Two small garden-keeping buildings are listed in the extreme southern corners, the garden-surrounding railings and 18 street lamps. All in the mainstream, initial category, grade II.

Non-listed similar-size buildings comprise those in the northern angles: 12 Park Square East; 13 Park Square West sharing classical architectural façades, built with less expensive labour and materials.
