= John Braithwaite the elder =

John Braithwaite the elder (1760–1818), was a British engineer, and salvor.

John Braithwaite the younger was his son.

== Life ==
Braithwaite is best known as the constructor of one of the earliest successful forms of diving bell. In 1783 he descended in one of his own construction into the wreck of the Royal George, which had gone down off Spithead in the August of the previous year, and recovered her sheet anchor and many of her guns. In the same year, and by the same means, he recovered a number of guns sunk in the Spanish flotilla off Gibraltar.

In 1788, again he made a descent to the wreck of the Hartwell, an East Indiaman, lost off Boa Vista, one of the Cape Verde islands, and recovered dollars to the value of £38,000, 7,000 pigs of lead, and 360 boxes of tin.

In 1806, he raised from the Abergavenny, an East Indiaman, lost off Portland, £75,000 worth of dollars, a quantity of tin, and other property to the value of £30,000, and successfully blew up the wreck with gunpowder.

For these purposes, in addition to perfecting the actual diving apparatus, he devised machinery for sawing ships asunder under water. His ancestors had carried on a small engineers' shop at St Albans since 1695. His own engineering works were in the New Road, London.

== Legacy ==
Braithwaite died in June 1818 at Westbourne Green from the effects of a stroke of paralysis. His business was afterwards carried on by his two sons, Francis and John.
