= Park Crescent West ice well =

- Location within Greater London
- 51.5223°N 0.1470°W
- Type: Ice well
- Location: City of Westminster, England
- OS grid reference: TQ 28654 82004

History
- Built: 1780
- Built by: Samuel Dash
- Abandoned: Mid-to-late 19th century

Site notes
- Material: Brick
- Height: 9.5 m (31 ft)
- Diameter: 7.5 m (25 ft)
- Archaeologists: Museum of London Archaeology
- Discovered: 2014
- Condition: Extant
- Public access: Limited access

Scheduled monument
- Official name: A subterranean commercial ice-well (City of Westminster), Park Crescent West, W1
- Designated: 28 October 2015
- Reference no.: 1427239

The Park Crescent West ice well is a 9.5m deep underground brick structure in the City of Westminster, London, England. It was built by Samuel Dash in 1780 for the storage of ice gathered from local ponds and canals. The structure came into the ownership of William Leftwich, a leading figure in the London ice trade, who used it to store imported Norwegian ice which he sold to the food and drinks industry. The well was abandoned in the mid-to-late 19th century and covered over. It was rediscovered in good condition during development works in 2014. The well was listed as a scheduled monument in 2015 and there are plans to make it available for visits by the general public.

== Description ==
The ice well is a 9.5m deep and 7.5m wide egg-shaped underground structure originally used for the storage of ice. It is situated in the City of Westminster between the John Nash properties of Park Crescent West and buildings on Portland Place. The site, just south of Regent's Park, is now one of London's most desirable areas.

The structure was built of bricks with a London Clay lining, though the top metre of the structure was coated in a cement render and may have originally protruded from the ground. The brickwork, laid in English bond, is of a higher standard than that of the surrounding buildings. The main internal chamber may have originally been subdivided and access and ventilation was provided by a 650mm square hole at the top of the chamber, through which ice would have been raised and lowered. The ice was insulated with hay and a drain was provided at the base of the chamber for the removal of meltwater. An above-ground entranceway, 1.3m wide and roofed with Yorkstone slabs, provided access to the chamber by means of a timber door. A side room off this entranceway may have been used as a vault for the storage of perishable goods.

== History ==
Ice wells or ice houses have been constructed in England since the 1600s as a means of preserving ice gathered from lakes and rivers in winter until the summer months. Most of the structures known today are located at country houses. In 1780 Samuel Dash of Harley Street, who rented land in Park Crescent West, requested permission from his landlord – the Surveyor General of Woods, Forests, Parks, and Chases – to construct an underground "arch". This structure is presumed to have been the ice well. Dash has no documented links to the sale of ice or any associated trades such as fish, pastry or ice cream but was a partner in a distillery. Dash's ice was sourced from local ponds and canals but did not prove very popular as it contained foreign bodies.

The well had been taken over by William Leftwich by early 1826. Leftwich was a pastry chef, confectioner and caterer who was a pioneer of the ice trade in London. He imported 300 tons of high-quality Norwegian ice to London in 1822 and by 1825 was selling this and ice from local sources (including Regent's Canal) to London and the surrounding countryside. His customers included coffee houses, inns, clubs, fishmongers and pastry chefs; he also sold his own ice-based confectionery. Archaeologists suggest that Leftwich may also have supplied local medical practices and dentists on Harley Street and Wimpole Street, where ice was used to numb the skin prior to operations. Leftwich claimed in an 1828 advertisement to sell the "best and clearest" ice in London. He had outlets at Fleet Street and in Kingston upon Thames. Leftwich acquired a larger ice well in Regent's Park in 1829 but seems to have retained the Park Crescent well for some time (though it was definitely out of his possession by his death in 1841). Ice houses in general became redundant with the rise of refrigerators in the late 19th century; many were demolished or re-purposed for general storage or as wine cellars.

== Rediscovery ==
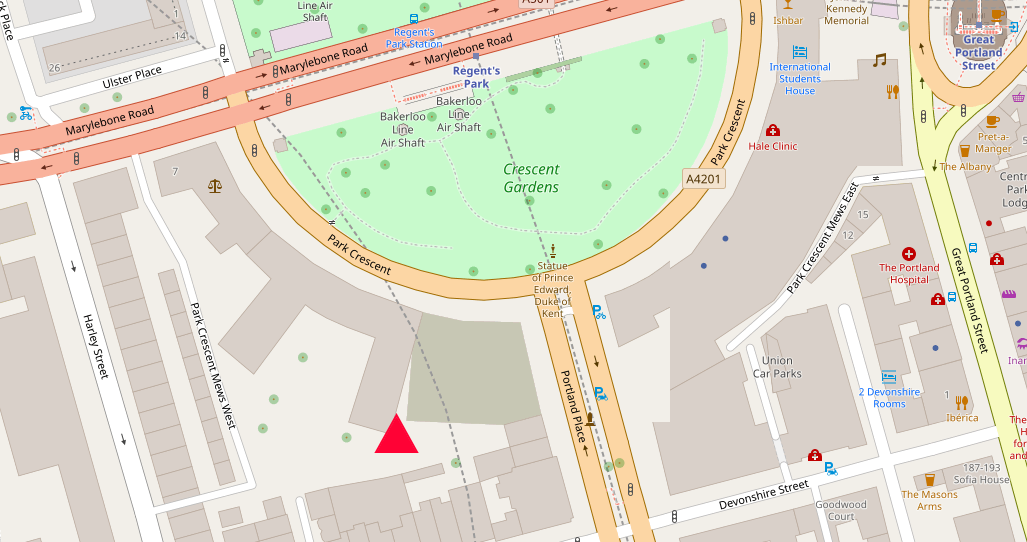
Approximate location of an 18th-century ice well behind Park Crescent West, London; the well is marked with a red triangle.

The well was covered over during the construction of mews on the site in the mid-to-late 19th century and brick walls were laid on top of it. The surrounding houses were destroyed by German bombing during the Blitz but the well was undamaged. It was described as part of the mews property leased for use as a garage as late as 1952 but was lost by 1961 when it was briefly uncovered during construction works before being covered over once more with rubble.

The site was being redeveloped in 2014 as part of a £500 million scheme by Great Marlborough Estates, and they commissioned a survey by the Museum of London Archaeology. This uncovered the ice well which was found to be in a good condition. Historic England described the find as "a spectacular new discovery, astonishingly well-preserved and demonstrating the great engineering and construction abilities present towards the end of the 18th century" and it was noted to be "a rare example of a large, well-preserved urban ice-well". The structure was listed as a scheduled monument on 28 October 2015.

Full excavation of the rubble took three months, though further excavations may allow more of the entrance passageway to be exposed. It was also found that part of the London Underground's Jubilee Line passes beneath the eastern portion of the well. Historic England and the developer have plans to install a corridor above the well that will allow for occasional viewing by the public.
