= Stephen Geary =

British architect (1797–1854)

Stephen Geary (31 August 1797 – 28 August 1854) was a British architect, inventor, entrepreneur, and, from 1850, Temperance activist.

== Early life ==
Geary was born in Dean's Yard, Westminster, London, on 31 August 1797. At the age of 13 he was apprenticed to the architect Thomas Leverton. In 1817 he joined the Royal Academy architecture schools. He exhibited drawings and models at the Royal Academy on six occasions.

== Cemetery work ==
His best known work was Highgate Cemetery, opened in 1839, and later to be his resting place, where he designed the Egyptian Avenue and the Terrace Catacombs: he was also founder of the London Cemetery Company, established by Act of Parliament in 1836, which owned Highgate Cemetery and Nunhead Cemetery.

He is also associated with Gravesend, Nunhead and Brompton Cemeteries and produced a design for a Brighton cemetery that was never built.

== Other works ==
- St Pancras Collegiate School, London. Designed but not built.
- A short-lived monument, consisting of a building, with a statue of King George IV on top (it was erected in 1836, the statue was demolished in 1842, the building in 1845), that gave its name to Kings Cross.
- Gin palaces. Geary was noted in his day for designing gin palaces. Only one is known to survive, The Bell in Pentonville Road. He is reputed to have designed the first gin palace in London (around 1829), although that accolade is usually given to the gin palace built for wine merchants Thompson & Fearon in Holborn (1829–1832) and was designed by John Buonarotti Papworth (the building no longer exists).

== Legacy ==
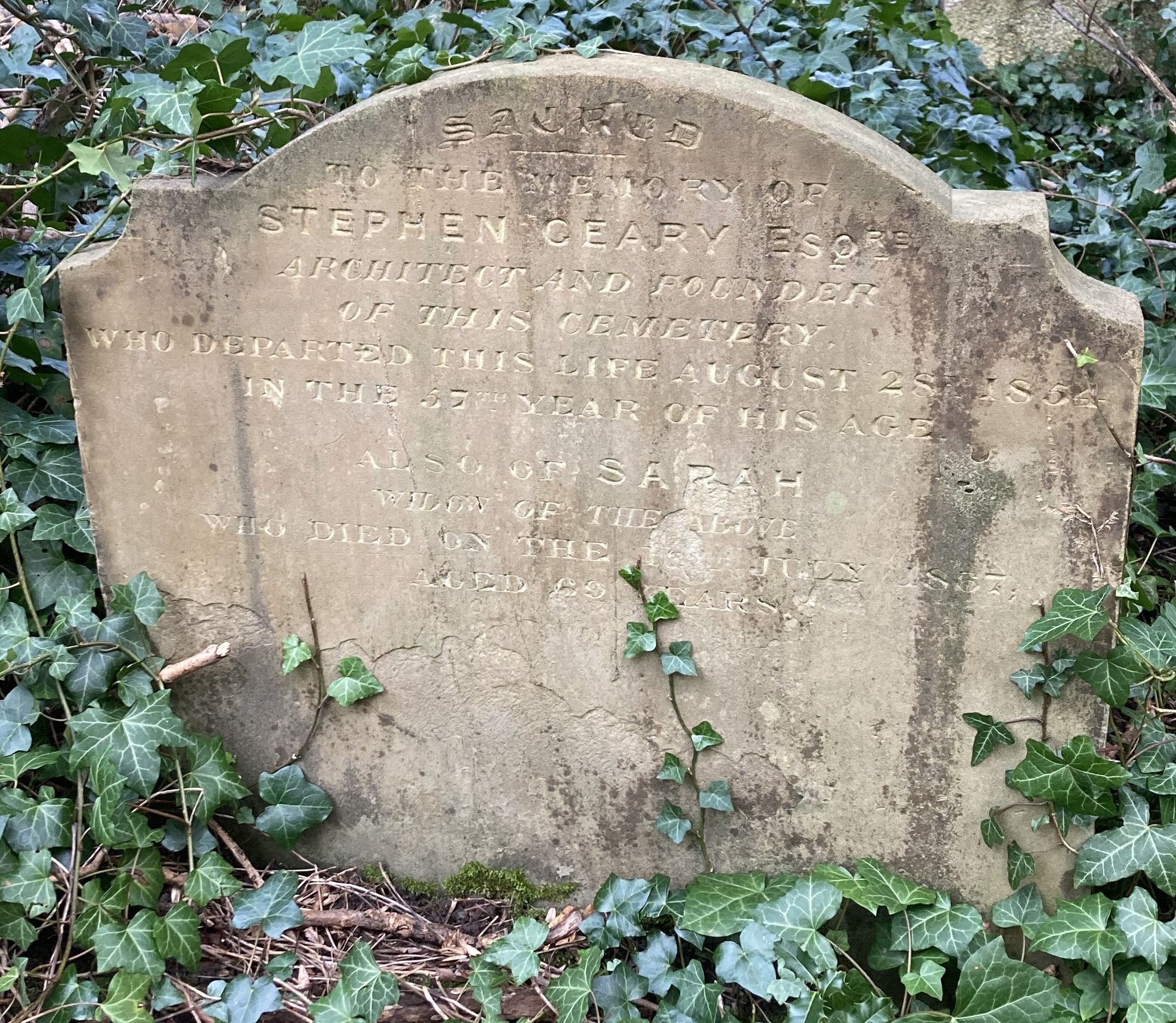
The grave of Stephen Geary on the west side of Highgate Cemetery

Geary's grave in Highgate Cemetery (west side), is located to the east of the main path between Comforts Corner and the Egyptian Avenue. The small headstone is a Grade II listed object.

== Gallery ==
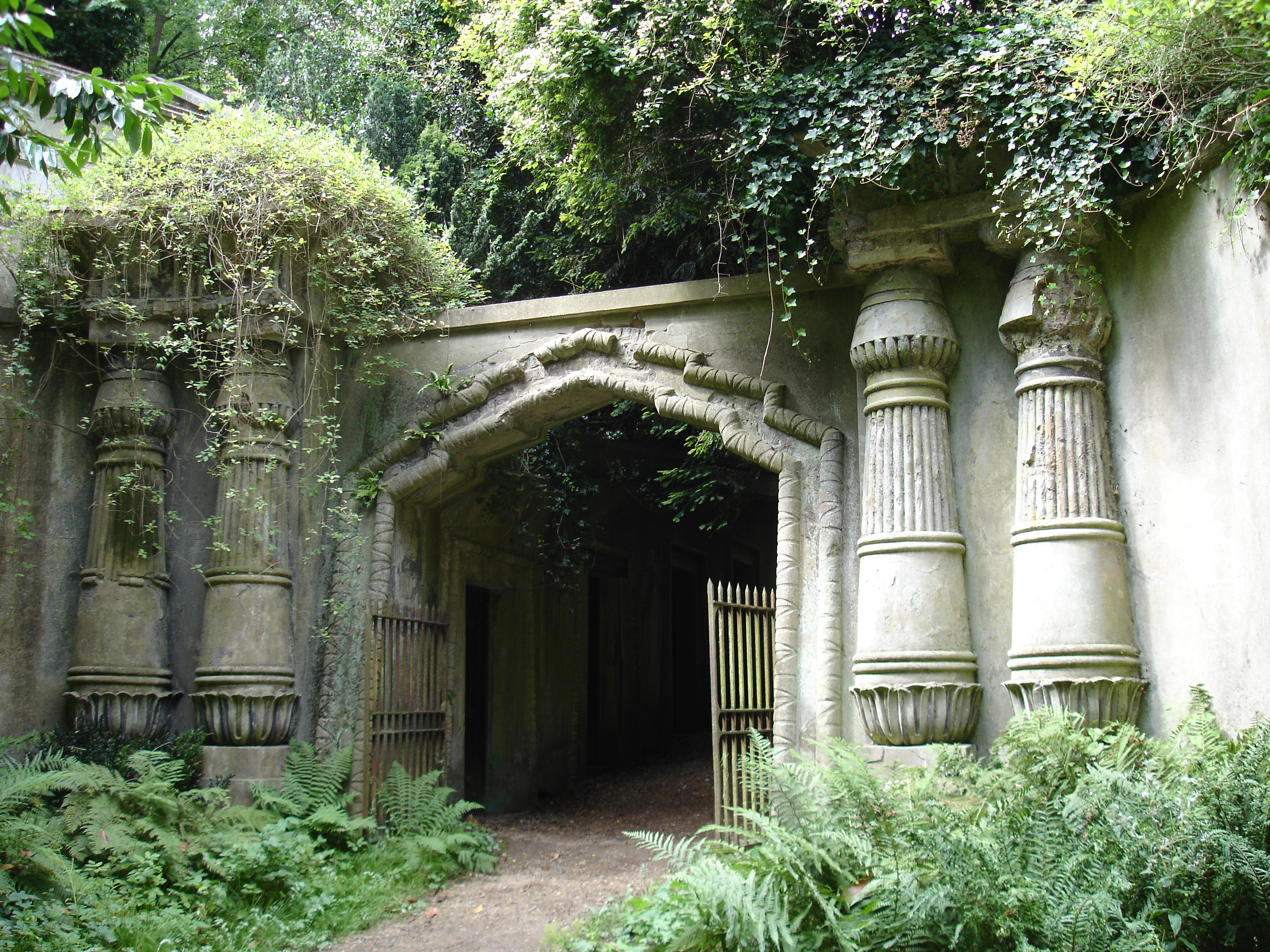
The Egyptian Avenue in Highgate Cemetery (west side) designed by Stephen Geary

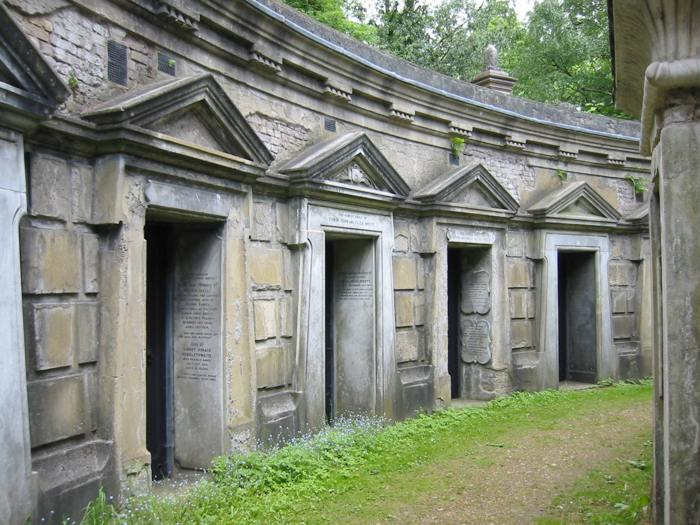
Part of the Circle of Lebanon in Highgate Cemetery (west side) designed by Stephen Geary

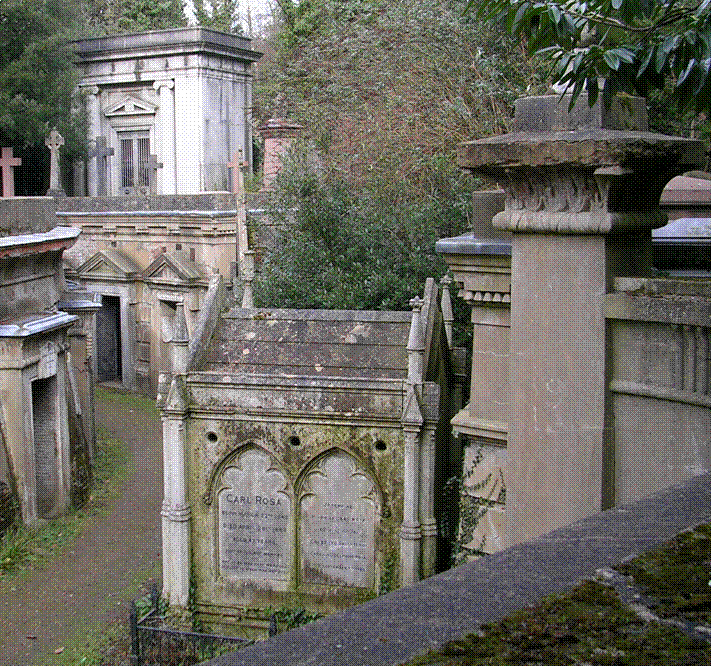
View of the Circle of Lebanon in Highgate Cemetery (west side) taken from above the Egyptian Avenue

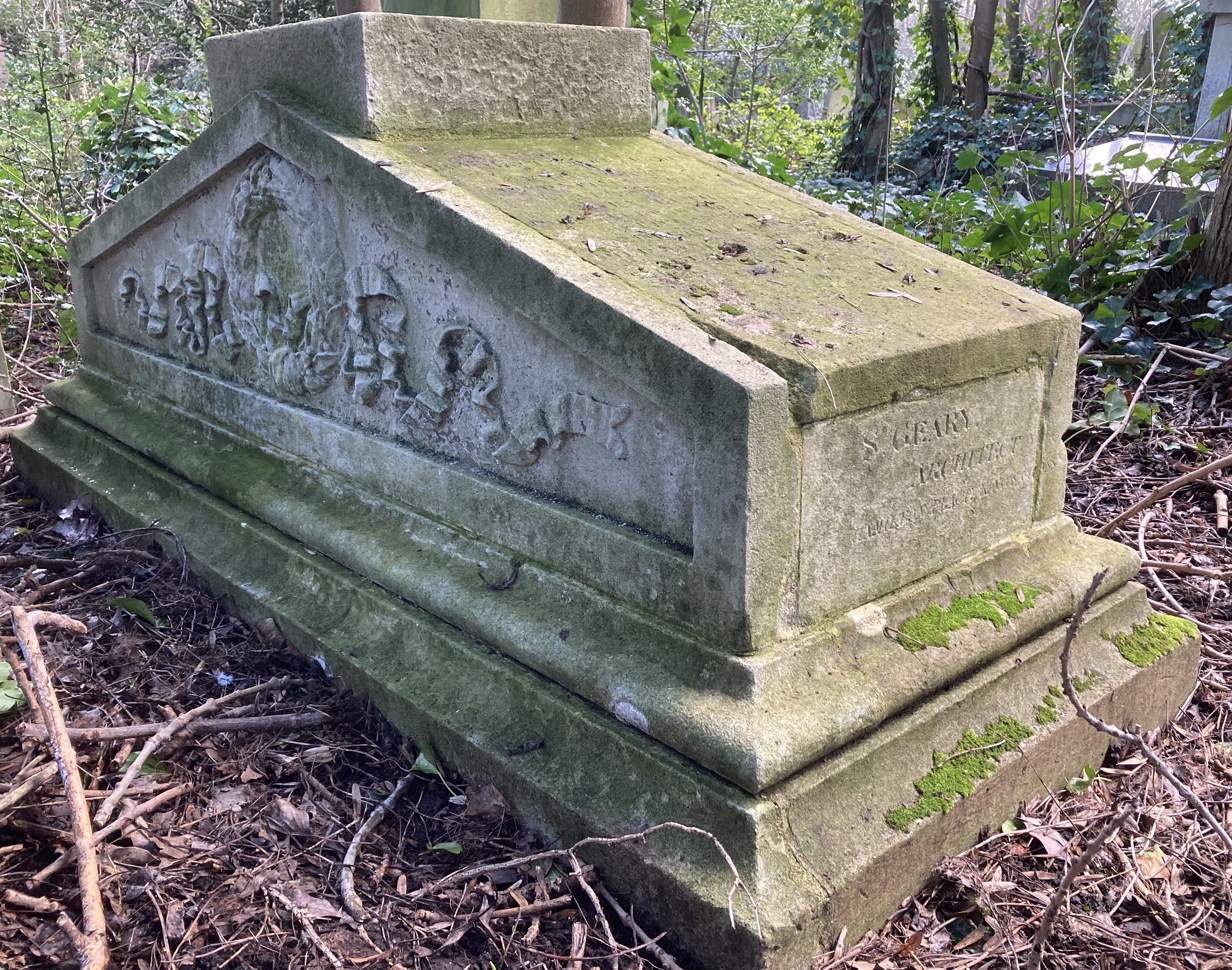
A grave memorial in Highgate Cemetery (west side) designed by Stephen Geary, Architect

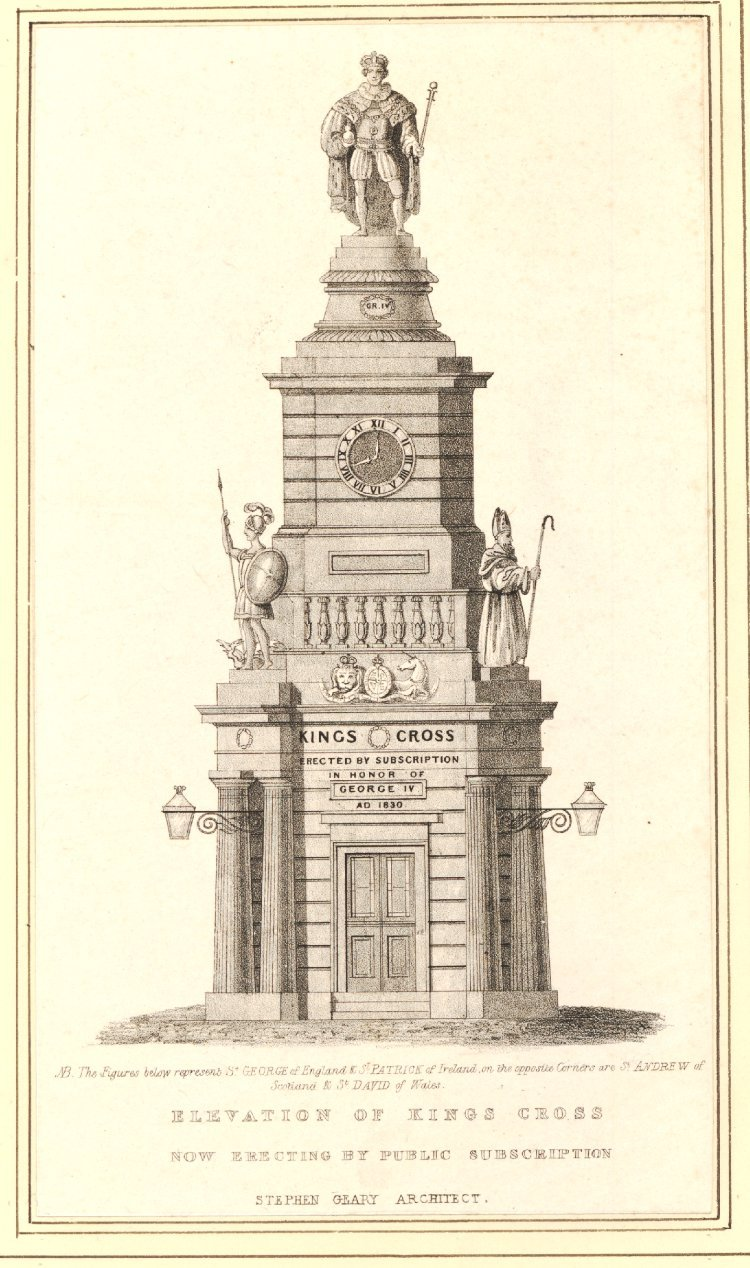
Design for the Kings Cross monument to King George IV

== Bibliography ==
- Cemetery Designs for Tombs and Cenotaphs; London: Tilt & Bogue; 1840
- Exhibition Tracts No. 1: How to reward all the exhibitors. London: W.J. Adams.1851.
- 'The British Temperance Banner, an anthem' in BUCKINGHAM, J.S.(Ed.). 1853. The Temperance Offering. London: W. Tweedie. 1853.
