= King's Cross (building) =

Former building in London which gave its name to King's Cross station

Coordinates: 51.5307°N 0.1215°W

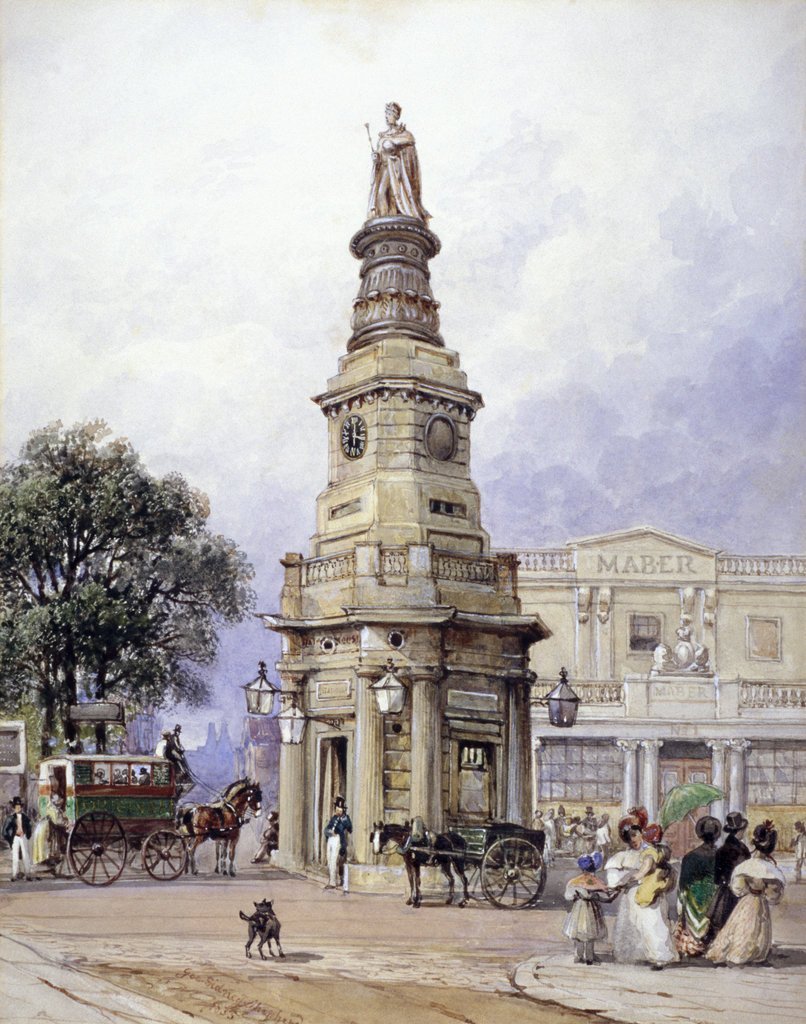
The King's Cross monument. Watercolour by George Shepherd.

King's Cross was a short-lived building in London which gave its name to the area still known as Kings Cross. The building was erected in 1830, as the base for a memorial to the recently deceased King George IV. A statue of the late king was added in 1835, but then removed in 1842, and the structure was demolished in 1845.

== History ==
The structure was built using public subscriptions, raised by its architect and promoter Stephen Geary. He exhibited a model of "the Kings Cross" at the Royal Academy in 1830. The project was originally intended to be called "St George's Cross". The amount raised was disappointingly low, and the structure was correspondingly less impressive than intended.

It was constructed at the junction of Gray's Inn Road, Pentonville Road and New Road (developed in 1765, and renamed Euston Road in 1857), in an area previously known as Battle Bridge, where York Way crossed the River Fleet, reputedly referring to a battle fought between Boudicca's rebellious army of Ancient Britons and soldiers of Ancient Rome. It had an octagonal base with paired columns at each corner, a balustrade at first floor level intended to be decorated with four statues, one on each corner (either kings of England, or the patron saints of England, Scotland, Wales and Ireland; but it is not clear if any statues were ever put in place), rising to a pedestal with a clock. From 1835, it was surmounted by a statue of George IV. The statue stood 11 feet (3.4 m) high, on top of the 60 feet (18 m) high building.

The statue cost no more than £25. It was constructed of bricks and mortar, and finished in a manner that gave it the appearance of stone, "at least to the eyes of common spectators". It was described by Walter Thornbury as "a ridiculous octagonal structure crowned by an absurd statue". It was one of the buildings criticised by Pugin in his 1836 polemical book Contrasts, which advocated a revival of the medieval Gothic style. Pugin compared King's Cross unfavourably with the medieval Chichester Cross.

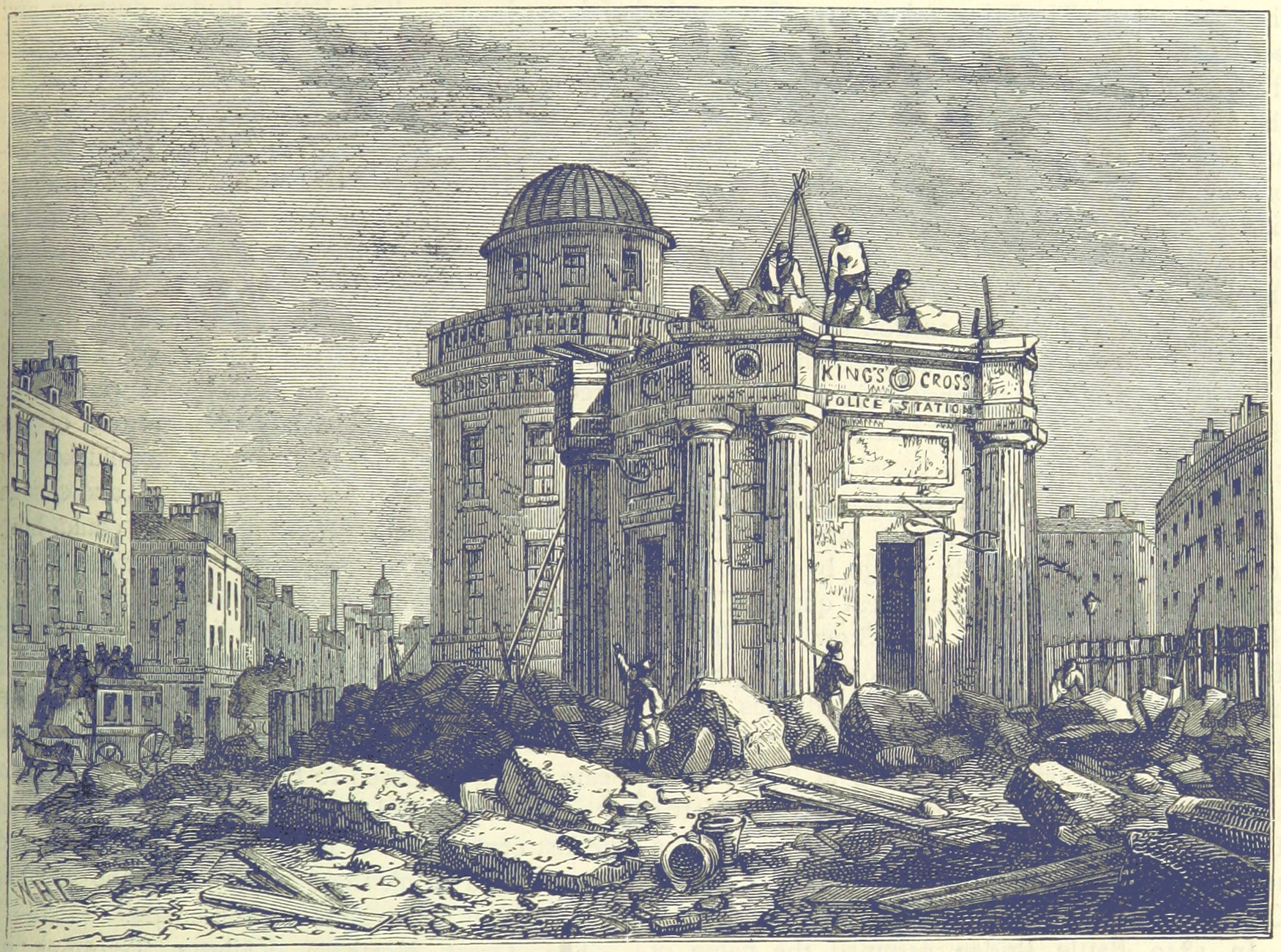
The demolition and removal of the monument

The upper storey was used as a camera obscura. The base was used for exhibitions, then as a police station, and later a public house. The statue was shoddily built, never satisfactory, and was removed in 1842. The building remained in the middle of a public road, and became a hazard to traffic. The building was demolished in 1845, with a report in The Illustrated London News mentioning its "grandiloquent name of King's Cross'". King's Cross railway station opened nearby in 1852.

== See also ==
- Duke of York Column, memorial to his younger brother in Whitehall
- Statue of the Duke of Kent, statue of his younger brother near Regent's Park
