= John Charles Felix Rossi =

English sculptor

John Charles Felix Rossi RA (8 March 1762 – 21 February 1839), often simply known as Charles Rossi, was an English sculptor.

== Life ==
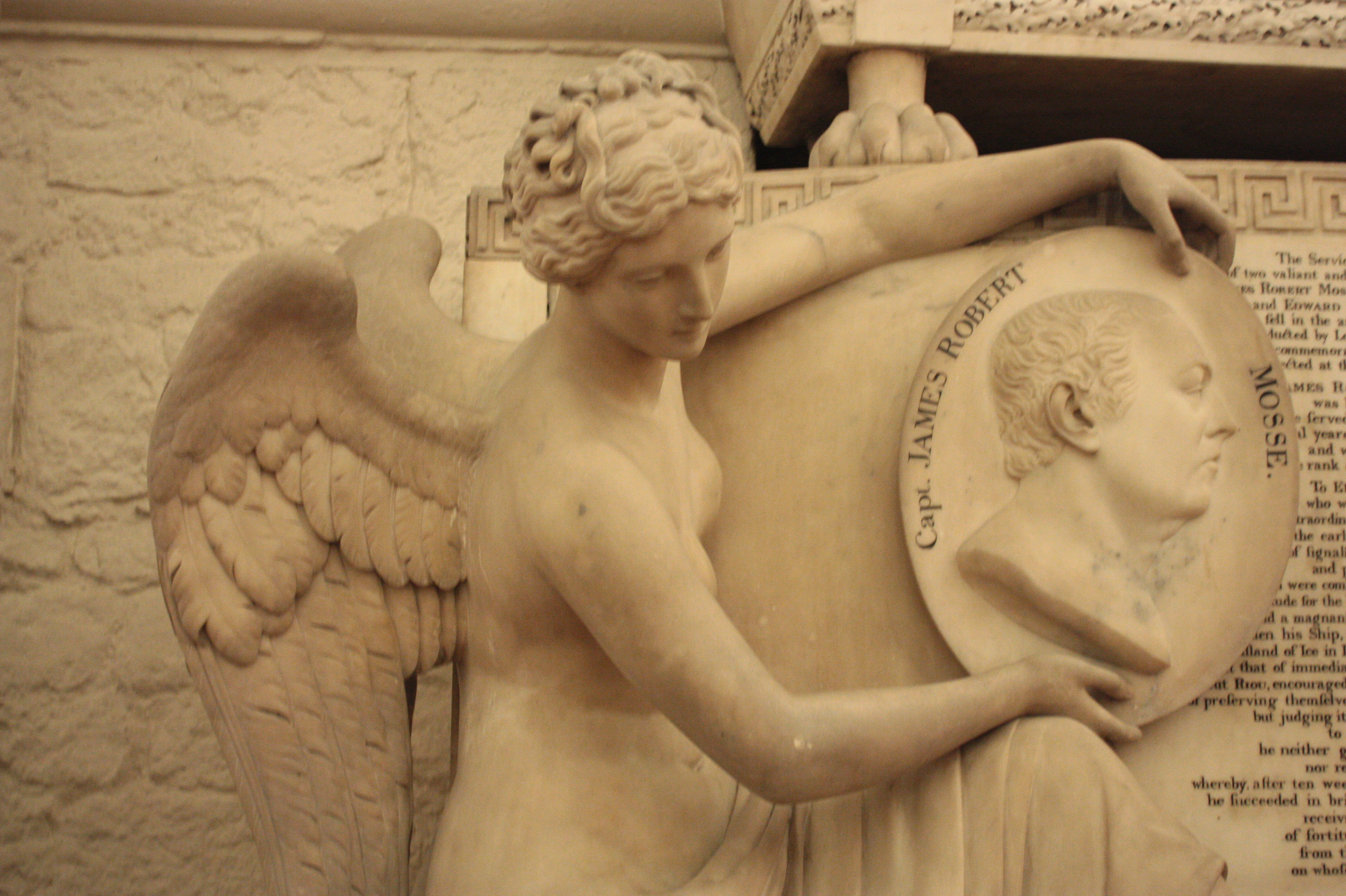
Monument to Cpt James Robert Mosse, St Paul's Cathedral (detail)

=== Early life and education ===
Rossi was born on 8 March 1762 at Nottingham, where his father Ananso, an Italian from Siena, was a quack doctor According to some sources the family later moved to Mountsorrel in Leicestershire, but by 1776, they were living at 9, Haymarket, in London, where the sculptor Giovanni Battista Locatelli, who had just arrived from Italy, came to lodge with them. Some time later, when Locatelli had moved on, and was occupying premises in Union Street, near the Middlesex Hospital, Rossi became his pupil. On completing his apprenticeship, he remained with his master for wages of 18 shillings a week, until he found more lucrative employment at Coade and Seeley's artificial stone works at Lambeth.

Rossi entered the Royal Academy Schools in 1781. He won the silver medal in November of that year, and in 1784 the gold medal for a group showing Venus conducting Helen to Paris. In 1785 he won the travelling studentship, and went to Rome for three years, during which he executed a Mercury in marble, and a reclining figure of Eve.

=== Porcelain and artificial stone ===
By 1788, following his return from Italy, he was modelling figures for the Derby porcelain factory; his name is recorded in connection with figures ordered by the clockmaker Benjamin Vulliamy, some of them based on Vulliamy's own drawings. Around 1790 he went into business in partnership with John Bingley, a London mason, producing work in the form of terracotta or artificial stone. Their works included the statues of Music and Dancing for the Assembly Rooms at Leicester (1796). Rossi later told Joseph Farington that he had lost a large amount money through this enterprise. The partnership with Bingley was formally dissolved in December 1800.

Between 1798 and 1810 Rossi leased premises in Marylebone Park (an area which later became Regent's Park), next to those of James Wyatt. They were described in the St Marylebone rate books as consisting of "A Cottage, Artificial Stone Manufactory and Stable etc." In 1800 Rossi made an artificial stone folly in the form of a "Hindu temple" at Melchet Park, near Romsey to the designs of Thomas Daniell. It was built as a tribute to Warren Hastings, and contained his bust, rising out of a lotus flower, on a pedestal. In 1800–2 he again used artificial stone for the colossal seated figure of Minerva for the dome of Liverpool Town Hall.

=== Royal Academy ===
Rossi became an associate of the Royal Academy in 1798, and a full academician in 1802. His diploma work, a marble bust of George Dance (1827), is still in the possession of the Academy.

=== Monuments in St Paul's ===
During the early years of the 19th century Rossi won several prestigious commissions for monuments to military and naval heroes to be set up in St. Paul's Cathedral, including those to Captain Robert Faulkner (1803), Marquis Cornwallis (1811), Lord Rodney(1811–15) and General Le Marchant (1812). Some of these were elaborate compositions in the grand manner; Cornwallis stands on a pedestal above the three figures representing Britannia and the rivers Begareth and Ganges, denoting the British Empire in Asia. In the monument to Captain Faulkner, Neptune is seated on a rock, in the act of catching the naked figure of a dying sailor, while Victory is about to crown him with laurel. Lord Rodney is represented with allegorical figures of Fame and History. Among those working on these commissions in the studio were a young J. G. Bubb. In the crypt of St Paul's, is Rossi's monument to Captain James Robert Mosse and Captain Edward Riou.

=== Architectural sculpture ===
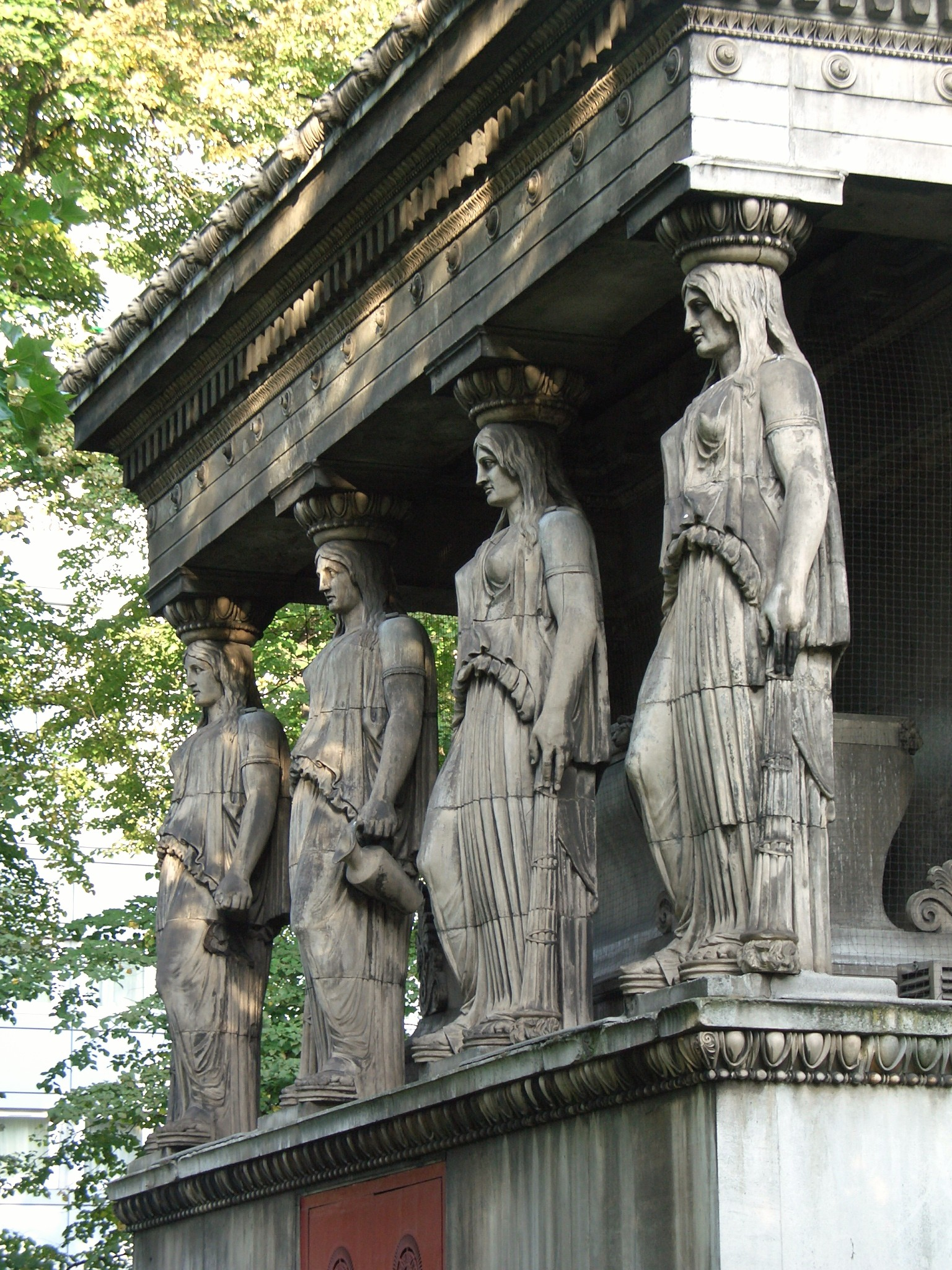
Caryatids, St Pancras New Church, London

In 1809 Rossi worked with John Flaxman on two friezes for the facade of the Covent Garden Theatre. He carved one, of Ancient Drama, from a model by Flaxman. For the other, of Modern Drama, he worked from Flaxman's drawings, making a model himself, before carving it in stone. For the south wing of the theatre, he made a seven-foot high statue of Tragedy as a pendant to Flaxman's Comedy.

With his son Henry, Rossi was contracted to make the door surrounds, capitals, and other terracotta architectural decorations for William and Henry William Inwood's Greek revival St Pancras New Church (1819–22). They were paid £4300 for the work. A contemporary report described the terracotta used for the capitals as "a modern composition of Mr. Rossi's invention, which it is hoped will rival in firmness and durability the same description of material of the ancients". The decorations included two sets of caryatids. Modelled on those at the Erechtheum in Athens, they were built up in sections cemented around structural cast-iron columns.

=== Elgin Marbles ===
In 1816 Rossi was one of the experts questioned by a select committee of the House of Commons enquiring into whether the government should purchase the sculptures from the Parthenon then in the possession of Lord Elgin. He told the committee that the Elgin Marbles were the best sculptures he had ever seen, superior both to the Apollo Belvedere and the Laocoön.

=== Later years ===
Rossi owned a large house in Lisson Grove. By 1817 his prosperity had declined, and he rented out part of it to the painter Benjamin Robert Haydon, who was then temporarily solvent. Haydon was to remain Rossi's tenant until his imprisonment for debt in 1823. In 1818 he went into partnership with his former student J. G. Bubb to provide a large number of sculptures for the new Customs House in London, for which they used a composite material of their own design, a form of terracotta, but within six years the badly constructed building had been demolished.

During the 1820s Rossi again received some substantial commissions. He made another monument for St Paul's Cathedral, this time to Lord Heathfield(1823–5). The Earl of Egremont commissioned Rossi to execute several works for Petworth, including Celadon and Amelia (c.1821) and the British Pugilist or Athleta Britannicus (1828), a statue of a boxer, almost two metres tall, carved from a single piece of marble. He also executed a statue of the poet Thomson for Sir Robert Peel. A bronze bust of James Wyatt and an artificial stone one of Edward Thurlow are in the collection of the National Portrait Gallery.

The Prince Regent appointed Rossi his sculptor, and employed him in the decoration of Buckingham Palace, where he made chimneypieces, a frieze of the Seasons to his own design, and others friezes to the designs of John Flaxman. He also made sculpture for the Marble Arch, originally built as an entrance to the palace. When the planned height of the arch was reduced, some of Rossi's work became surplus to requirements and was instead adapted for use on the new National Gallery. Rossi was also sculptor in ordinary to William IV.

In later life he suffered from ill-health and financial difficulties. He did not exhibit at the Academy after 1834, and in 1835 he exhibited the works which remained at his studio in Lisson Grove prior to their sale by auction. He retired from the Royal Academy with a pension shortly before his death at St John's Wood on 21 February 1839. An obituary in The Art Union noted "Mr Rossi has bequeathed to his family nothing but his fame." He married twice and had eight children by each wife. He was interred in the burial ground of St James's Church, Piccadilly, which was located some way from the church, beside Hampstead Road, Camden, London.

== Sources ==
- O'Keefe, Paul (2009). A Genius for Failure:The Life of Benjamin Robert Haydon. London: The Bodley Head. p. 177. ISBN 9780224062473.
- This article incorporates text from a publication now in the public domain: Dodgson, Campbell (1897). "Rossi, John Charles Felix". In Lee, Sidney (ed.). Dictionary of National Biography. Vol. 49. London: Smith, Elder & Co.
