= Sebastian Gahagan =

Anglo-Irish sculptor

Sebastian Gahagan (1779 – 2 March 1838) was a sculptor of Irish descent active in London. His most notable works are the monument to Sir Thomas Picton in St Paul's Cathedral, and a statue of the Duke of Kent in Park Crescent, Portland Place. He was also employed by Joseph Nollekens, carrying out the carving of many of his major works.

== Life ==
Gahagan was born in Westminster in 1779, the son of the Irish-born sculptor Lawrence Gahagan; his brothers were Charles (born c.1765), Lucius (1773-1855) and Vincent (1776-1832). He is said to have been born in Dublin, although his father seems to have settled London about 20 years before his birth.

In London he became an assistant to Joseph Nollekens, carrying out the carving of many of his major works, including the statue of William Pitt for the Senate House at Cambridge (1809), and producing copies of busts. In his biography of Nollekens, JT Smith used the relatively small payments received by Gahagan as evidence of the older sculptor's miserliness. In 1809 he received a premium of £50 from the British Institution for Sampson Breaking his Bonds. He was a frequent exhibitor at the Royal Academy from 1802 to 1835, mostly of designs for funerary monuments, with occasional portrait statues and busts. His address is given in the Academy catalogues as 58 Tichfield Street until 1816; 33 King Street, Westminster, between 1817 and 1825; 26, William Street, Regent's Park in 1833; 57, Ernest Street, Regent's Park in 1834 and 25, Little Clarendon Street, Somers Town the next year. At the time of his death he is described as "of Euston-square".

== Works ==
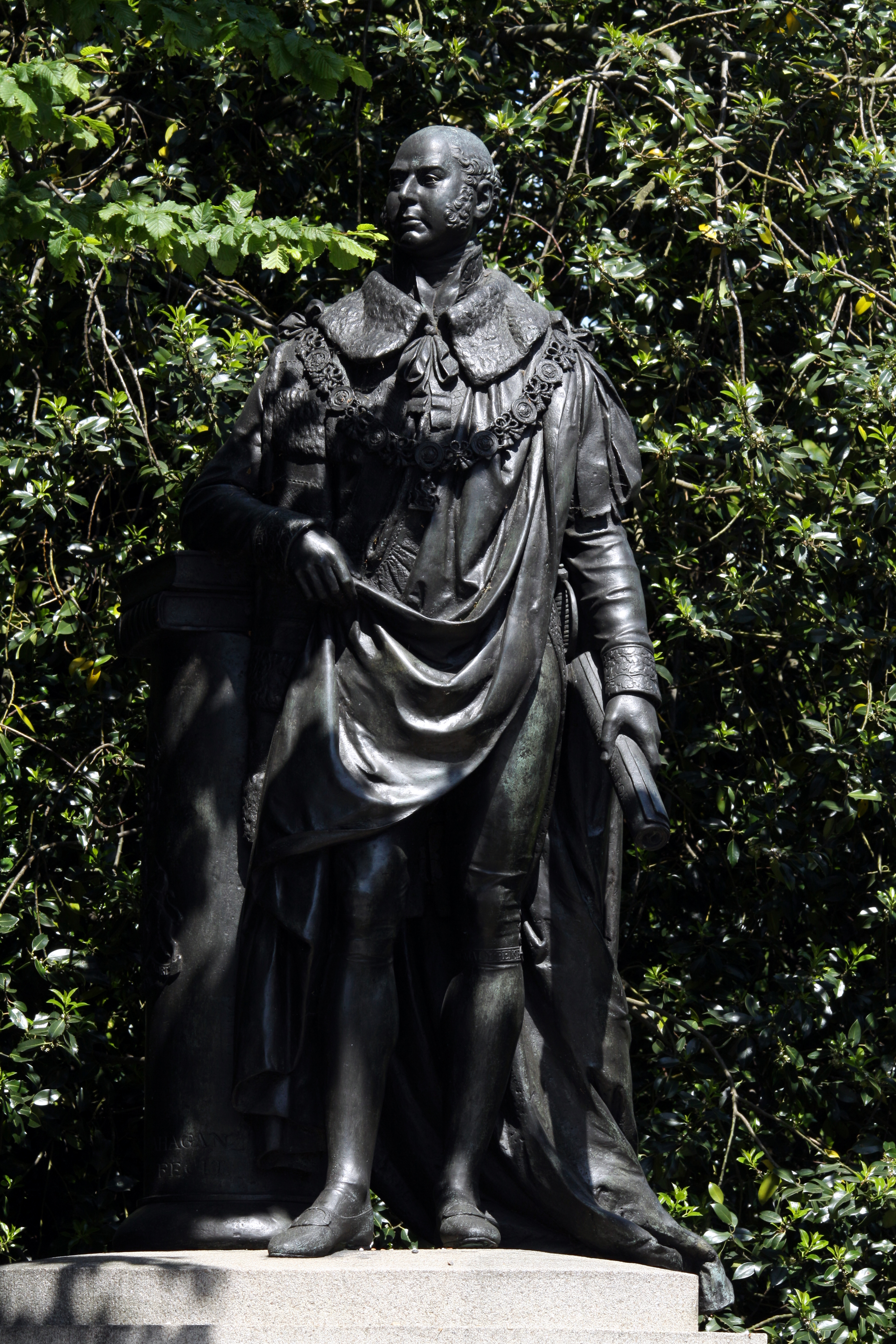
Gahagan's statue of the Duke of Kent in Park Crescent, Portland Place, London (1824).

As well as his work for Nollekens, Gahagan received several major commissions. His works as an independent sculptor include:

- Monument to Charles Burney in Westminster Abbey (1819). Consisting of a memorial tablet, surmounted by a bust of Burney copied from one by Nollekens exhibited at the Royal Academy in 1815.
- The monument to Sir Thomas Picton in St. Paul's Cathedral, an elaborate composition, commissioned in 1816 and completed in 1820, incorporating a life size bust of Picton, and figures representing Fame and Britannia. Gahagan also produced several busts of Picton, one of which he exhibited at the Royal Academy in 1818.
- Bust of Charles Hutton (1822). Commissioned by a group of subscribers and presented to Hutton, a former Professor of Mathematics at the Royal Military Academy, Woolwich, three months before his death in January 1823 Hutton said of it:
  My friends tell me it is like me, but that it is too grave for me, though gravity is a part of my character. For the likeness and expression I cannot myself be the judge; but I can vouch for the accuracy, for I have measured it in every point with the callipers.
- A bronze statue of the Duke of Kent in Park Crescent, Portland Place. Installed in January 1824, the statue, 7 feet 2 inches (2.18 m) high, represents the duke in his Field Marshal's uniform, over which he wears his ducal dress and the regalia of the Order of the Garter.
- A statue of George IV for the Royal Exchange, commissioned in 1831.

He may also have been responsible for the figures of Isis and Osiris made for the front of William Bullock's Egyptian Hall in Piccadilly (1811), now in the collection of the Museum of London, although some sources attribute these to his father, Lawrence.

== Death ==
Gahagan died, aged 60, in 1838 and was buried in the parish of St Pancras, then in Middlesex, on 7 March of that year. Several other members of his family, apart from his father and brothers became sculptors and modellers; they included his nephew Lucius Gahagan, and his niece, Sarah.
