= Lawrence Gahagan =

Irish-born sculptor

Lawrence Gahagan or Geoghegan (1735–1820) was an 18th/19th century Irish-born sculptor. He specialised in small bronze portrait busts.

== Life ==
Gahagan was born Lawrence Geoghegan in Dublin in 1735 probably into a family of stonemasons. He attended the Dublin Society School and won their "premium" (cash prize) in 1756 for a statuette of Rubens. Around 1757 he left Ireland and sailed to London where he changed his name to Gahagan.

He exhibited at the Royal Academy from 1798 to 1817.

He lived, worked and died in Westminster.

== Works ==
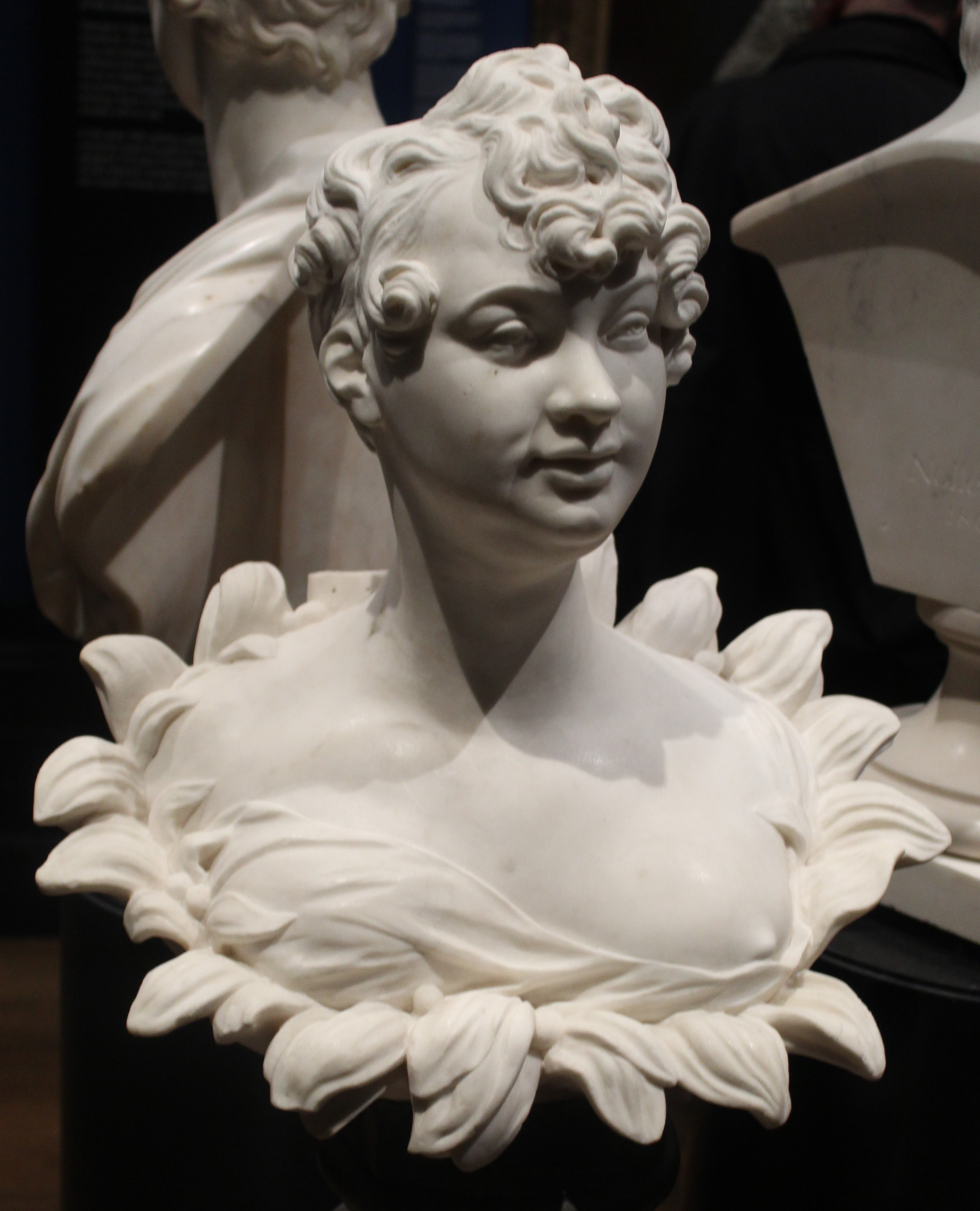
Bust of Mary Anne Clarke by Gahagan, National Portrait Gallery, London

- Bust of Admiral Sir Thomas Pasley (1798)
- Bust of Admiral Horatio Nelson (1798)
- Bust of William Pitt (1800)
- Internal decoration at Castle Howard (1801 to 1811)
- Bust of Nelson (1804) at Bath Art Gallery
- Monument to George Napier at Redland Chapel in Bristol (1804)
- Bust of Bishop of St. Pol de Leon (1809)
- Bust of Dr Hawes (1809)
- Monument to Joseph Baldwin at Cholesbury church (1810)
- Bust of Wellington (1811) at Stratfield Saye
- Bust of Sir Samuel Romilly (1816)
- Group - "George IV presenting Peace to the Goddess of the Earth"
- Composition - "The Death of Spencer Perceval"
- Group - "A Missionary Preaching to the South Sea Islanders"
- Statuette of William IV seated on a Chair
- Statuette of King George III
- Statuette of Lady Hood
- Statuette of Princess Caraboo
- Statuette of Hannah Moore
- Group - "The Murder of Maria Bagnell by Gillingham the Murderer"
- Bust of Emperor Alexander I of Russia
- Bust of Lord Byron
- Bust of Sir Edward Parry
- Bust of Gabriel Goldney, Mayor of Chippenham
- Bust of Madame Catalini
- Bust of General Blucher
- Bust of the Marquess of Albuquerque
- Bust of Rev Jay
- Bust of Mr Trevor
- Bust of Mr Tottenham

== Family ==
On 7 June 1762 at St Pancras Old Church he married Phoebe Hunter (born 1741). They had at least ten children, several of which (both male and female) became sculptors.

- Sarah Gahagan (died 1866) sculptor
- Lucius Gahagan (born 1866) sculptor in Bath (facade of 9 Quiet Street Bath) and head of David Garrick on the Garrick Head Hotel
- Charles Gahagan (1764–1844) sculptor (assistant to John Flaxman)
- Vincent Gahagan (1776–1831) sculptor
- Sebastian Gahagan (1779–1838) sculptor
- Phoebe Gahagan
- Bunius Gahagan

Vincent's son, Edwin Gahagan (died 1858) was also a sculptor.
