= Park Crescent, London =

Coordinates: 51°31′22″N 0°08′46″W

Park Crescent
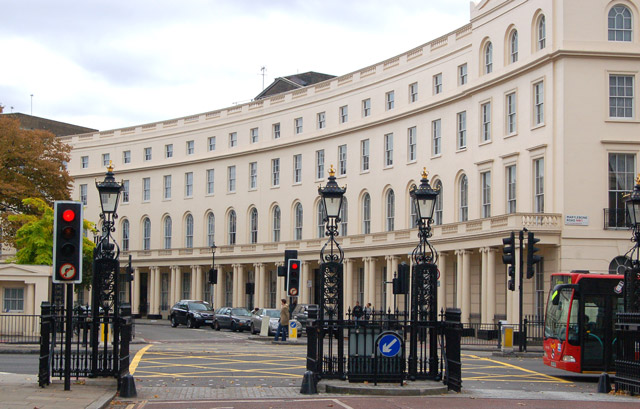
- Much of the north-to-west facing façade of the east half of the crescent in 2009

- Location within City of Westminster
- Type: Protected architecture
- Location: south of Regent's Park, London, UK

History
- Built: 1812-1821

Site notes
- Architect: John Nash
- Architectural style: Regency architecture
- Owner: Crown Estate

Listed Building – Grade I
- Official name: 98, Portland Place W1; 8-14, Park Crescent W1; 1-6, Park Crescent W1
- Designated: 5 February 1970
- Reference no.: 1225956

Listed Building – Grade I
- Official name: Numbers 18 to 26 (including the former Number 27)
- Designated: 10 September 1954
- Reference no.: 1225959

Listed Building – Grade II
- Official name: East Lodge in Corner of Crescent Gardens
- Designated: 5 February 1970
- Reference no.: 1225957

Listed Building – Grade II
- Official name: West Lodge in Corner of Crescent Gardens
- Designated: 5 February 1970
- Reference no.: 1225960

Listed Building – Grade II
- Official name: Railings around Crescent Gardens
- Designated: 5 February 1970
- Reference no.: 1225961

Park Crescent is at the north end of Portland Place and south of Marylebone Road in London near Regent's Park. The crescent consists of elegant stuccoed terraced houses by the architect John Nash, which form a semicircle. The crescent is part of Nash's and wider town-planning visions of Roman-inspired imperial West End approaches to Regent's Park. It was originally conceived as a circus (circle) to be named Regent's Circus but instead Park Square was built to the north. The only buildings on the Regent's Park side of the square are garden buildings, enabling higher floors of the Park Crescent buildings to have a longer, green northern view to the park.

It was built under the patronage of the Prince Regent. As the freeholder, the Crown Estate co-organises repairs, maintains the gardens and has a minor, overarching interest, entitled to lease renewal premiums and any agreed ground rents.

Both terraces and the communal garden have statutory protection in the highest categories. They are Grade I listed on the National Heritage List for England and on the Register of Historic Parks and Gardens (as part of Regent's Park).

== History ==
At an early stage, Nash proposed the construction of a "circus" (meaning a circular development), entailing another crescent to the north, but Park Square was constructed instead. Work on Park Crescent started in 1806, but in the difficult economic conditions of the Napoleonic Wars, the builder Charles Mayor went bankrupt after six houses had been built. It was completed only in 1819 to 1821. Famous residents in the nineteenth century included Lord Lister, who, prior to his elevation to the peerage was created a baronet, of Park Crescent in the Parish of St Marylebone in the County of Middlesex.

The interiors of the buildings have been completely rebuilt. After the Second World War, Park Crescent was in poor condition (as were other Nash terraces near Regent's Park). The Gorell Report on the future of the Regent's Park terraces recommended that the facades of Park Crescent should be saved. In an example of facadism, they were restored in the 1960s, when the leases came up for renewal, and they are protected as grade I listed buildings. However, behind the curve of the crescent, the Crown Estate built new structures, sometimes for office rather than residential use. As a result of the listed status of the facade, interior features which are visible from the street, such as light fittings, have to respect the Regency design of the facade. The complex has been fully rebuilt according to the design of Nash's original facade, replacing the 1960s restoration, which has been regarded as botched.

The Crescent has housed institutions such as International Students House, London and the Institute of Chartered Secretaries and Administrators. However, there has been a trend back to residential use. Many of the houses are now converted into expensive flats.

== Garden ==
The semicircle is divided into two halves by Portland Place. Between the arms of the crescent is a private garden, which is recognised as being of historic interest. (The Register of Parks and Gardens entry for Regent's Park was amended in November 2008 to include Park Crescent and Park Square).

The garden is opened each year as part of the London Open Garden Squares Weekend, an initiative of the London Parks & Gardens Trust.

The east and west lodges of the garden facing the Marylebone Road are listed Grade II. The railings around the garden are also listed Grade II, as is the cattle trough opposite No. 14 Park Crescent.

== Statue ==
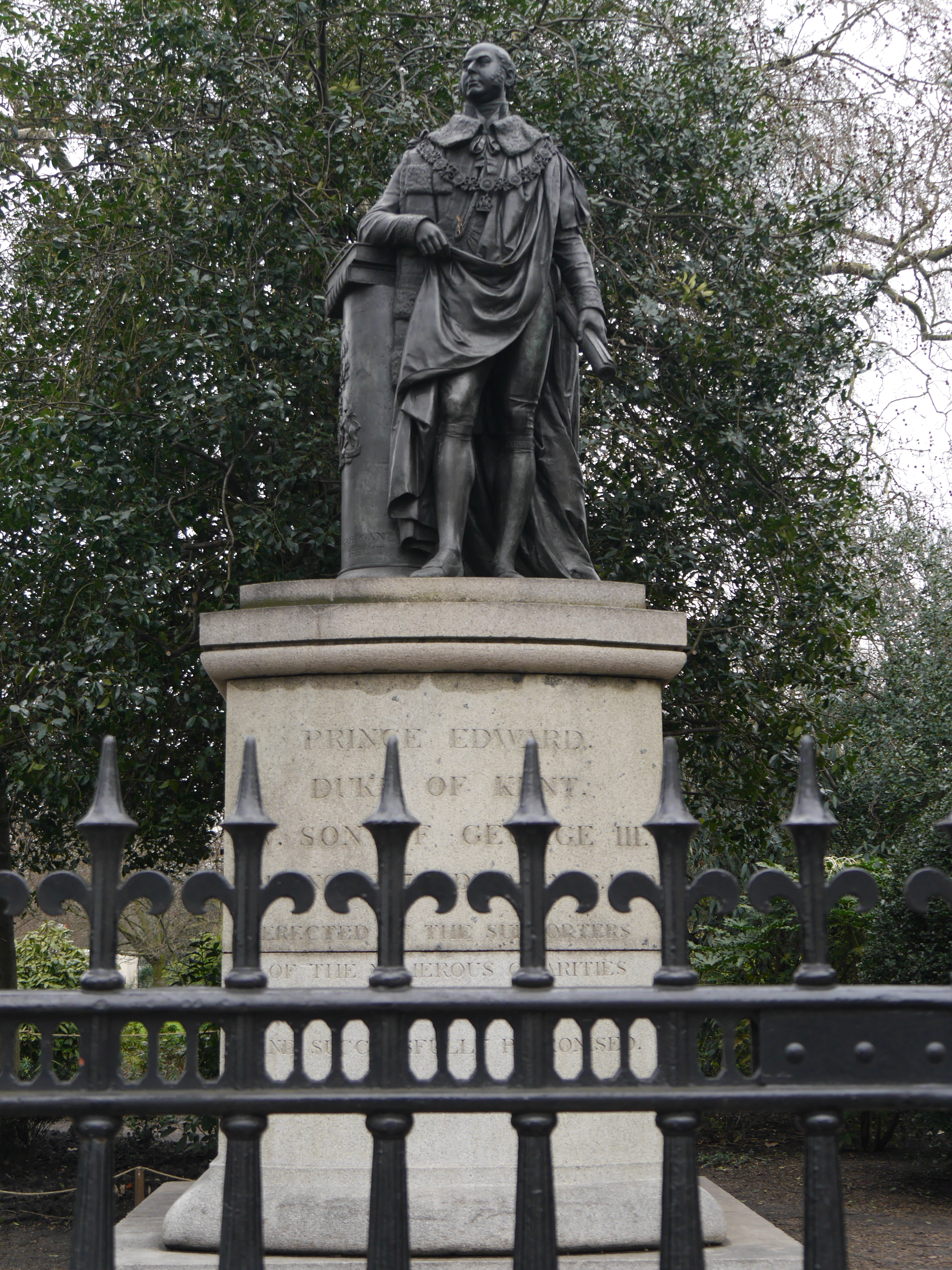
Statue of the Duke of Kent (1824) by Sebastian Gahagan.

Just inside the garden railings, facing the top of Portland Place, is a bronze statue of Queen Victoria's father, Prince Edward, Duke of Kent and Strathearn. Sculpted by Sebastian Gahagan and installed in January 1824, the statue is seven feet two inches tall and represents the Duke in his Field Marshal's uniform, over which he wears his ducal dress and the regalia of the Order of the Garter.

== Related structures ==
=== Mews ===
There are two mews behind the crescent, Park Crescent Mews East and West.

=== Subterranean structures ===
- A large ice house predates the crescent.
- An unusual and original local feature is the "Nursemaids' Tunnel", an early example of an underpass, linking the gardens of Park Crescent to the gardens of Park Square on the other side of Marylebone Road.
- Regent's Park tube station has two ramps/stairs but a sole entrance, on the Marylebone Road side of the garden.
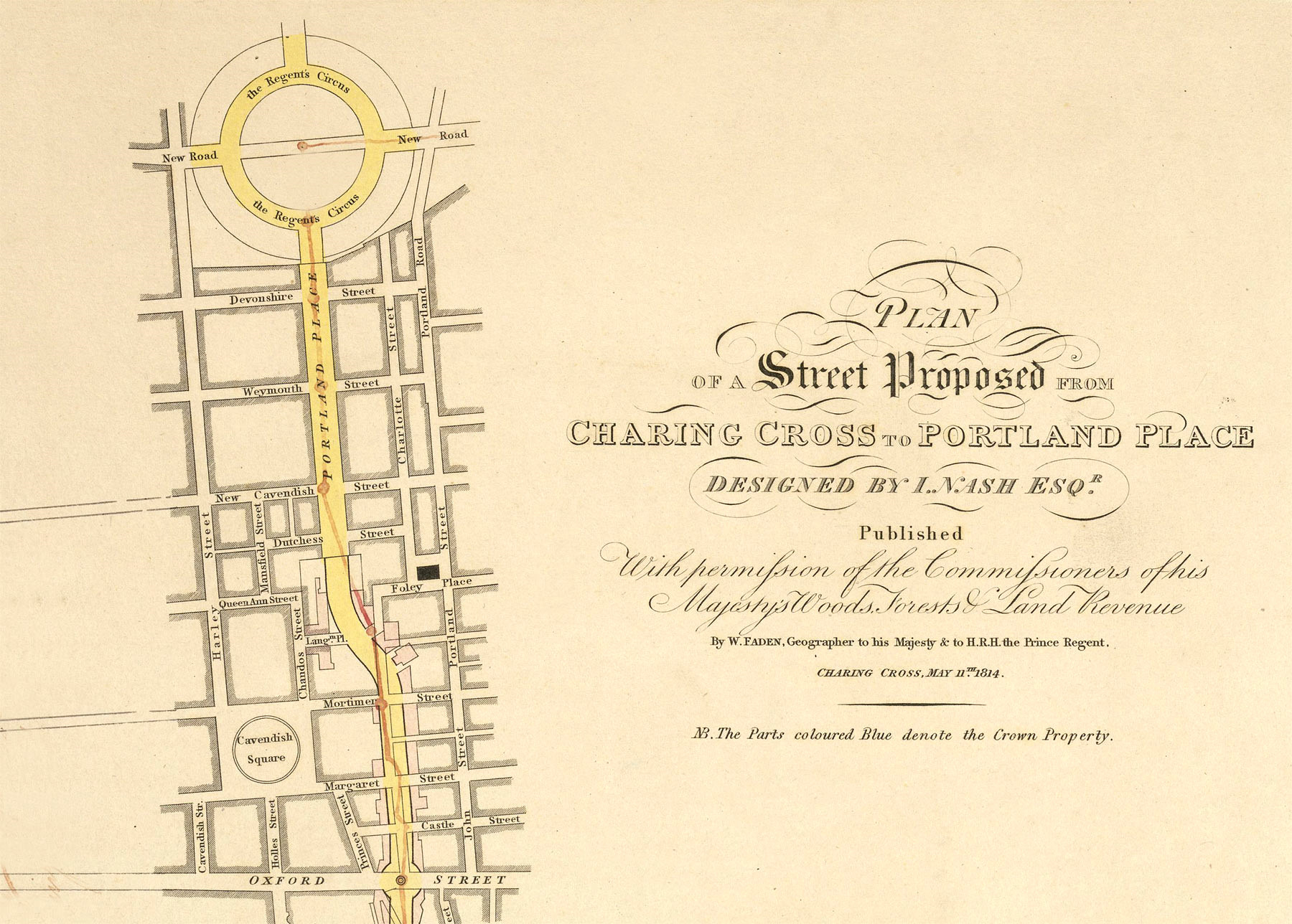
Regent's Circus (top) as originally conceived in 1814.

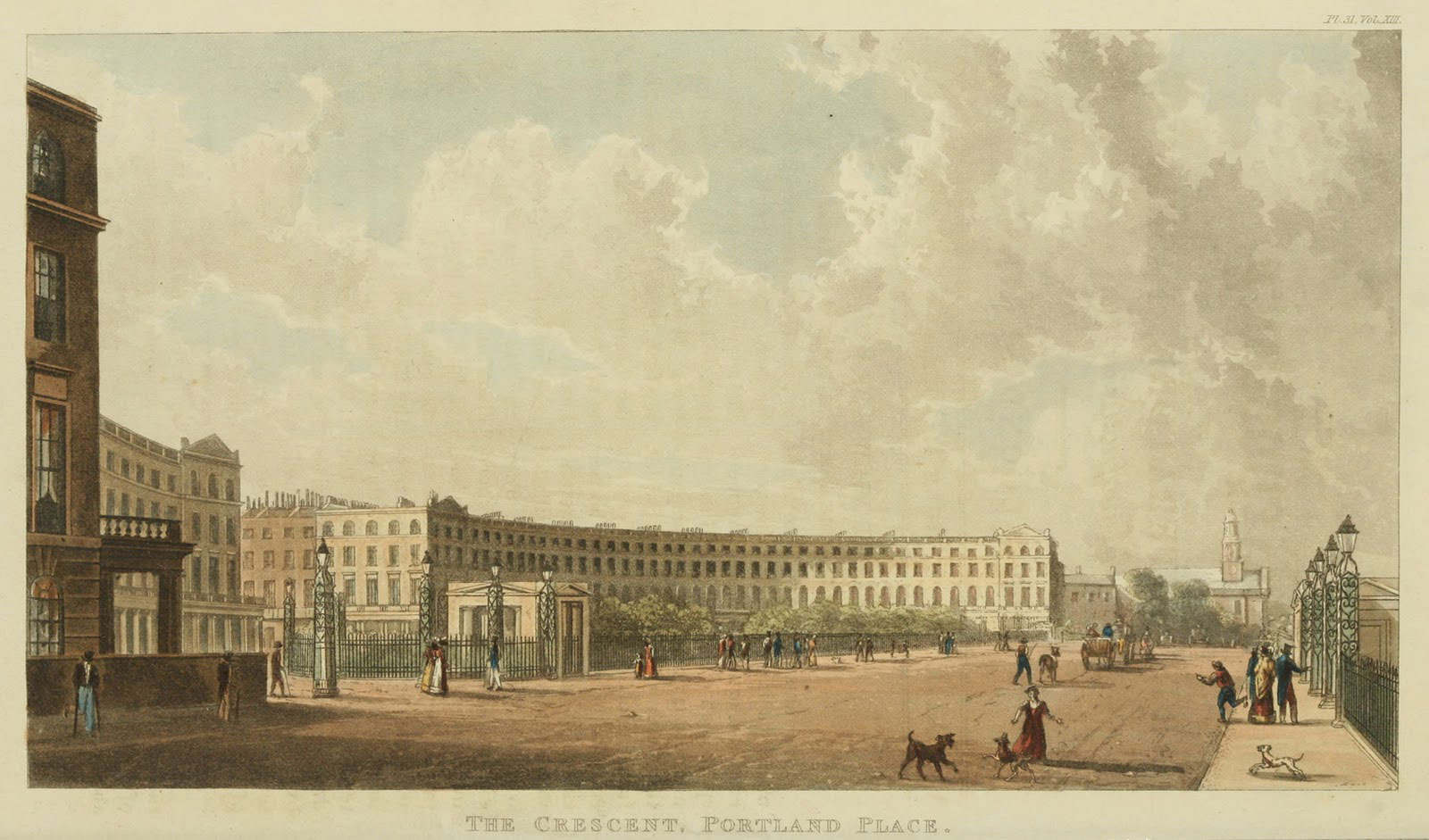
Painting showing an old name: The Crescent, Portland Place by Rudolph Ackermann, 1822.

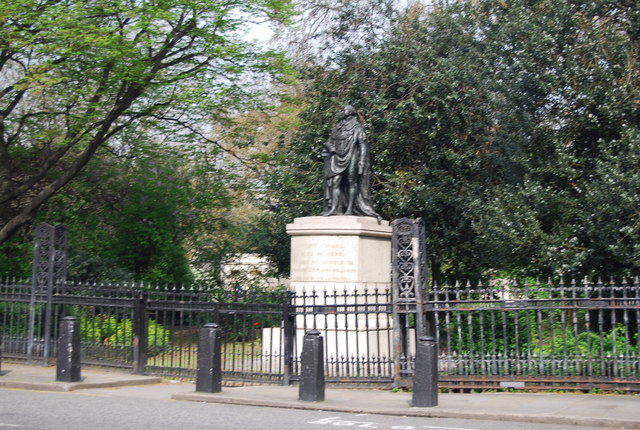
Statue cast in 1824 of Prince Edward, Duke of Kent by Sebastian Gahagan.

A map showing the Park Crescent ward of St Marylebone Metropolitan Borough as it appeared in 1916; note re-warding was intended as a regularly-changing demographic action, for roughly equal apportionment of voters, so each has a fair total of voters or residents to councillors. For a few, London's are turned to for self-identity, rivalling postcodes, the original Anglican parish scheme, key amenities such as Tube stations or similar zones of housing; but they can be completely redrawn and renamed.
