= List of public art in St Marylebone =

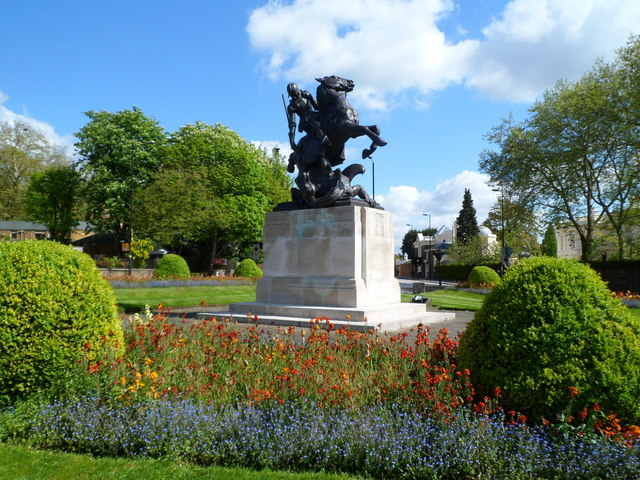
St Marylebone War Memorial

This is a list of public artworks in the former Metropolitan Borough of St Marylebone in London, now a part of the City of Westminster.

== Fitzrovia ==
Part of Fitzrovia lies outside the City of Westminster; for works not listed here see the List of public art in the London Borough of Camden.

Fitzrovia, so named since the 1930s when it became a haunt for bohemians, is situated to the north of Soho and east of Marylebone. Its eastern part is in the London Borough of Camden.

Image	Title / subject	Location and coordinates	Date	Artist / designer	Architect / other	Type	Designation	Notes
	Atalante and Caryatid	82 Mortimer Street	1896		Arthur Beresford Pite			
More images	Ariel and Prospero	Broadcasting House, Langham Place	1931	Eric Gill				
	Ariel between Wisdom and Gaiety	Broadcasting House, Langham Place	1931	Eric Gill				
	Ariel Learns Celestial Music	Broadcasting House, Langham Place	1931	Eric Gill				
	Ariel Piping to the Children	Broadcasting House, Langham Place	1931	Eric Gill				
	Bust of John Nash	All Souls Church, Langham Place	1956	Cecil Thomas after William Behnes				
	Winged Figure	Outside John Lewis department store, Oxford Street	1963	Barbara Hepworth				
	Untitled	Forecourt of the University of Westminster's Cavendish Campus, New Cavendish Street 51.5207°N 0.1397°W	2001–2004	Ben Joiner	Rock Townsend	Sculptures	—N/a	Seven sculptures of varying degrees of abstraction, two of which are recognisable as flasks and one other as a funnel. They relate to the activities taking place inside the building behind, which houses the university's department of biosciences.
	World	Broadcasting House, Portland Place 51.5185°N 0.1434°W	2002–2013	Mark Pimlott	MJP Architects	Work set into pavement	—N/a	
	Breathing	Egton Wing, Broadcasting House, Langham Street	2008	Jaume Plensa			—N/a	
	If Graffiti Changed Anything	Clipstone Street 51.5214°N 0.1401°W	2011	Banksy	—N/a	Mural	—N/a	The phrase is based on a quotation from the anarchist Emma Goldman: "If voting changed anything, it would be illegal". In the years since its creation the work has been covered by a Perspex sheet and has attracted other graffiti.

== Lisson Grove ==
Lisson Grove, a residential area which urbanised as London expanded northwards in the 19th century, was designated a conservation area in 1990.

Image	Title / subject	Location and coordinates	Date	Artist / designer	Architect / other	Type	Designation	Notes
	Sculpture	Ark King Solomon Academy (formerly the Rutherford School), Penfold Street 51.5215°N 0.1695°W	1960	Leonard Manasseh	Leonard Manasseh and Ian Baker	Sculpture	Grade II	
	Echo	Rossmore Road 51.5255°N 0.1627°W	2004	Charles Hadcock	—N/a	Sculpture	—N/a	

== Marylebone ==
Marylebone is an inner-city area roughly defined as being bounded by Oxford Street to the south, Marylebone Road to the north, Edgware Road to the west and Great Portland Street to the east. Portland Place, part of the grand route from Regent's Park to St James's planned by John Nash (who is commemorated by a bust outside All Souls, Langham Place), has historically been an attractive place for the erection of memorials because of its width.

Image	Title / subject	Location and coordinates	Date	Artist / designer	Architect / other	Type	Designation	Notes
More images	Statue of Prince Edward, Duke of Kent and Strathearn	Park Crescent 51.5230°N 0.1462°W	1824	Sebastian Gahagan	—N/a	Statue	Grade II	Unveiled 21 February 1824. The Duke, in robes and the collar of the Garter, stands with his right arm rested on two books, which lie on top of a truncated column. Among the symbols which appear on the column shaft is the Masonic all-seeing eye.
More images	Statue of Lord George Bentinck	Cavendish Square 51.5162°N 0.1449°W	1851	Thomas Campbell	—N/a	Statue	Grade II	Erected 4 November 1851. Bentinck is depicted standing, in a contemporary frock coat. The pedestal appears to have been changed twice since the original installation, the first having been insufficiently lofty and the second excessively so.
	Memorial to Charles Wesley	Garden of Rest (St Mary-le-Bone Old Churchyard) 51.5220°N 0.1517°W	1858	?	—N/a	Obelisk	—N/a	Stands close to the site where Wesley was buried in 1788.
More images	William Pitt Byrne Memorial Fountain	Bryanston Square 51.5167°N 0.1605°W	1862	—N/a	Julia Clara Byrne	Drinking fountain	Grade II	The fountain with plaque and urn finial stands upon a heap of differently coloured stones.
More images	Hamilton Memorial Drinking Fountain Sir James Hamilton, 2nd Baronet	Portman Square 51.5159°N 0.1548°W	1878	?	—N/a	Drinking fountain	Grade II	Donated by Hamilton's widow through the Metropolitan Drinking Fountain and Cattle Trough Association.
More images	Street Orderly Boy	Paddington Street Gardens 51.5205°N 0.1539°W	c. 1881	Donato Barcaglia	—N/a	Statue	—N/a	Possibly the work Barcaglia exhibited in 1881 under the title Spazzacamino ("Chimney Sweep"). Donated to Marylebone council in 1943, when it was given its present title. Orderly boys were employed by the parish councils of London to clean the streets, but were probably unheard of in Italy.
	Grammar, Astronomy, Justice, Philosophy, Homer and Fame	37 Harley Street	1897–1899	Frederick E. E. Schenck	Arthur Beresford Pite	Architectural sculpture	Grade II*	
	Christ as the Good Shepherd	Church Institute & Club, 60 Paddington Street	c. 1898–1900	John Daymond III or John Dudley Daymond	Thomas Harris	Architectural sculpture	Grade II	
More images	Wallace fountain Sir Richard Wallace, 1st Baronet	Forecourt of the Wallace Collection, Manchester Square 51.5173°N 0.1528°W	1904 (cast of a design of 1872)	Charles-Auguste Lebourg	—N/a	Drinking fountain	Grade II*	An example of the "large model" of drinking fountain donated by Wallace to the city of Paris from 1872. This cast was erected in Shoreditch in 1904, the gift of a local councillor. Re-erected on this site after restoration in 1960.
More images	Memorial to Quintin Hogg	Portland Place 51.5189°N 0.1444°W	1906	George Frampton	—N/a	Sculptural group	Grade II	Unveiled 24 November 1906 on a site immediately opposite the Royal Polytechnic Institution on Regent Street; relocated in 1933. It also commemorates Hogg's wife Alice and students of the Polytechnic killed in both World Wars.
More images	Marylebone War Memorial	Church of the Annunciation, Bryanston Street 51.5143°N 0.1579°W	c. 1920	?	Walter Tapper	Calvary	Grade II	No documentation for this sculpture appears to have survived.
More images	Metropolitan Railway War Memorial	Baker Street tube station, near Platform 5 (eastbound) 51.5232°N 0.1569°W	1920	?	Charles Walter Clark	Relief	Grade II*	Unveiled 11 November 1920. A large wall tablet flanked by Ionic columns and surmounted by a relief of a lion crushing a serpent.
More images	Statue of George Stuart White	Portland Place 51.5208°N 0.1453°W	1922	John Tweed	—N/a	Equestrian statue	Grade II	Unveiled 19 December 1922. The statue was the focus of the Boer War Veterans Association's annual commemoration of the Relief of Ladysmith; a wreath was laid at its foot on 28 February every year until 1970.
More images	Memorial to Joseph Lister, 1st Baron Lister	Portland Place 51.5225°N 0.1460°W	1922	Thomas Brock; completed by Frank Arnold Wright	—N/a	Memorial with bust and other sculpture	Grade II	Unveiled 13 March 1924. Only the colossal bust of Lister was completed by Brock, who died in 1922. The group of Humanity with a nude male youth was completed by Wright, a studio assistant.
	Science, Music and Art	17 Cavendish Square (Wigmore Street elevation)	c. 1923–1924	Gilbert Bayes	T. P. Bennett & Hossack	Reliefs	Grade II	
	Orchestra of Child Musicians	17 Cavendish Square (Wigmore Street elevation)	c. 1923–1924	Gilbert Bayes	T. P. Bennett & Hossack	Relief	Grade II	
More images	Art	Selfridges, Oxford Street	1929	William Reid Dick	John James Burnet and Thomas S. Tait	Architectural sculpture	Grade II*	
More images	Science	Selfridges, Oxford Street	1929	William Reid Dick	John James Burnet and Thomas S. Tait	Architectural sculpture	Grade II*	
More images	The Queen of Time	Selfridges, Oxford Street	1930	Gilbert Bayes	John James Burnet and Thomas S. Tait	Architectural sculpture	Grade II*	
More images	Madonna and Child	Dean's Mews, Cavendish Square	1952	Jacob Epstein	Louis Osman	Architectural sculpture		
	Charles Dickens Panel	Ferguson House, Marylebone Road	1960	Estcourt James (Jim) Clack	Clifford Culpin	Relief	—N/a	
More images	Bust of John F. Kennedy	1 Park Crescent 51.5239°N 0.1447°W	1965	Jacques Lipchitz	—N/a	Bust	—N/a	Unveiled 15 May 1965 by Robert F. Kennedy. The fruit of a fundraising campaign by The Sunday Telegraph. Lipchitz struggled with the commission as Kennedy was not alive to take sittings. Displeased with the finished work, he was absent at the unveiling.
	Heron	Heron Place, George Street	1967	?	Spratley & Partners (post-1960s refurbishment)	Architectural sculpture	—N/a	Commissioned by Heron International.
	Tile motif	Oxford Circus tube station, Victoria line platforms	c. 1967–1969	Hans Unger	—N/a	Tile motif	—N/a	The motif depicts the convergence of the Bakerloo, Central and Victoria lines within a circle representing Oxford Circus. The platform was damaged in a fire in 1984.
	Madame Tussaud	Madame Tussauds, Marylebone Road	1969	Arthur Pollen		Relief	—N/a	A portrait medallion in fibreglass.
	Sherlock Holmes murals	Baker Street tube station platforms	1979	Robin Jacques	—N/a	Murals	Grade II*	Murals depicting scenes from seven of Conan Doyle's stories.
More images	Sherlock Holmes motifs	Baker Street tube station platforms	c. 1983	Michael Douglas and Pamela Moreton	—N/a	Tile motifs and enamel panels	Grade II*	The scheme consists of motifs of the detective's head in profile and murals depicting scenes from his adventures. The designs were by Douglas, the over-glaze printing by Moreton.
	Mother and Child	Outside the Portland Hospital for Women and Children, Great Portland Street 51.5229°N 0.1441°W	1983	David Norris	—N/a	Sculpture	—N/a	A glass surround and back-lights were added during improvements to the hospital's forecourt in 2010.
	Mosaics and enamel panels	Oxford Circus tube station, Central and Bakerloo line platforms	1983; 1985	Nicholas Munro	—N/a	Mosaics and enamel panels	—N/a	Munro, a student at the Royal College of Art, based the designs on his (not entirely favourable) impressions of the station. The designs on the Central line platforms refer to the game of Snakes and Ladders and those on the Bakerloo line depict commuters in a maze.
	Arch motifs	Marble Arch tube station platforms	1985	Annabel Grey	—N/a	Enamel panels	—N/a	A series of sixteen colourful triumphal arch designs enamelled onto steel sheets. Each arch is made of nine separate steel sheets, which had to be fired about ten times at an enamel sign factory in Sydenham.
More images	The Window Cleaner	Capital House, Chapel Street 51.5195°N 0.1674°W	1990	Allan Sly	—N/a	Statue	—N/a	30 November 1990. Sly's brief was "for a figure expressing a wry sense of humour"; thus the window cleaner looks up at the 15 or so storeys of Capital House, for which his small ladder will be of little use.
More images	Cristos	St Christopher's Place 51.5151°N 0.1500°W	1993	William Pye	—N/a	Fountain with sculpture	—N/a	Unveiled 13 July 1993. The piece refers obliquely to the legend of Saint Christopher carrying the Christ child across a river; here the water, in the sculptor's words, "becomes the bridge itself", coursing down the arches of an open bronze structure into four small basins at the bottom and thence into grills in the pavement.
More images	Memorial to Raoul Wallenberg	Great Cumberland Place 51.5150°N 0.1596°W	1997	Philip Jackson	—N/a	Statue with screen	—N/a	Unveiled 26 February 1997 by Elizabeth II. Wallenberg stands in front of a screen formed from stacked passports; his head is turned towards the Western Marble Arch Synagogue. Another cast of the memorial is in Buenos Aires.
More images	Darcey Bussell, also known as Girl or Dancer with Ribbon	The Plaza, 116–132 Oxford Street	1997	Michael Rizzello		Architectural sculpture		
More images	Statue of Sherlock Holmes	Marylebone Road, outside Baker Street tube station 51.5225°N 0.1566°W	1999	John Doubleday	—N/a	Statue	—N/a	Unveiled 23 September 1999. No site was available on Baker Street itself, but the Abbey National building society, whose head office was on the putative site of No. 221B, agreed to fund the statue.
More images	Statue of Władysław Sikorski	Outside the Polish Embassy, Portland Place 51.5211°N 0.1454°W	2000	Faith Winter	Michael Goss	Statue	—N/a	Unveiled 24 September 2003 by the Duke of Kent. Tomasz Zamoyski, a prominent Polish expatriate, first conceived the idea for the statue to complement the existing statues of Churchill, Eisenhower and de Gaulle in London. The British and Polish governments each gave £5,000 towards the cost.
	Tyburn, Lethewards has sunk	Cramer Street 51.5193°N 0.1523°W	2000	Robert Dawson	—N/a	Tile murals	—N/a	Installed as part of Westminster City Council's Hidden Rivers public art project.
	Thames North and Thames South	Outside 199 Old Marylebone Road 51.5200°N 0.1657°W	2001	Hamish Black	—N/a	Sculptures	—N/a	Sculptures formed from sheets of galvanised steel stacked on top of one another.
	Westminster Double	Richbourne Court, Harrowby Street	2003	Hamish Black		Architectural sculpture		
	Relief	40 Portman Square	2006	John Carter	Squire and Partners	Architectural sculpture	—N/a	An abstract relief, described as a "paperclip sculpture", in Portland stone.
	Nexus	Outside York House, Seymour Street 51.5143°N 0.1599°W	2007	Robert Orchardson	—N/a	Sculpture	—N/a	Six soaring diamond-shaped forms in steel, painted black.
	Armillary Sphere sundial	Paddington Street Gardens, centre of the southern part 51°31′13″N 0°09′15″W	c. 2007–2008	?	—N/a	Sculpture	—N/a	Sundial in the form of an armillary sphere; the supporting plinth is a former drinking fountain. The sphere of c. 2007–2008 is a replacement of an earlier one.
	Field Work	7 Portman Mews South	2009	Shauna McMullan	Garnett and Partners	Architectural sculpture	—N/a	A carving of meadow grasses, alluding to this area's largely agricultural character before the mid-18th century.
	Fibonacci Flip	The London Clinic Cancer Centre, 22 Devonshire Place	2010	Peter Randall-Page		Architectural sculpture	—N/a	
	Visitor	Cavendish Square Gardens	2010	David Breuer-Weil	—N/a	Sculpture	—N/a	
	Sculpture	11 Baker Street	2011	Alexander Beleschenko	Squire and Partners	Glass sculpture	—N/a	
	Royal arms	Westminster Magistrates' Court	2011	?	Hurd Rolland Partnership	Architectural sculpture	—N/a	
More images	Wrapper	Edgware Road tube station (Circle and other lines) 51.5200°N 0.1667°W	2012	Jacqueline Poncelet	—N/a	Vitreous enamel cladding	—N/a	The largest vitreous enamel artwork in Europe, decorating a new building and perimeter wall next to the station with patterns inspired by research undertaken in the area.
	Sculpture	10 Portman Square	2014	Kate Maestri	Jestico + Whiles	Ceramic enamel sculpture on glass	—N/a	Commissioned by British Land.
	Forest Under the Flyover	Marylebone Flyover 51.5200°N 0.1700°W	2016	Manou Bendon	—N/a	Stencil	—N/a	Commissioned by Transport for London.
	Singing on Paddington Street	The Chilterns, 24 Paddington Street	2016	Julia Vogl	Squire and Partners	Architectural sculpture	—N/a	The vertical slats of different colours represent record sleeves on shelves, in reference to the Beatles' Apple Boutique which was situated a few doors down from this building.
More images	Cadence	Chiltern Square, Paddington Street	2017	Owen Bullett	—N/a	Sculpture	—N/a	
More images	Statue of George Orwell	Broadcasting House	2017	Martin Jennings	—N/a	Statue	—N/a	Unveiled 7 November 2017. The wall behind is inscribed with a quotation from Animal Farm (1945): If liberty means anything at all it means the right to tell people what they do not want to hear.
More images	There and Now	Westminster Magistrates Court	2017	Bex Simon	—N/a	Architectural sculpture	—N/a	
	Ohisama Sushi Rising Sun Mural	Kenrick Place	2020	Andrea Beltrame	—N/a	Mural	—N/a	
More images	Bust of Adrian Shooter	Marylebone station	2022	Luke Perry	—N/a	Bust	—N/a	Unveiled 30 August 2022.

== Regent's Park ==
Part of Regent's Park lies outside the City of Westminster; for works not listed here see the List of public art in Camden.

Regent's Park is one of London's Royal Parks, located partly in the London Borough of Camden and partly in the City of Westminster. The sculptures in Queen Mary's Gardens (laid out in the 1930s within the Inner Circle or Regent's Park) were bequeathed by the artist Sigismund Goetze, who lived nearby at Grove House from 1907 until his death in 1939. In 1944 his widow Constance Goetze established a trust fund in his memory, known as the Constance Fund, for the financing of new sculpture in London's parks.

Image	Title / subject	Location and coordinates	Date	Artist / designer	Architect / other	Type	Designation	Notes
More images	Eagle	Queen Mary's Gardens, near the Island Rock Garden 51.5266°N 0.1530°W	early 19th century	Anonymous; thought to be Japanese	—N/a	Statue	Grade II	Naturalistic bronze statue of an eagle, with wings outspread, landing on a rock. Presented to the Royal Parks in 1974.
More images	Lion Tazza	Avenue Gardens 51.5267°N 0.1482°W	1863	Austin and Seeley	—N/a	Stone bowl supported by sculpted winged lions	—N/a	
More images	Readymoney Drinking Fountain Cowasji Jehangir Readymoney	Broad Walk 51.5328°N 0.1507°W	1869	Henry Ross	Robert Keirle	Drinking fountain	Grade II	A gift from the Indian industrialist, in thanks for the protection of the Parsis under British rule. Unveiled by Princess Mary of Teck.
More images	Hylas and the Nymph	St John's Lodge garden 51.5292°N 0.1516°W	1894	Henry Alfred Pegram	—N/a	Fountain with sculptural group	Grade II	Originally titled The Bather. Part of the formal "Dutch" or "Old English" garden in front of St John’s Lodge. Presented to the park in 1933.
	Boys with armorial shields	St John's Lodge Garden	1894 and later	William Goscombe John and Harold Youngman	—N/a	Sculptures	Grade II (north piers, south piers)	Probably installed for the Marquess of Bute, to whom the lease for St John's Lodge was sold in 1888. Three of the figures are by Goscombe John and date to 1894; one, by Youngman, is of 1938 and the remaining two are undated.
More images	The Lost Bow	Queen Mary's Gardens 51.5273°N 0.1527°W	1913	Albert Hodge	—N/a	Sculpture	Grade II	Ornamental sculpture of a putto sitting astride a vulture, believed to have been commissioned by Sigismund Goetze for Grove House. Presented to Queen Mary's Gardens in 1939.
More images	A Mighty Hunter	Queen Mary's Gardens 51.5275°N 0.1524°W	1913	Albert Hodge	—N/a	Sculpture	Grade II	Bronze sculpture of a putto wrestling with a duck, a pendant to The Lost Bow. (See above.)
More images	The Goatherd's Daughter Gertrude and Harold Baillie-Weaver	St John's Lodge garden 51.5294°N 0.1515°W	1922	Charles Leonard Hartwell	—N/a	Statue	Grade II	The statue was first exhibited in 1929, when it won the silver medal of the Royal British Society of Sculptors. It was erected on this site in 1931 by the National Council for Animal Welfare, in honour of its founders.
More images	Jubilee Gates	Queen Mary's Gardens 51.5283°N 0.1513°W	1935	—N/a	—N/a	Gates	Grade II	The gates commemorate the Silver Jubilee of George V and the official opening of Queen Mary's Gardens.
	Boy and Frog	Queen Mary's Gardens 51.5273°N 0.1545°W	1936 (donated)	William Reid Dick	—N/a	Fountain with sculpture	Grade II	A gift of Sigismund Goetze.
More images	Triton Sigismund Goetze	Queen Mary's Gardens 51.5289°N 0.1531°W	1936	William McMillan	—N/a	Fountain with sculptural group	Grade II	Due to the Second World War the fountain was not installed until 1950, when it was awarded a gold medal award for the best sculpture exhibited in London that year. The site was formerly occupied by a large conservatory belonging to the Royal Botanic Society, demolished in 1931.
	Memorial to Anne Sharpley	St John's Lodge garden 51.5290°N 0.1515°W	after 1989	—N/a	—N/a	Urn	—N/a	Plinth inscribed In affectionate/ memory of/ ANNE SHARPLEY/ 1928–1989/ journalist/ who/ loved this garden. Sharpley was a reporter for the Evening Standard.
	Plaque commemorating restoration of gardens	Broad Walk 51.5267°N 0.1479°W	1996	Richard Kindersley	—N/a	Plaque in pavement	—N/a	Inscribed THIS PLAQUE CELEBRATES THE RESTORATION OF THE AVENUE GARDENS BETWEEN 1993 & 1996. THESE GARDENS WERE DESIGNED BY WILLIAM ANDREWS NESFIELD, 1794–1881 & CREATED BETWEEN 1863 & 1865.
	Plaque commemorating the Regent's Park victims of the Hyde Park and Regent's Park bombings of 20 July 1982	Bandstand 51.5265°N 0.1574°W	1982	—N/a	—N/a	Plaque on wall	—N/a	Inscribed TO THE MEMORY OF/ THOSE BANDSMEN OF THE 1ST BATTALION/ THE ROYAL GREEN JACKETS/ WHO DIED AS THE RESULT OF A TERRORIST ATTACK/ HERE ON THE 20TH JULY 1982.
More images	The Awakening Anne Lydia Evans	St John's Lodge garden 51.5290°N 0.1511°W	1998	Unus Safardiar	—N/a	Sculpture	—N/a	Plinth inscribed THE AWAKENING/ IN/ FOND MEMORY OF/ ANNE LYDIA EVANS/ 1929–1999/ WHO SHARED/ THE SECRET/ OF THIS GARDEN. Evans was a general practitioner in Marylebone who campaigned to improve the medical care of victims of torture.
	Girl and the Jaguar, Fox and the Girl, Boy and Butterflies	Regent's Park 51.5339°N 0.1589°W	2010	Tom Harvey	—N/a	Sculptures	—N/a	The sculptor worked with a pupils from St James's and St Michael's Primary Schools to come up with ideas for the sculptures.

=== London Zoo ===
Image	Title / subject	Location and coordinates	Date	Artist / designer	Architect / other	Type	Designation	Notes
More images	Stealing the Cubs	West of Three Island Pond 51.5350°N 0.1529°W	1906 (erected)	Henri Teixeira de Mattos	—N/a	Sculptural group	—N/a	Donated to the Zoological Society of London by J. B. Wolff in 1906.
More images	London Zoo War Memorial	Outside the Butterfly House 51.5350°N 0.1524°W	1919	—N/a	John James Joass	War memorial	Grade II	Based on a medieval Lanterne des Morts, a memorial to the dead in La Souterraine in the Creuse Valley, France. Joass was also the co-designer, with Peter Chalmers Mitchell, of the Zoo's Mappin Terraces, built 1913–14.
	Lion's head	New Lion Terraces	c. 1970	William Timym	—N/a	Sculpture	—N/a	Presented to the Zoo by the sculptor in September 1976. Also on the New Lion Terraces is another sculpted head of a lion, a fragment from the demolished Lion House of 1875–76.
	Bear Cub or Winnie Memorial Winnipeg the Bear	Behind the Reptile House 51.5349°N 0.1563°W	1981	Lorne McKean	—N/a	Statue	—N/a	Unveiled by Christopher Robin Milne in September 1981, the statue commemorates Winnie-the-Pooh's namesake, a black bear cub which lived in London Zoo from 1915 until her death in 1934. The statue was a gift from the Trustees of Pooh Properties.
More images	Statue of Guy the Gorilla	Near main entrance 51.5356°N 0.1560°W	1982	William Timym	—N/a	Statue	—N/a	Unveiled 10 November 1982. A gift from Timym, the statue originally stood on the south side of the Michael Sobell Pavilions for Apes and Monkeys, but by 2009 it had been moved to its current site.
More images	Globe Sundial	Next to the Macaw Aviary 51.5348°N 0.1520°W	1989	Wendy Taylor	—N/a	Sundial	—N/a	Plaque inscribed This Globe Sundial shows in miniature how the Earth/ is bathed in sunlight./ Time is indicated by the fin which casts the least shadow./ The combination of the tilt of the earth's axis and the/ varying speed of its progress on an elliptical path around/ the sun causes a difference between the time shown and/ mean time of up to 16 minutes. The greatest differences/ occur in February and October. A work in aluminium on a brick pedestal, it was a gift of Alcan Aluminium Ltd.
	Dove	Members' Lawn 51.5357°N 0.1542°W	c. 1990	—N/a	—N/a	Sculpture	—N/a	
	New Life	In front of Education building 51.5365°N 0.1580°W	1990	Willi Soukop	—N/a	Sculpture	—N/a	
More images	Ambika Paul Memorial Fountain	Ambika Paul Children's Zoo 51.5348°N 0.1535°W	1994	Shenda Amery	—N/a	Fountain with sculpture	—N/a	Ambika Paul was the daughter of Swraj Paul, later a peer, who funded the Children’s Zoo named in her memory. She died of leukaemia, aged 5, in 1968.
More images	Harry Colebourn and Winnipeg the Bear	Children's Zoo (behind café) 51.5334°N 0.1526°W	1995 (unveiled)	Bill Epp	—N/a	Sculptural group	—N/a	This second memorial to the inspiration for Winnie-the-Pooh shows the bear with the Canadian soldier who donated her to the Zoo; A cast of a group originally unveiled in Assiniboine Park Zoo, Winnipeg, Manitoba, Canada, in 1992. The model for the figure of Colebourn was his son, Fred.
More images	Unseen Prey	Members' Lawn 51.5357°N 0.1542°W	c. 1999	Shenda Amery	—N/a	Sculptural group	—N/a	Amery's website gives the following commentary on the work: "Here the artist is expressing the violent force of nature, but without malice. We see two cheetahs frozen in the moment of their pursuit, their prey is unseen. The outcome of the chase is invariably the kill, but the cheetahs are working in co-operation and are hunting out of necessity in order to survive."
More images	Dung Beetles	B.U.G.S. 51.5342°N 0.1517°W	1999	Wendy Taylor	—N/a	Sculptural group	—N/a	Unveiled July 1999 by Elizabeth II when opening the Web of Life exhibition, now called B.U.G.S.
More images	Bust of Swraj Paul, Baron Paul	Ambika Paul Children's Zoo 51.5340°N 0.1543°W	2002 (erected)	Sadiq	—N/a	Bust	—N/a	A donation of £1m from Paul, an Indian-born industrialist, prevented the Zoo from being closed down in 1992.
	Sundial	Thames Water Garden	2003	David Harber	—N/a	Sundial	—N/a	
	Gorillas	Gorilla Kingdom	2007	Bruce Pollin	—N/a	Sculptures	—N/a	
More images	Clock	Blackburn Pavilion (Tropical Aviary) 51.5336°N 0.1521°W	2008	Tim Hunkin	—N/a	Animated clock	—N/a	The result of a commission on the theme of Victorian attitudes towards nature, Hunkin’s clock takes inspiration from the work of the cartoonist Saul Steinberg and from Rowland Emett’s Guinness Clock for the 1951 Festival of Britain.
More images	Giant Tortoise	Giant tortoises display 51.5347°N 0.1558°W	2009	Owen Cunningham	—N/a	Sculpture	—N/a	
More images	Boris the Polar Bear	Broad Walk, near the Amphitheatre 51.5353°N 0.1536°W	2012	Adam Binder	—N/a	Statue	—N/a	Originally displayed for a month in Sloane Square, the life-size bronze statue of a polar bear then became a permanent fixture at the Zoo.
	Hari and his Mother	Entrance to Tiger Territory 51.5347°N 0.1548°W	2013	Linden Hamilton	—N/a	Sculptural group	—N/a	This replaced a statue by Carol Orwin titled Meow or Newborn Tiger Cub which was previously on the site.
	Hari Stretches	Tiger Territory 51.5347°N 0.1562°W	2013	Christine Close	—N/a	Statue	—N/a	A copper and bronze resin sculpture of a tiger stretching itself.
	Pouncer	Tiger Territory 51.5348°N 0.1551°W	2013	Carol Orwin	—N/a	Sculptures	—N/a	A bronze statue of a tiger cub learning to hunt, its eyes set on a flying frog.
	Territorial Challenge	Tiger Territory 51.5341°N 0.1550°W	2013	Teresa Martin	—N/a	Statue	—N/a	An iron and marble resin statue of a tiger on its hind legs, fighting.
More images	Tiger Going for a Swim	Tiger Territory 51.5342°N 0.1548°W	2013	Christy Symington	—N/a	Sculpture	—N/a	A bronze resin sculpture of a partly submerged tiger.
	Pygmy Hippopotamus	London Zoo	2014	Linden Hamilton	—N/a	Sculpture	—N/a	
	Statue of Ming the Giant Panda	Entrance to the Casson Pavilion	2015	?	—N/a	Statue	—N/a	Unveiled 21 October 2015. A plaque in English and Chinese is behind the statue; the English reads: Ming was a giant panda who lived at ZSL London and Whipsnade Zoos from 1938 to 1944. During the Second World War she became a symbol of friendship and stability as Londoners suffered under the Blitz. Thousands of children visited her until her death in 1944. This statue is offered on the 70th anniversary of the end of World War II as a symbol of the enduring friendship between China and the UK, presented by the people of Sichuan.
	Sirona Joan Beauchamp Procter	Opposite Tiny Giants	2026	Linder	—N/a	Mosaic	—N/a	Commissioned to mark the zoo's bicentenary, the mosaic shows an Ethiopian mountain adder and a sample of Procter's handwriting from a letter to her sister.

==== Works no longer on public display ====
Image	Title / subject	Location and coordinates	Date	Artist / designer	Architect / other	Type	Designation	Notes
	Bear and Child	London Zoo	1928	"E. M. A."	—N/a	Sculptural group	—N/a	Donated to the Zoological Society of London by Constance Goetze in memory of her husband. The sculpture's location within the Zoo changed several times; in 2013 it took up residence in the ZSL's library.
More images	The Seated Hand	Next to the Macaw Aviary 51.5354°N 0.1521°W	1988	Diane Maclean	—N/a	Sculpture	—N/a	

== St John's Wood ==
St John's Wood, a suburban area of mainly Victorian buildings in the northern extremity of the City of Westminster, was declared a conservation area in 1968.

Image	Title / subject	Location and coordinates	Date	Artist / designer	Architect / other	Type	Designation	Notes
More images	Memorial to Edward Onslow Ford	Abbey Road / Grove End Road 51.5319°N 0.1771°W	1903	Andrea Carlo Lucchesi	John William Simpson	Obelisk with sculpture	Grade II	Unveiled 13 July 1903. At the front of the memorial is a casting of Onslow Ford's own Muse from his Shelley Memorial in University College, Oxford; behind is a portrait head of the sculptor by Lucchesi.
More images	Grace Gates W. G. Grace	Lord's Cricket Ground 51.5283°N 0.1732°W	1923	—N/a	Herbert Baker	Gates	Grade II	Two pairs of gates set in an exedra of Portland stone.
More images	Father Time	Lord's Cricket Ground 51.5288°N 0.1722°W	1926	—N/a	Herbert Baker	Weathervane	—N/a	A gift by Baker, the architect of the Grandstand, to the Marylebone Cricket Club and Lord's. Moved to the Mound Stand in 1996 to allow for the demolition of Baker's Grandstand and the construction of its replacement by Nicholas Grimshaw.
More images	Sporting figures	Lord's Cricket Ground, Wellington Road 51.5301°N 0.1693°W	1934	Gilbert Bayes	—N/a	Bas-relief	Grade II	13 sportspeople, including tennis players, golfers, cricketers, swimmers, oarsmen and footballers are depicted in a procession. The inscription PLAY UP PLAY UP AND PLAY THE GAME is taken from Henry Newbolt's poem "Vitaï Lampada" (1892). The setting was remodelled in 1995–1996.
More images	St Marylebone War Memorial	St John's Wood roundabout, top of Park Road 51.530°N 0.1679°W	c. 1935	Charles Leonard Hartwell	—N/a	Equestrian statue	Grade II	Hartwell designed the bronze group of Saint George spearing the dragon for a war memorial in Newcastle upon Tyne, commissioned by Earl Haig. This later casting was a gift of Sigismund Goetze.
	Memorial to Alice Drakoules	St John's Wood Churchyard	1937	—N/a	—N/a	Bird bath with relief sculpture	—N/a	Alice Drakoules was the treasurer of the Humanitarian League who lived near this site, at Regent's Park; the relief depicts a stag, a fox, a heron, a squirrel, a horse, a cat and a dog, representing the broad compass of the organisation's work.
	Saint John the Baptist	St John's Wood Church 51.5306°N 0.1681°W	1977	Hans Feibusch	—N/a	Statue	—N/a	Primarily a muralist, Feibusch turned to sculpture in 1970 as his eyesight began to decline. He produced a John the Baptist in cast resin in 1973. This cast of 1977 was installed to mark the completion of the church's new hall.
More images	Statue of W. G. Grace	Lord's Cricket Ground	2000	Louis Laumen	—N/a	Statue	—N/a	
More images	The Batsman	Lord's Cricket Ground	2001	Gerald Laing	—N/a	Statue	—N/a	
More images	The Bowler	Lord's Cricket Ground	2002	Antony Dufort	—N/a	Statue	—N/a	A figure of a cricketer in the first stage of the "follow through" position.
	Two reliefs	Embassy Court, 45 Wellington Road	c. 2009	Sam Kiel	Piers Gough (CZWG)	Architectural sculpture	—N/a	
	Memorial to Rachael Heyhoe Flint	Heyhoe Flint Gate, Lord's Cricket Ground, St John's Wood Road	2022	Robert Hunt	—N/a	Relief	—N/a	Unveiled 17 August 2025 by the pioneering female cricketer's son, Ben Flint.
	Sundial	Gardens of the Hospital of St John and St Elizabeth 51.5331°N 0.1758°W		?	—N/a	Sundial	—N/a	

== Bibliography ==
- Asprey, Ronald; Bullus, Claire (2009). The Statues of London. London and New York: Merrell.
- Blackwood, John (1989). London's Immortals: The Complete Outdoor Commemorative Statues. London and Oxford: Savoy Press.
- Byron, Arthur (1981). London Statues: A Guide to London's Outdoor Statues and Sculpture. London: Constable.
- Coke, David, ed. (1995). Hans Feibusch: The Heat of Vision. London: Lund Humphries.
- Matthews, Peter (2018). London's Statues and Monuments. Oxford: Shire Publications.
- Ovenden, Mark (2013). London Underground by Design. London: Penguin.
- Ward-Jackson, Philip (2011). Public Sculpture of Historic Westminster: Volume 1. Public Sculpture of Britain. Liverpool: Liverpool University Press.
