= Laura Ford =

British sculptor (born 1961)

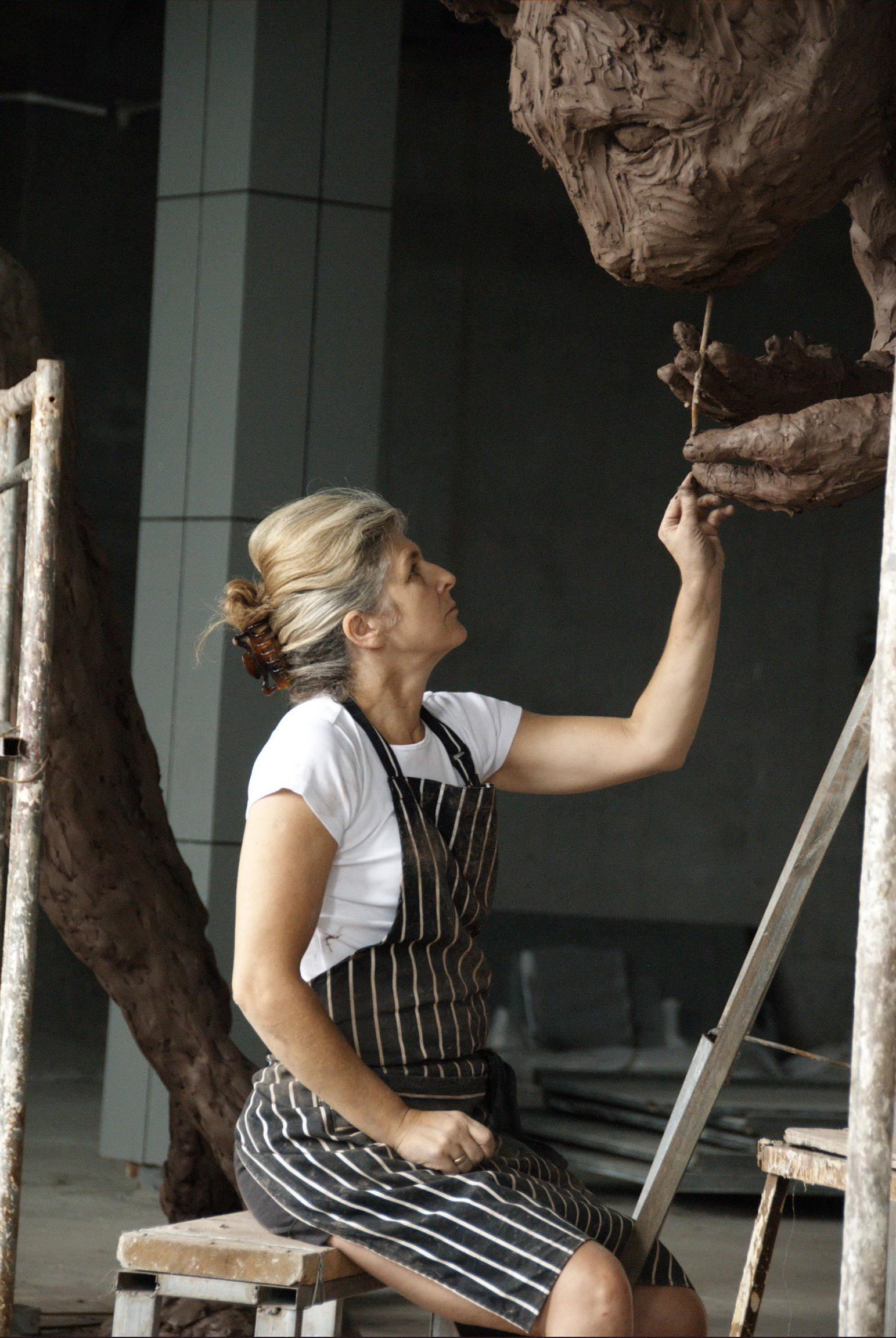
- Ford in 2012
- Born: 6 February 1961 (age 65); Cardiff, Wales, United Kingdom
- Education: Bath Academy of Art; Chelsea School of Art
- Known for: Sculpture
- Spouse: Andrew Sabin
- Website: www.lauraford.net

Laura Ford (born 6 February 1961 in Cardiff, Wales), is a British sculptor. She is currently president of the Royal Society of Sculptors.

== Early life ==
Growing up in a travelling fairground family, Ford was educated at Stonar School in Wiltshire, and then at Bath Academy of Art from 1978 to 1982, while spending a term at the Cooper Union School of Art in New York City. In 1982, she was invited to take part in the annual New Contemporaries exhibition at the Institute of Contemporary Arts and then studied at the Chelsea School of Art from 1982 to 1983.

== Work ==
Ford has lived and worked in London since 1982 and has been identified with the New British Sculpture movement since her participation in the 1983 survey exhibition The Sculpture Show at the Serpentine Gallery and The Hayward, as well as participating in the British Art Show 5 in 2000.

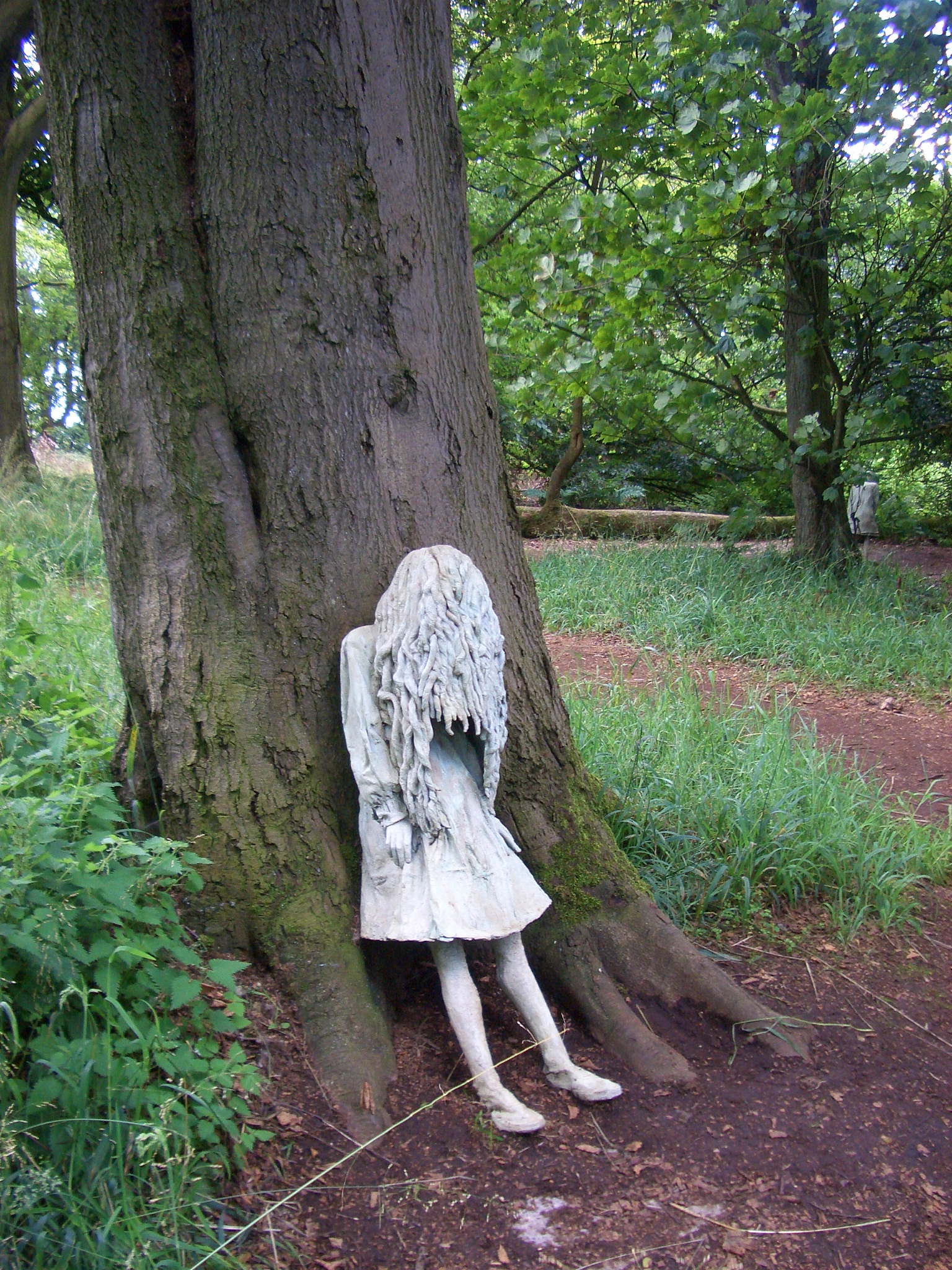
"Weeping Girls"

Marcello Spinelli wrote: "Ford's creatures are faithful representations of fantasy and, at times, a nightmarish imagination. With their bitter-sweet, menacing and endearing qualities, her stuffed animals and dolls appeal to childhood memories and inhabit a world we immediately recognize as somewhat familiar."

Her work is represented in many public collections, including the Tate Gallery, the Victoria and Albert Museum, the Government Art Collection, Potteries Museum, National Museums and Gallery of Wales; Museum of Modern Art, University of Iowa; the Arts Council of Great Britain; the Contemporary Art Society; Unilever; Penguin Books; Oldham Art Gallery, The New Art Gallery Walsall, The Glynn Vivian Art Gallery, Frederik Meijer Gardens & Sculpture Park in Grand Rapids, Michigan, USA, and Citygarden, St. Louis, MO, USA.

She has exhibited widely, including: Solo, 2012 Days of Judgement, Kulturzentrum Englische Kirche und Galerie Scheffel, Bad Homburg, and The New Art Centre, Roche Court, UK, 2011 Frederik Meijer Gardens & Sculpture Park, Grand Rapids, MI, USA, 2007, Rag and Bone, Turner Contemporary, Margate, 2006, Armour Boys, Royal Scottish Academy, Edinburgh, 2004, Wreckers, Beaconsfield, London, 2003, Ford Headthinkers, Houldsworth Gallery, Cork Street. 2002, The Great Indoors, Salamanca Centre of Contemporary Art, Spain, 1998, Camden Arts Centre, London (with Jacqui Poncelet) Group, 2011, with Magdalena Abakanowicz, at the Industriemuseum Westfälisches Landesmuseum, Bocholt, Germany, 2005, Venice Biennale for Wales, 2004, Into My World: Recent British Sculpture, Aldrich Museum of Contemporary Art in Connecticut, USA, with Matt Franks, Roger Hiorns, James Ireland, Jim Lambie, and Mike Nelson.

== Academic career ==
Between 1983 and 1995, Ford was a lecturer at Chelsea School of Art and Senior Lecturer at Middlesex University, also teaching extensively at most London art schools.

== Public commissions ==
- 2014: Southmeads Hospital, Bristol
- 2012: University Hospital, Heidelberg, Germany
- 2009: City Stockholm, Sweden
- 2007: "Look Ahead", Short-Term Housing Project
- 2006: "Weeping Girls", Jupiter Artland
- 2002: Swiss Cottage Children's Library, London
- 2001–02: Swiss Cottage Children’s Library, London
- 1998: British High Commission, Ottawa
- 1997: Surrey Docks/Dockland Development Agency
- 1993: "Chiltern Sculpture Trail", Oxford
- 1989–90: West Bromwich Town Centre, WBC/PADT

== Gallery ==
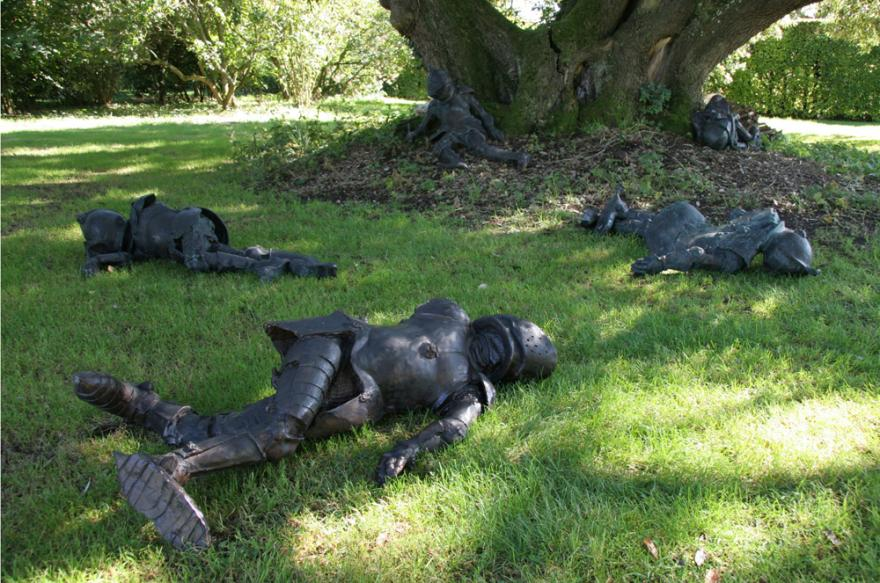
"Armour Boys", Houldsworth Gallery, 2006

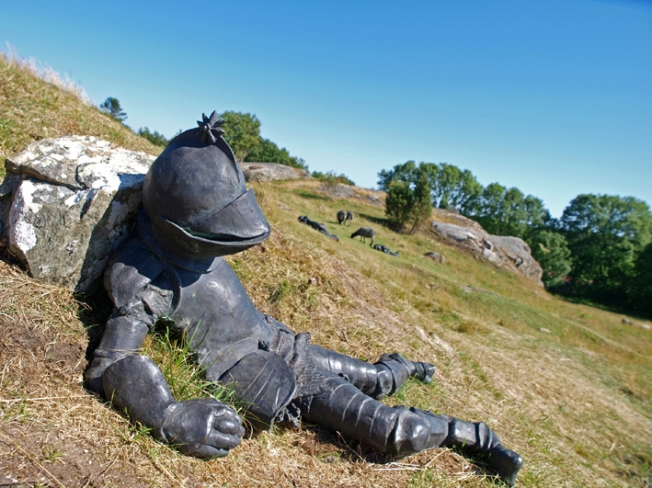
"Armour Boys" (installed at Sculpture in Pilane, Sweden), 2006

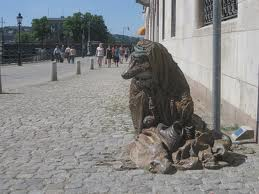
"Rag and Bone", Stockholm, 1998

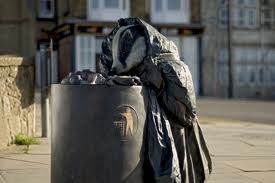
"Rag and Bone", 2007

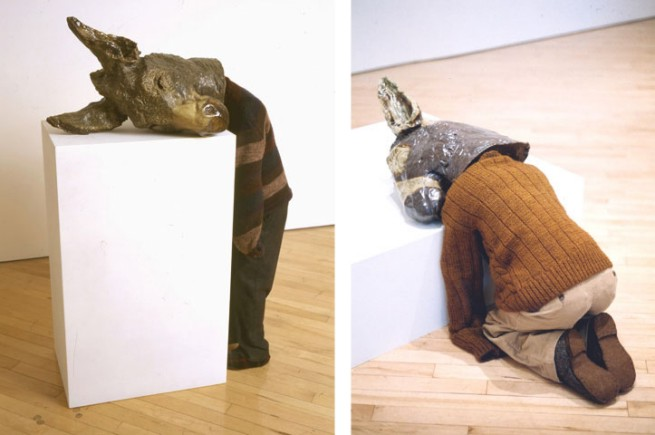
Houldsworth Gallery, London, 2003

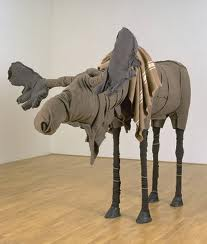
"Moose", 1998

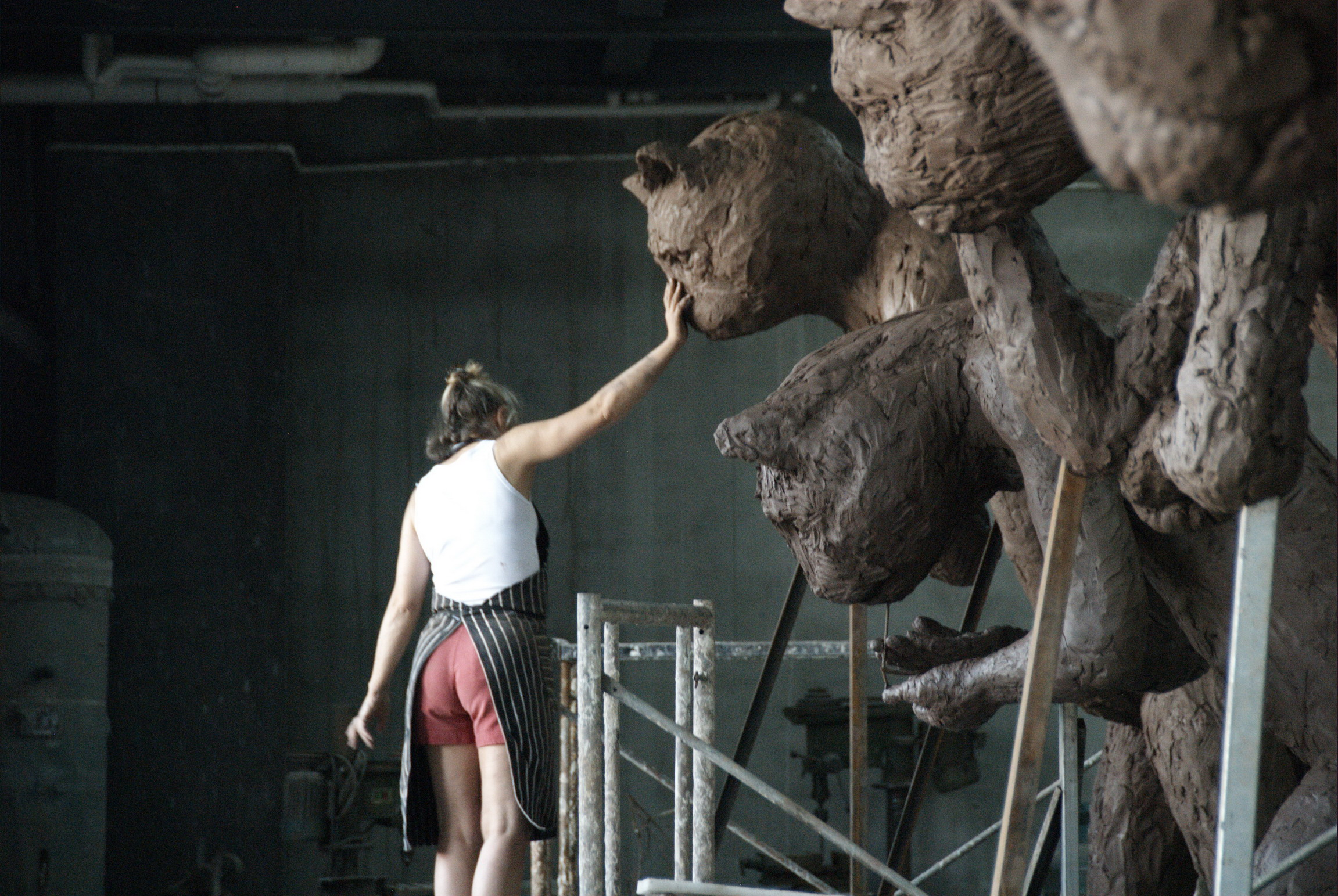
"China Cats"

== Personal life ==
Ford lives and works in Camden, London, alongside her husband, the sculptor Andrew Sabin, and their three children.
