= Keith Edmier =

American artist

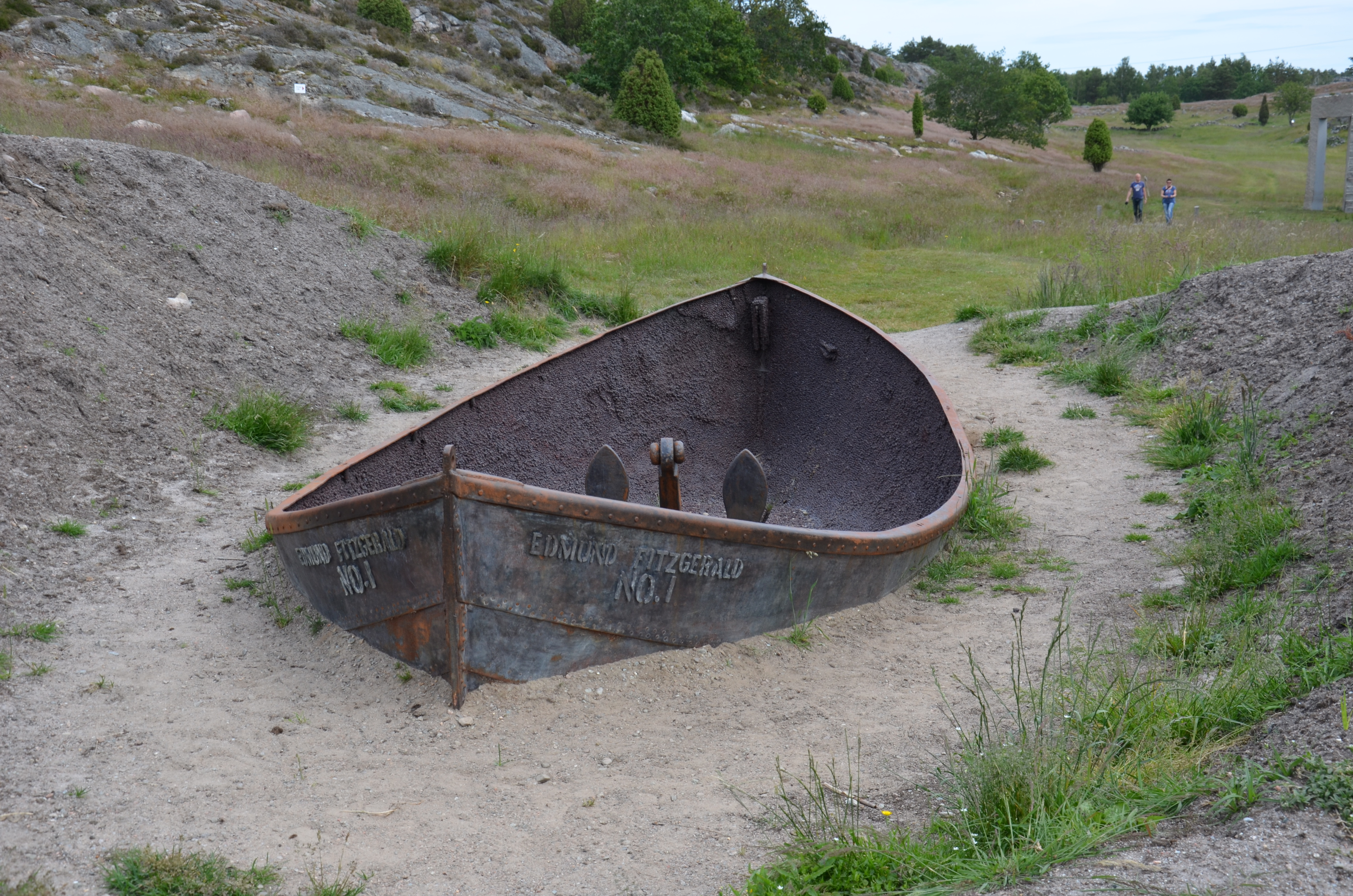
You gotta go out, you don´t have to come back, installation 2011 at Skulptur i Pilane Sculpture Park at Tjörn in Sweden

Keith Edmier (born September 6, 1967 in Chicago) is an American sculptor and actor.

== Early life ==
When he was four years old, Edmier and his parents moved to Tinley Park, Illinois, a southwest suburb of Chicago. They bought a home in the Bremen Towne Estates subdivision, which was a small village within a village, having its own shopping mall, theater and churches. He had an early interest in sculpting, making masks much like those used for special effects in films. In order to learn how to create vampire fangs, he got an after-school job with a dental lab, where he learned how to use acrylics and molding techniques.

While still a student at Victor J. Andrew High School, he managed to strike up a correspondence with Hollywood makeup artist Dick Smith. After an early graduation from high school, Edmier set off for Hollywood, where he began learning more by working on movies such as The Fly. Edmier also attended the California Institute of the Arts for a brief period.

== Career and Artistic Themes ==
Edmier worked in film, with the intention of becoming an artist, moving to New York to pursue that goal in 1990. He became an assistant to Matthew Barney

Many of Edmier's works have very close personal connections to his life. He embarked on the creation of the exhibit "Bremen Towne", where he recreated in exact detail, his childhood home and the family's rooms in it. While his parents had sold the home and were now living in nearby Orland Park, Illinois, they contacted the present owner, who agreed to grant Edmier access to the home where he grew up. The construction of the life-size rooms took the artist over a year. It was shown by Petzel Galleries in 2008 and was part of the group show Lifelike that originated at the Walker Art Center in 2012.

From October 2007 - February 2008, Edmier held a seminal exhibition at the Center for Curatorial Studies at Bard: Ranging from Edmier’s earliest works, such as I Met a Girl Who Sang the Blues(1991) through Bremen Towne, Keith Edmier: 1991-2007 presents a remarkable overview of Edmier’s work. It demonstrates not only the power of the artist’s use of his autobiographical landscape as a foil for considering a collective experience, but also his technical expertise as a sculptor. Many of Edmier’s works build upon and expose the intersections between his personal world and such American cultural touchstones as motorcycle stuntman Evel Knievel and 70s icon Farrah Fawcett, with whom he collaborated, as well as Janis Joplin and John Lennon. “Through the act of sculpture he voraciously pursues his memories,” writes curator Tom Eccles, citing both Jill Peters (1997), a “virginal portrait of his childhood sweetheart standing awkwardly in her sweater, skirt, and bobby socks” constructed in wax from a yearbook picture, and Beverly Edmier, 1967 (1998), a portrait of the artist’s mother, in which the yet-to-be-born artist is revealed through the stomach of his seated mother.

Edmier continued with exhibits that were close to his childhood. Also in 2008, Edmier exhibited his "& Episode 1" at the art museum on the campus of the University of New York at Albany. The exhibits featured children's shows familiar to most Chicagoans: Bozo's Circus, The BJ and Dirty Dragon Show, and The Ray Rayner Show. Edmier's special bond with Rayner came from his sending a drawing to the show as a young boy. Rayner, who showed all drawings on camera sent to him by his show's viewers, gave the budding artist his first showing to the tune of bells being rung by those in the crew as a sign of his good work. For the exhibit, which ran from July 10 to September 21, 2008, Edmier reconstructed the old Rayner show set by using photos and set designer's sketches provided to him by WGN-TV. To make the set seem authentic, the chalk board was updated daily with Chicago sports results and weather forecasts, as was done when the show was on the air. He also kept the set's clock set to the Central Time Zone. Edmier was able to arrange for the loan of many of the puppets and other important items from the television shows through the Museum of Broadcast Communications.

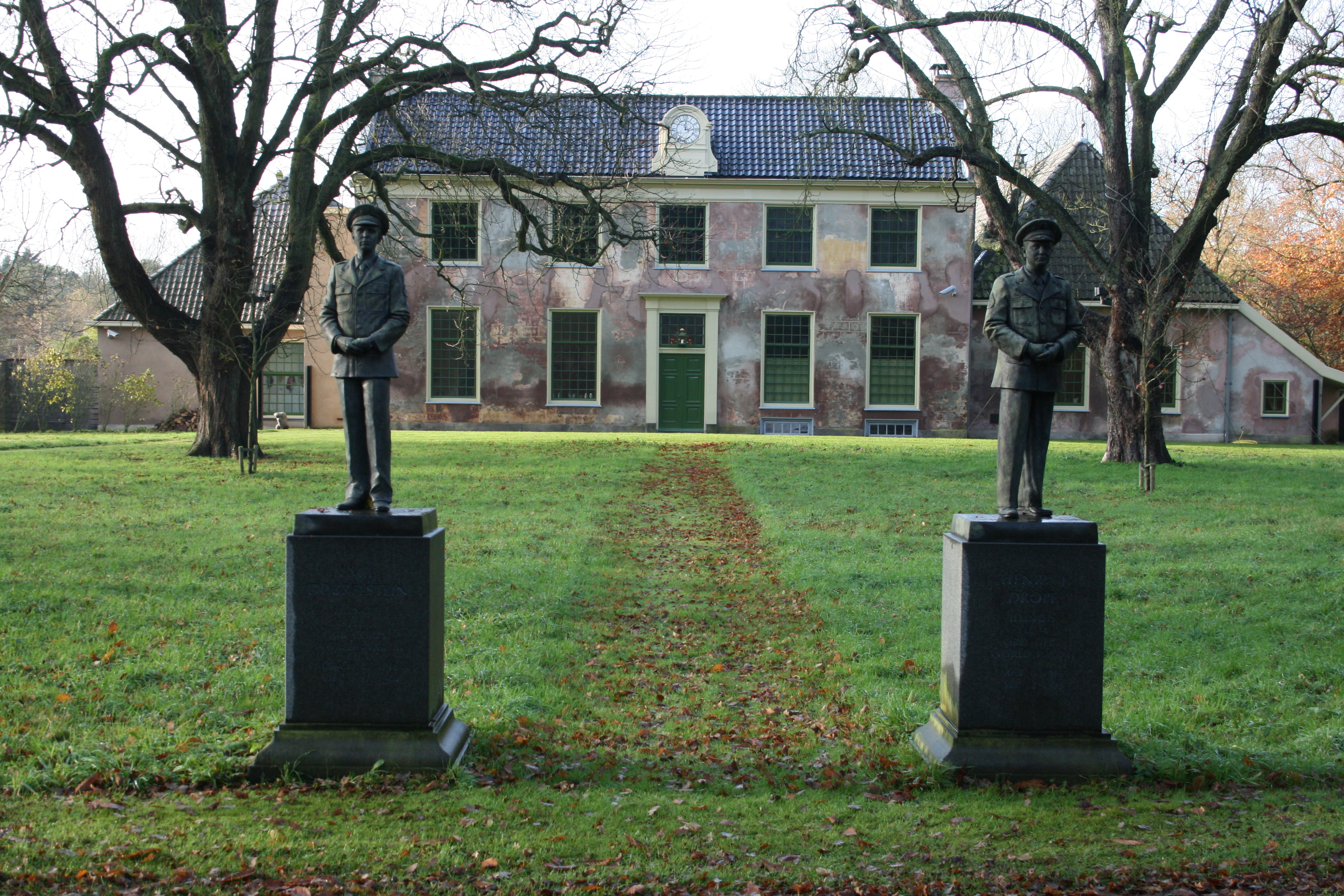
Bronze statues of Emil Dobbelstein and Henry J. Drope, 1944, in front of the estate Groot Bentveld, Zandvoort, the Netherlands, 2011

Edmier has produced many publications including Keith Edmier 1991-2007, an in-depth look at Edmier's work published in conjunction with the exhibition at CCS Bard including essays by Tom Eccles, Douglas Fogle, and Caoimhin Mac Giolla Leith; Regeneratrix published on the occasion of the exhibition Regeneratrix, at Petzel, New York, May 9 - June 20, 2015; Keith Edmier and Farrah Fawcett: Recasting Pygmalion, which chronicles the period in August 2000, after Edmier extended a formal invitation to the actress to join him in making a work of art, Edmier and Fawcett began what would become a two-year collaboration which produced several sculptures (including two large-scale nude sculptures of each other) and numerous photographs and drawings; and Keith Edmier: Emil Dobbelstein and Henry J. Drope, 1944 commissioned by Public Art Fund, New York in 2002 as part of the Whitney Museum’s 2002 Biennial Exhibition.

Edmier's sculptures are in the collections of many museums of modern art, including the Tate Modern., The Stedelijk Museum, Walker Art Center, and Israel Museum.

== Works ==
- Evel Knievel (1996)
- Water Lily (1997)
- First and Second Night Blooms (1998)
- Snowdrops (1998)
- A Dozen Roses (1998)
- Beverly Edmier 1967 (1998)
- Paphiopedilum (2001)
- Contemporary Projects 7: Keith Edmier and Farrah Fawcett 2000 (2002–2003)
- Fireweed (2002–2003)

== See also ==
- Farrah Fawcett
