= Pilane =

Pilane may refer to:

- Pilane (Botswana)
- Pilane (Sweden)
