= Nottingham Place =

Street in the City of Westminster, London

Coordinates: 51°31′16.71″N 0°9′11.09″W

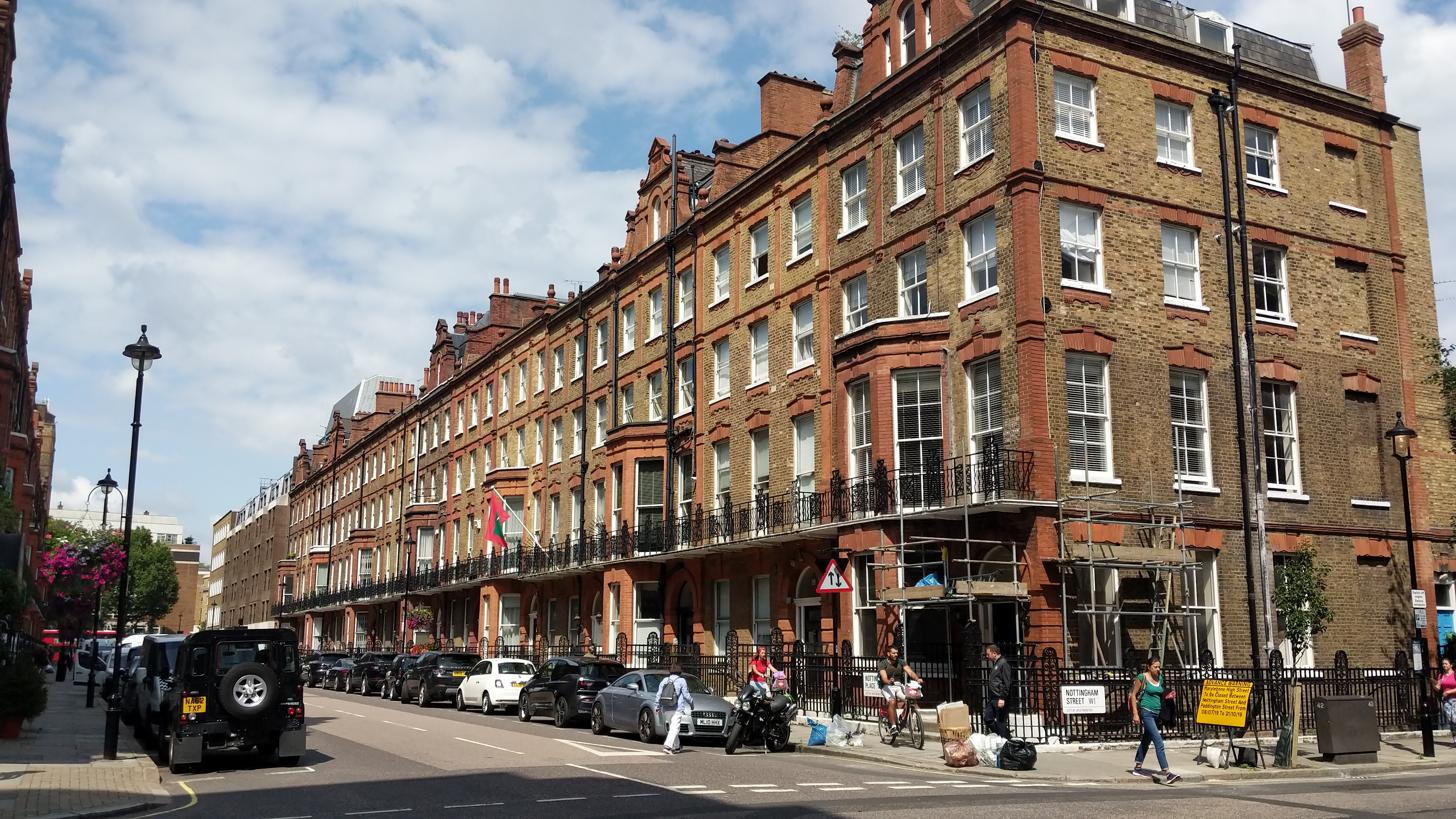
Nottingham Place

Nottingham Place is a street in the City of Westminster that runs from Marylebone Road in the north to Paddington Street in the south. The street was named after the Harley family estates in Nottinghamshire. Former residents include the social reformer Octavia Hill, who also had a school there, stained glass artist Charles Eamer Kempe, the London Bible College, and The Kashmir Klub. Current residents include the High Commission of the Maldives and the Latvian embassy.

== Origins and location ==
Nottingham Place is located in the City of Westminster. It runs from Marylebone Road in the north to Paddington Street in the south, and is crossed by Nottingham Street. It was named after the Harley family estates in Nottinghamshire.

== History ==
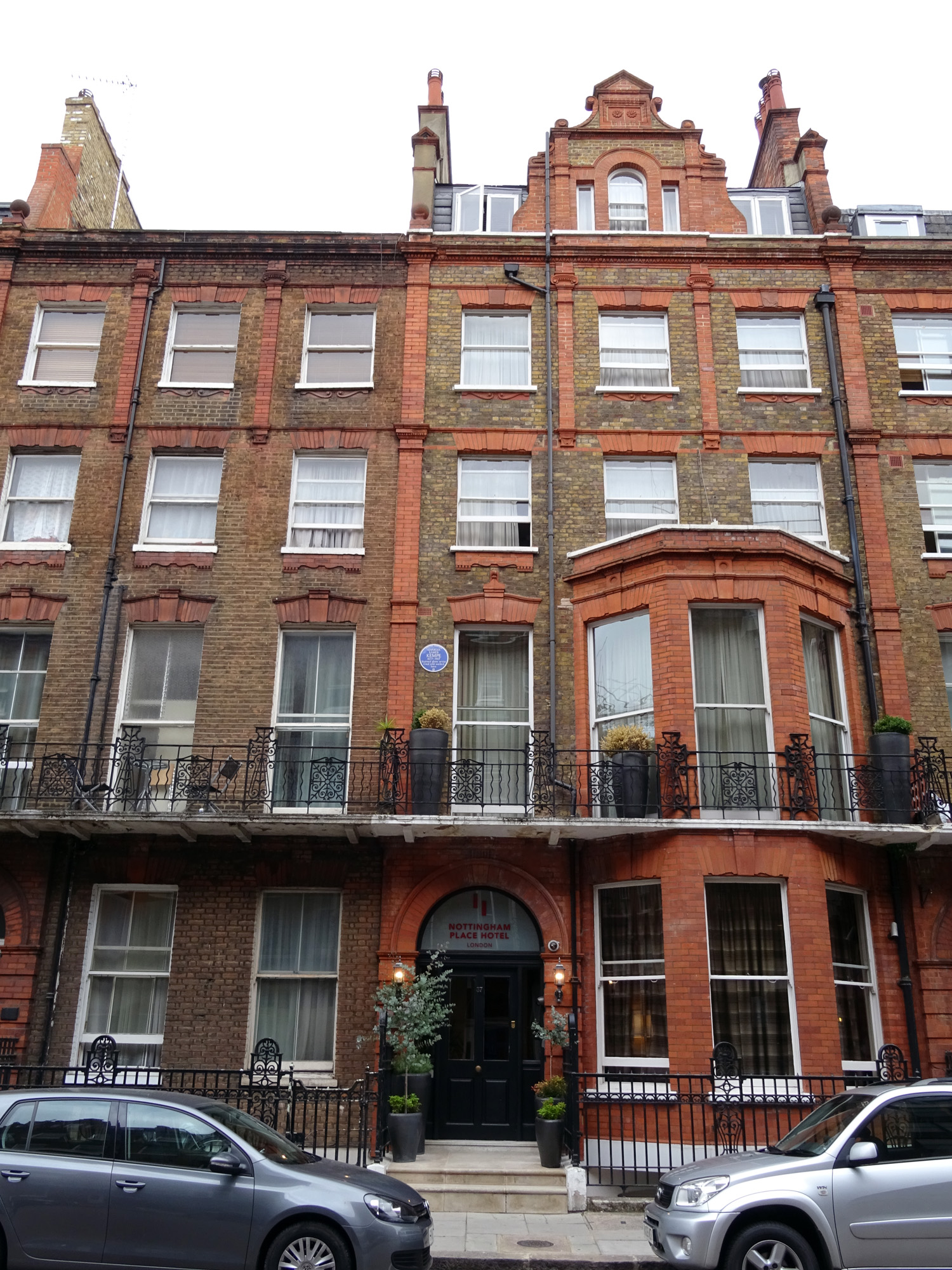
Former home of stained glass artist Charles Eamer Kempe at number 37 with plaque.

From 1860, the social reformer Octavia Hill lived in the street, and ran a school there. With the financial assistance of John Ruskin, Hill had planned to buy a house there with a garden for a children's playground and to let the building as tenements, and in February 1865 acquired 1, 2 and 3 Paradise Place, three houses, but without gardens.

Octavia Hill's sister ran a school there.

Stained glass artist Charles Eamer Kempe (1837-1907) lived and worked at number 37 Nottingham Place and a blue plaque marks the spot.

The London Bible College was based at no. 46, with a student hostel at no. 19, and later another at no. 17. By 1961, there were over 200 full-time and 300 part-time students, and further extensions were planned, but the London College of Divinity's Northwood campus was purchased instead, and the London Bible College moved there in 1970. The London Bible College premises were acquired by Heron Group, and it became their headquarters, until the mid-1980s, when most of what was now Heron House became an annex to the Princess Grace Hospital.

45 Nottingham Place was the headquarters of the Cremation Society of Great Britain.

The Kashmir Klub was at number six between 1997 and 2003.

The High Commission of the Republic of Maldives is at number 22, and the embassy of Latvia in the United Kingdom is located at number 45.

== Medical connections ==
Nottingham Place is strategically located among London's medical streets; Devonshire Road and Harley Street. The Royal Society of Medicine is within walking distance. Several medical women such as Florence Stoney moved there. Consulting rooms belonged to Julia Cock at number 15, Louisa Aldrich-Blake at number 17, and several other key figures of the London School of Medicine for Women.
