= Luxborough Street =

Street in the City of Westminster, London

Coordinates: 51.5216°N 0.1540°W

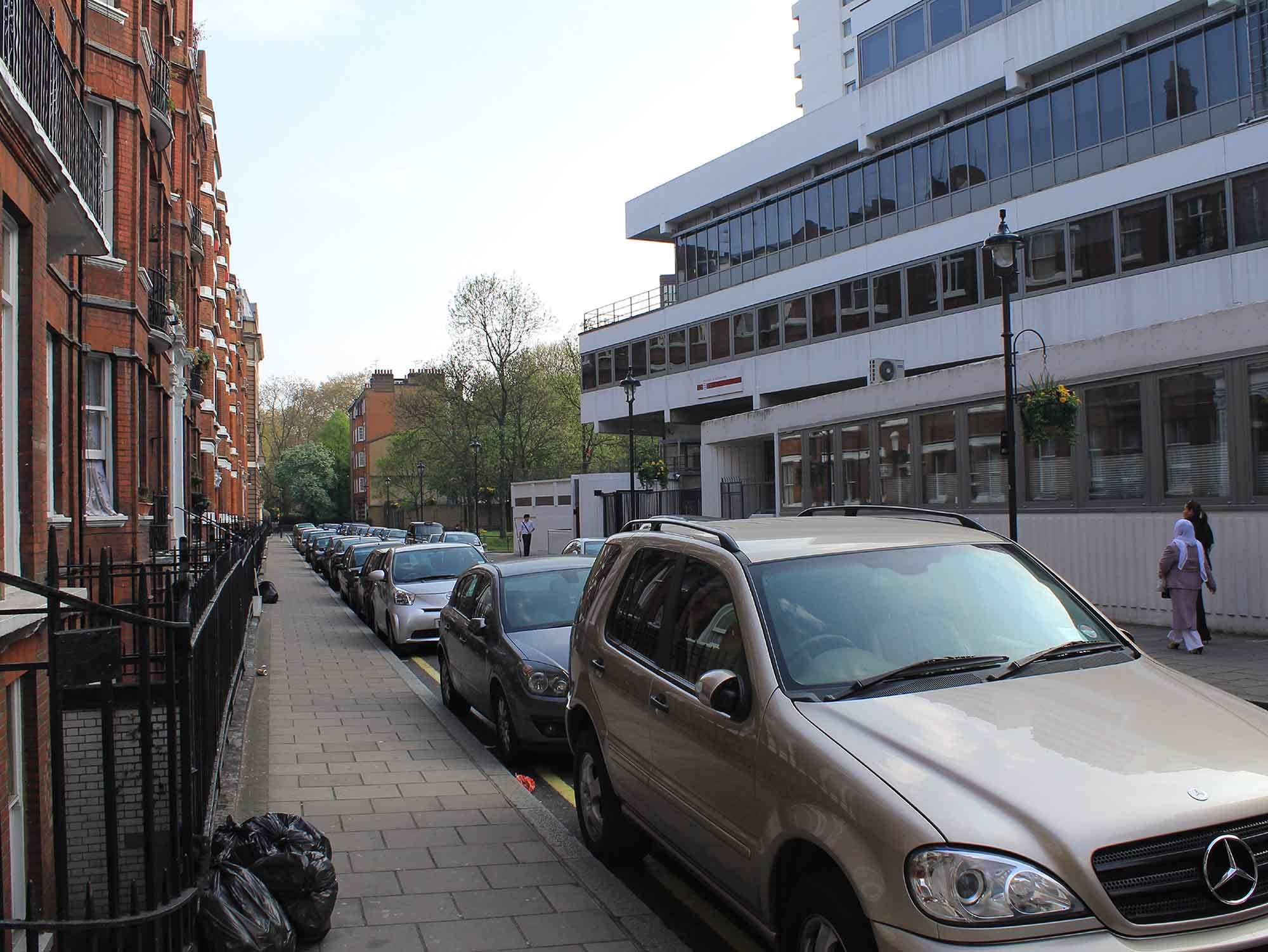
Luxborough Street looking south with mansion blocks on the left (east) and the University of Westminster on the right (west).

Luxborough Street, formerly Northumberland Street, is a street in the City of Westminster, London, that runs from Marylebone Road in the north to Paddington Street in the south. Nottingham Street joins Luxborough Street on its eastern side.

== Character ==
Luxborough Street is mostly composed of small mansion blocks apart from on the western side which is the University of Westminster.

== Inhabitants ==
Thomas de Quincey, later author of Confessions of an English Opium-Eater, lived at No. 5 in 1806–7.

In 1835, the novelist Anthony Trollope lived in lodgings at No. 22. He was just starting his career with the General Post Office and complained that he never had the money to pay his rent.

English novelist Rose Macauley, later author of The Towers of Trebizond, lived at No. 7-8 for most of the 1930s.

The archaeologist and antiquarian Edward Pyddoke lived at No. 11 until his death in 1976.

== St Marylebone Workhouse ==
The western side of Luxborough street was once the site of the St Marylebone Workhouse, later the St Marylebone Institution, and finally the Luxborough Lodge. It was closed in 1965 and demolished. The site became accommodation for the Polytechnic of Central London, later the University of Westminster.
