= Nottingham Street =

Street in the City of Westminster, London

Coordinates: 51°31′16.62″N 0°9′12.8″W

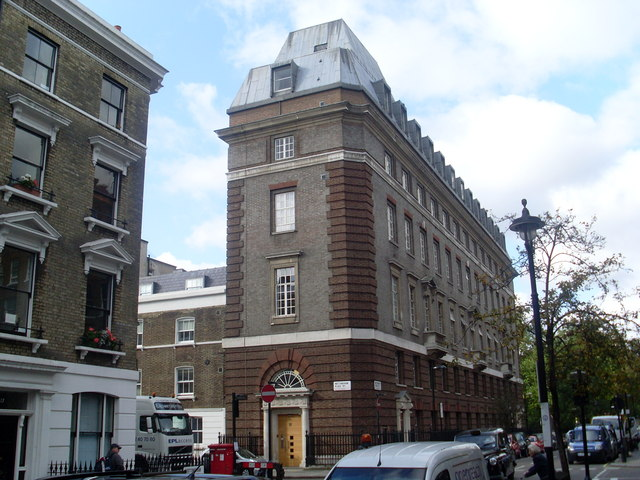
The Marylebone Telephone Exchange in Nottingham Street.

Nottingham Street is a street in the City of Westminster, London, that runs from Marylebone High Street in the east to Luxborough Street in the west. It is crossed by Nottingham Place. Bingham Place and Oldbury Place join it on the north side.

== Character ==
Nottingham Street is mostly composed of town houses and small mansion blocks. The most notable exception is the 1920s telephone exchange built in red and grey brick, of six storeys and completed with a mansard roof. The houses at numbers 2 to 5 Nottingham Street are grade II listed buildings with Historic England. The Prince Regent public house at No. 1 on the corner with Marylebone High Street is also grade II listed.
