= The Kashmir Klub =

Live music club in London, England

Coordinates: 51.5209°N 0.1529°W

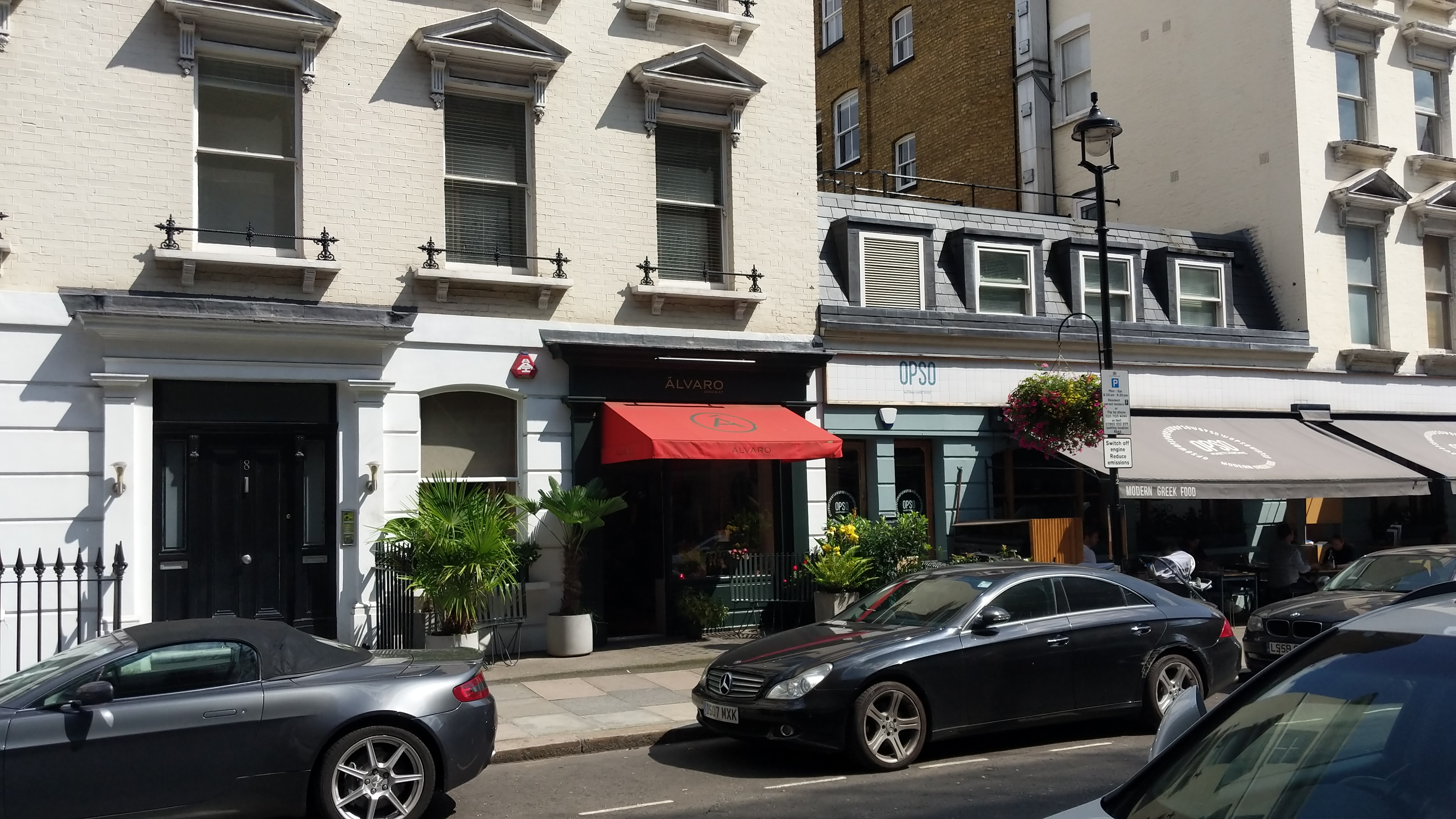
6 Nottingham Place, the location of the Kashmir Klub

The Kashmir Klub was a non-profit making, live music club that operated in central London, England between 1997 and 2003. It was located at 6 Nottingham Place, in the basement of a restaurant and bar called "Fabrizio" at the "Baker and Oven".

The club was started in November 1997 by musician and early Iron Maiden member Tony Moore to provide a different approach to discovering, developing and promoting the best signed and unsigned artists available, and to create a "fertile, creative and spontaneous" atmosphere. The name was inspired by the Led Zeppelin track "Kashmir". Moore loved the track and also the band. He said "It seemed to me that Led Zeppelin covered nearly every genre of music in their time, from rock to acoustic. So I thought "The Kashmir Klub" would be perfect."

== Concept ==
No one paid an entrance fee, no artists were paid for their performance or had to pay to play, and the organisers were not paid a wage for doing it, except for a sound engineer whose pay was funded by a 10% cut of bar takings. The equipment in the club was sponsored and donated by commercial companies. There was also a strict "No talking during the music" policy. Moore, who hosted the events, commenced each show with the statement "As you've noticed there's no cover charge. All you have to pay is attention."

== Operation ==
Originally open on Tuesday nights, the club expanded to run from Tuesday through Friday nights, as well as occasional Monday and Saturday evenings for special events. It was described by The Sunday Times in 2000 as "the coolest club in town."

The shows had a set format, with the artist performing two songs in the first set, followed by another two in a second set later in the evening. Sets would be acoustic and 'stripped back'.

On Tuesday, January 25, 2000 The Kashmir Klub, in conjunction with BMI, also began a monthly webcast showcase of BMI writers and artists live from London.

The club was known for championing artists early in their career, and various singers such as Paolo Nutini, KT Tunstall and Damien Rice. The club had famous artists ‘drop in’ and play unannounced including Sheryl Crow, Belinda Carlisle, Kiki Dee and Muse.

== Closure ==
The club finally closed on Saturday 17 May 2003, when the building was closed for redevelopment. Tony Moore continues to run a similar live music venue at The Bedford, a pub in Balham, south London. In 2004 other members of the Kashmir team opened 4 Sticks Live at The Cobden Members Club, a private club in west London.
