= Church Institute & Club =

Historic building in Westminster, England

Coordinates: 51.5206°N 0.1527°W

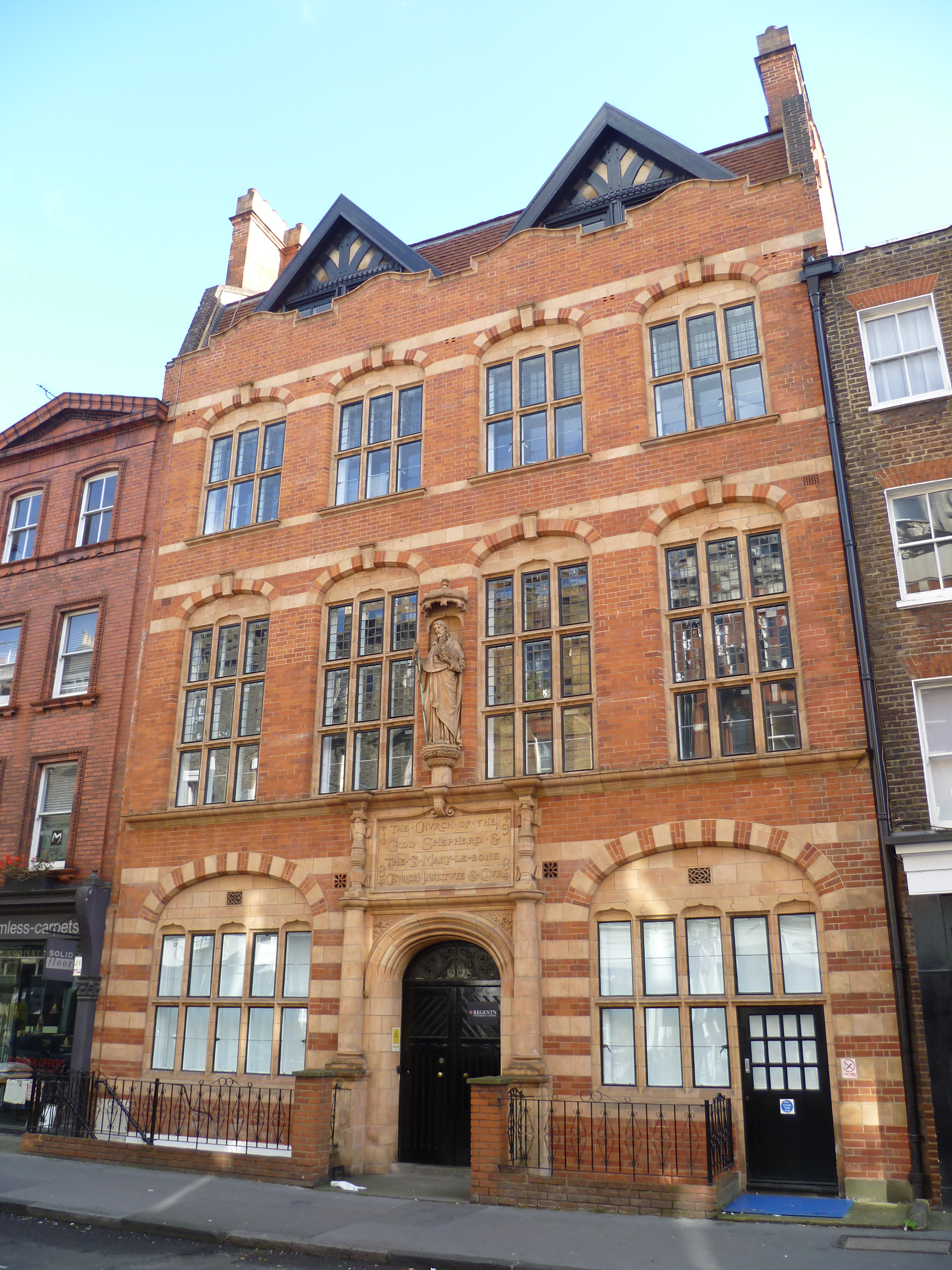
The Church Institute & Club

The Church of the Good Shepherd and The St Marylebone Church Institute & Club is a grade II listed building in Paddington Street in the City of Westminster.
