= Paddington Street Gardens =

Public gardens in London

Coordinates: 51.520360°N 0.154281°W

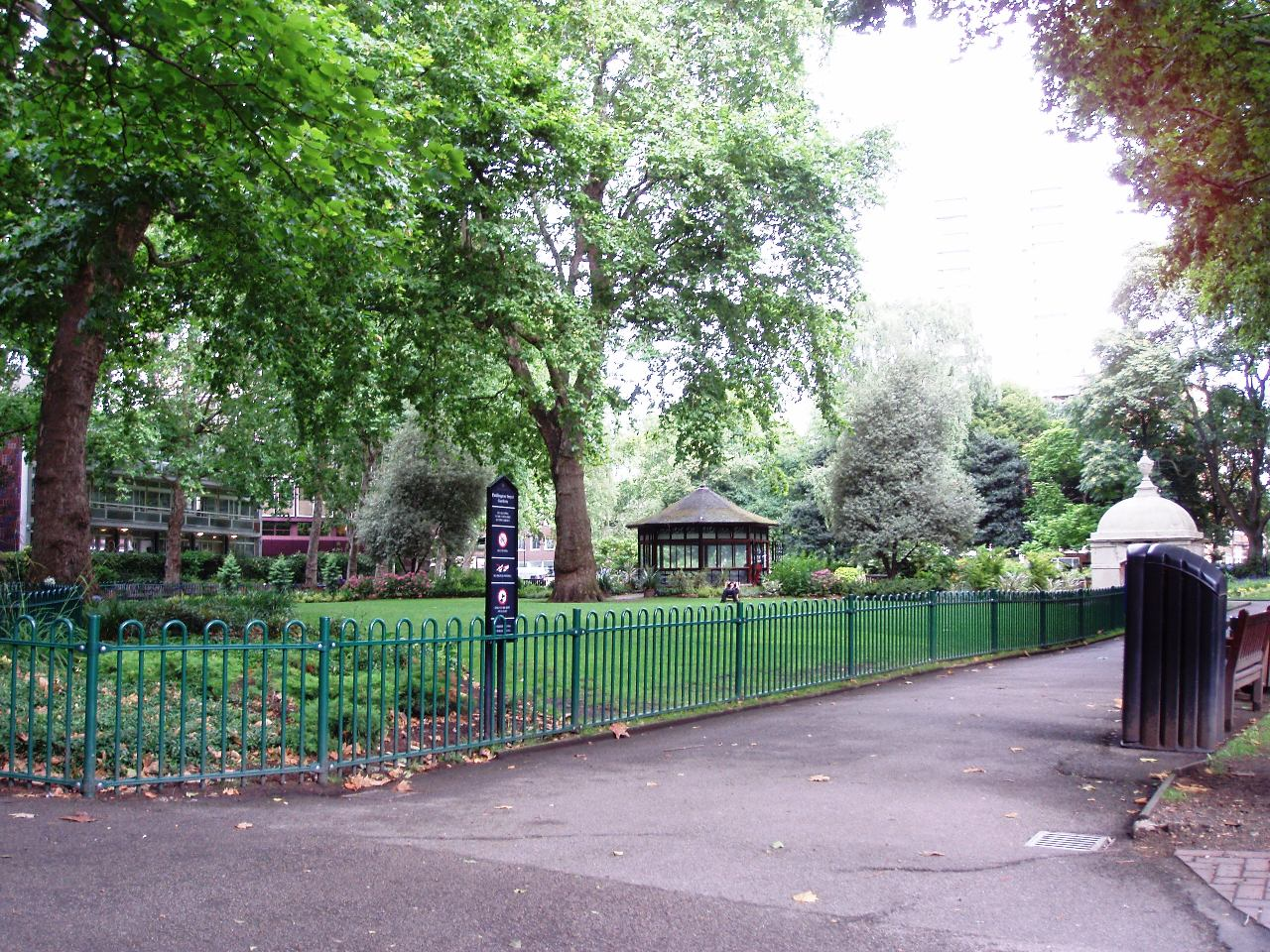
The gardens in 2008

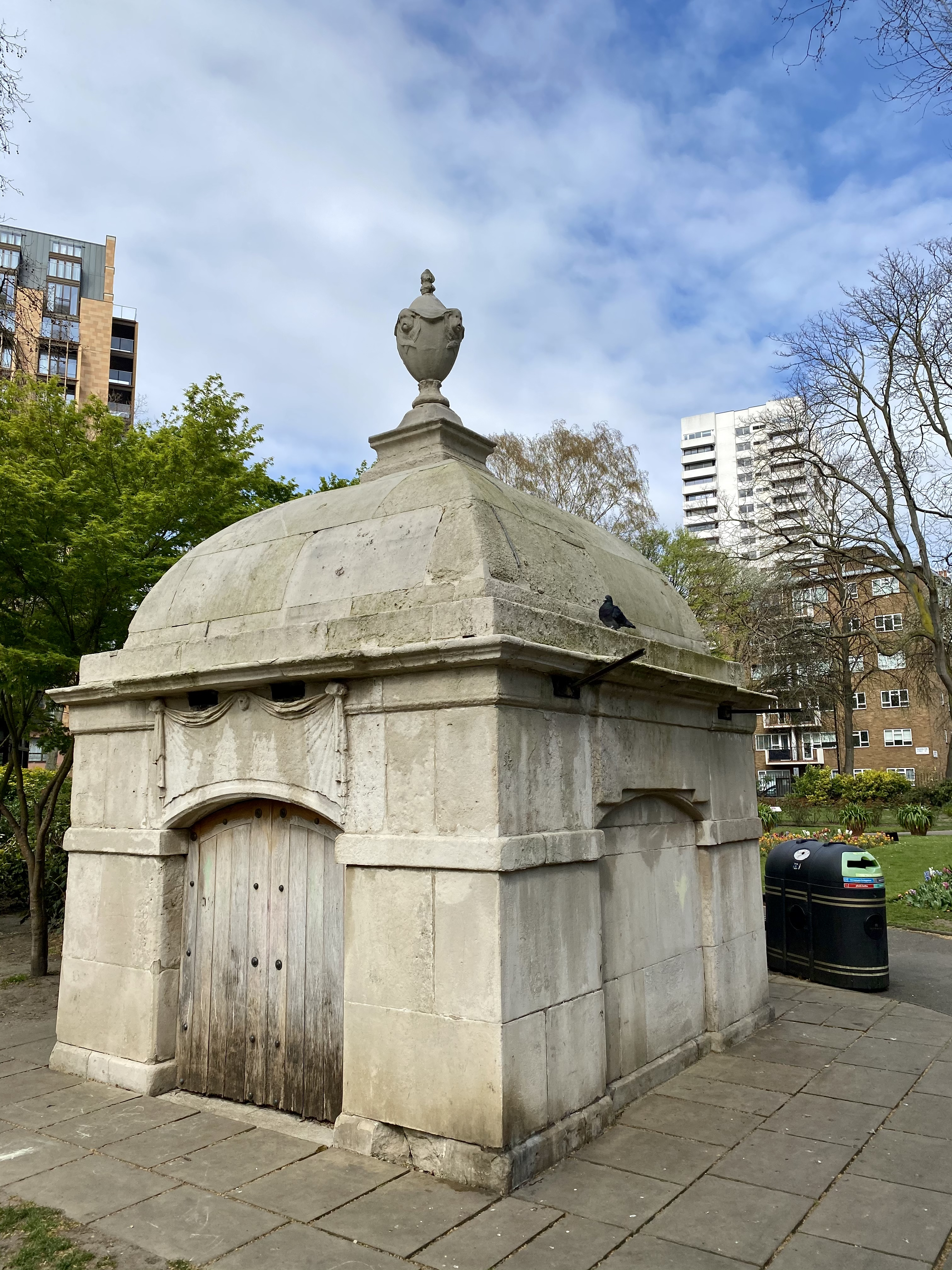
The Fitzpatrick family mausoleum

Paddington Street Gardens are two small public gardens located either side of Paddington Street in the Marylebone area of London.

The larger south garden contains a children's playground.

== History ==
The gardens were built in the 18th century as additional burial grounds for the St Marylebone Parish Church. The land on the south side was donated by Edward Harley, 2nd Earl of Oxford and Earl Mortimer in 1730. The land on the north side was later purchased in 1771.

The two burial grounds (either side of Paddington Street) were closed to burials in 1814. The Metropolitan Public Gardens Association arranged for the burial grounds to be opened as a public recreation ground in 1885, and the Association's landscape gardener Fanny Wilkinson (Britain's first female professional landscape gardener) laid out the gardens. The original lime and London plane trees survive. The gardens were officially opened on 6 July 1886 by Princess Louise, Duchess of Argyll.

The majority of the tombstones were removed, although some can still be seen around the edge of the gardens. The mausoleum in the south garden also remains. This was erected by the Hon Richard Fitzpatrick (the younger son of Richard FitzPatrick, 1st Baron Gowran) in 1759 in memory of his wife. It is Grade II listed.

It is estimated that between 80,000 and 110,000 graves lie beneath Paddington Street Gardens.
