= Paddington Street =

Street in the City of Westminster in London

Coordinates: 51°31′14.32″N 0°9′12.94″W

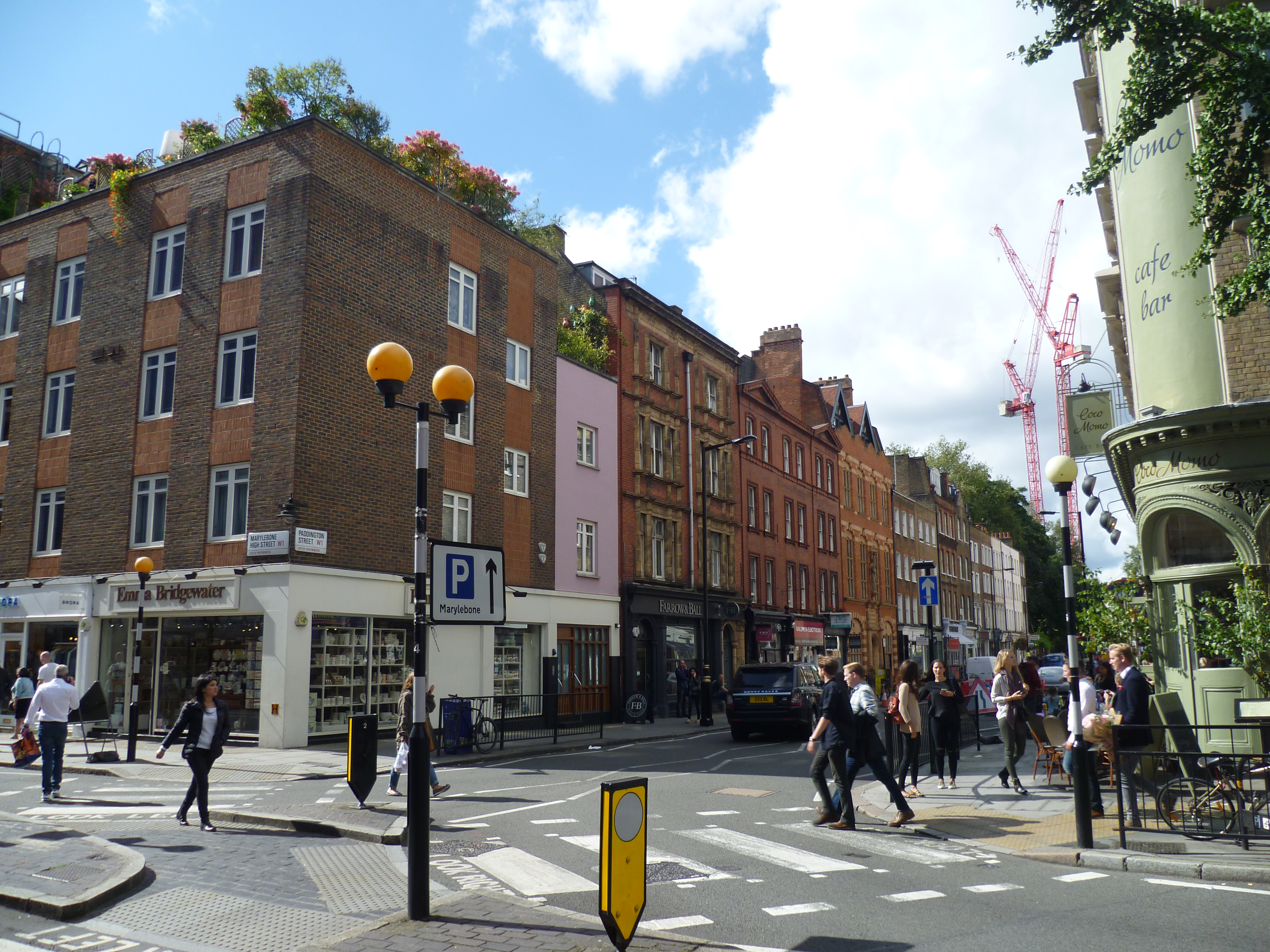
Paddington Street where it joins Marylebone High Street

Paddington Street is a street in the City of Westminster in London that runs from the junction of Crawford Street and Baker Street in the east to Marylebone High Street in the west.

Sherlock Mews, Chiltern Street, Luxborough Street, and Nottingham Place join Paddington Street on its north side. On the south side, Kenrick Place, Chiltern Street, and Ashland Place adjoin Paddington Street. The two open spaces of Paddington Street Gardens are situated on either side of the road.

The Hellenic Centre is located at 16–18 Paddington Street.

== See also ==
- Church Institute & Club
