= Jacqui Poncelet =

Belgian artist (born 1947)

Jacqui Poncelet (born 1947), also known as Jacqueline Poncelet, is a Belgian artist. Poncelet began her art career as a ceramist in the 1970s and 1980s. In the 1980s, her practice expanded to include painting, sculpture and public art.

== Early life and education ==
Jacqui Poncelet was born in Liège, Belgium, in 1947. From 1964 to 1969, she studied ceramics at Wolverhampton College of Art. From 1969 to 1972, she studied industrial ceramics at the Royal College of Art.

== Art career ==
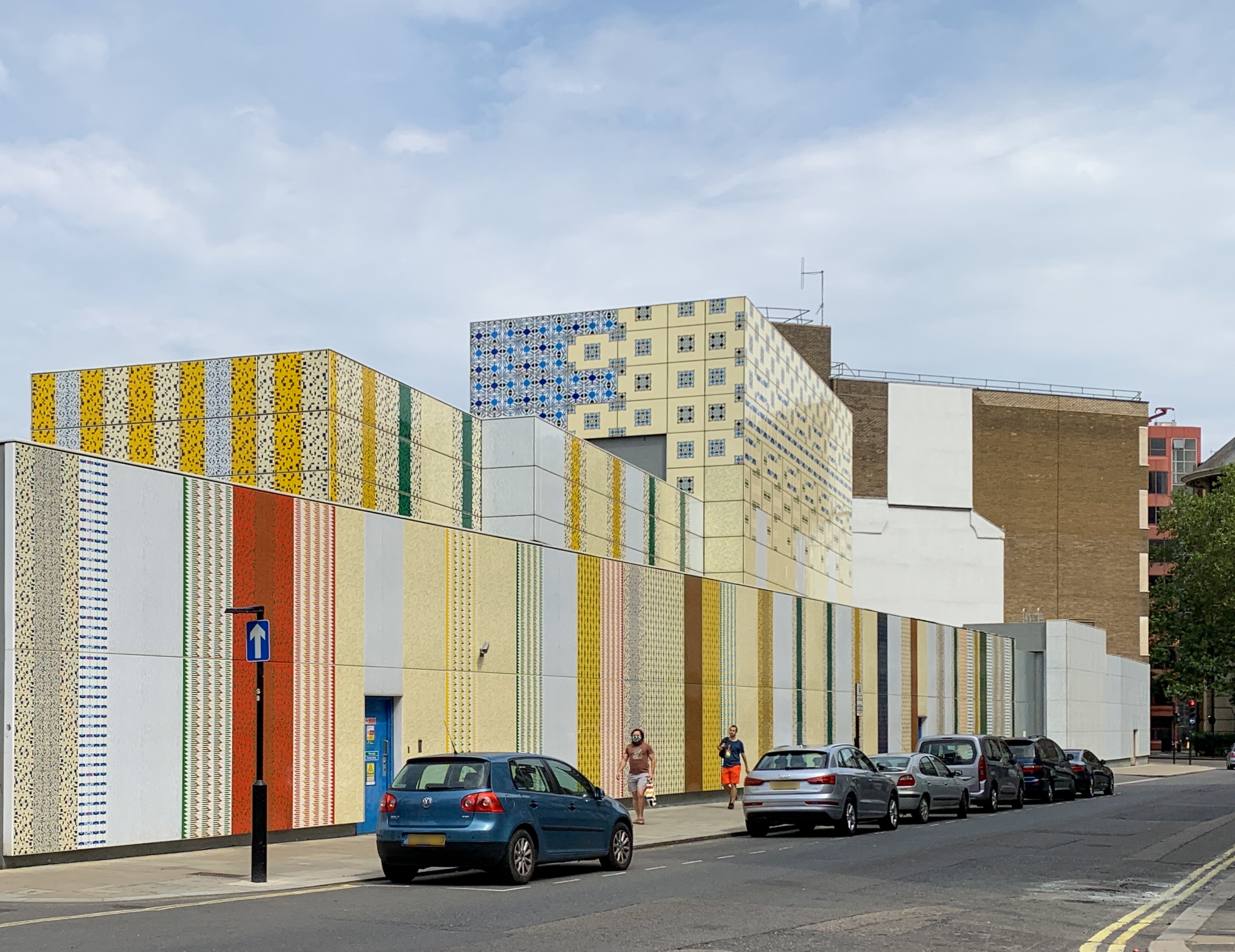
Wide view of Wrapper

Poncelet has worked in various media, included ceramics, collage, painting, sculpture, textiles and wallpaper. Early in her career she designed a series of carpets using remnants discarded by carpet shops, with Poncelet describing this work as "a representation of Britain".

Her 2012 public artwork Wrapper can be seen at the Edgware Road (Circle line) Tube station in London. Art on the Underground commissioned Poncelet to produce designs for the 1,500 square metres (16,000 sq ft) of vitreous enamel cladding that would become the outer shell of a new substation connected to the station. The work was unveiled in November 2012, a mosaic of 700 decorated panels of various patterns inspired by local history. Poncelet's other large-scale public works include a terrazzo dado for an Edinburgh International Festival building, and decorative vinyl for windows in the heart centre at the John Radcliffe Hospital in Headington, Oxford.

In 2016, Poncelet won the Freelands Award, a prize that enables a British arts organisation to present an exhibition by a female artist who "may not yet have received the acclaim or public recognition that her work deserves". Her work was consequently displayed in a major retrospective by the Middlesbrough Institute of Modern Art in early 2024.

== Collections ==
Her work is included in the collections of the Victoria and Albert Museum, the United Kingdom Crafts Council, the Tate Museum, the Art Institute of Chicago, the Museum of Modern Art, New York, the Stedelijk Museum Amsterdam, and the British Council.

== Personal life ==
Poncelet was previously married to the sculptor Richard Deacon. As of 2024, she divides her time between homes in London and South Wales, with her partner Anthony Stokes.
