= Pilane (Sweden) =

Iron Age settlement site in Klövdal, Bohuslän, Sweden

Coordinates: 58.030°N 11.554°E

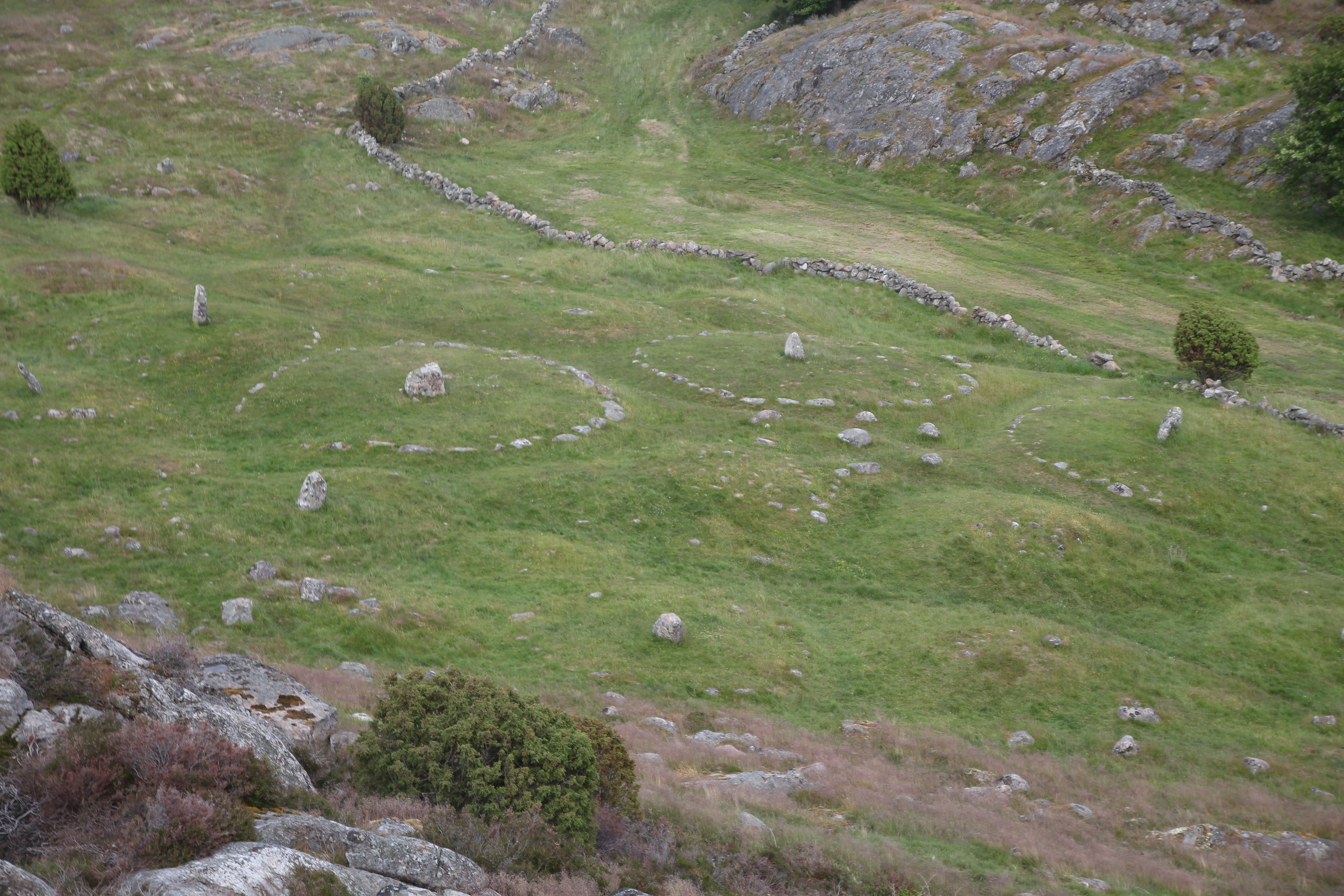
Some of the Pilane grave markers viewed from the neighbouring hill.

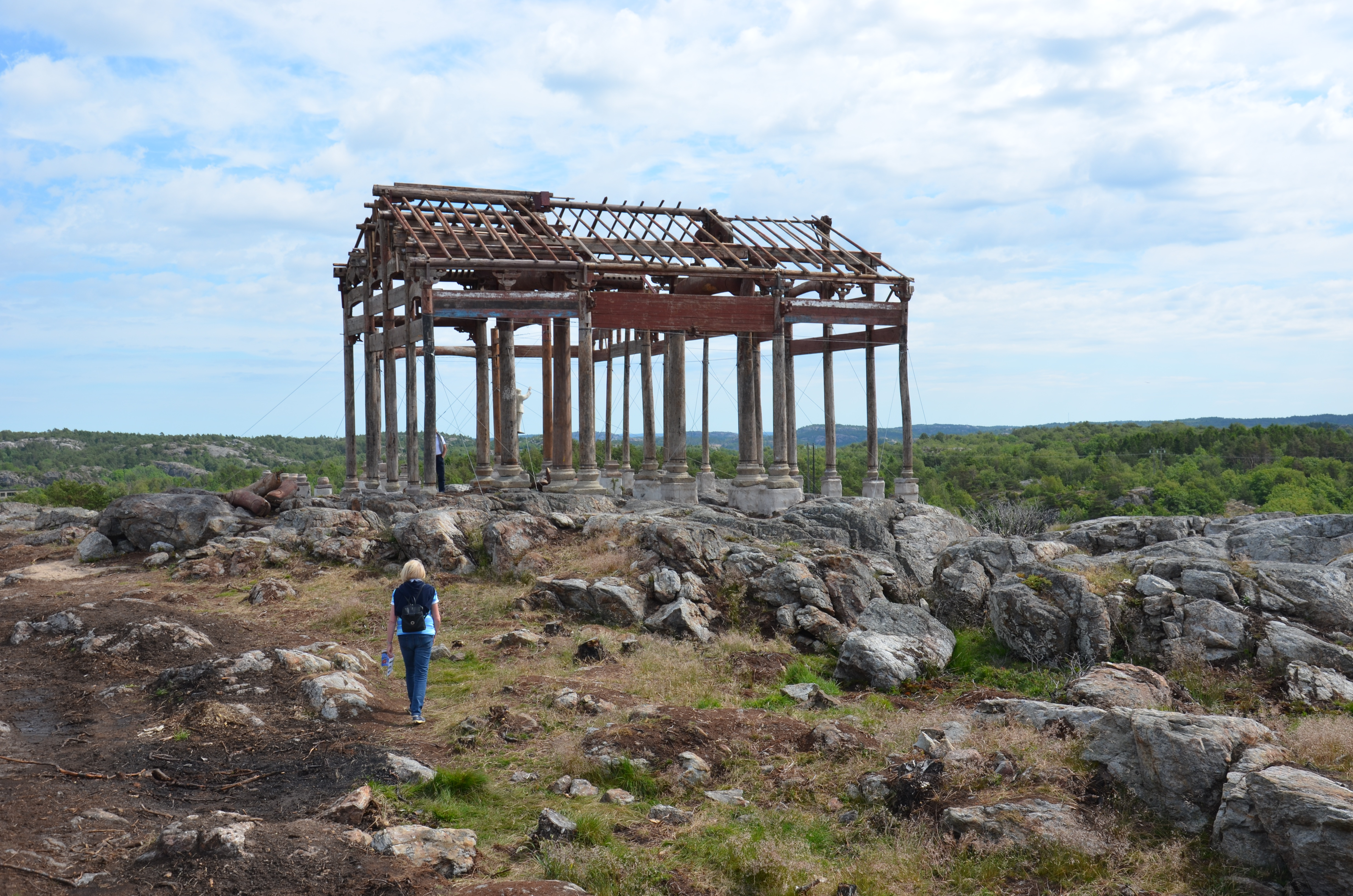
Zhang Huan's "Spread the sunshine over the earth", installed at Pilane, 2012

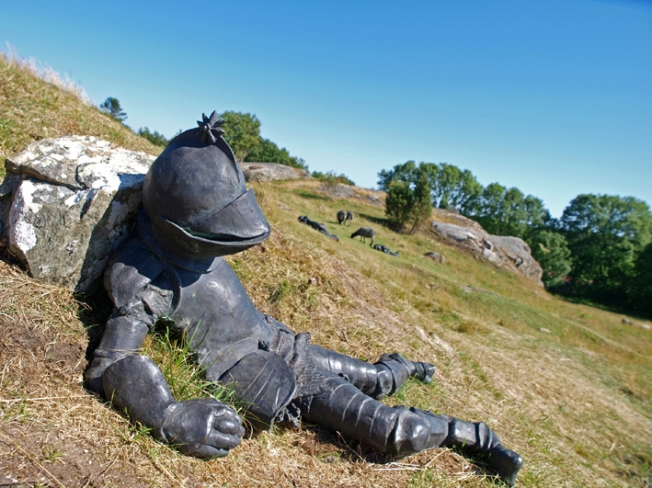
"Armour Boys", by Laura Ford, installed at Pilane, 2006

Pilane in Klövdal, Tjörn, Bohuslän, Sweden, is an Iron Age settlement site and grave field, dated to 1-600 AD. The grave field consists of approximately 90 ancient monuments, including stone circles, burial mounds, circular stone grave markers and standing stones. The site is under the care of the Swedish National Heritage Board and the land is leased as sheep pasture.

In the summer of 2007, the Pilane site started to be used for a seasonal outdoor sculpture exhibition: Skulptur i Pilane (Sculpture in Pilane). During its first year the exhibition had 60,000 visitors. The art activities are coordinated by the private, non-profit Pilane Heritage Museum, which is financed by the entry fees.

The site occupies a prominent position, with extensive views over land and sea. The Basteröd rock carvings site is nearby.
