= List of churches in the Archdiocese of St. Louis =

This is a list of current and former churches in the Archdiocese of St. Louis. All church buildings of parishes closed on August 1, 2023 under the All Things New rationalization plan will remain open for prayer.

== Franklin County ==
Name	Image	Location	Description/sources
Assumption (New Haven)		603 Miller St., New Haven, MO 63068-1116	
Holy Family		124 Holy Family Church Rd., New Haven, MO 63068-2664	
Holy Martyrs of Japan, Church of the		8244 Highway AE, Sullivan, MO 63080-3229	
Immaculate Conception (Union)		100 N. Washington Ave., Union, MO 63084-1692	
Our Lady of Lourdes (Washington)		1014 Madison Ave., Washington, MO 63090-4898	
St. Ann (Clover Bottom)		7851 Highway YY, Washington, MO 63090-4050	
St. Anthony (Sullivan)		201 W. Springfield Rd., Sullivan, MO 63080-1550	
St. Bridget of Kildare		111 W. Union St., Pacific, MO 63069-1414	
St. Clare (St. Clair)		165 E. Springfield Rd., St. Clair, MO 63077-1727	
St. Francis Borgia		115 Cedar St., Washington, MO 63090-2193	
St. Francis of Assisi (Luebbering)		1000 Luebbering Rd., Luebbering, MO 63061-3100	To be amalgamated into St. Clare on August 1, 2023.
St. Gerald		124 E. Fitzgerald Ave., Gerald, MO 63037 Postal: c/o 124 Holy Family Church Rd., New Haven, MO 63068	
St. Gertrude		6535 Highway YY, Washington, MO 63090-4074	
St. James (Catawissa)		1107 Summit Dr., Catawissa, MO 63015-1404	
St. John the Baptist (Gildehaus)		5567 Gildehaus Rd., Villa Ridge, MO 63089-1228	
St. Joseph (Neier)		2401 Neier Rd., Union, MO 63084-3411	
St. Mary of Perpetual Help		1587 Highway AM, Villa Ridge, MO 63089-2732	
St. Patrick (Armagh)		150 Rock Church Rd., Catawissa, MO 63015 Postal: c/o 1107 Summit Dr., Catawissa, MO 63015-1404	
St. Paul (Berger)		300 Walnut St., Berger, MO 63014 Postal: c/o 603 Miller St., New Haven, MO 63068-1116	To be amalgamated into Assumption (New Haven) on August 1, 2023.

== Jefferson County ==
Name	Image	Location	Description/sources
Good Shepherd, Church of the		703 Third St., Hillsboro, MO 63050-4342	
Immaculate Conception (Arnold)		2300 Church Rd., Arnold, MO 63010-2110	To be merged into the provisionally-named Immaculate Conception and St. David Parish on August 1, 2023. The church building housing the merged parish is to be determined.
Our Lady		1550 St. Marys Ln., Festus, MO 63028-1543	
Our Lady, Queen of Peace		4696 Notre Dame Ln., House Springs, MO 63051-2045	
Sacred Heart (Crystal City)		555 Bailey Rd., Crystal City, MO 63019-1798	
St. Anthony of Padua (High Ridge)		3009 High Ridge Blvd., High Ridge, MO 63049-2216	
St. David		2334 Tenbrook Rd., Arnold, MO 63010-2366	To be merged into the provisionally-named Immaculate Conception and St. David Parish on August 1, 2023. The church building housing the merged parish is to be determined.
St. John the Beloved Disciple (Imperial)		4614 Blue Springs Dr., Imperial, MO 63052-1237	
St. Joseph (Imperial)		6020 Old Antonia Rd., Imperial, MO 63052-2394	
St. Rose of Lima (DeSoto)		504 S. Third St., DeSoto, MO 63020-2097	

== Lincoln County ==
Name	Image	Location	Description/sources
Immaculate Conception (Old Monroe)		110 Maryknoll Rd., Old Monroe, MO 63369-2329	
Sacred Heart (Elsberry)		714 Lincoln St., Elsberry, MO 63343-1125	
Sacred Heart (Troy)		100 Thompson Dr., Troy, MO 63379-2321	
St. Alphonsus (Millwood)		29 St. Alphonsus Rd., Silex, MO 63377-3217	
St. Mary (Hawk Point)		P.O. Box 205, Hawk Point, MO 63349-0205	

== Miller County ==
Name	Image	Location	Description/sources
St. Stephen		11514 Highway A, P.O. Box 233, Richwoods, MO 63071-0233	To be amalgamated into St. Joachim on August 1, 2023.

== Perry County ==
Name	Image	Location	Description/sources
Christ the Savior		57 Shady Ln., Perryville, MO 63775-7386	
Nativity of the Blessed Virgin Mary		Belgique	Former parish
Our Lady of Victory		172 PCR 920, Perryville, MO 63775-8368	
St. Boniface		Perryville	Former parish, closed in 1964
St. James (Crosstown)		21694 Highway C, Perryville, MO 63775 Postal: c/o 1010 Rosati Ct., Perryville, MO 63775-2319	
St. John the Evangelist Church, Lithium		Blue Spring Lane, Lithium	Former parish, closed in 1985
St. Joseph (Apple Creek)		138 St. Joseph Ln., Perryville, MO 63775-6242	
St. Joseph (Highland)		2640 Highway K, Perryville, MO 63775 Postal: c/o 1010 Rosati Ct., Perryville, MO 63775-2319	
St. Mary's of the Barrens		1811 W St Joseph St, Perryville	
St. Maurus		10198 Highway B, Perryville, MO 63775-5736	
St. Rose of Lima (Silver Lake)		10138 Highway T, Perryville, MO 63775 Postal: c/o 1010 Rosati Ct., Perryville, MO 63775-2319	
St. Vincent de Paul (Perryville)		1010 Rosati Ct, Perryville, MO 63775-2319	

== St. Charles County ==
Name	Image	Location	Description/sources
All Saints (St. Peter's)		7 McMenamy Rd., St. Peters, MO 63376-1590	
Assumption (O'Fallon)		403 N. Main St., O'Fallon, MO 63366-2205	
Immaculate Conception (Augusta)		5912 S. Highway 94, Augusta, MO 63332-1604	
Immaculate Conception (Dardenne Prairie)		7701 Town Square Ave., Dardenne Prairie, MO 63368-6702	
Immaculate Heart of Mary (New Melle)		8 W. Highway D, P.O. Box 100, New Melle, MO 63365-0100	
St. Barnabas		1400 N. Main St., O'Fallon, MO 63366-4321	To be amalgamated into Assumption (O'Fallon) on August 1, 2023. Land and buildings to be leased by Assumption (O'Fallon) to the new St. Juan Diego Parish.
St. Charles Borromeo		601 N. 4th St., St. Charles, MO 63301-2093	
St. Cletus (St. Charles)		2705 Zumbehl Rd.. St. Charles, MO 63301-1135	
St. Elizabeth Ann Seton		2 Seton Ct., St. Charles, MO 63303-3362	
St. Francis of Assisi (Portage des Sioux)		1355 Farnham St., Portage Des Sioux, MO 63373-0129	To be amalgamated into St. Charles Borromeo on August 1, 2023.
St. Gianna		450 E. Highway N, Wentzville, MO 63385-5905	
Sts. Joachim and Ann		4112 McClay Rd., St. Charles, MO 63304-7918	
St. Juan Diego		1400 N. Main St., O'Fallon, MO 63366-4321	A personal parish for all those of Hispanic language and heritage, particularly those in St. Charles, Lincoln, and Warren Counties. To be erected on August 1, 2023.
St. Joseph (Cottleville)		1355 Motherhead Rd., St. Charles, MO 63304-7686	
St. Joseph (Josephville)		1390 Josephville Rd., Wentzville, MO 63385-3008	
St. Patrick (Wentzville)		405 S. Church St., Wentzville, MO 63385-1606	
St. Paul (St. Paul)		1223 Church Rd., St. Paul, MO 63366-5105	
St. Peter (St. Charles)		221 First Capitol Dr., St. Charles, MO 63301-3413	
St. Robert Bellarmine		1424 S. First Capitol Dr., St. Charles, MO 63303-3799	To be amalgamated into St. Elizabeth Ann Seton on August 1, 2023.
St. Theodore		5085 Hwy P, Wentzville, MO 63385	

== St. Francois County ==
Name	Image	Location	Description/sources
Immaculate Conception (Park Hills)		1020 W. Main St., Park Hills, MO 63601-0066	
St. Anne (French Village)		5391 Hwy Y, French Village, MO 63036 Postal: c/o 15 St. Joseph St., Bonne Terre, MO 63628-1294	
St. John the Apostle Mission		900 Maple St., Bismark, Missouri 63624 Postal: c/o 1020 W. Main St., Park Hills, MO 63601	To be amalgamated into Immaculate Conception (Park Hills) on August 1, 2023.
St. Joseph (Bonne Terre)		15 St. Joseph St., Bonne Terre, MO 63628-1294	
St. Joseph (Farmington)		10 N. Long St., Farmington, MO 63640-3132	

== Ste. Genevieve County ==
Name	Image	Location	Description/sources
Our Lady Help of Christians		13370 Highway 32, Ste. Genevieve, MO 63670-8304	
Sacred Heart (Ozora)		17742 State Rte. N, St. Mary, MO 63673-9035	
St. Agnes		40 St. Agnes Dr., P.O. Box 124, Bloomsdale, MO 63627-0124	
St. Catherine of Alexandria (Coffman)		23496 State Route WW, Ste. Genevieve, MO 63670-3132	To be amalgamated into St. Joseph (Farmington) on August 1, 2023.
Ste. Genevieve		20 N. Fourth St., Ste. Genevieve, MO 63670-1697	Oldest parish in the archdiocese
St. Joseph (Zell)		11824 Zell Rd., Ste. Genevieve, MO 63670-8025	
St. Lawrence		8055 State Route Y, Bloomsdale, MO 63627 Postal: c/o 40 St. Agnes Dr., P.O. Box 124, Bloomsdale, MO 63627-0124	To be amalgamated into St. Agnes on August 1, 2023.
Sts. Philip and James		18411 RAV Church Rd., Ste. Genevieve, MO 63670-9147	To be amalgamated into Ste. Genevieve on August 1, 2023.

== St. Louis City ==
Name	Image	Location	Description/sources
Basilica of St. Louis, King of France		209 Walnut St, St. Louis, MO 63102-2499	Founded 1770
Cathedral Basilica of Saint Louis		4431 Lindell Blvd, St. Louis, MO 63108-2496	
Ephiphany of Our Lord		6596 Smiley Ave, St. Louis, MO 63139-2487	Founded 1911
Immaculate Conception		3120 Lafayette Ave, St. Louis	Former parish
Immaculate Heart of Mary (St. Louis)		4092 Blow St., St. Louis, MO 63116-2796	To be amalgamated into St. Stephen Promartyr on August 1, 2023.
Most Holy Trinity		3519 N. 14th St., St. Louis, MO 63107-3796	To be merged into the provisionally-named Most Holy Trinity, St. Nicholas, and Sts. Teresa and Bridget Parish on August 1, 2023. The church building housing the merged parish is to be determined.
Our Lady of Sorrows		5020 Rhodes Ave., St. Louis, MO 63109-3589	To be merged into the provisionally-named Our Lady of Sorrows, St. Mary Magdalen, and St. Joan of Arc Parish on August 1, 2023. The church building housing the merged parish is to be determined.
Our Lady of the Holy Cross		8115 Church Rd., St. Louis, MO 63147-1832	To be merged into the provisionally-named Our Lady of the Holy Cross, St. Augustine, St. Elizabeth, Mother of John the Baptist, and St. Matthew the Apostle Parish on August 1, 2023. The church building housing the merged parish is to be determined.
Resurrection of Our Lord		3900 Meramec St., St. Louis, MO 63116-4499	
St. Agatha (St. Louis)		3239 S. 9th St., St. Louis, MO 63118-2697	
St. Alphonsus Liguori (Rock) (St. Louis)		1118 N. Grand Ave, St. Louis, MO 63106-1696	
St. Ambrose		5130 Wilson Ave., St. Louis, MO 63110-3110	Founded 1903
St. Anthony of Padua (St. Louis)		3140 Meramec St., St. Louis, MO 63118-4399	Founded 1863
St. Augustine		1371 Hamilton Ave., St. Louis, MO 63112-3751	To be merged into the provisionally-named Our Lady of the Holy Cross, St. Augustine, St. Elizabeth, Mother of John the Baptist, and St. Matthew the Apostle Parish on August 1, 2023. The church building housing the merged parish is to be determined.
St. Cecilia		5418 Louisiana Ave, St. Louis, MO 63111-1897	
St. Cronan		1202 S. Boyle Ave., St. Louis, MO 63110-3894	Personal parish on the territory of St. Margaret of Scotland. To be suppressed on August 1, 2023. Future baptisms and weddings celebrated here are to be recorded at St. Margaret of Scotland. Property, patrimonial rights, and obligations to remain separate, managed by St. Cronan's senior priest in residence.
St. Elizabeth, Mother of John the Baptist		4330 Shreve Ave., St. Louis, MO 63115-2199	To be merged into the provisionally-named Our Lady of the Holy Cross, St. Augustine, St. Elizabeth, Mother of John the Baptist, and St. Matthew the Apostle Parish on August 1, 2023. The church building housing the merged parish is to be determined.
St. Francis de Sales Oratory		2653 Ohio Ave, St. Louis, MO 63118-1594	
St. Francis Xavier (College Church)		3628 Lindell Blvd, St. Louis, MO 63108-3394	
St. Gabriel the Archangel		6303 Nottingham Ave., St. Louis, MO 63109-3177	
St. James the Greater		6401 Wade Ave., St. Louis, MO 63139-3497	
St. Joan of Arc		5800 Oleatha Ave, St. Louis, MO 63139-1979	Founded 1940. To be merged into the provisionally-named Our Lady of Sorrows, St. Mary Magdalen, and St. Joan of Arc Parish on August 1, 2023. The church building housing the merged parish is to be determined.
St. John the Baptist (St. Louis)		4200 Delor St., St. Louis, MO 63116-2388	To be amalgamated into St. Stephen Promartyr on August 1, 2023.
St. John, Apostle and Evangelist		15 Plaza Square, St. Louis, MO 63103-2395	Founded 1847. To be amalgamated into Basilica of St. Louis, King of France, on August 1, 2023.
St. John Nepomuk Chapel		1625 S. 11th St., St. Louis, MO 63104-3705	
St. Joseph, Shrine of (St. Louis)		1220 N 11th St, St. Louis, MO 63106-4614	
St. Joseph-Croatian (St. Louis)		2112 S. 12th St., St. Louis, MO 63104-4129	
St. Liborius		1835 N 18th St, St. Louis	Former parish, closed in 1992
St. Louis Byzantine (Ruthenian) Church, Byzantine Eparchy of Parma		320 E. Ripa Ave., St. Louis, MO 63123	
St. Margaret of Scotland		3854 Flad Ave, St. Louis, MO 63110-4024	Founded 1899
Sts. Mary and Joseph Chapel		6304 Minnesota Ave, St. Louis, MO 63111 Postal: c/o 3949 Wilmington Ave., St. Louis, MO 63116-3291	
St. Mary Magdalen (Church of the Magdalen) (St. Louis)		4924 Bancroft Ave., St. Louis, MO 63109-2499	To be merged into the provisionally-named Our Lady of Sorrows, St. Mary Magdalen, and St. Joan of Arc Parish on August 1, 2023. The church building housing the merged parish is to be determined.
St. Mary of Victories Chapel		744 S 3rd St, St. Louis, MO 63102-1645	Founded 1843
St. Matthew the Apostle		2715 N. Sarah St., St. Louis, MO 63113-2940	To be merged into the provisionally-named Our Lady of the Holy Cross, St. Augustine, St. Elizabeth, Mother of John the Baptist, and St. Matthew the Apostle Parish on August 1, 2023. The church building housing the merged parish is to be determined.
St. Nicholas		701 N 18th St, St. Louis, MO 63103-1727	To be merged into the provisionally-named Most Holy Trinity, St. Nicholas, and Sts. Teresa and Bridget Parish on August 1, 2023. The church building housing the merged parish is to be determined.
Sts. Peter and Paul		1919 S. 7th St., St. Louis, MO 63104-4029	Personal parish on the territory of St. Vincent de Paul (St .Louis). To be suppressed on August 1, 2023. Future baptisms and weddings celebrated here to be recorded at St. Vincent de Paul (St. Louis). Property, patrimonial rights, and obligations to remain separate, managed by Sts. Peter and Paul's senior priest in residence.
St. Pius V		3310 S Grand Blvd, St. Louis, MO 63118-1089	Founded 1905
St. Raphael the Archangel		6047 Bishops Pl., St. Louis, MO 63109-3398	
St. Raymond's Cathedral		931 Lebanon Drive, St. Louis, MO 63104	
St. Roch		6052 Waterman Blvd., St. Louis, MO 63112-1399	To be amalgamated into Christ the King on August 1, 2023.
St. Stanislaus Kostka		1413 N 20th St, St. Louis	Former parish
St. Stephen Protomartyr		3949 Wilmington Ave., St. Louis, MO 63116-3291	
Sts. Teresa and Bridget		3636 N. Market St., St. Louis, MO 63113-3606	To be merged into the provisionally-named Most Holy Trinity, St. Nicholas, and Sts. Teresa and Bridget Parish on August 1, 2023. The church building housing the merged parish is to be determined.
St. Vincent de Paul (St. Louis)		1408 S. 10th St., St. Louis, MO 63104-3725	
St. Wenceslaus		3014 Oregon Ave., St. Louis, MO 63118-1412	

== St. Louis County ==
Name	Image	Location	Description/sources
All Saints (University City)		6403 Clemens Ave., University City, MO 63130-3497	Founded 1901. To be amalgamated into Christ the King on August 1, 2023.
All Souls		9550 Tennyson Ave, Overland, MO 63114-3399	Founded 1912
Annunciation		12 W. Glendale Rd., Webster Groves, MO 63119-4097	
Annunziata, Church of the		9305 Clayton Rd, Ladue, MO 63124-1692	Founded 1929
Ascension		230 Santa Maria Dr., Chesterfield, MO 63005-1600	
Assumption (Mattesse)		4725 Mattis Rd, St. Louis, MO 63128-2821 (unincorporated St. Louis County)	Founded 1839 - Fathers Saulnier and Fischer
Blessed Teresa of Calcutta		120 N. Elizabeth Ave., St. Louis, MO 63135-1346	To be amalgamated into Sacred Heart (Florissant) on August 1, 2023.
Christ the King		7316 Balson Ave, University City, MO 63130-2999	Founded 1927
Christ, Prince of Peace		415 Weidman Rd., Manchester, MO 63011-4431	
Curé of Ars		670 S. Laclede Station Rd., Shrewsbury, MO 63119-4910	Founded 1966. To be amalgamated into St. Michael the Archangel on August 1, 2023.
Holy Infant		627 Dennison Dr., Ballwin, MO 63021-4898	
Holy Name of Jesus		10235 Ashbrook Dr., Bellefontaine Neighbors, MO 63137-1598	To be merged into the provisionally-named Holy Name of Jesus, St. Angela Merici, and St. Norbert Parish on August 1, 2023. The church building housing the merged parish is to be determined.
Holy Redeemer		17 Joy Ave., Webster Groves, MO 63119-2599	
Holy Spirit		3130 Parkwood Ln., Maryland Heights, MO 63043-1396	
Immacolata		8900 Clayton Rd., Richmond, Heights, MO 63117-1093	
Immaculate Conception (Maplewood)		2934 Marshall Ave., Maplewood, MO 63143-3299	To be amalgamated into St. Mary Magdalen (Brentwood) on August 1, 2023.
Incarnate Word		13416 Olive Blvd., Chesterfield, MO 63017-3196	
Little Flower		1264 Arch Terrace, Richmond Heights, MO 63117-1491	
Mary, Mother of the Church		5901 Kerth Rd., St. Louis, MO 63128-3705 (unincorporated St. Louis County)	
Mary, Queen of Peace		676 W. Lockwood Ave., Webster Groves, 63119-3597	
Most Sacred Heart		350 E. Fourth St., Eureka, MO 63025-1949	
Old St. Ferdinand Shrine		1 Rue St. Francois, Florissant, MO 63031-6815	
Oratory of Sts. Gregory and Augustine		7230 Dale Avenue, Richmond Heights, MO 63117-2398	
Our Lady of Guadalupe		1115 S. Florissant Rd., Ferguson, MO 63121-1198	
Our Lady of Lourdes (University City)		7148 Forsyth Blvd, University City, MO 63105-2199	Founded 1916
Our Lady of Providence		8866 Pardee Rd., Crestwood, MO 63123-1096	
Our Lady of the Pillar		401 S. Lindbergh Blvd., Creve Coeur, MO 63131-2729	
Our Lady of the Presentation		8860 Tudor Ave., Overland, MO 63114-4998	To be amalgamated into St. Ann (Normandy) on August 1, 2023
Queen of All Saints		6603 Christopher Dr., Oakville, MO 63129-4919	
Sacred Heart (Florissant)		751 N. Jefferson St., Florissant, MO 63031-5085	
Sacred Heart (Valley Park)		17 Ann Ave., Valley Park, MO 63088-1696	
St. Alban Roe		2001 Shepard Rd., Wildwood, MO 63038-1360	
St. Andrew		309 Hoffmeister Ave., St. Louis, MO 63125-1609 (unincorporated St. Louis County)	To be amalgamated into St. Mark on August 1, 2023.
St. Andrew Kim		13996 Olive Blvd., Chesterfield, MO 63017	
St. Angela Merici		3860 N. Highway 67, Florissant, MO 63034-2427	To be merged into the provisionally-named Holy Name of Jesus, St. Angela Merici, and St. Norbert Parish on August 1, 2023. The church building housing the merged parish is to be determined.
St. Ann (Normandy)		7530 Natural Bridge Rd., Normandy, MO 63121-4993	
St. Anselm		530 S. Mason Rd., Creve Coeur, MO 63141-8522	
St. Bernadette		68 Sherman Rd., St. Louis, MO 63125-4125 (unincorporated St. Louis County)	To be amalgamated into St. Mark on August 1, 2023.
St. Catherine Laboure (Sappington)		9740 Sappington Rd., St. Louis, MO 63128-1293 (unincorporated St. Louis County)	
St. Clare of Assisi (Ellisville)		15642 Clayton Rd., Ellisville, MO 63011-2398	
St. Clement of Rome		1510 Bopp Rd., Des Peres, MO 63131-4137	
St. Elizabeth of Hungary		1420 S. Sappington Rd., Crestwood, MO 63126-1699	
St. Ferdinand		1765 Charbonier Rd.. Florissant, MO 63031-5497	
St. Francis of Assisi (Oakville)		4556 Telegraph Rd., Oakville, MO 63129-3397	
Ste. Genevieve du Bois (Warson Woods)		1575 N. Woodlawn Ave., Warson Woods, MO 63122-1462	
St. Gerard Majella		1969 Dougherty Ferry Rd., Kirkwood, MO 63122-3538	
St. John Bosco		12934 Marine Ave., Maryland Heights, MO 63146-2234	To be amalgamated into St. Monica on August 1, 2023.
St. John Paul II		4980 Heege Rd, St. Louis, MO 63123-4791 (unincorporated St. Louis County)	In 2018, St. George and St. Dominic Savio merged to form St. John Paul II Parish. To be amalgamated into Seven Holy Founders on August 1, 2023.
St. Joseph (Clayton)		106 N. Meramec Ave., Clayton, MO 63105-3788	
St. Joseph (Manchester)		567 St. Joseph Ln., Manchester, MO 63021-5393	
St. Jude		2218 N. Warson Rd., Overland, MO 63114-2025	To be amalgamated into Holy Spirit on August 1, 2023.
St. Justin Martyr		11910 Eddie and Park Rd., Sunset Hills, MO 63126-2908	
Saint Louis Abbey		500 S Mason Rd, Creve Coeur	
St. Luke the Evangelist		7230 Dale Ave., Richmond Heights, MO 63117-2398	To be amalgamated into Our Lady of Lourdes (University City) on August 1, 2023.
St. Margaret Mary Alacoque		4900 Ringer Rd., St. Louis, MO 63129-1797 (unincorporated St. Louis County)	
St. Mark		4200 Ripa Ave., St. Louis, MO 63125-6815 (unincorporated St. Louis County)	
St. Martin De Porres		615 Dunn Rd., Hazelwood, MO 63042-1725	To be amalgamated into St. Ferdinand on August 1, 2023.
St. Martin of Tours		610 W. Ripa Ave., St. Louis, MO 63125-2524 (unincorporated St. Louis County)	To be amalgamated into St. Mark on August 1, 2023.
St. Mary's		Bridgeton	Former parish
St. Mary Magdalen (Brentwood)		2618 Brentwood Blvd., Brentwood, MO 63144-2319	
St. Mary's Assumption Ukrainian Catholic Church		11363 Oak Branch Dr., St. Louis, MO 63128 (unincorporated St. Louis County)	
St. Matthias		796 Buckley Rd., St. Louis, MO 63125-5348	To be amalgamated into St. Mark on August 1, 2023.
St. Michael the Archangel		7622 Sutherland Ave., Shrewsbury, MO 63119-2895	
St. Monica		12136 Olive Blvd., Creve Coeur, MO 63141-6629	
St. Norbert		16455 New Halls Ferry Rd., Florissant, MO 63031-1199	To be merged into the provisionally-named Holy Name of Jesus, St. Angela Merici, and St. Norbert Parish on August 1, 2023. The church building housing the merged parish is to be determined.
St. Paul (Fenton)		15 Forest Knoll Dr., Fenton, MO 63026-3105	
St. Peter (Kirkwood)		243 W Argonne Dr,. Kirkwood, MO 63122-4295	
St. Richard		11223 Schuetz Rd., Creve Coeur, MO 63146-4932	To be amalgamated into St. Monica on August 1, 2023.
St. Rita		8240 Washington St., Vinita Park, MO 63114-6236	To be amalgamated into Christ the King on August 1, 2023.
St. Rose Philippine Duchesne		1210 Paddock Dr., Florissant, MO 63033-3547	To be amalgamated into Sacred Heart (Florissant) on August 1, 2023.
St. Sabina		1365 Harkee Dr., Florissant, MO 63031-3434	To be amalgamated into St. Ferdinand on August 1, 2023.
St. Simon the Apostle		11011 Mueller Rd., Green Park, MO 63123-6997	
Seven Holy Founders (Affton)		6741 S. Rock Hill Rd., St. Louis, MO 63123-3198 (unincorporated St. Louis County)	

== Warren County ==
Name	Image	Location	Description/sources
Holy Rosary		724 E. Booneslick Rd., Warrenton, MO 63383-2216	
St. Ignatius Loyola		19127 Mill Rd., Marthasville, MO 63357-3096	
St. Vincent de Paul (Dutzow)		13497 S. State Highway 94, Marthasville, MO 63357-2686	

== Washington County ==
Name	Image	Location	Description/sources
St. James (Potosi)		201 N. Missouri Ave., Potosi, MO 63664-1745	
St. Joachim		10120 Crest Rd., Cadet, MO 63630-9629	
St. Joseph (Tiff)		14428 Tiff Rd, Tiff, MO 63674 Postal: c/o 10120 Crest Rd., Cadet, MO 63630-9717	To be amalgamated into St. Joachim on August 1, 2023.
