= Adolphus Druiding =

American architect

- Born: 1839; Hanover, Germany
- Died: 1900 (aged 60–61); Chicago, Illinois, U.S.
- Known for: Adolphus Druiding, Architect

Adolphus Druiding (1838–1900) was a German-born American architect who was known for his work in creating Roman Catholic churches, schools, rectories, and convents. Druiding's work represents a significant body of German Catholic architecture in the United States between the end of the Civil War and 1900.

== Early life and career ==
Druiding was born May 29, 1838, in Aschendorf, a province of Hanover, Germany. He studied at the secondary school in Papenburg and at the Polytechnic School in Munich where he graduated with honors. He worked briefly at a French architect's office and then entered government service in Munich. After this he studied in Berlin under Strach, Adler, and Local. He built one church in Schoenwalde and was employed erecting government stations in the Netherlands.

== Architectural practice ==
In 1865, after completing his work in the Netherlands, Druiding came to the United States where he practiced designing Roman Catholic churches throughout the Midwest.

Druiding was noted as an aggressive businessman who was prepared to assume projects large and small.

== Legacy ==
Druiding was one of approximately 20 American architects involved in the design of Roman Catholic ecclesiastical architecture during the later 19th century. His church buildings have been documented in books on church architecture and are listed on some National Registers.

== Works ==
=== Alabama ===
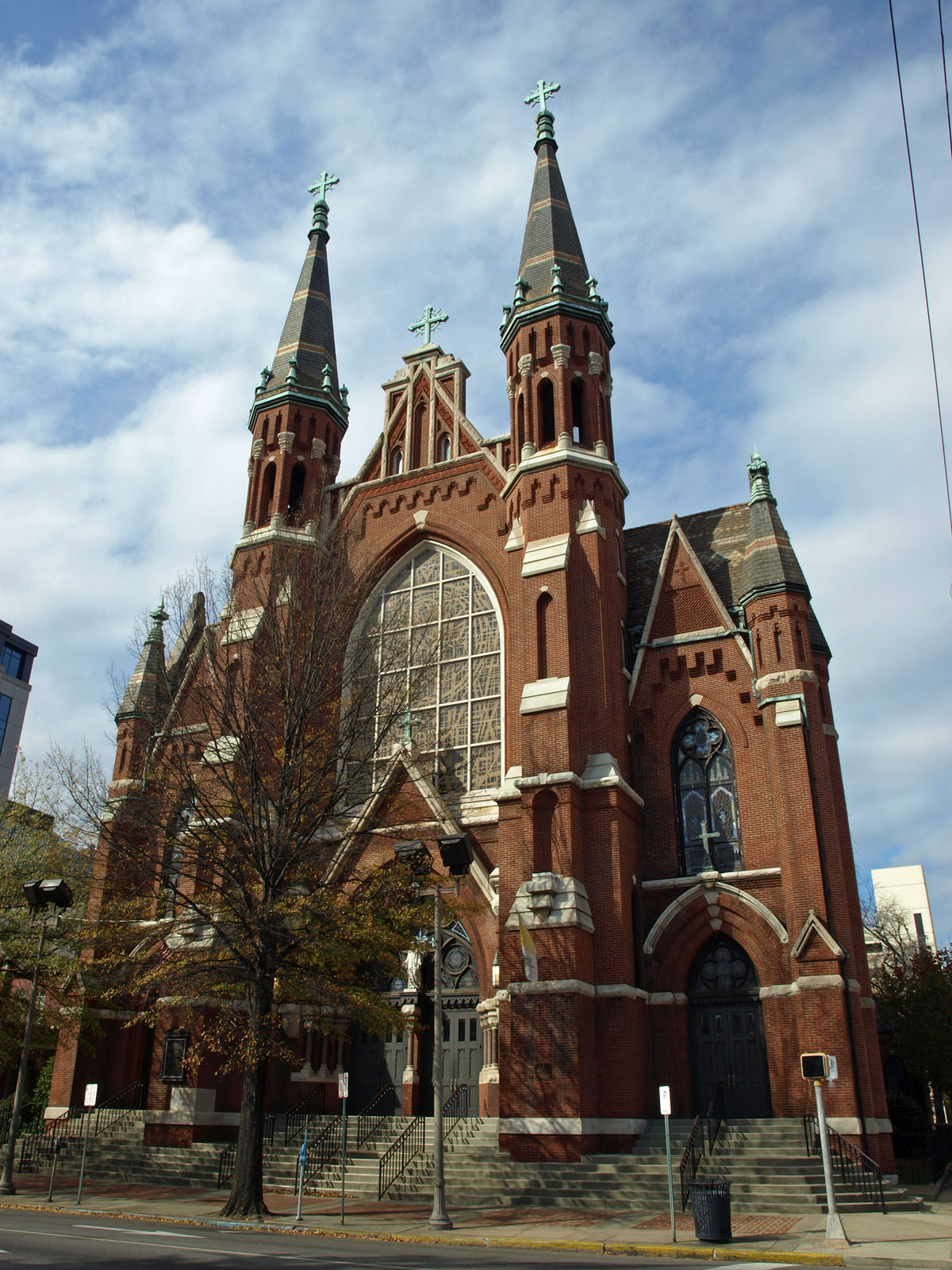
Cathedral of St. Paul, Birmingham, Alabama

- Cathedral of St. Paul in Birmingham

=== Arkansas ===
- Immaculate Conception Church in Fort Smith

=== District of Columbia ===
- St. Anthony of Padua Church in Washington, D.C.

=== Iowa ===
- Blessed Sacrament Church in Sioux City

=== New York ===
- Blessed Sacrament Church in Buffalo
- Church of the Guardian Angel in Brooklyn
- Our Lady of Sorrows Church in Buffalo (now King Urban Life Center)
- Queen of the Most Holy Rosary Church in Bridgehampton
- St. Michael Church in Rochester

=== Ohio ===
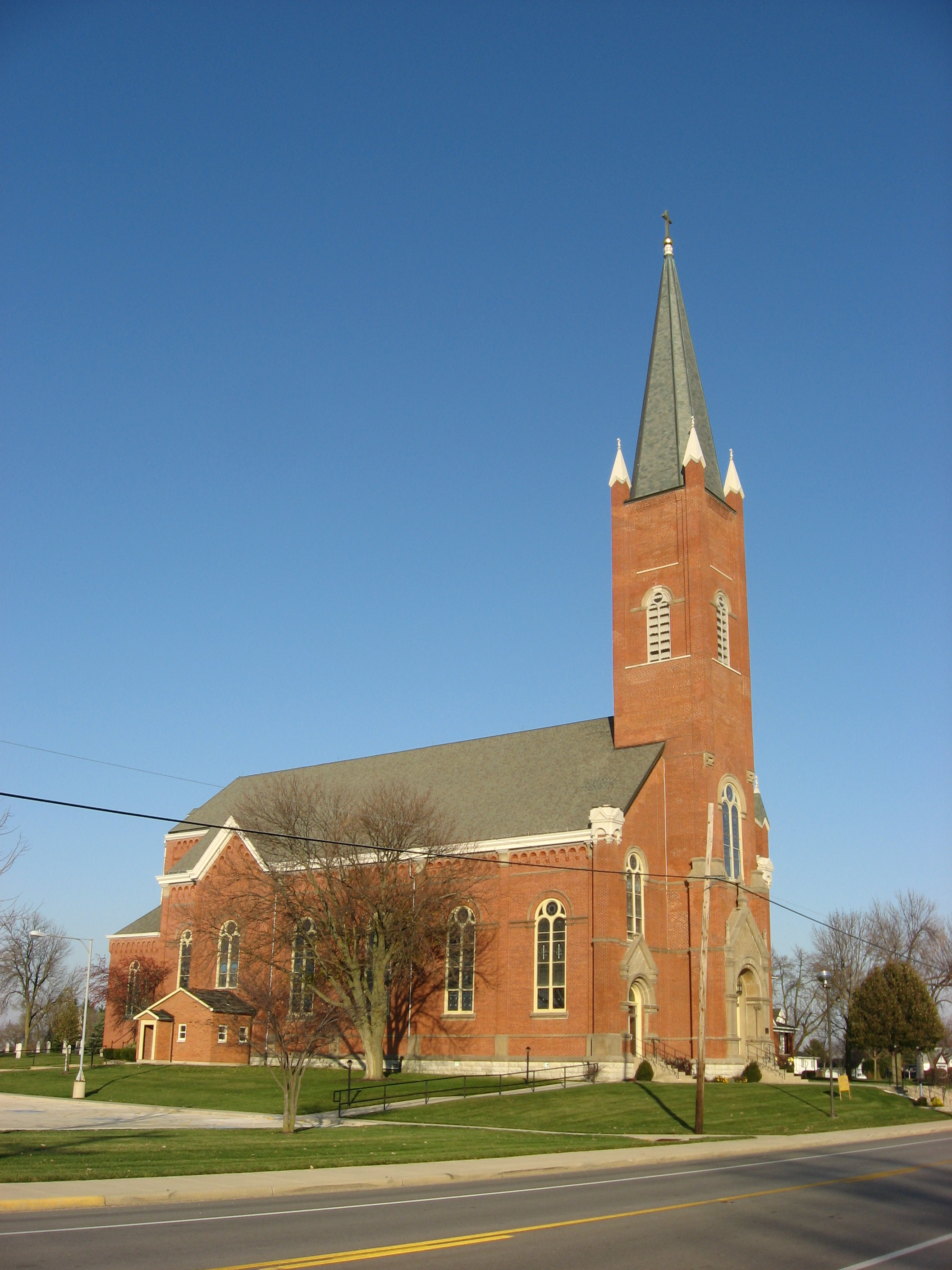
St. John the Baptist, Maria Stein

- Immaculate Conception in Ottoville
- Sacred Heart of Jesus Church in Camp Washington, Cincinnati
- St. Charles Borromeo Church in Carthage, Cincinnati
- St. Aloysius-on-the-Ohio Church in Cincinnati
- St. Michael Church in Cleveland
- St. Henry Church in Harriettsville
- St. John the Baptist Catholic Church in Maria Stein
- St. Henry Catholic Church in St. Henry
- St. Joseph Church in Plymouth
- St. Lawrence Church in Cincinnati
- Our Lady of Perpetual Help Church inCincinnati
- Mt. St. Joseph Sisters of Charity Convent and Mother House in Cincinnati
- St. Mary's Catholic Church in Delaware
- Franciscan Sisters of the Poor – St. Clare Convent & Chapel near Hartwell/ Cincinnati – Springfield Township
- St. Patrick Church in Toledo

=== Illinois ===
- St. Hyacinth Church in Chicago (first church constructed in 1895 and replaced by much larger church by Worthmann and Steinbach)
- St. George Church in Chicago
- St. John Cantius Church in Chicago
- St. Hedwig Church in Chicago

=== Indiana ===
- St. Benedict Church in Terre Haute (destroyed by fire 1930, partially rebuilt)

=== Kentucky ===
- St. Peter Church in Lexington
- St. Stephen Church in New Port

=== Minnesota ===
- Saints Peter and Paul in Glencoe (now St. Pius X)
- Saint Michael in Prior Lake (1890)
- Saint Michael Church in St. Michael
- Saint Mary Church in Waverly

=== Missouri ===
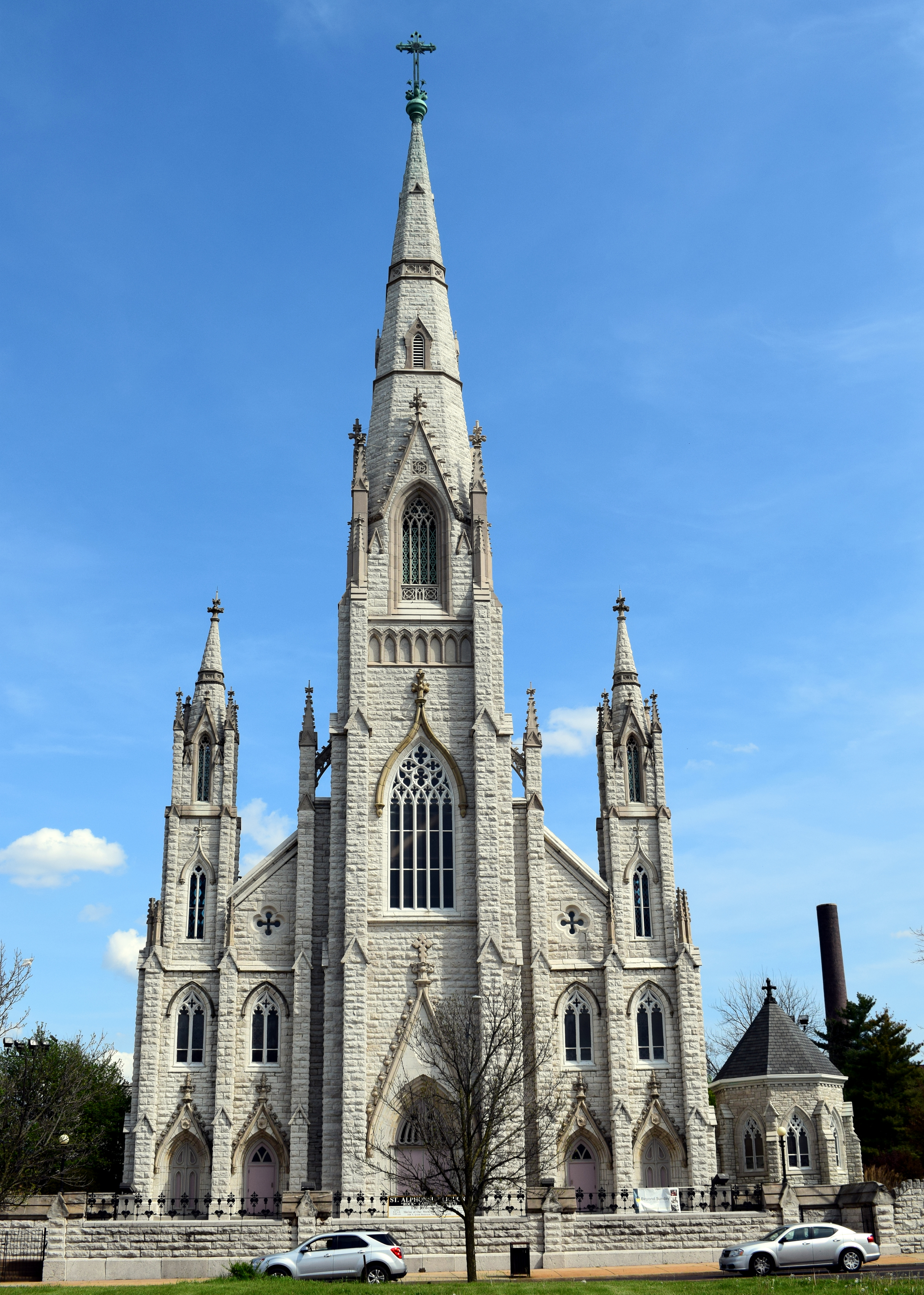
St. Alphonsus Liguori Church, St. Louis

- St. Agatha Church in St. Louis
- Shrine of St. Joseph in St. Louis
- St. John Nepomuk Church in St. Louis
- St. Alphonsus Liguori Church in St. Louis
- St. Peter's Churchin Jefferson City

=== New Jersey ===
- St. Joseph Chapel, Seton Hall University in South Orange

=== Pennsylvania ===
- Ss. Peter and Paul Church in Pittsburgh
- St. Joseph Church in Oil City
- St. Patrick Church, in Philadelphia

=== South Dakota ===
- St. Paul Church in Marty

=== Wisconsin ===
- St. Boniface Church in Manitowoc
- St. Francis Xavier Cathedral in Green Bay
- St. Joseph's Church in Waukesha
- St. Mary Oratory in Wausau
- St. Mary Church in Oshkosh
- St. Mary (originally “of the Immaculate Conception”) Catholic Church in Menasha
- St. Mary's Church in Kaukauna
