= St. Mary's Church and Rectory =

St. Mary's Church and Rectory may refer to:

in the United States

(by state)

- St. Mary's Episcopal Church and Rectory (Milton, Florida), listed on the NRHP in Florida
- St. Mary's Church and Rectory (Iowa City, Iowa), listed on the NRHP in Iowa
- St. Mary's Church and Rectory (Delaware, Ohio), listed on the NRHP in Ohio

== See also ==
- St. Mary's Church (disambiguation)
