= St. Patrick's Catholic Church (Toledo, Ohio) =

- U.S. National Register of Historic Places
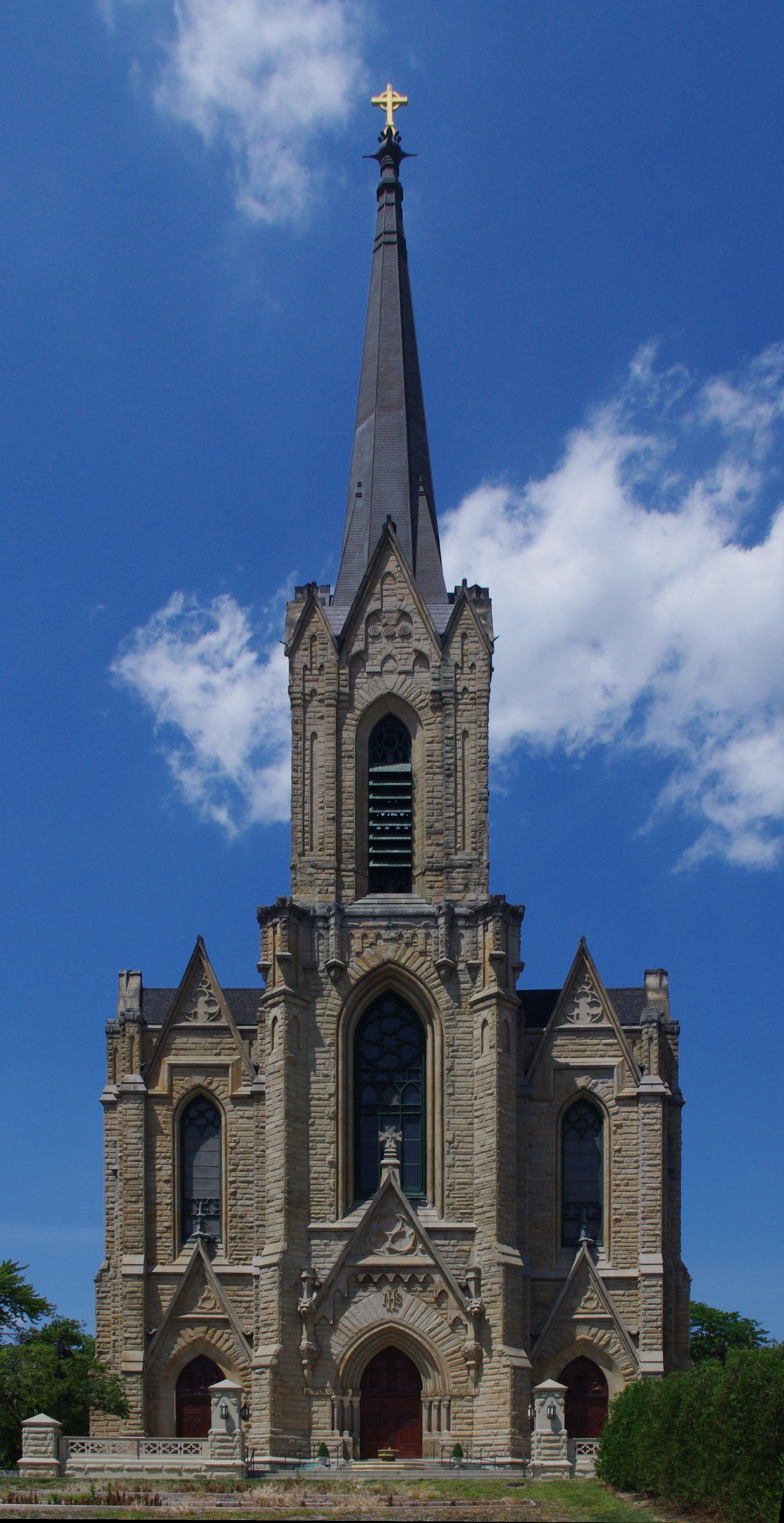
- South Facade

- Location within Ohio Location within the United States
- Location: 13th St. and Avondale Ave., Toledo, Ohio
- Coordinates: 41°38′56″N 83°32′45″W
- Area: less than one acre
- Built: 1901
- Architect: Adolphus Druiding
- Architectural style: Gothic
- NRHP reference No.: 72001033
- Added to NRHP: February 23, 1972

The Church of St. Patrick is a parish of the Roman Catholic Church at 130 Avondale Avenue in Toledo, Ohio, in the Diocese of Toledo. It is noted for its historic parish church, which was listed on the National Register of Historic Places in 1972.

== History ==
The current structure is the second to bear this name. Construction of the first church began in 1862 at the corner of Lafayette and 13th Streets. It was dedicated May 17, 1863 with construction costs totaling $27,000. However, by 1891, the building was deemed unsafe and demolished. Pews and other interior furnishings removed for use in a new building.

== Construction ==
Fr. Edward Hannin, pastor of St. Patrick's, set out to create "the finest church in this part of the land," for his congregation and began to raise money for construction. When it was completed, St. Patrick's was considered one of the finest examples of Gothic Revival architecture in the United States. The exterior is constructed of Amherst blue sandstone and the interior contains ten red granite columns. The church was dedicated on April 13, 1901.

== Alterations ==
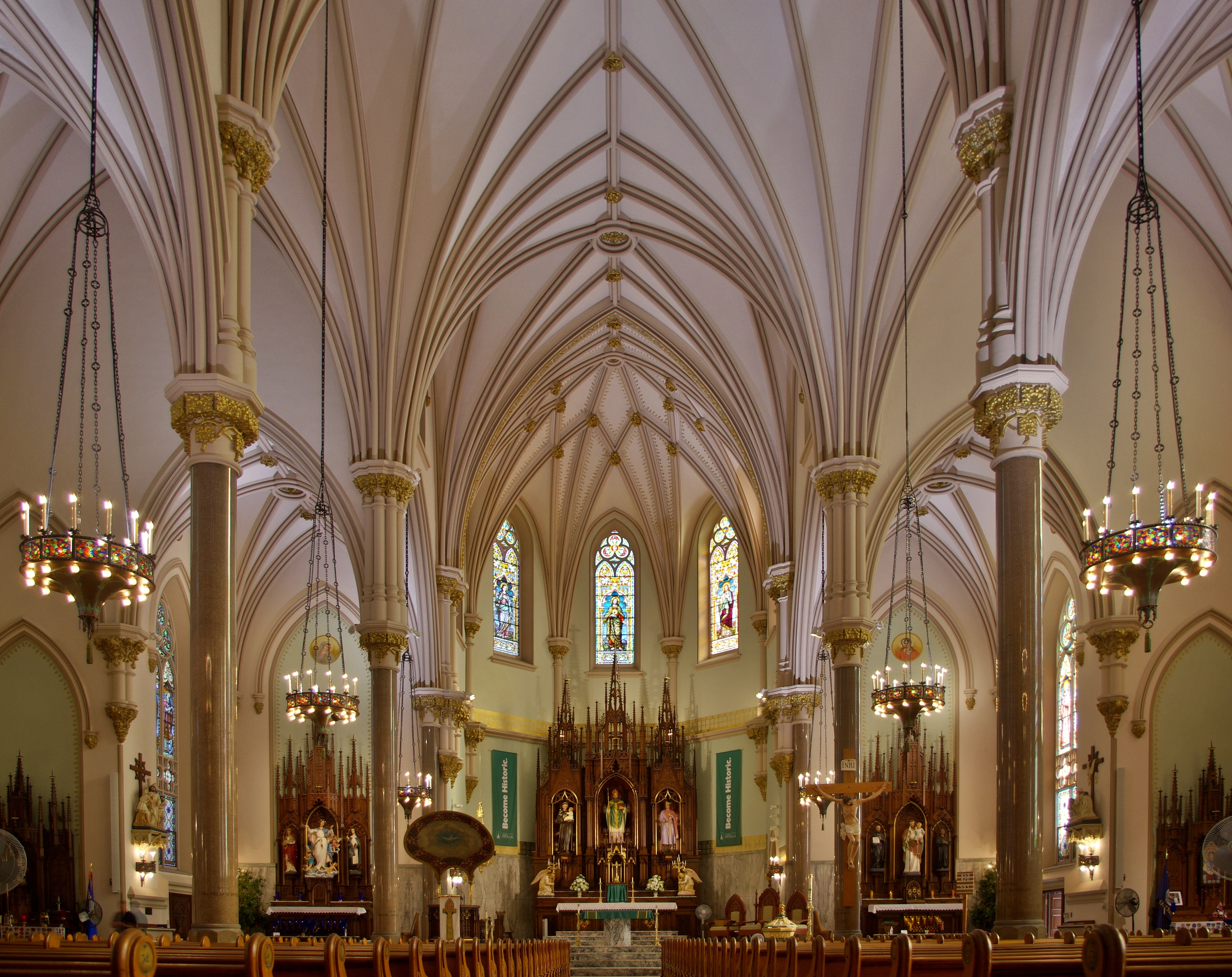
The nave of the church

The church underwent extensive renovations in the 1920s under the guidance of pastor Fr. Francis Keyes. Changes included new chandeliers, flooring and art work. In 1937, a new cross was added to the steeple. On September 9, 1980, the 240 ft (73 m) steeple was destroyed by fire caused by a lightning strike. Falling debris damaged the roof and other portions of the structure. After her death February 25, 2006, Parishioner Margaret Tank bequeathed funds for the steeple's reconstruction and other upgrades in the church. The gift also allowed for repairs to the sanctuary's organ which was also damaged in the 1980 fire. The two-manual Rodgers electronic organ that incorporated 17 ranks of pipes from an earlier Kilgen organ was upgraded to a four-manual instrument. The steeple and other projects were completed August 28, 2007.
