= St. Michael the Archangel Church (Cleveland) =

Historic church in Ohio, United States

- St. Michael the Archangel Catholic Church
- U.S. National Register of Historic Places
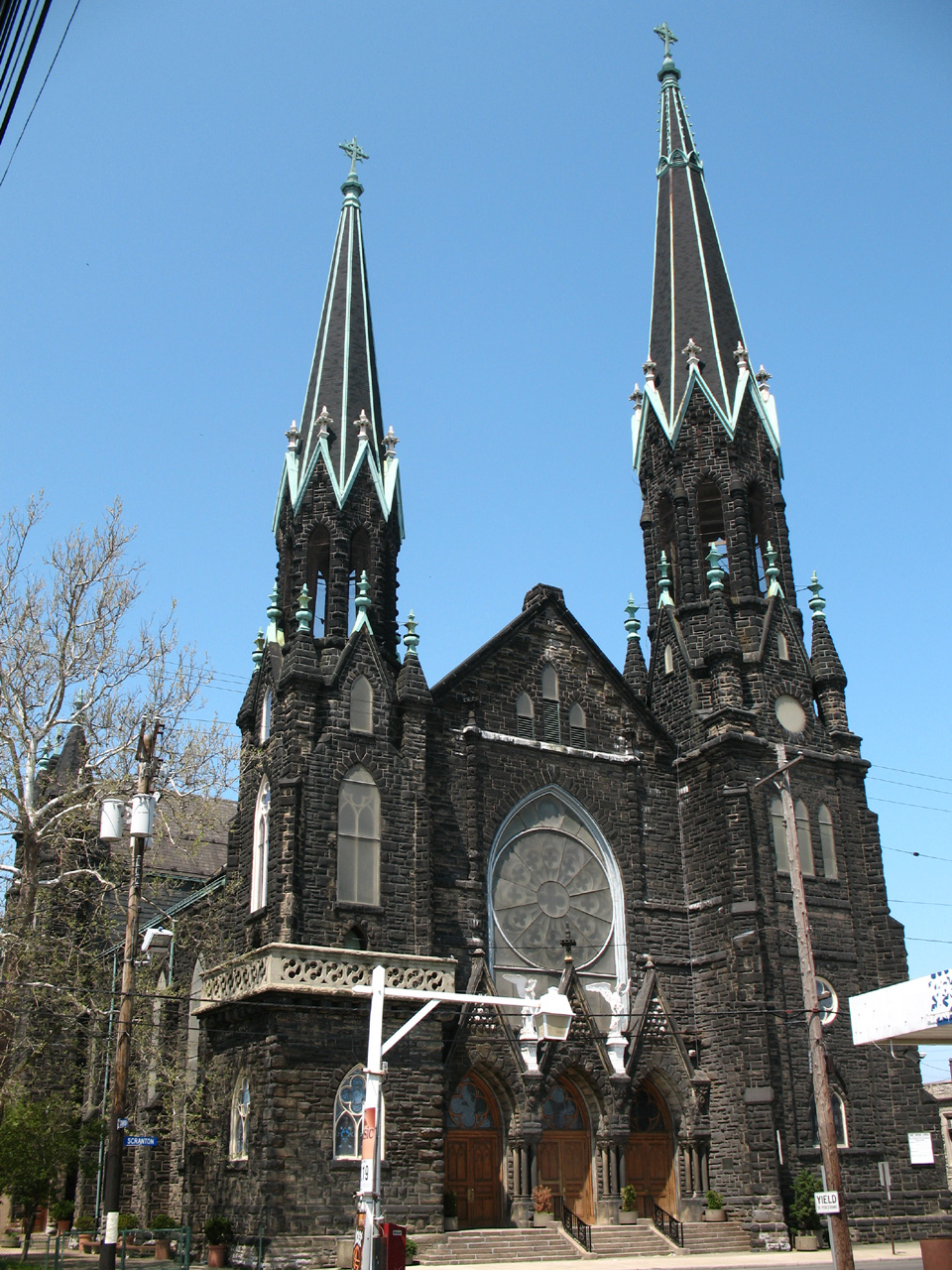
- St. Michael the Archangel Church

- Location within Cleveland Location within Ohio Location within the United States
- Location: 3114 Scranton Rd., Cleveland, Ohio
- Coordinates: 41°28′11″N 81°41′50″W
- Built: 1892
- Architect: Adolphus Druiding
- Architectural style: Gothic
- NRHP reference No.: 74001452
- Added to NRHP: January 18, 1974

St. Michael the Archangel is a Roman Catholic church located at 3114 Scranton Road in the Tremont neighborhood on the west side of Cleveland, Ohio. The church is named in honor of St. Michael the Archangel and was completed in 1892.

== History ==
The congregation was founded in 1881 as a mission of Ohio City, Cleveland's St. Mary's on-the-Flats to serve a growing German immigrant population on Cleveland's west side. The original church and school building were constructed in 1883 but burned on June 29, 1891, while the new building was under construction. The current church, which had its cornerstone laid in 1889, was completed five years ahead of schedule in 1892.

The church congregation reached its peak size in the 1950, when only 25% of the parishioners were of German descent. The first Spanish Mass was said in 1971 for the growing number of Hispanic parishioners. The congregation now is mostly Latin American. The church now offers Masses in both English and Spanish. An annual Good Friday Procession begins or ends at St. Michael's. St Michael's and La Sagrada Familia church alternate every year to begin or end at one of the two churches. There is a stop at St Patrick's on Bridge Avenue to hear the first part of Mass before continuing on the journey to either St Michael's or La Sagrada Familia. The parish has become a center of Hispanic culture in Cleveland.

== Architecture ==
The church building is considered a good example of High Victorian Gothic architecture with its two towers of unequal height, the taller of which rises 232 feet (71 m), and three archways. An architecturally notable school adjacent to the church began construction in 1906 and was completed in 1907. For many years the church was one of the most costly and artistically notable churches in the Cleveland Diocese.
