= Basilica of Saint Louis, King of France =

Church building in St. Louis, Missouri, US

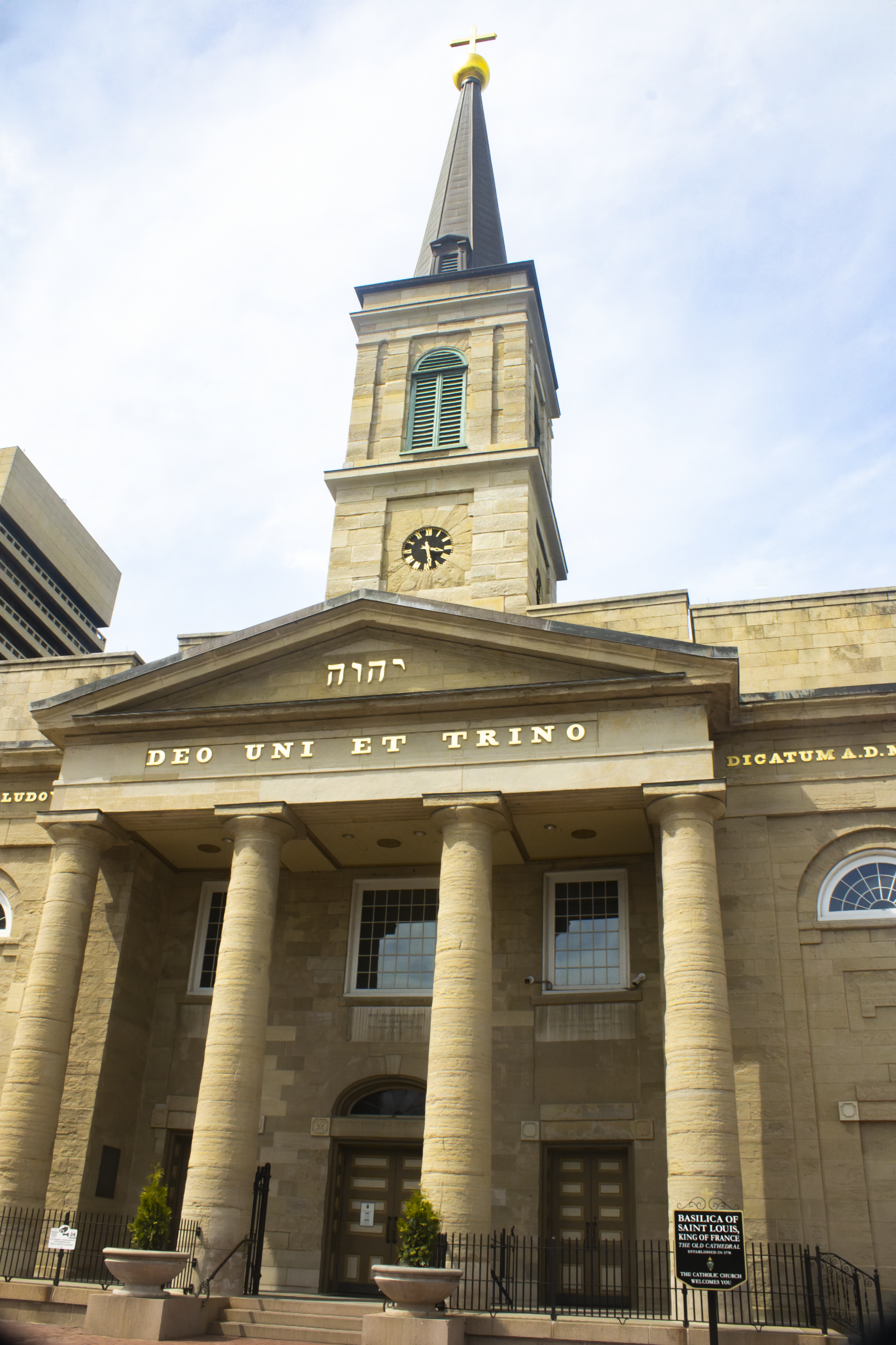
- The Basilica in 2026

Religion
- Affiliation: Roman Catholic
- Ecclesiastical or organisational status: Minor basilica

Location
- Location: 209 Walnut Street, St. Louis, Missouri, United States
- Interactive map of Basilica of Saint Louis, King of France
- Coordinates: 38.624121°N 90.187229°W

Architecture
- Architects: Joseph Laveille and George Morton
- Style: Greek Revival
- Groundbreaking: 1770 (first church); 1831 (current church)
- Completed: 1834

Specifications
- Direction of façade: South by west
- Length: 134 feet (41 m)
- Width: 84 feet (26 m)
- Height (max): 95 feet (29 m)
- Materials: Limestone
- St. Louis Landmark

Website
- Basilica of St. Louis, King of France

The Basilica of Saint Louis, King of France (French: Basilique Saint-Louis-Roi-de-France), formerly the Cathedral of Saint Louis, and colloquially the Old Cathedral, is a Catholic church in St. Louis, Missouri. It was the first cathedral west of the Mississippi River and until 1844 the only parish church in St. Louis. It is one of two Catholic basilicas in St. Louis (with the current cathedral) and both are named for King Louis IX of France, the city's namesake.

The current structure (built 1831–1834) is located near the historic riverfront of St. Louis. It is surrounded by Gateway Arch National Park. However, the church is not part of the park. Because of the historical significance of the church, it was left intact while all neighboring buildings were demolished to make way for the Gateway Arch and related park. Rev. Nicholas Smith serves as Rector.

The basilica serves as a personal parish church rather than a territorial parish church. It ranks 177th of 196 churches in number of Catholics per church in the Archdiocese of St. Louis. However, because of its historical significance (and its location along the Mississippi River near the iconic Arch), the basilica remains a popular church for marriage ceremonies in the archdiocese (ranking second of 196 churches) and a popular tourist destination.

== History ==
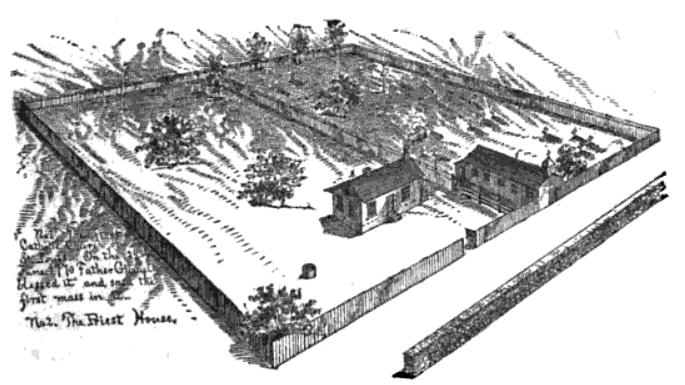
The first Catholic church in St. Louis, built in 1770, and replaced by the current structure

=== Previous structures ===
When Pierre Laclède and Auguste Chouteau established the city of St. Louis, they dedicated a plot of land west of Laclède's home for the purposes of the Catholic Church. The earliest Catholic records suggest that a tent was used by an itinerant priest in 1766, but by 1770 a small log house was built on the site. This building, consecrated by the Reverend Pierre Gibault, an itinerant priest, on June 24, 1770, was expanded in 1776 to include a log church. In spite of a more substantial structure, no priest permanently resided in the village of St. Louis until 1811.

These buildings began to be replaced in 1818 with a brick structure, on the orders of the Bishop Louis William Valentine Dubourg. The brick structure was designed by Gabriel Paul. During Dubourg's tenure as bishop, many artifacts, paintings, and an organ were donated to the church. While the brick church was under construction, a cemetery was established near the building, in which many of the founders of St. Louis were interred. The current church was built on the ground of the original cemetery. Those buried in the original cemetery were either moved to “Second Catholic cemetery” or reinterred under the current church. There were no burials at the original cemetery after 1828. Those moved to Second Catholic Cemetery and those buried after that were ordered removed in the mid-1850s; they were moved to Calvary Cemetery after 1854. The current church was completed and dedicated in 1834. (Forgotten but not Gone, Tour of St. Louis’ Earliest Cemetery and Where it Went - Landmarks Assn of St. Louis, Inc.)

Additionally, Dubourg was influential in the establishment of St. Louis Academy (which later developed as Saint Louis University) in a two-story brick building adjacent to the new church in 1818. Construction of the brick church was not complete until 1821.

=== Construction ===
In 1826, population growth prompted the establishment of the Diocese of St. Louis. The first bishop of the St. Louis diocese, Joseph Rosati, began construction of a new cathedral, now the Basilica of St. Louis, King of France, to mark this growth. The cornerstone of the church was laid by Rosati during a ceremony on August 1, 1831.

The church was designed and built by the architectural firm of Laveille and Morton, among the first architectural firms west of the Mississippi River north of New Orleans. Construction was complete by late 1834. On Sunday, October 26, 1834, the cathedral was consecrated at a ceremony featuring the local militia and parishioners.

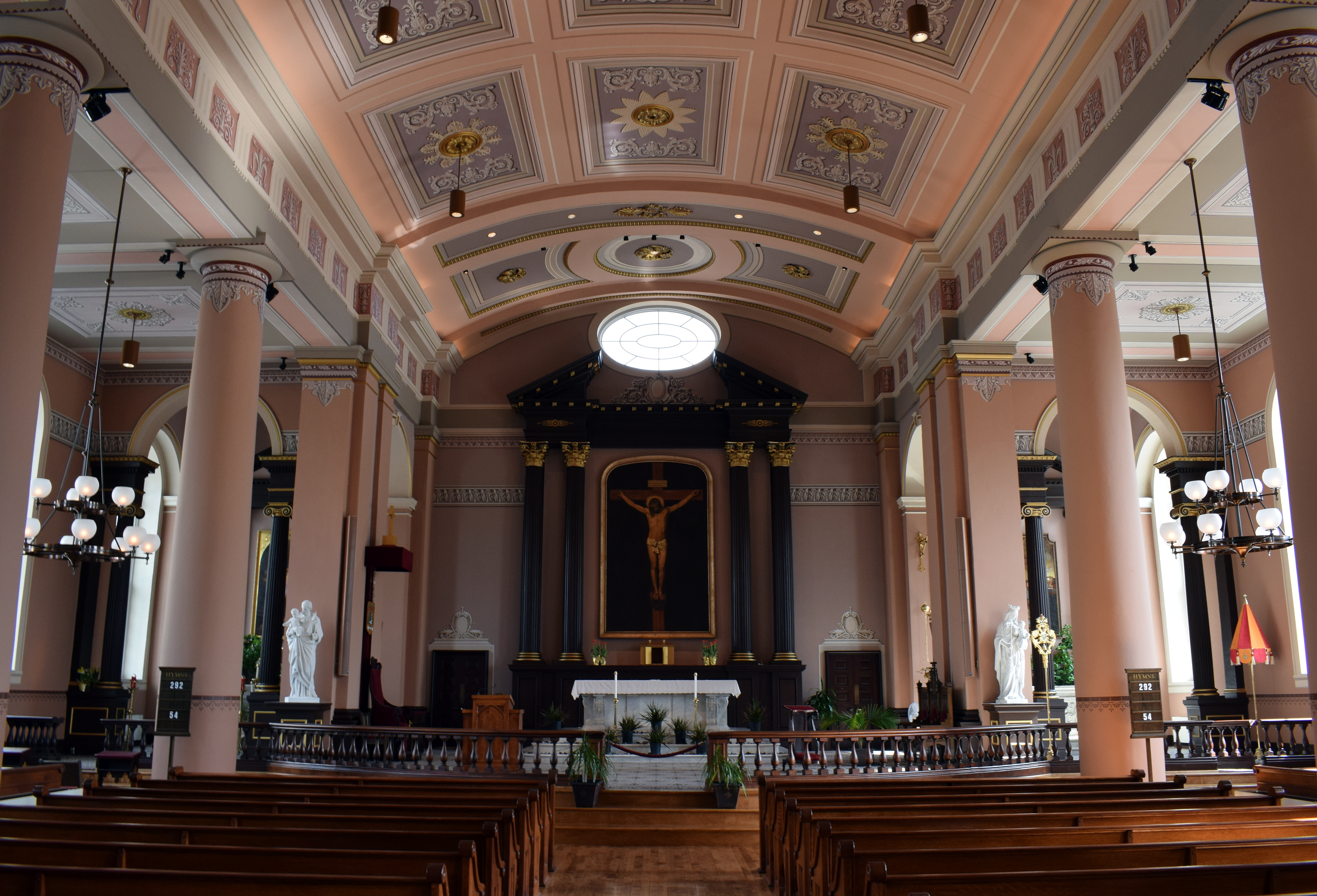
Refurbished interior

After the elevation of the Diocese of St. Louis to archdiocese status in 1847, the cathedral became home to an early chapter of the Society of Saint Vincent de Paul, a Catholic charity for the indigent. Both Archbishop Peter Richard Kenrick and St. Louis Mayor Bryan Mullanphy were counted among the founders of the chapter, initially dedicated to assisting immigrants at a time of waves of immigration from Ireland and Germany, but later expanding to all St. Louis residents.

The tradition of care for the poor and needy was carried on in the early 20th century after the appointment of the Reverend John Tannrath to head the church on September 5, 1915. Tannrath not only refurbished the rectory and church, but also reestablished a parish school for local immigrant children. He arranged care for disabled children and adults.

=== Recent history ===
The city's growth led to a larger church being consecrated in 1914, farther west of the current church, in the Central West End neighborhood. This larger church, the Cathedral Basilica of Saint Louis, continues to serve as the seat of the archbishop of St. Louis. To recognize the original cathedral's significance, on January 27, 1961, Pope John XXIII designated it a basilica, giving it the present name, the Basilica of Saint Louis, King of France. Shortly after, in 1963, the church was renovated by the prominent St. Louis architectural firm Murphy and Mackey.

In 2015, the Basilica underwent a restoration, including:

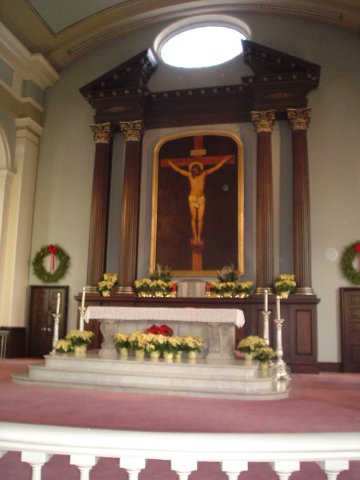
Main altar in marble with copy of Diego Velazquez's The Crucifixion

- Repaired exterior limestone and sandstone
- Replaced the mullioned windows with energy efficient yet historically accurate glass in the original Gothic design
- Repaired the steeple, roofs, and gutters
- Restored the front doors
- Upgraded the parking lot, entrance pavers, and landscaping
- Renovated the interior vestibule
- Removed all carpet, leaving and repairing the wood floors
- Restored decorative millwork and statuary.

The current parish serves the needs of local parishioners, described as "few in number but strong in loyalty", along with working people and tourists. However, because of its location along the Mississippi River and near the Gateway Arch (which provide backdrops for wedding photos) the church is often used for weddings, only ranking behind St. Francis Xavier College Church at Saint Louis University in the number of Catholic marriages in the archdiocese.

== Design and artifacts ==
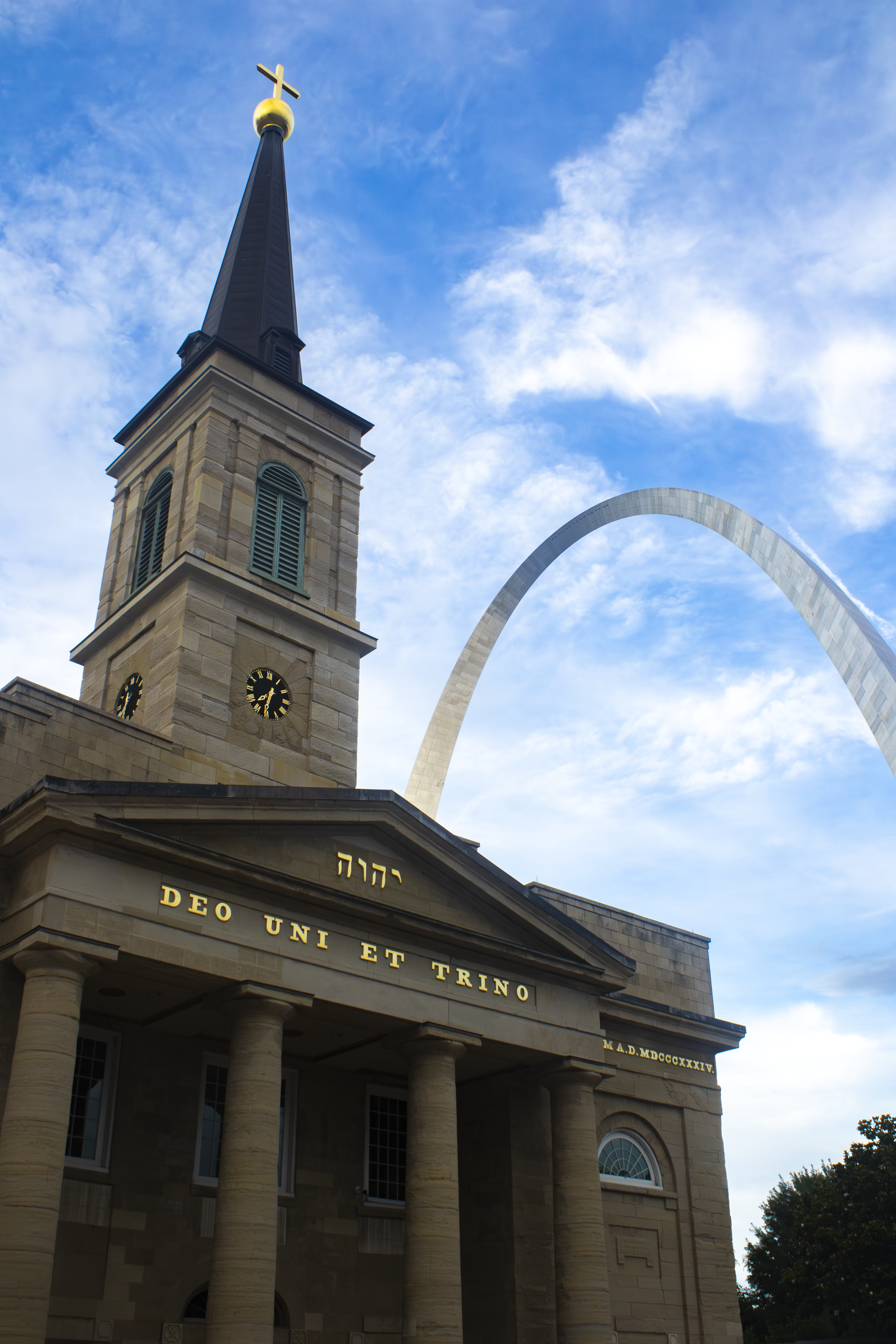
Gateway Arch and Old Cathedral

Built in Greek Revival style, the church is noted for its marble altars, a painting of Saint Louis venerating the Crown of Thorns given by Louis XVIII, King of France and Navarre, and an accurate copy of the painting of the Crucifixion by Diego Velázquez installed in the church in the latter half of the twentieth century.

Engraved in gold over the entrance to the church are the words In honorem s. Ludovici. Deo uni et trino dicatum. A. MDCCCXXXIV, which translates as "In honor of St. Louis. Dedicated to the one and triune God. A.D. 1834". Hebrew letters, intended to spell out the Tetragrammaton, are also inscribed in Hebrew above the engraving on the main entrance. An urban legend of unknown origin claims that "the letter Heth was substituted for the letter He, so the inscription merely reads yachuch, which has no meaning in Hebrew"; however, the letters in the inscription appear to indeed be He.

The church basement has a number of artifacts associated with the history of the Roman Catholic Archdiocese of Saint Louis, including a bell given to the church by the governor of the territory of Louisiana during the early 19th century. Bishop Joseph Rosati, who ordered the construction of the church, is interred in a vault underneath the sanctuary.

== See also ==
- List of churches in the Roman Catholic Archdiocese of St. Louis
- List of Catholic cathedrals in the United States
- List of cathedrals in the United States
