= St. Joseph's Catholic Church Complex (Waukesha, Wisconsin) =

Historic church in Wisconsin, United States

- U.S. National Register of Historic Places
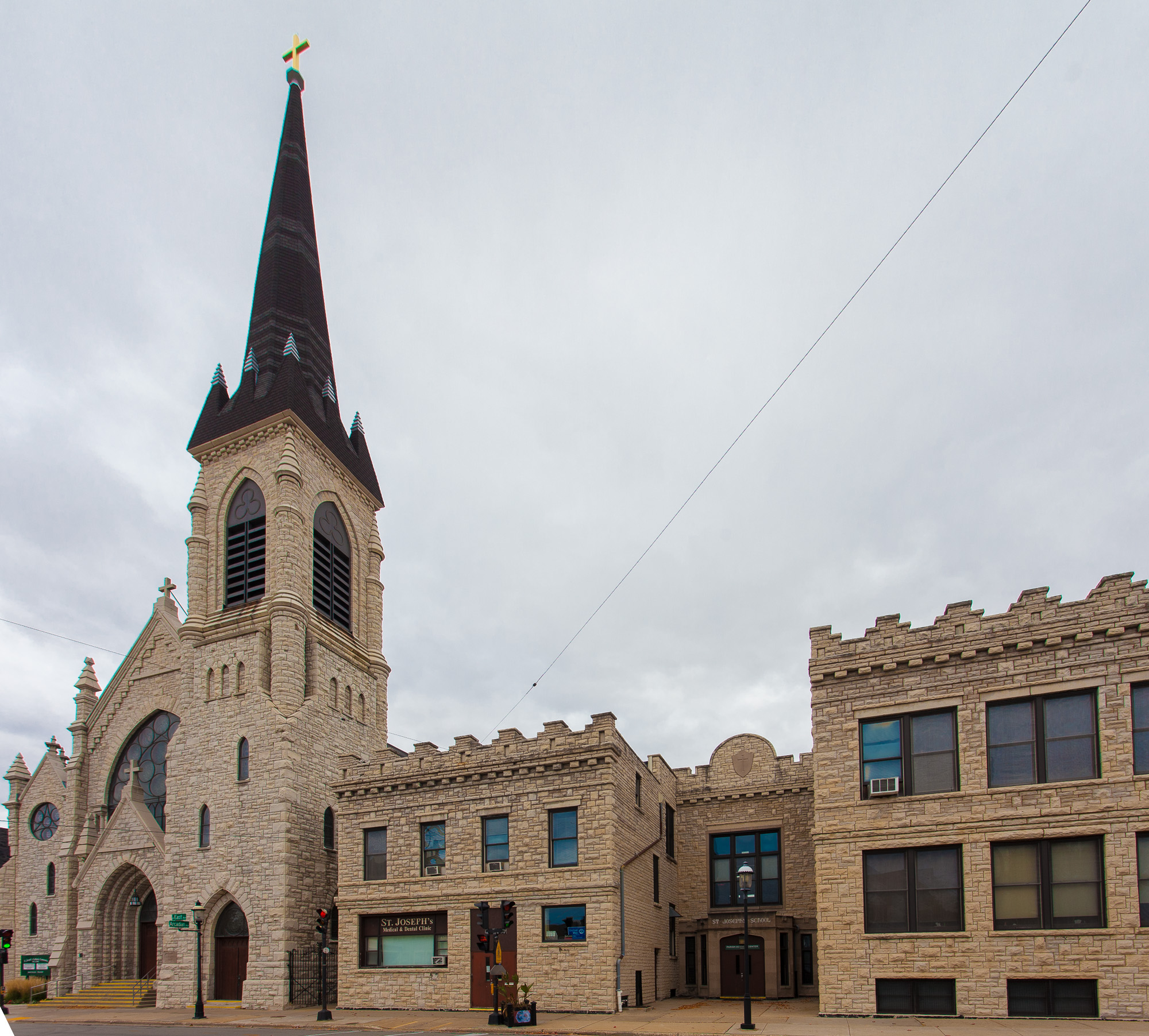

- Location within Wisconsin Location within the United States
- Location: 818 N. East Ave., Waukesha, Wisconsin
- Coordinates: 43°0′27″N 88°13′37″W
- Area: 1.9 acres (0.77 ha)
- Built: 1888
- Architect: A. Druiding
- Architectural style: Greek Revival, Late Victorian
- MPS: Waukesha MRA
- NRHP reference No.: 83004355
- Added to NRHP: October 28, 1983

St. Joseph's Catholic Church Complex is located in Waukesha, Wisconsin. The church building itself was built in 1888. On October 28, 1983, the complex was added to the National Register of Historic Places for its architectural significance.

St. Joseph's Parish was organized in 1842, the first Roman Catholic church in Waukesha. Solomon Juneau donated the first church building, which was a log cabin on the site of the current complex. In 1844 the parish built a stone church building, which has since served as a parish hall, school, and medical clinic. This 1844 building has been remodeled enough that it is not part of the NRHP nomination.

In 1888 the parish began building a larger church building. Adolphus Druiding of Chicago designed it in High Victorian Gothic style, with its emphasis on the vertical. The exterior is rock-faced, randomly-coursed limestone, with multiple rose windows, lancet windows, and multiple gables and spires. Each gable is topped with a cross. The layout is asymmetric, with a large tower on one side of the main entrance, rising to a tall steeple topped with a cross.

The Brown House is the other part of the complex that is part of the NRHP nomination. It was built around 1878, a two-story brick house with Greek Revival massing and Italianate details. It was originally the home of Martin Brown, a harness maker. The church later used the house as a convent.

Both the church building and the Brown house were nominated to the NRHP for their architectural significance. They are some of the best surviving examples of their styles in Waukesha.
