= St. John Cantius Church (Chicago) =

Latin Catholic Church in Chicago, Illinois US

Saint John Cantius Church
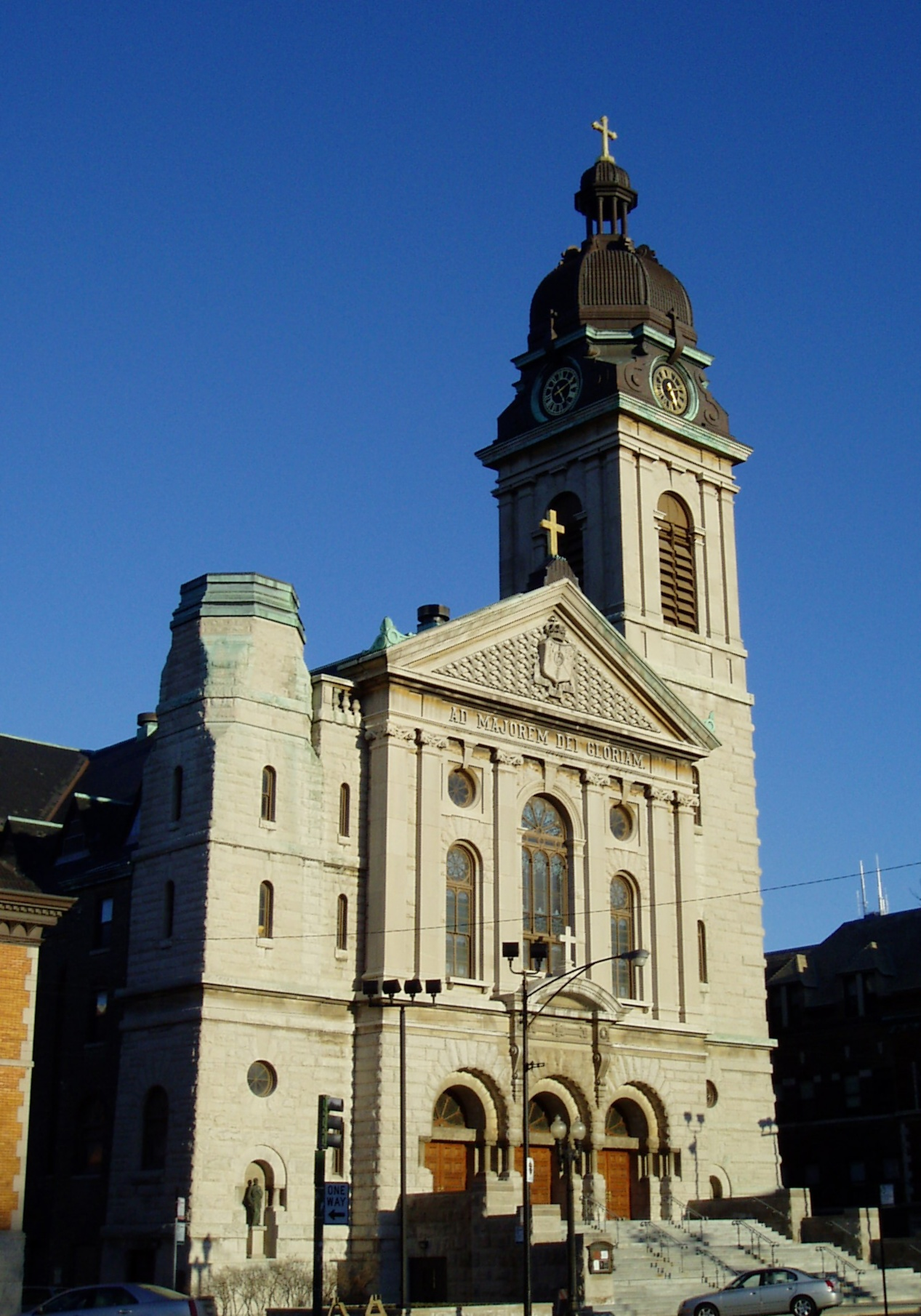
- The church façade in 2015
- Saint John Cantius Church
- 41°53′48.6″N 87°39′12″W
- Location: Chicago, Illinois
- Address: 825 North Carpenter Street
- Country: United States
- Denomination: Catholic Church
- Sui iuris church: Latin Church
- Website: cantius.org

History
- Founded: 1893; 133 years ago
- Founder: Congregation of the Resurrection
- Dedication: St. John Cantius
- Dedicated: September 4, 1893
- Consecrated: December 11, 1898

Architecture
- Architect: Adolphus Druiding
- Style: Polish Cathedral style, Baroque
- Groundbreaking: 1893
- Completed: 1898
- Construction cost: $130,000

Specifications
- Capacity: 2,000
- Length: 230 feet (70 m)
- Width: 107 feet (33 m)
- Materials: Rusticated Limestone and Brick

Clergy
- Pastor(s): Rev. David Yallaly, SJC

Saint John Cantius Church (Polish: Kościół Świętego Jana Kantego) is a Latin Catholic parish of the Archdiocese of Chicago. It is operated by the Canons Regular of St. John Cantius.

In addition to St. Mary of the Angels, St. Hedwig's and St. Wenceslaus, it is one of the many Polish churches that overlook the nearby Kennedy Expressway.

The interior has been retained and restored and is reminiscent of the art and architecture of 18th century Kraków. In 2013, the parish completed a significant restoration. The 130 feet (40 m) tower is readily seen from the Kennedy Expressway and is a landmark in Chicago's West Town neighborhood, located at 825 North Carpenter Street.

== History ==
The arrival and settlement of Polish immigrants in the area, known as "Expatriate Poland" (Polish: Wygnana Polska), necessitated the foundation of a new parish which would become Saint John Cantius Church. In 1892, these immigrants petitioned the pastor of St. Stanislaus Kostka, the first Polish church in the Archdiocese, for a new church. Fr. Vincent Barzyński of the Congregation of the Resurrection, saw the validity of this request and immediately purchased several lots at Fry and Carpenter Streets for the sum of $75,000.

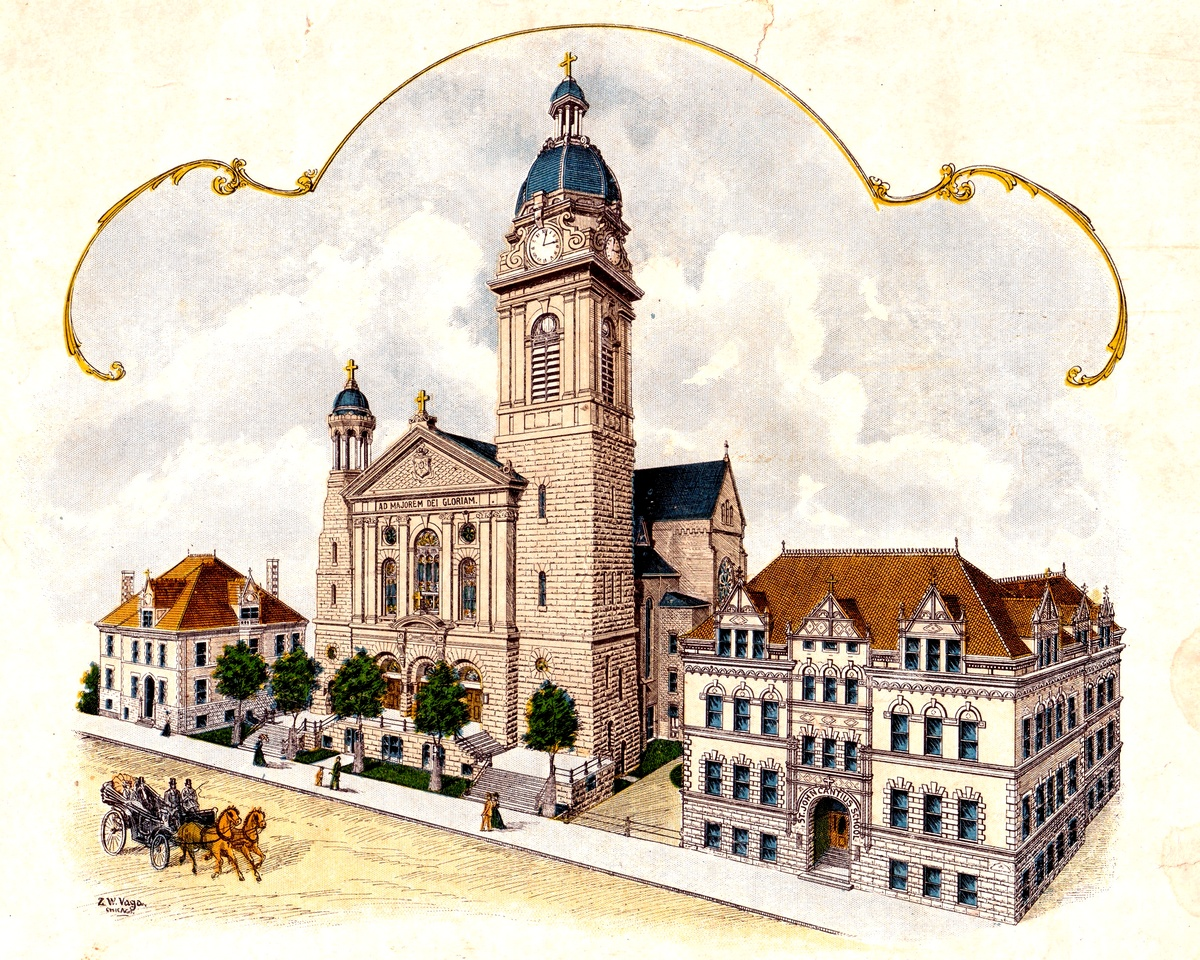
A 1909 postcard showing St. John Cantius Church, Rectory, and School.

Designed by Adolphus Druiding, St. John Cantius Church took five years to build. Work began in the spring of 1893 with the cornerstone laid and blessed in July of that year. By December, only the finished basement church was completed. The new parish community held its first Mass in the basement on Christmas Eve.

When the exterior was complete, Archbishop Patrick Feehan performed the blessing and dedication ceremonies on December 11, 1898.

In 1918 there were about 23,000 parishioners and 2,500 children in the school. The building of the Kennedy Expressway cut through the neighborhood and began a period of decline for the parish as many residents relocated and the parish school closed.

== Architecture ==
The Church building's design is by Adolphus Druiding. Work began on the structure in the spring of 1893 and was completed by 1898. The building has a façade of rusticated stone in the High Renaissance style. At the very top is a pediment decorated with the coat of arms of Poland's failed January Uprising, under which is found the inscription "Boże Zbaw Polskę" (God Save Poland in Polish). Just below this on the entablature, is the Latin inscription "Ad maiorem Dei Gloriam", a text which proclaims that this building is for the Greater Glory of God, a Jesuit motto popular in many churches built around the start of the 20th century. Three Romanesque arches lead into the interior. The entrance is flanked by two asymmetrical towers, 200 feet (61 m) and 100 feet (30 m) in height, styled after St. Mary's Basilica in Kraków. The whole structure is 230 feet (70 m) long and 107 feet (33 m) wide.

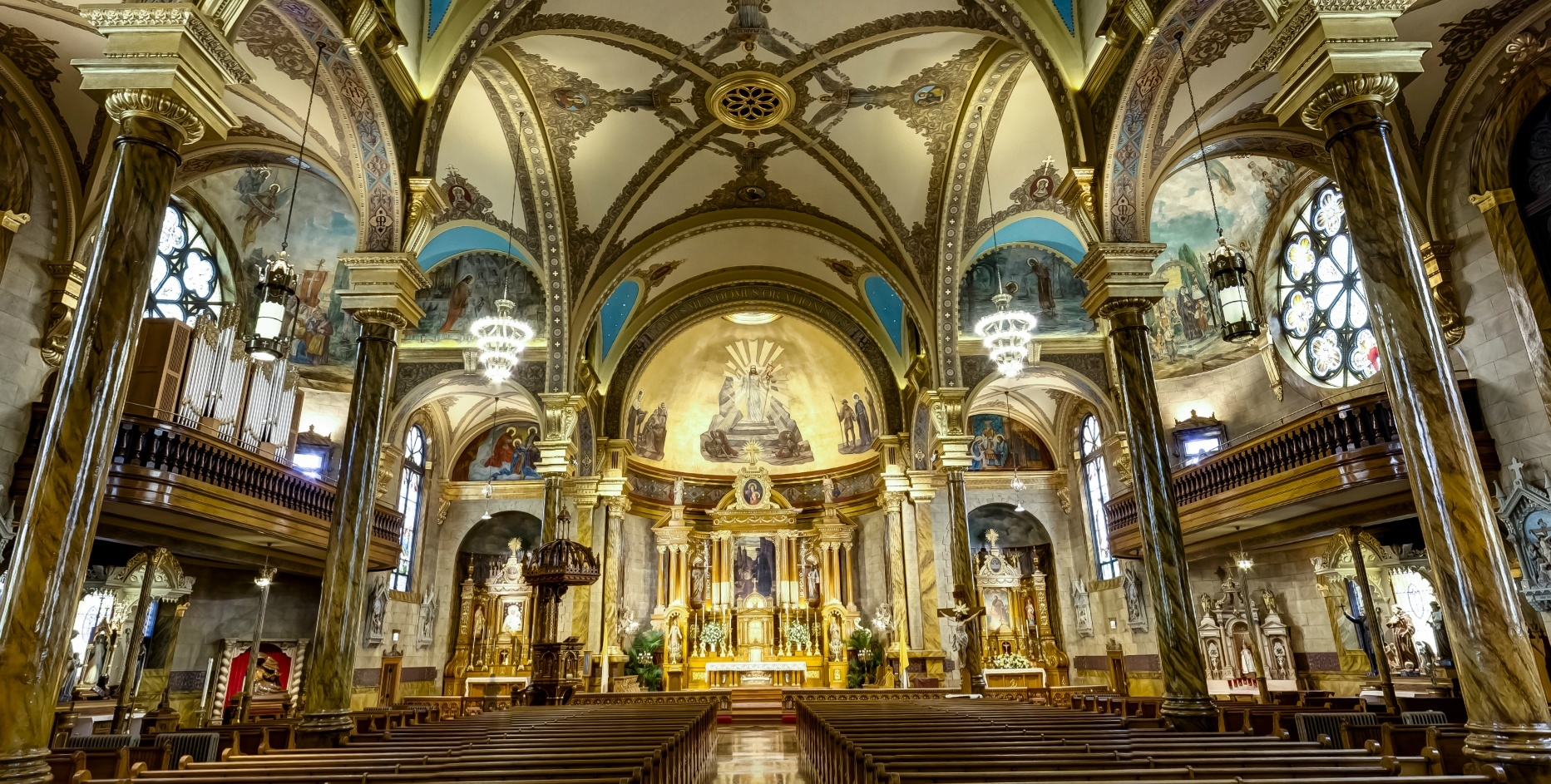
The Baroque interior of Saint John Cantius Church

The interior is in the Baroque style, eight stone columns support the vault. In 1903 the interior was painted for the first time, and it was at this time that all the plaster and wood ornament were added. The stained glass windows were made by Gawin Co. of Milwaukee, while the interior murals were painted by Lesiewicz around 1920. Including religious scenes, and images of Polish patron saints.

An inlaid hardwood floor was installed in St. John Cantius Church in 1997 in a design by Jed Gibbons. Sixteen varieties of wood from around the world were used for the inlaid medallions. The sacred art of the floor is designed as a teaching tool. The medallions inlaid into the main aisle tell the story of salvation: Star of David—Jesus was born as a Jew; Three Crowns—with the arrival of the Three Kings Jesus was made manifest to the world and, in Christian baptism, one is born priest, prophet, and king; Instruments of the Passion—Christ's suffering for our Salvation; Banner—the Resurrection; Star—Christ is the Light of the World.

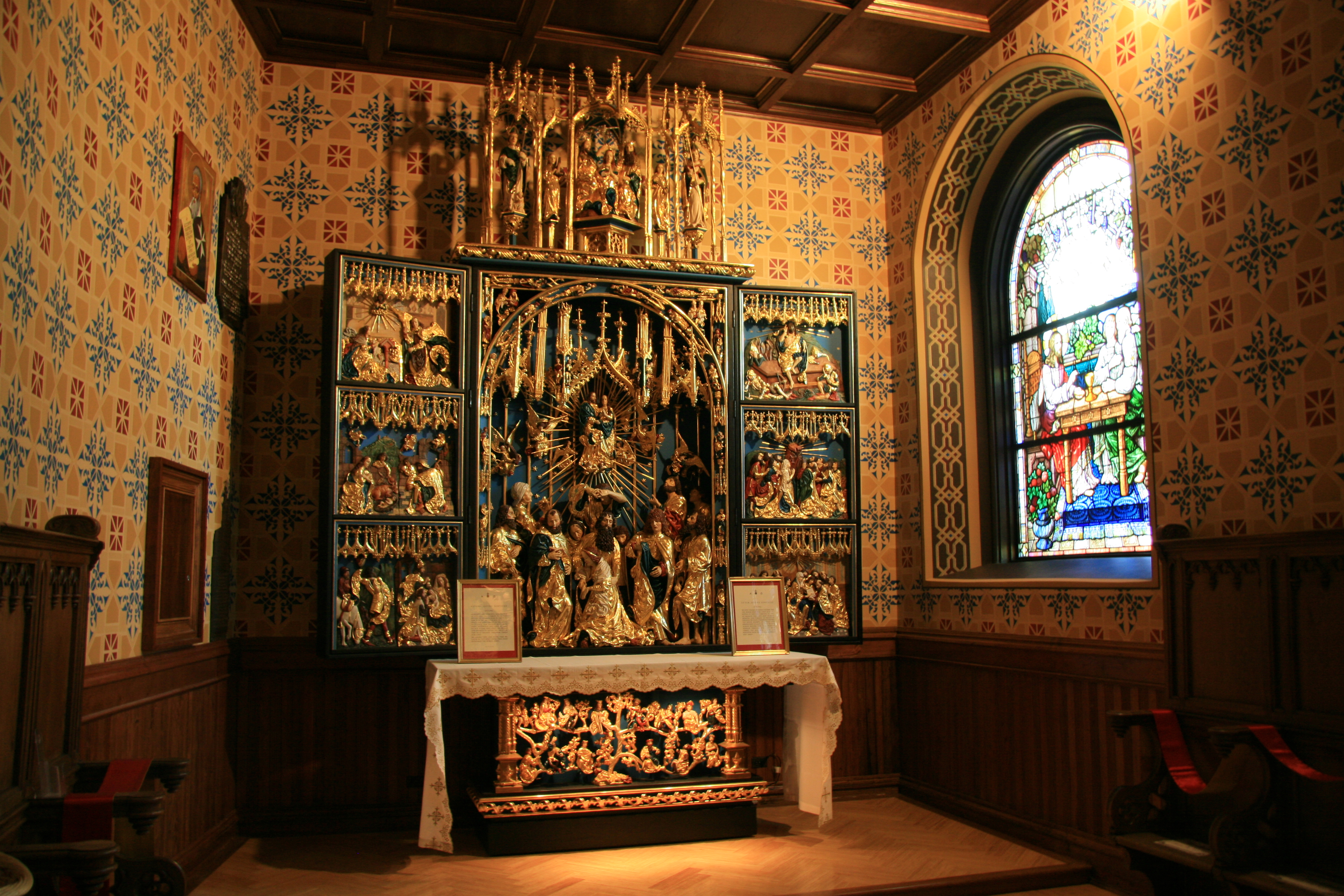
Replica of the Veit Stoss Altar

In 2003, work was completed on a replica of the renowned Veit Stoss Altar (Polish: Ołtarz Wita Stwosza) of St. Mary's Basilica in Kraków. Carved by artist Michał Batkiewicz over an eight-year period, this one-third scale copy was commissioned as a tribute to the Galician immigrants who founded the parish in 1893.

A permanent exhibit of sacred art is located in the church's north tower. The collection's centerpiece is a Neapolitan "presepio" (Italian for creche) from Rome. The parish also has a nineteenth-century copy of the icon of Our Lady of Częstochowa adorned with jeweled crowns blessed by Pope John Paul II; a reproduction of a crucifix from Limpus, Portugal, a nineteenth-century Pietà from Bavaria, Germany, a hand written altar missal on display, as well as several hundred authenticated relics of saints.

== St. John Cantius in literature and film ==
St. John Cantius was featured in two films that were both shot in the summer and fall of 1990. The first was a made-for-television movie, entitled Johnny Ryan. The second was a major Hollywood film entitled, Only the Lonely, directed by John Hughes and starring Maureen O'Hara and John Candy.

The parish was also featured in two documentaries: the 2008 television special, St. John Cantius: Restoring the Sacred produced by StoryTel that aired on EWTN, and the 2023 feature, Holy Ground.

St. John Cantius also serves as the backdrop for Steffi Rostenkowski's great realization in Nelson Algren's work Never Come Morning where, night after night, she heard the iron rocking of the bells of Saint John Cantius. Each night they came nearer till the roar of The Loop was only a troubled whimper beneath the rocking of the bells. "Everyone lives in the same big room", she would tell herself, as they rocked. "But nobody's speakin' to anyone else, an' nobody got a key".

== St. John Cantius in architecture books ==
St. John Cantius is featured in a number of books on Chicago architecture, most notably The AIA Guide to Chicago by Alice Sinkevitch (2004). St. John Cantius is found in a number of books on church architecture, among them Heavenly City: The Architectural Tradition of Catholic Chicago by Denis R. McNamara (2005), Chicago Churches and Synagogues: An Architectural Pilgrimage by George A. Lane (1982), Chicago Churches: A Photographic Essay by Elizabeth Johnson (1999), and The Archdiocese of Chicago: A Journey of Faith by Edward R. Kantowicz (2007).

== See also ==
- Polish Cathedral style
- Poles in Chicago
- Adolphus Druiding
- Tadeusz Żukotyński
