= Kilgen =

American organ builder

Kilgen was a prominent American builder of organs which was in business from the mid-19th to the mid-20th century.

== History ==
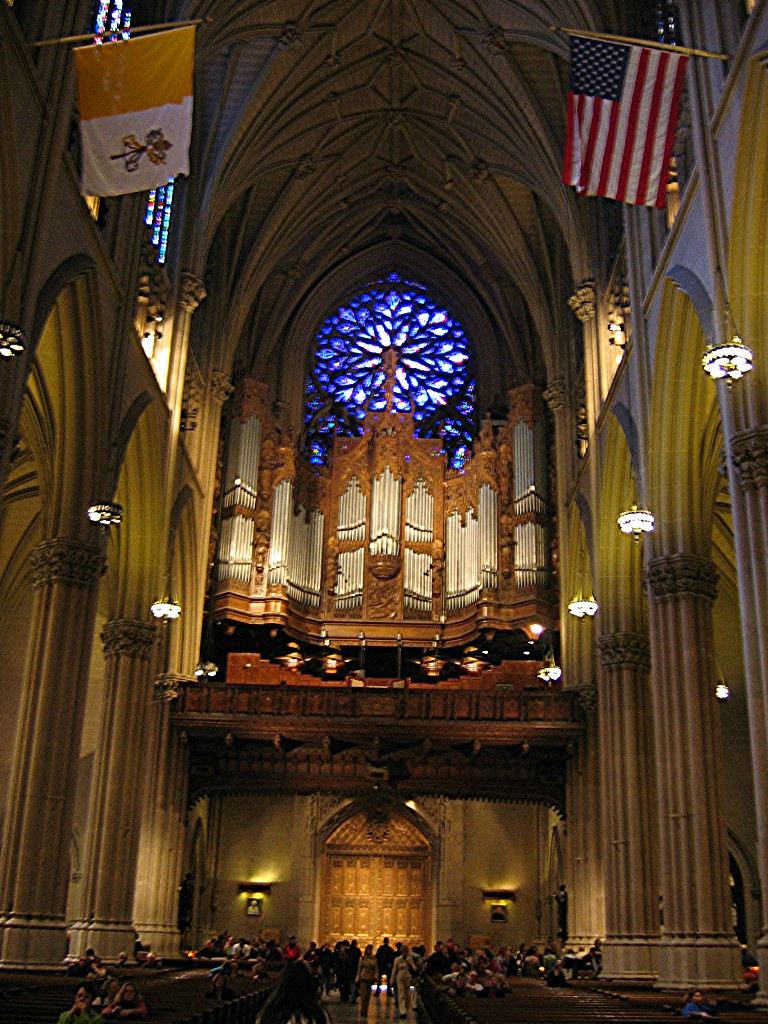
The grand gallery organ at St. Patrick's Cathedral, New York

=== The Kilgen family ===
The Kilgen family's history of organ making supposedly dates to the 17th century, when Sebastian Kilgen, a French Huguenot, fled France and took refuge in a German monastery near Durlach. There he learned organ building from the monks, and built his first organ in 1640. Succeeding generations of Kilgens remained in Durlach and carried on organ building as a family trade.

=== George Kilgen and Son ===
George Kilgen was born in Merchingen, Germany in 1821 and apprenticed to the organ builder Louis Voit in Durlach. In 1840, he emigrated to the United States for political reasons and was employed with the Jardine organ company in New York City. He founded his own company there in 1851, and in 1873 relocated to St. Louis, where his company became one of the principal suppliers of church organs to the Midwestern United States.

George Kilgen's son Charles (1859-1932) was made partner in 1885, and the business was renamed George Kilgen and Son. By the turn of the century, Kilgen and Son had grown to be the largest and most well-known organ company in St. Louis. George Kilgen died in 1902, and Charles Kilgen took over the company and headed it during its most productive years. In 1909, Charles Kilgen purchased the Pfeffer Organ Co. and added it to the company's assets. An organ manufactured and installed in 1916 By Geo. Kilgen and son was installed at St. Stephens Episcopal Church in Douglas Arizona. It is a tubular-pneumatic organ and is still in use to this day.

=== The Kilgen Church Organ Company ===
George Kilgen had another son named Henry C. Kilgen (1851-1918). The March 3, 1894 edition of Music Trade Review identified that Charles O. Kilgen, Henry Kilgen and George J. Kilgen organized the Kilgen Church Organ Company in Chicago, Illinois, with capital of $3,700. Up until this time, it appears Henry Kilgen had been operating independently, having established his own firm in St. Louis, Missouri in the early 1870s. Examples of his work can be found in Saint Augustine's Cultural Center (formerly Saint Augustine's Catholic Church) in Austin, Nevada and St. Patrick's Catholic Church (Toledo, Ohio). Henry Kilgen died on July 29, 1918. His death certificate identified him as employed at the time by Kilgen and Son of St. Louis, Missouri.

=== Kilgen Associates/Kilgen Organ Company ===
Following Charles Kilgen's death, disagreements among his four sons led to the dissolution of the Kilgen and Son firm in 1939. Charles' sons George, Charles, and Alfred Kilgen formed Kilgen Associates, which went bankrupt in 1943. His other son, Eugene, formed the Kilgen Organ Company in St. Louis, with Max Hess as his vice-president and chief engineer. In 1944 it consolidated all of its operations (which had been spread across multiple buildings) into a single new factory building on West Florissant Avenue. At the time it was engaged in producing aircraft components for the war effort. The Kilgen Organ Company built some notable organs prior to closing its doors in 1960 due to financial difficulties and labor disputes.

== Organs ==
During the company's early years, Kilgen primarily built and installed tracker action pipe organs for small churches in the Midwest. By 1924, over four thousand Kilgen organs had been installed, many of which remain in use today. Some large Kilgen organs were built during this period as well, including the one in the Cathedral of San Fernando in San Antonio, Texas and that installed in recent years in the chapel of Ste. Anne de Detroit Catholic Church. Later, the company produced greater numbers of large organs, including the chancel and grand gallery organs at St. Patrick's Cathedral, New York and over 190 theatre organs.
