= Canons Regular of St. John Cantius =

Catholic religious institute

Canons Regular of Saint John Cantius
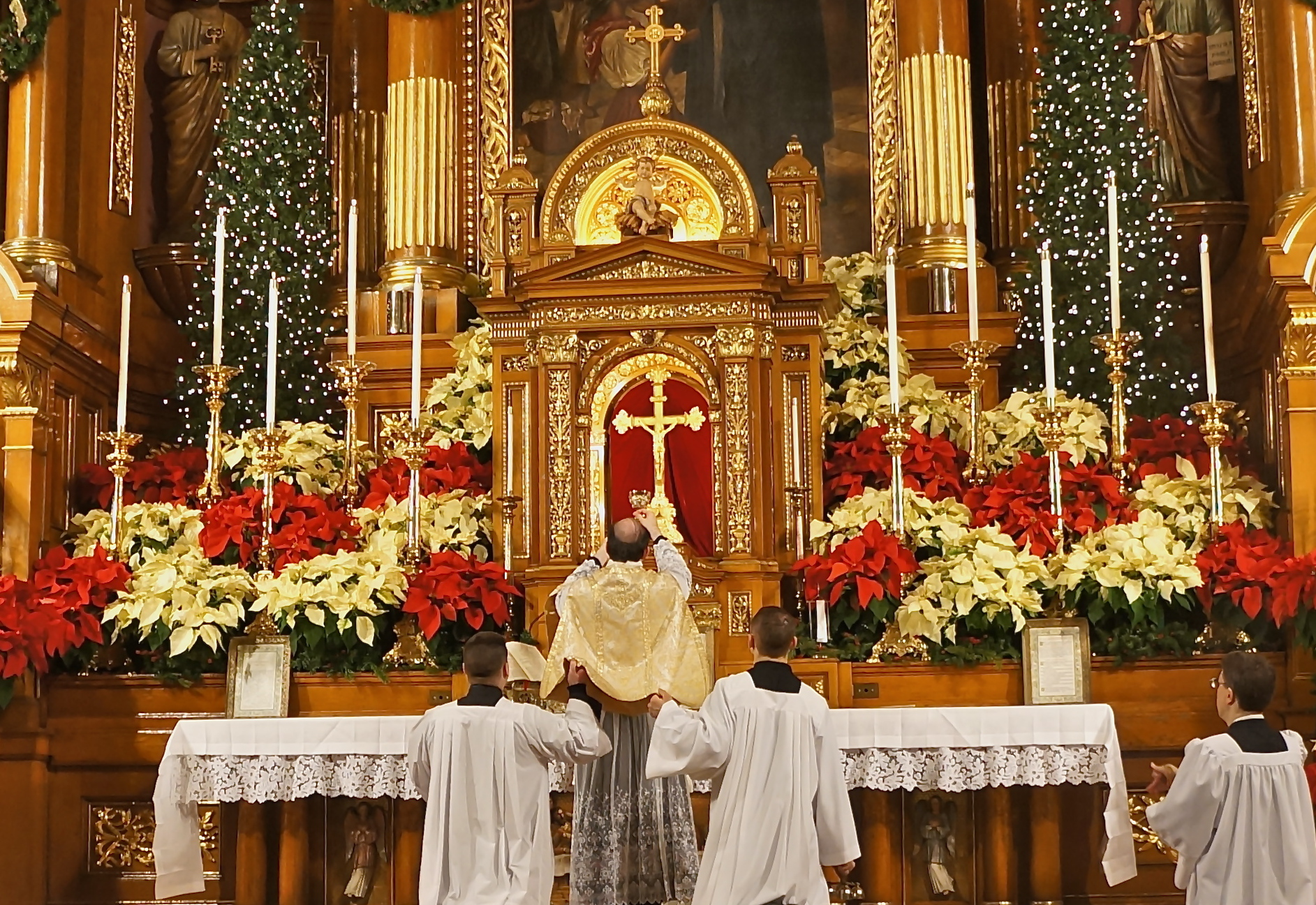
- Abbreviation: SJC
- Formation: 1998; 28 years ago
- Founder: Fr. Frank Phillips, C.R.
- Founded at: Chicago
- Purpose: To Restore the Sacred (Latin: Instaurare Sacra)
- Superior General: Fr. Joshua Caswell, SJC
- Parent organization: Roman Catholic Archdiocese of Chicago
- Website: Official website

The Canons Regular of St. John Cantius is a religious institute founded in 1998 at St. John Cantius Church in Chicago. They are devoted to the reverent celebration of the Catholic Mass, in both the Tridentine and the Novus Ordo Missae

== History ==
In August 1988, Fr. Frank Phillips, a member of the Resurrectionist Congregation, arrived as pastor at the Polish St. John Cantius Church in Chicago. Phillips began to reinvigorate the parish through paying special attention and dedication to the liturgical and musical traditions of the Latin Rite of the Catholic Church. In 1998, with the blessing of the Resurrectionists and Cardinal Francis George, Phillips founded the Canons Regular of St. John Cantius. They were formally established as a public association of the faithful in 1999. It was the first men's religious community to be started in the Archdiocese of Chicago.

As canons regular, members of the institute follow the rule of St. Augustine and take vows of poverty, chastity, and obedience. Members are incardinated priests of the Roman Catholic Archdiocese of Chicago.

In 2014, at the invitation of Bishop Thomas Paprocki, the canons were given pastoral care of Sacred Heart Church in the Roman Catholic Diocese of Springfield. They also staff St. Peter Parish in Volo, Illinois in the Chicago archdiocese, and a chapel in Michigan.

In 2015, the group had 15 priests. The Canons Regular have trained an estimated 2,000 priests in the celebration of the Tridentine Mass. Prior to the founding of the canons, only some 30 individuals attended Mass each weekend; however, by 2008, there were 3,200 families registered.

Fr. Phillips was removed from ministry in 2018 after an accusation of civilly and ecclesiastically non-criminal improper conduct. Fr. Gene Szarek, Phillips' religious superior at the USA district of the Resurrectionist Congregation, recommended that he not return to Cantius as the pastor, but that he be allowed to return to ministry, stating that there was some "ambiguity between the allegations of the accusers and the testimony of witnesses", and recommending that Phillips undergo sensitivity training. At the request of Cardinal Cupich, Phillips relocated to St. Louis and has no contact with members of the Canons.

== Mission ==
Their charism and motto is To Restore the Sacred (Latin: Instaurare Sacra). The Canons celebrate both the Tridentine Mass and the Mass of Paul VI in Latin.

=== Traditionis custodes ===
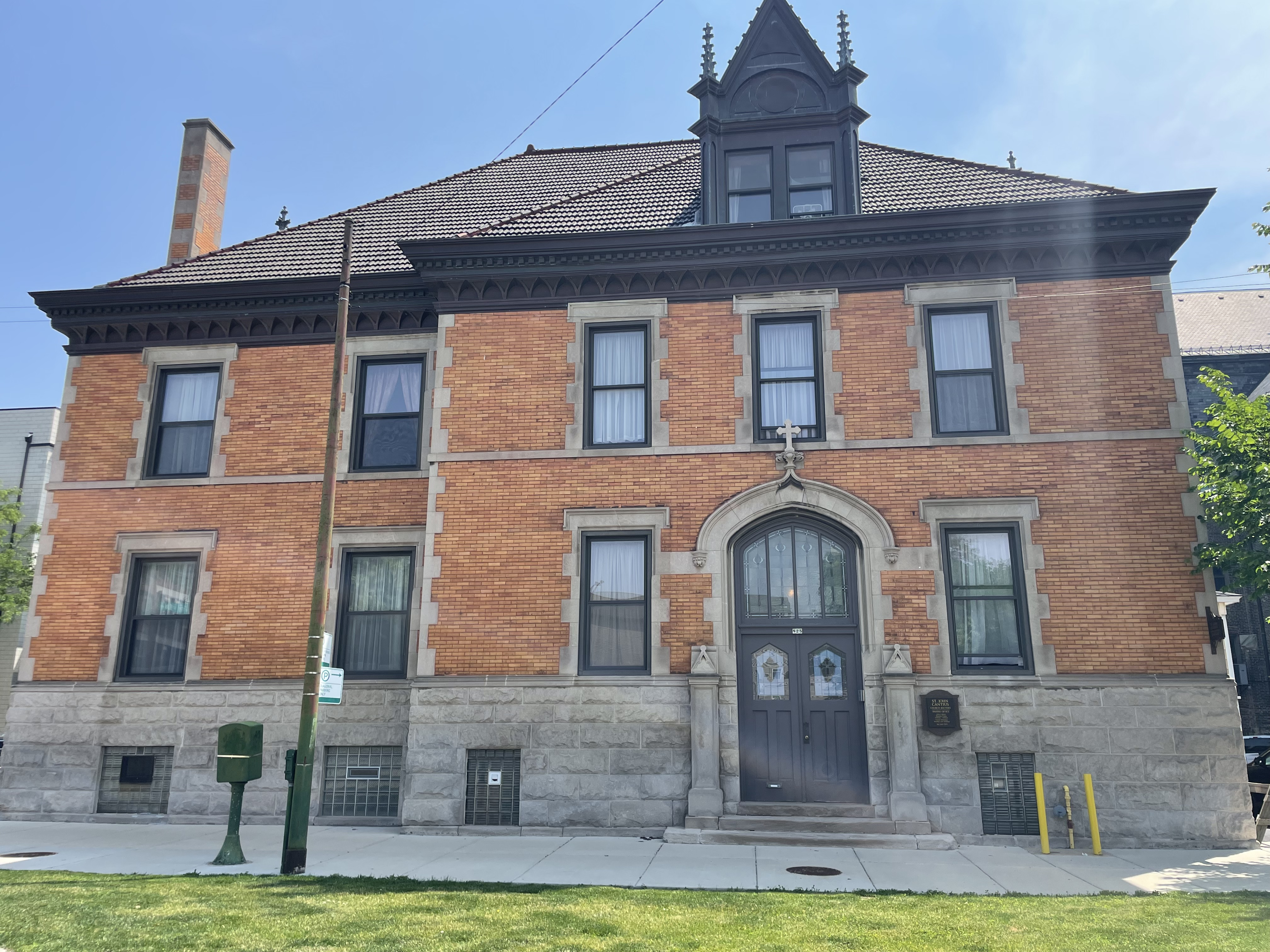
The rectory of St. John Cantius in Chicago, a residence of the Canons.

The issuance of Pope Francis's document Traditionis custodes drew into question the future of the Canons Regular. Cardinal Blase Cupich authorized the continued celebration of the Tridentine Mass, but prohibited its celebration on the first Sunday of each month, Christmas, the Paschal Triduum, and Pentecost Sunday. This restriction includes those canons of the community who serve in the Diocese of Springfield.
