= St. John Nepomuk Parish Historic District =

Historic church in Missouri, United States

- St. John Nepomuk Parish; Historic District
- U.S. National Register of Historic Places
- U.S. Historic district
- St. Louis Landmark
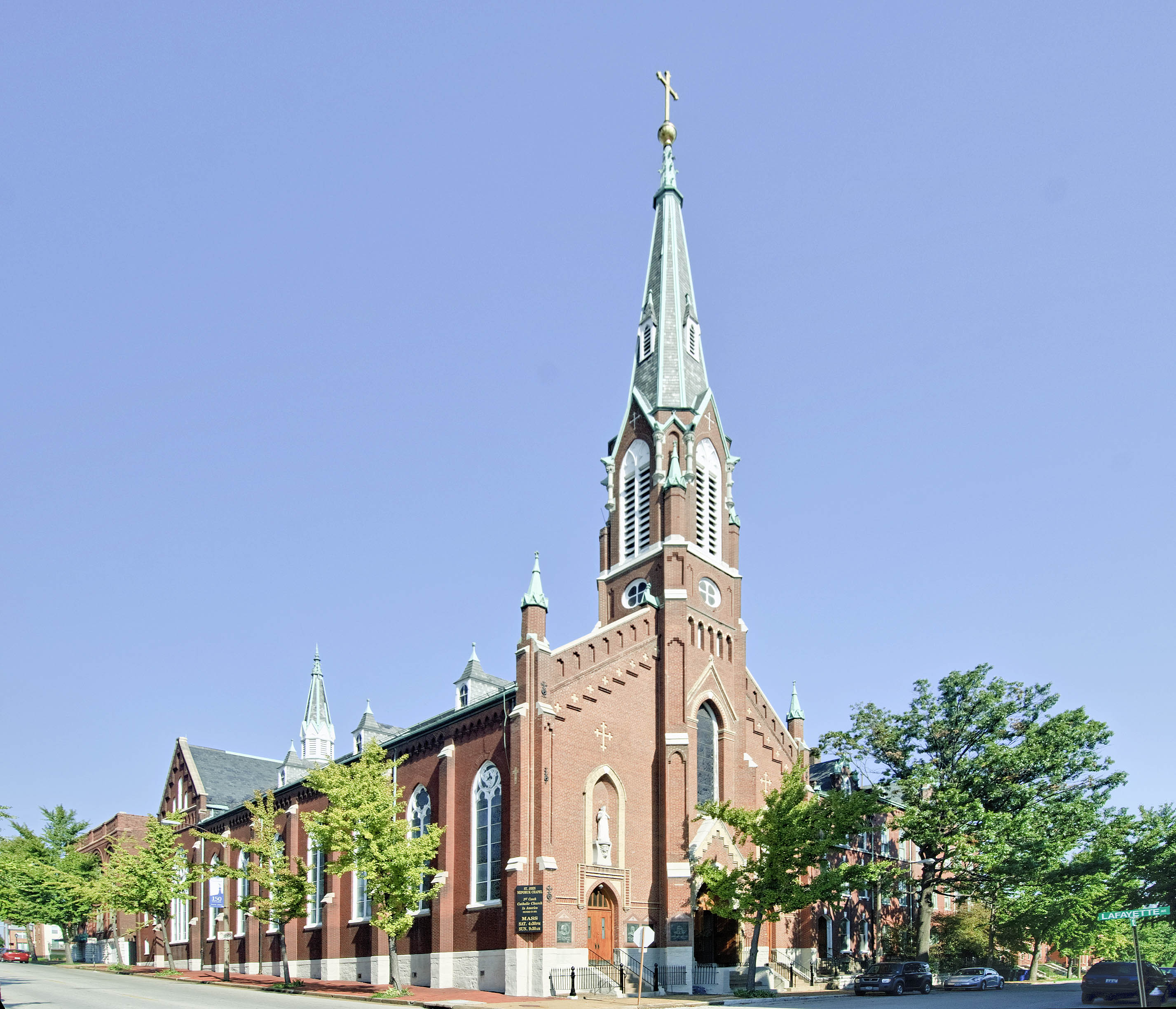
- St. John Nepomuk Church in 2012

- Location within St. Louis Location within Missouri Location within the United States
- Location: 11th and 12th Sts. between Carroll St. and Lafayette Ave. St. Louis, Missouri
- Coordinates: 38°36′45″N 90°12′17″W
- Built: 1887
- Architect: Adolphus Druiding
- Architectural style: Gothic Revival
- MPS: LaSalle Park MRA
- NRHP reference No.: 72001558

Significant dates
- Added to NRHP: June 19, 1972
- Designated STLL: 1971

St. John Nepomuk Parish Historic District is centered on the Catholic parish of St. John Nepomuk in the Soulard neighborhood of St. Louis, Missouri, United States. The historic district is listed on the National Register of Historic Places.

== History ==
St. John Nepomuk was established as a national Bohemian parish in 1854. It was the first such parish founded in the United States. At one time a Czech language newspaper was published in one of the parish buildings. As the parish grew new church buildings were built in 1873 and 1887. The present church, however, is largely an 1897 reconstruction. The building had been largely damaged in a tornado the previous year. The parish school, which sits across Eleventh Street from the church, was begun in 1869. It was staffed by the School Sisters of Notre Dame. In 1971 the church building and six ancillary buildings were designated a City Landmark in St. Louis and they were listed as an historic district on the National Register of Historic Places in 1972. The parish was closed in 2005, but the church building has remained active as a chapel.

== Architecture ==
Chicago architect Adolphus Druiding designed the Gothic Revival-style church. He is known for the many Catholic churches, schools, rectories and convents that he designed, especially in the Midwestern United States. The exterior of the church is composed of brick, which blends in with the other buildings on Soulard.
