= St. Mary's Catholic Church (Delaware, Ohio) =

Historic church in Ohio, United States

- St. Mary's Church and Rectory
- U.S. National Register of Historic Places
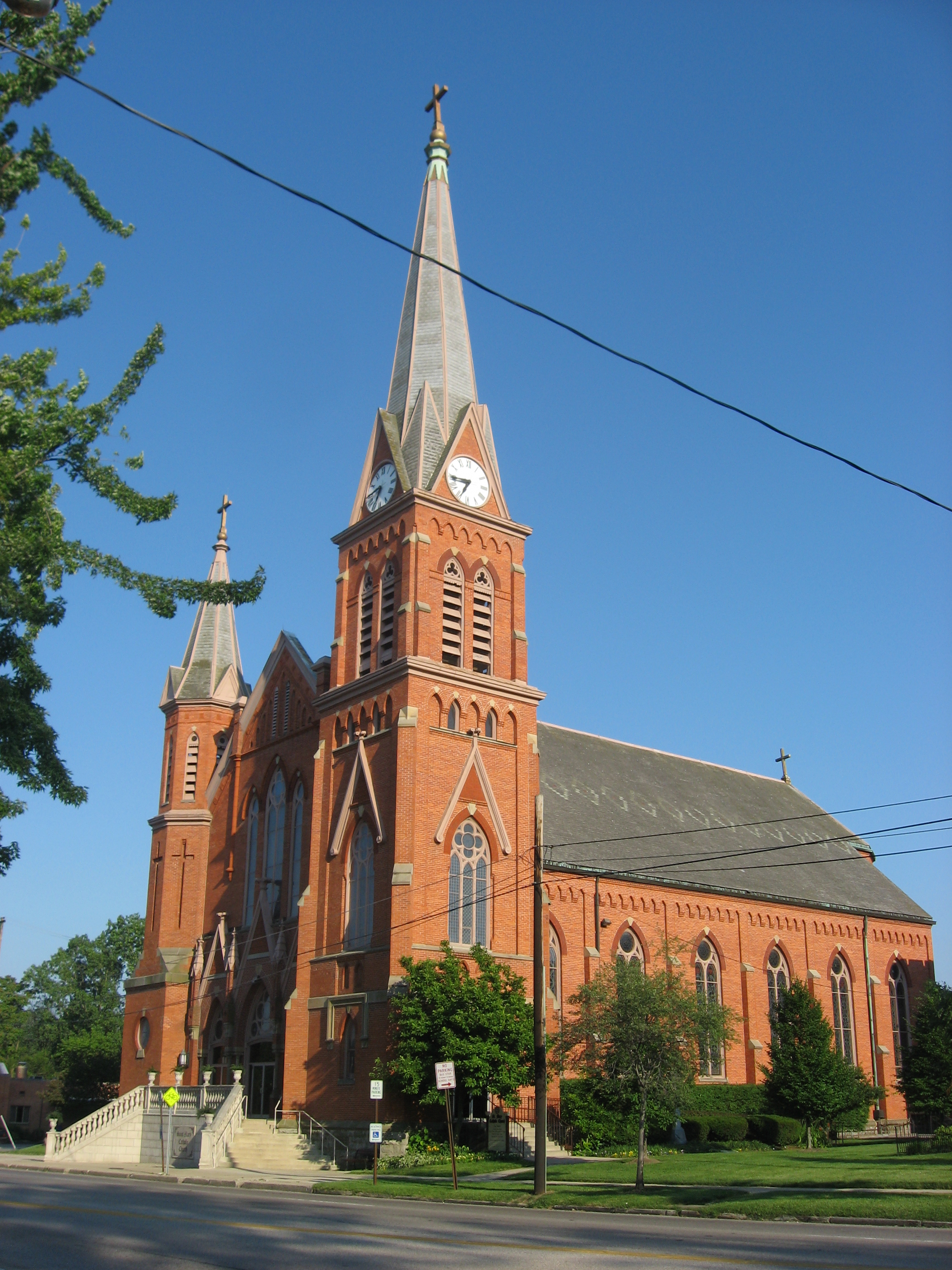
- Front and side of the church

- Location within Ohio Location within the United States
- Location: 82 E. William St., Delaware, Ohio
- Coordinates: 40°17′54″N 83°3′53″W
- Area: Less than 1 acre (0.40 ha)
- Built: 1886
- Architect: Adolphus Druiding; Bourner & Phillips
- Architectural style: Gothic Revival
- NRHP reference No.: 80002994
- Added to NRHP: May 23, 1980

St. Mary's Catholic Church is a historic Catholic parish church in the city of Delaware, Ohio, United States. Constructed in the 1880s, this grand building is home to a congregation established in the middle of the nineteenth century. Its grand style has long made it a community landmark, and it was named a historic landmark in 1980.

== Parish history ==
Delaware's first Masses were celebrated by travelling priests in the homes of the city's few Catholics, most of whom were Irish or German immigrants. The first of these was likely said in 1835 by a French missionary priest in the home of Adam Mueller on Park Avenue. The members built the first St. Mary's Church, a small plain frame building that was a mission church of Holy Cross Church in 1854, and were ministered to by traveling priests including future bishops Caspar Borgess and Edward Fitzgerald.

However, six years passed before Archbishop Purcell appointed the first priest to serve as the pastor on December 1, 1856. This man, Casper Wiese, quickly founded a parish school and bought a piece of land for use as a parish cemetery. A series of short-tenured pastorates followed Wiese's four-year time; the longest, that of Henry Fehlings, ended during the process of regional reorganization following the creation of the Diocese of Columbus. Fehlings' pastorate saw the parish expand outward from its small frame building: a brick addition to the church was constructed in 1865, a nearby store was purchased and converted into premises for the parish school, and a nearby house was purchased and converted into a rectory. By 1880, the parish had reached a membership of approximately seven hundred. In 1886, the present house of worship, made of brick trimmed with sandstone and ornamental terra-cotta began to be constructed on William Street near downtown. The cornerstone was laid in 1887 and the church was solemnly blessed by bishop John Watterson in October 1888.

Today, St. Mary's remains an active component of the Diocese of Columbus. It is one of three parishes in Delaware County, along with St. Joan of Arc in Powell and St. John Neumann in Sunbury.

== Architecture ==
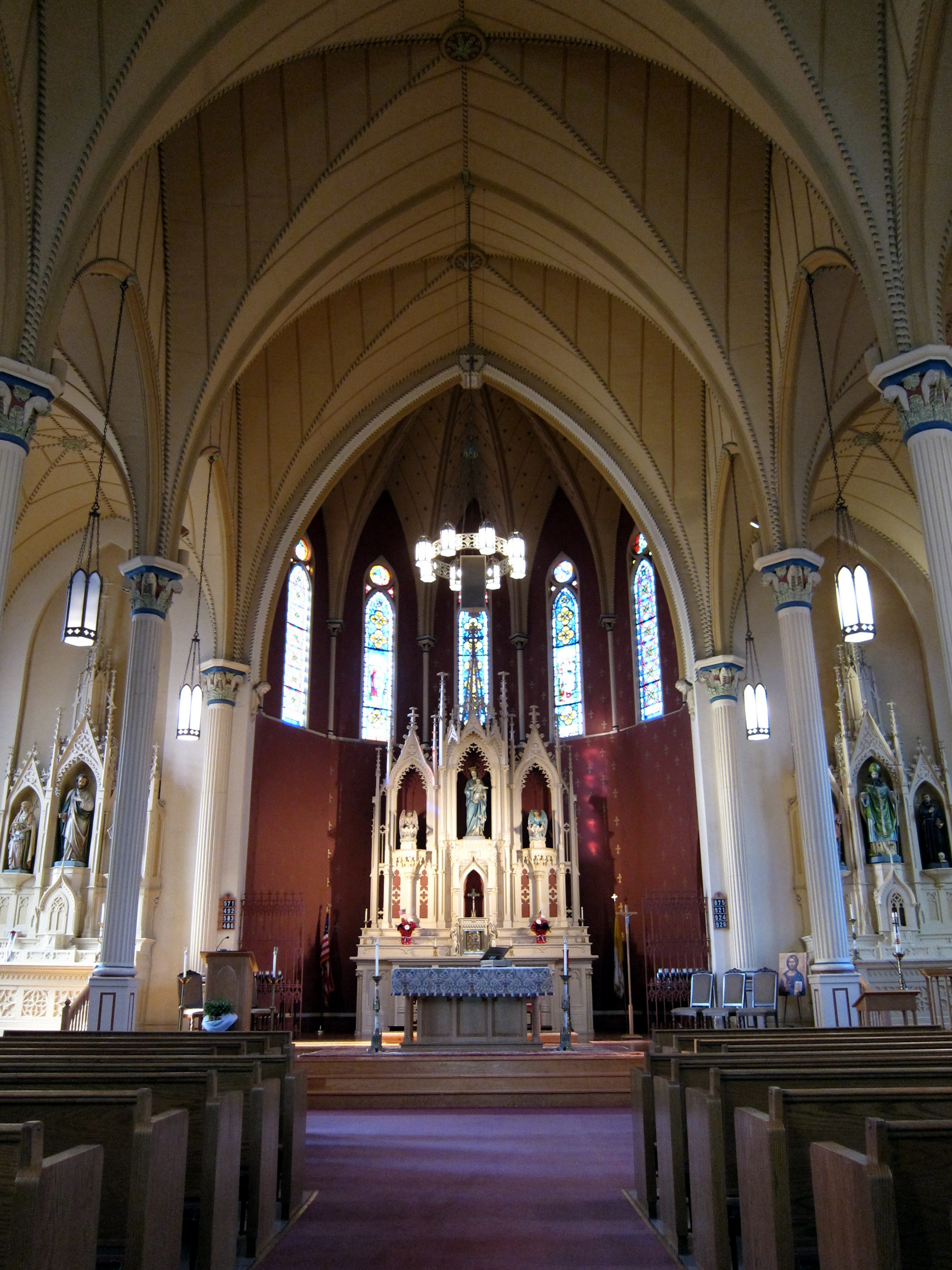
The church nave.

St. Mary's is a brick structure supported on a foundation of limestone and covered with a slate roof. Designed by Adolphus Druiding, the building is a Gothic Revival structure dominated by a pair of towers on the facade. The towers sit on either side of the gabled main portion of the building; the tower on the right, as seen by a person facing the building, is substantially taller than the tower on the left. Six ogive windows pierce the side, one per bay, while individual and paired windows are placed on various heights in the towers; clocks are set in the taller tower, and both are topped with tall spires that can be seen throughout Delaware. Extensive and ornate detailing is present, including numerous wood carvings, elaborate stained glass in the windows, and decorative placement of bricks. Inside, columns separate the nave from the side aisles, and the two altars are built of wood that has been both painted and carven. The extensive artisanship of the church makes it differ greatly from the rectory; although three stories tall and built of brick, it is far plainer than the church.

== Historic site ==
In 1980, St. Mary's Church and its rectory were listed together on the National Register of Historic Places, qualifying because of their historically significant architecture. They together comprise one of seventeen National Register-listed locations in the city of Delaware, along with places such as the Delaware County Courthouse downtown and Selby Field on the Ohio Wesleyan University campus.
