= Shrine of St. Joseph, St. Louis =

Historic church in Missouri, United States

- Shrine of Saint Joseph
- U.S. National Register of Historic Places
- St. Louis Landmark
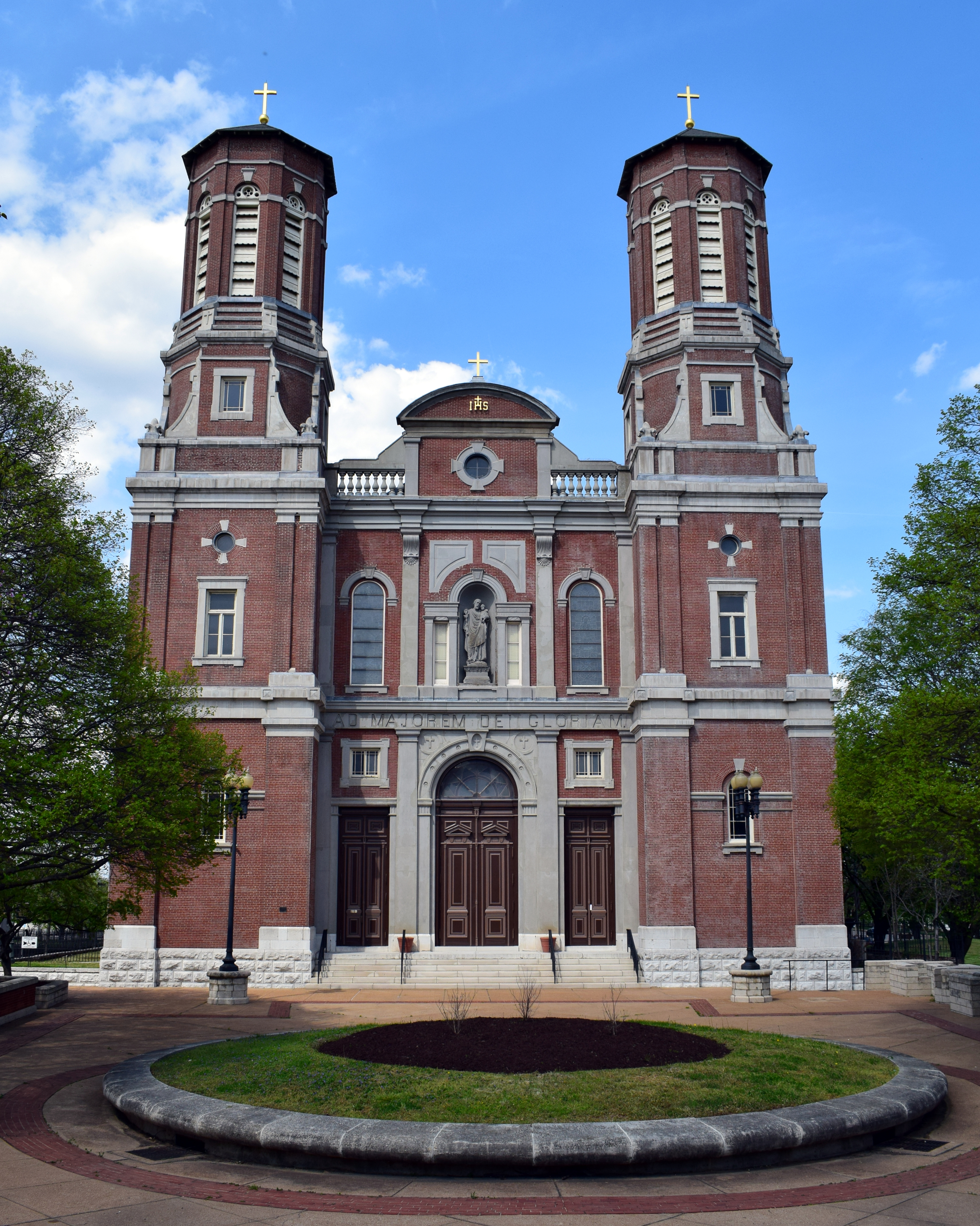
- Shrine of St. Joseph St. Louis, Missouri

- Location within St. Louis Location within Missouri Location within the United States
- Location: 1220 North 11th Street, St. Louis, Missouri
- Coordinates: 38°38′14.15″N 90°11′33.45″W
- Built: 1844
- Architect: George Purvis
- NRHP reference No.: 78003396
- Added to NRHP: 1978

The Shrine of St. Joseph is a Catholic church in St. Louis, Missouri in Columbus Square. The church began in 1843 when the Jesuits founded the parish to serve the residential community consisting mostly of German immigrants. The church is the site of the only authenticated miracle in the Midwestern United States.

== History ==
=== 1846–1866 ===
After founding the parish in 1843, the Jesuits immediately instituted to build a church. Mrs. Ann Biddle a wealthy widow, known for her many philanthropic deeds, donated the land for the new church. The cornerstone for the new church was blessed by Bishop Kenrick on April 14, 1844. The completed building was a modest building which faced west toward 11th Street and was dedicated on the first Sunday in August, 1846 with Father James Van de Velde, later Bishop of Chicago, officiating.

Soon St. Joseph parish was a very active community. In 1862 a large parish school was built nearby, to care for the many children of the area. The School Sisters of Notre Dame staffed the school.

The church is associated with the sudden recovery of Ignatius Strecker, a man with a severe chest injury, in 1864. This event was formally declared an authentic miracle by the Holy See, and was used to fulfill the requirements for canonization of Peter Claver, whom Strecker had invoked just prior to his recovery.

=== 1866–1880 ===
Just at this time a Jesuit missionary, Father Francis Xavier Weninger, came to St. Joseph's to preach.

Over the years the parish grew, it became obvious that the original church was no longer large enough to serve the congregation. It was decided to build a large addition to the old building and to revise the structure so that the entrance faced Biddle Street. Bishop Kenrick laid the cornerstone for this second St. Joseph in 1865.

Bueschers of Chicago, famous for their religious art work, were employed to carve an elaborate altar, which is designed as a replica of the Altar of St. Ignatius in the Jesuit Gesu Church in Rome, except that the figure of St. Joseph and the Christ Child are substituted for the figure of St. Ignatius. Beneath the central figures appear the words: "Ite ad Joseph", Go to Joseph.

Known as "The Altar of Answered Prayers" because of its origin, this beautiful work can still be seen at St. Joseph's Shrine, where it serves as the central altar. It was installed early in 1867, at a total cost of $6,131. The grateful parishioners raised the additional funds above their original pledge in recognition of their deliverance from the cholera epidemic.

The primary remodeling was completed in 1866. Father Pierre Jean De Smet, noted missionary to the Indians, officiated at the dedication services on December 30, 1866.

=== 1880–1954 ===
In 1880 the church was once again enlarged and remodeled. This work, which included the addition of an elaborate Romanesque face and twin towers surmounted with delicate cupolas, was completed in 1881.

Further alterations had to be made in 1954, under the supervision of the shrine's pastor, Father Anthony Corey. At this time, for reasons of safety, the beautiful original towers were shortened, and the cupolas replaced by heavier, hexagonal caps, thus considerably altering the exterior of the building, and detracting from its former beauty. This was after the Jesuits left the parish and was staffed by priest of the Archdiocese.

While owned by the Archdiocese of St. Louis the now Shrine of St. Joseph is leased to The Friends of The Shrine of St. Joseph, Inc. a not for profit 501(c)(3) corporation. All donations are tax deductible to the extent allowable by law.

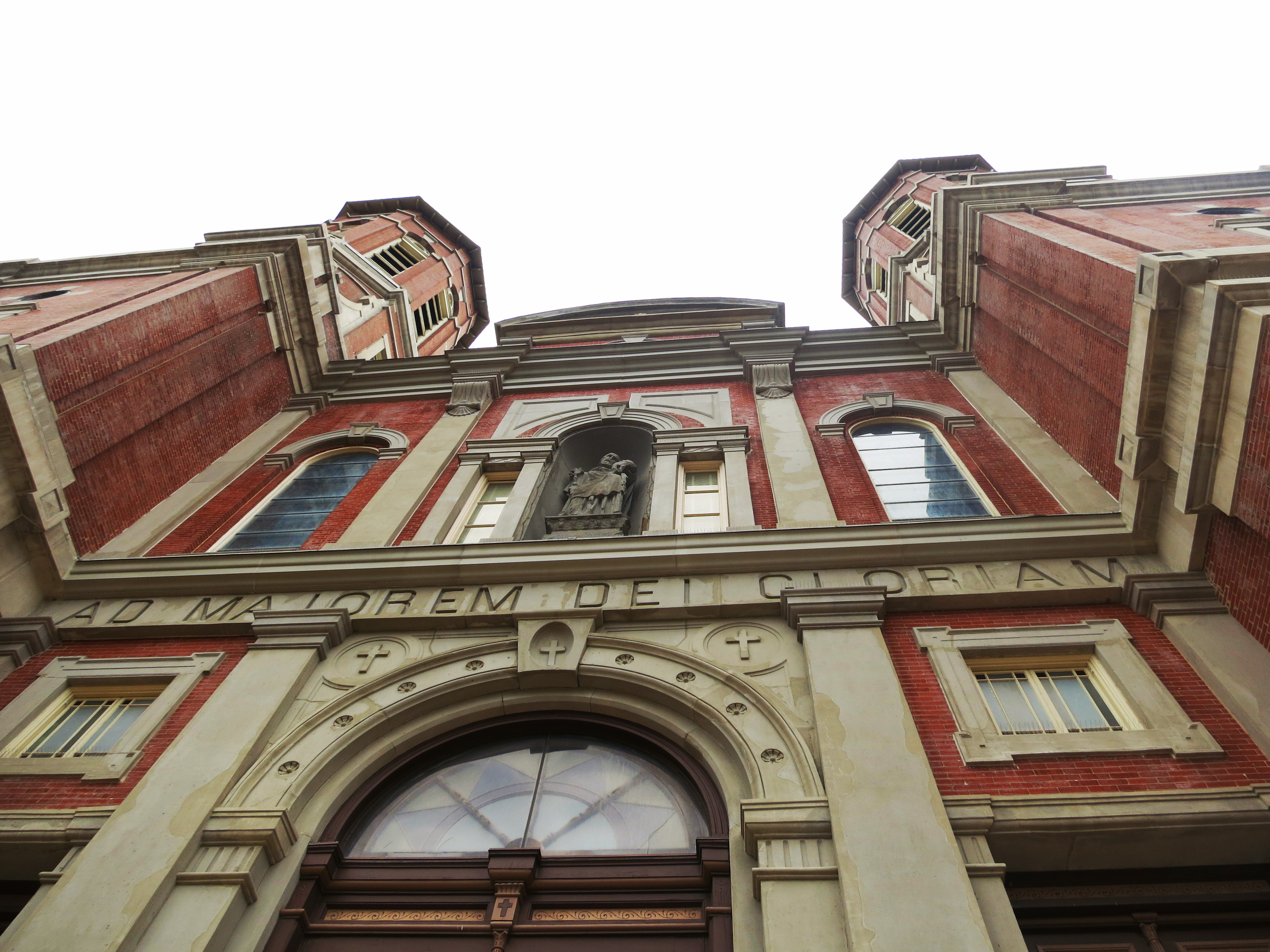
Shrine of St. Joseph entrance in 2012.

== Gallery ==
National Register of Historic Places

Inside the Shrine from the balcony

Ambo

Baptismal Font

Statue of Saint Peter Claver

Stained Glass window on the side of the Shrine

Woman praying before the Altar of Answered Prayers

Celebrating Mass at the Shrine, 1924

== See also ==
- List of Jesuit sites
