= St. Francis Xavier College Church =

Historic church in Missouri, United States

- U.S. Historic district – Contributing property
- St. Louis Landmark
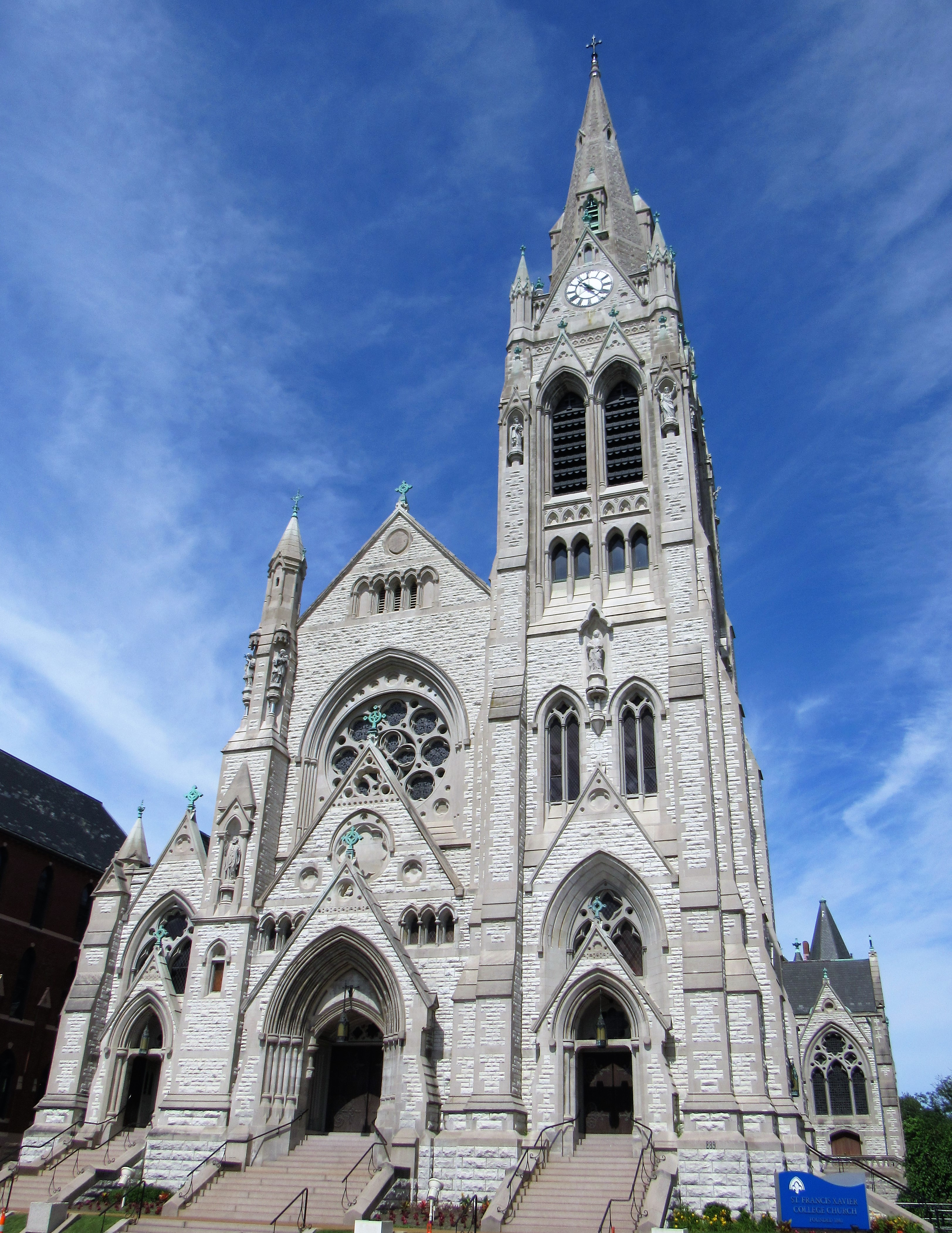
- The College Church in 2018

- Location within St. Louis Location within Missouri Location within the United States
- Location: Lindell and N. Grand Blvds., St. Louis, Missouri
- Coordinates: 38°38′13″N 90°13′59″W
- Area: less than one acre
- Built: 1884-1898
- Architect: Thomas Walsh; Henry Switzer
- Architectural style: Gothic Revival
- Part of: Midtown Historic District (St. Louis) (ID78003392)

Significant dates
- Added to NRHP: July 7, 1978
- Designated STLL: 1976

St. Francis Xavier College Church is a Catholic church in the Midtown neighborhood of St. Louis, Missouri, United States. The church was built by the Society of Jesus in 1836: the current building dates from 1884. It serves as a parish church in the Archdiocese of St. Louis and for the Saint Louis University community. It is a contributing property in the Midtown Historic District on the National Register of Historic Places and it is listed as a City Landmark in St. Louis.

== History ==
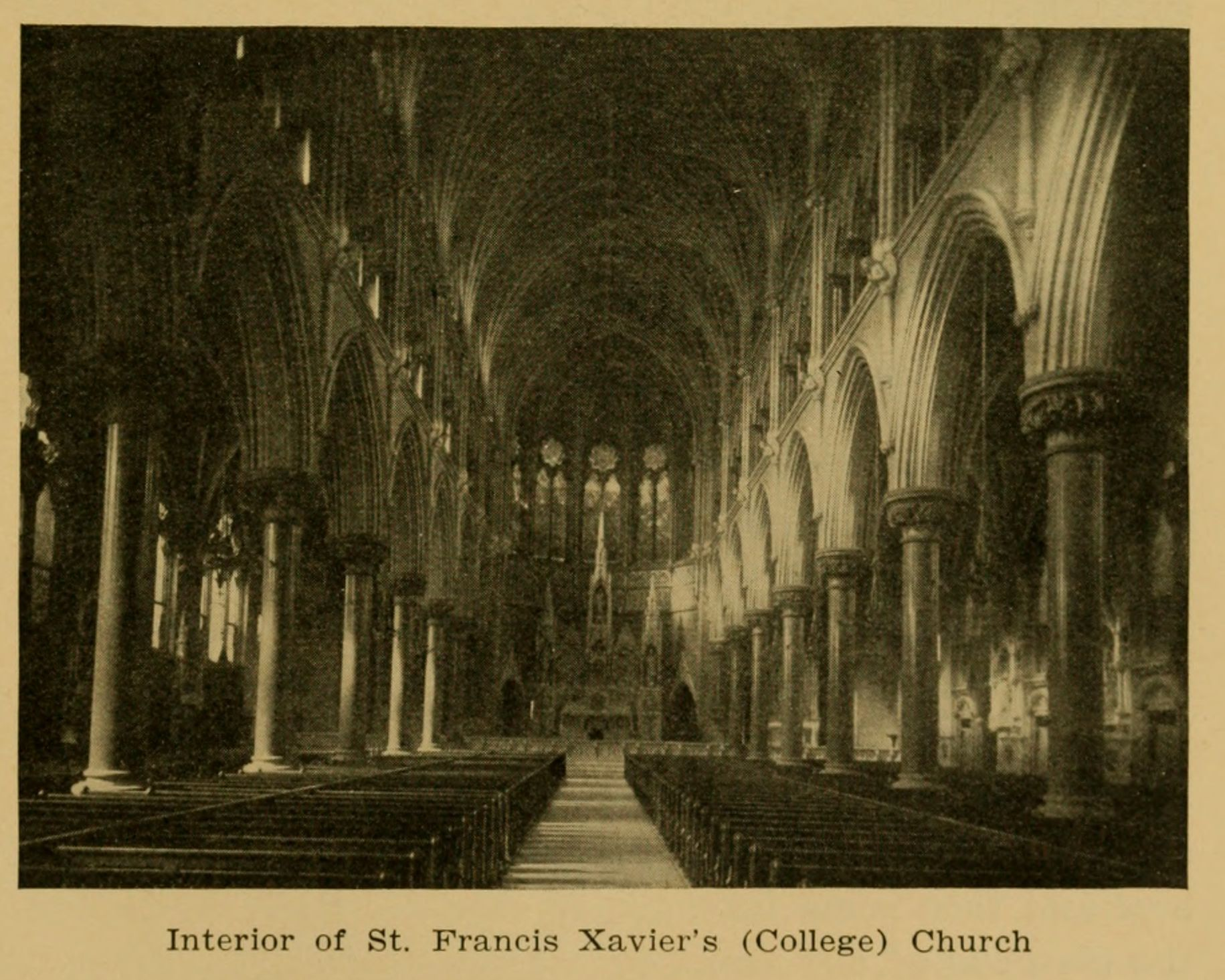
Interior of the church in 1910

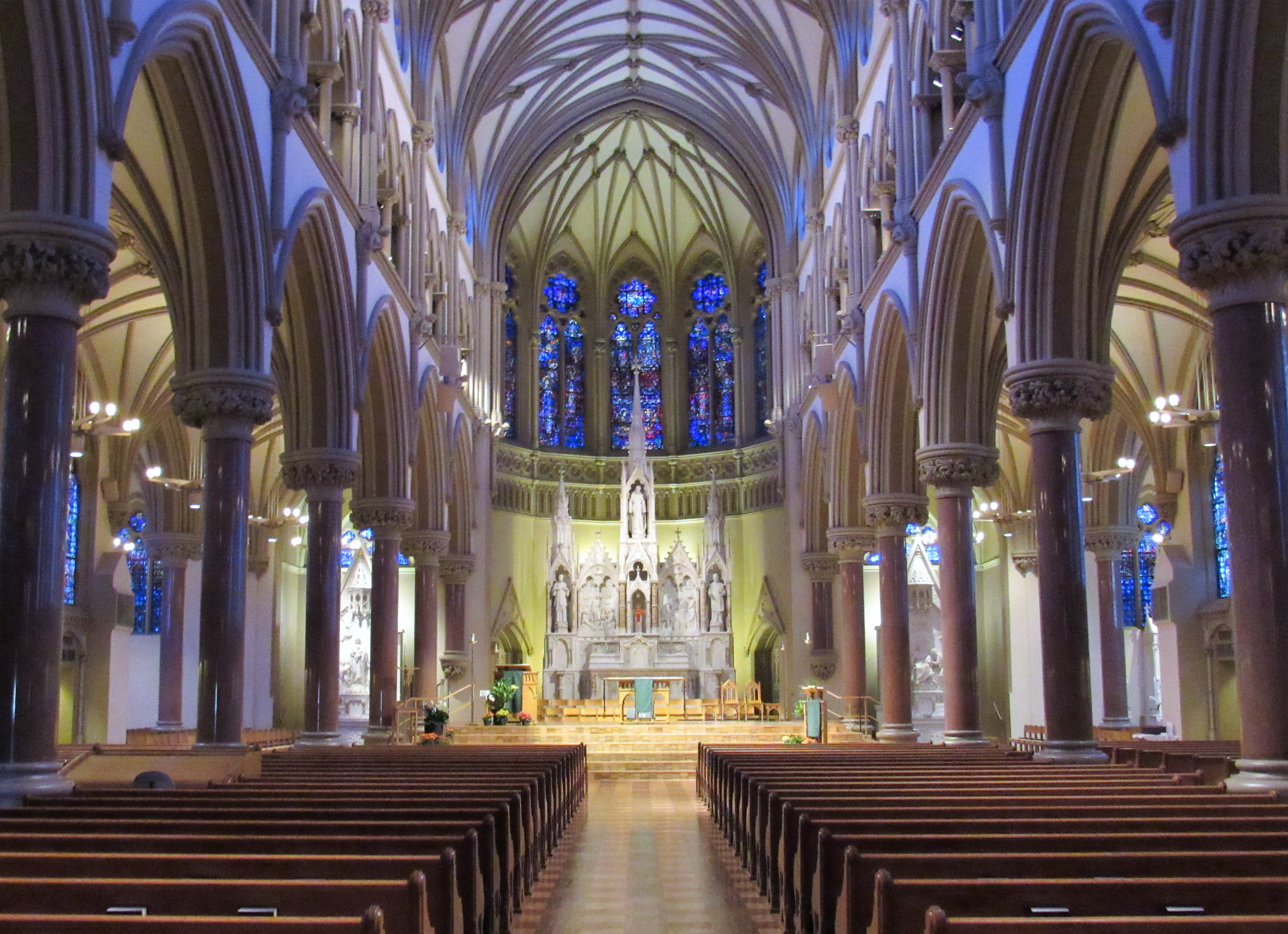
Interior of the church today

The parish was established in 1836 when St. Louis Bishop Joseph Rosati, C.M. permitted the Jesuits to establish a parish at their college. It was St. Louis' first English-speaking parish. The congregation initially met in the college's student chapel, which was dedicated to St. Aloysius Gonzaga. The chapel was located on Washington Avenue between Ninth and Tenth Streets. As the parish grew, plans for its own building were begun. The cornerstone for the first church was laid on April 12, 1840, by Bishop Rosati. It was located at the intersection of Ninth Street and Christy (Lucas) Avenue. While from its beginning the church was dedicated to St. Francis Xavier it has always been popularly called the College Church.

Saint Louis University moved to its present location on Grand Boulevard in 1867. Archbishop Peter Richard Kenrick gave permission in 1879 for the College Church to move to the new campus. Plans for the current church were drawn up by St. Louis architect Thomas Walsh. He had previously designed DuBourg Hall, which served as the only university building for several years. Excavation for the new church began on June 8, 1884, and the cornerstone was laid by Coadjutor Archbishop Patrick J. Ryan. He was assisted by Bishops William H. Gross, C.Ss.R. of Savannah and Joseph Dwenger, C.Pp.S. of Fort Wayne. By the end of the year, the lower church was completed and a roof built over it. It served the parish as its church until the upper church was completed.

The upper church was built as finances allowed. The original architect, Walsh, died before it could be built. Henry C. Bronsgeest, S.J., the parish pastor, hired Chicago architect Henry Switzer to complete the church. Bronsgeest had the upper church modeled after St. Colman's Cathedral in Cobh, Ireland. The church was completed in 1898, with the exception of the spire on top of the tower. It was completed in 1914 and bells were placed in the tower at the same time. The windows were created by Emil Frei Jr., and they were installed from 1929 to 1938. George and Anna Backer provided the funding for the windows.

The church was listed as a City Landmark in St. Louis in 1976. It was listed on the National Register of Historic Places as a contributing property in the Midtown Historic District in 1978. A major renovation of the church was completed in 1990.

== See also ==
- List of Jesuit sites
