= Powell Hall =

Concert hall, former theater and movie theater in St. Louis, Missouri

Coordinates: 38.64024°N 90.230059°W

- St. Louis Theatre (1925-68); Powell Symphony Hall (1968-2001)
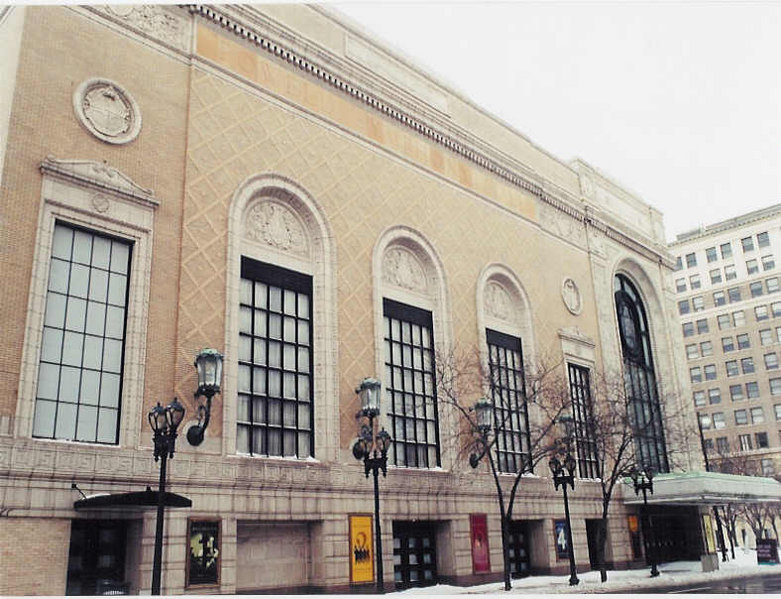
- Exterior of venue (c.1966)
- Address: 718 N Grand Blvd; St. Louis, MO 63103-1011
- Location: Grand Center
- Owner: St. Louis Symphony
- Capacity: 2,150
- Type: Concert hall
- Public transit: MetroBus

Construction
- Opened: November 25, 1925
- Renovated: 1967-68
- Closed: 1966-68
- Reopened: January 24, 1968
- Architect: Rapp & Rapp
- Powell Hall
- U.S. Historic district – Contributing property
- St. Louis Landmark
- Architectural style: Late Gothic Revival, Gothic, Late Victorian
- Part of: Midtown Historic District (ID78003392)
- Added to NRHP: July 7, 1978

Powell Hall (formerly known as the St. Louis Theater and Powell Symphony Hall) is the home of the St. Louis Symphony. Erected in 1925 as the St. Louis Theatre, the theatre presented live vaudeville and motion pictures. The St. Louis Symphony Society acquired the structure in 1966 and renamed it Powell Symphony Hall after Walter S. Powell, a local St. Louis businessman, whose widow donated $1 million towards the purchase and use of this hall by the symphony. The hall seats 2,158.

The building is a contributing property of the Midtown Historic District on the National Register of Historic Places. Powell Hall is part of the Grand Center Arts District, St. Louis.

== History ==
The building was originally called the St. Louis Theater. It was built in 1925 with 4,100 seats, designed by the Chicago architectural firm of Rapp & Rapp. The theater spent the first 40 years of its existence as a stage for live vaudeville performances as well as motion pictures. The last movie shown in the old theater was The Sound of Music in 1966. At that time, the Symphony Society acquired the building for $500,000, through a gift from Oscar Johnson Jr. After spending an additional $2 million to update and renovate the theater, the hall re-opened in January 1968 as the new home of the St. Louis Symphony Orchestra (SLSO).

Carl Stalling, famous for providing the music to Warner Bros.' Looney Tunes animated series, began his musical career as an organist at the St Louis Theater.

== St. Louis Speakers Series ==
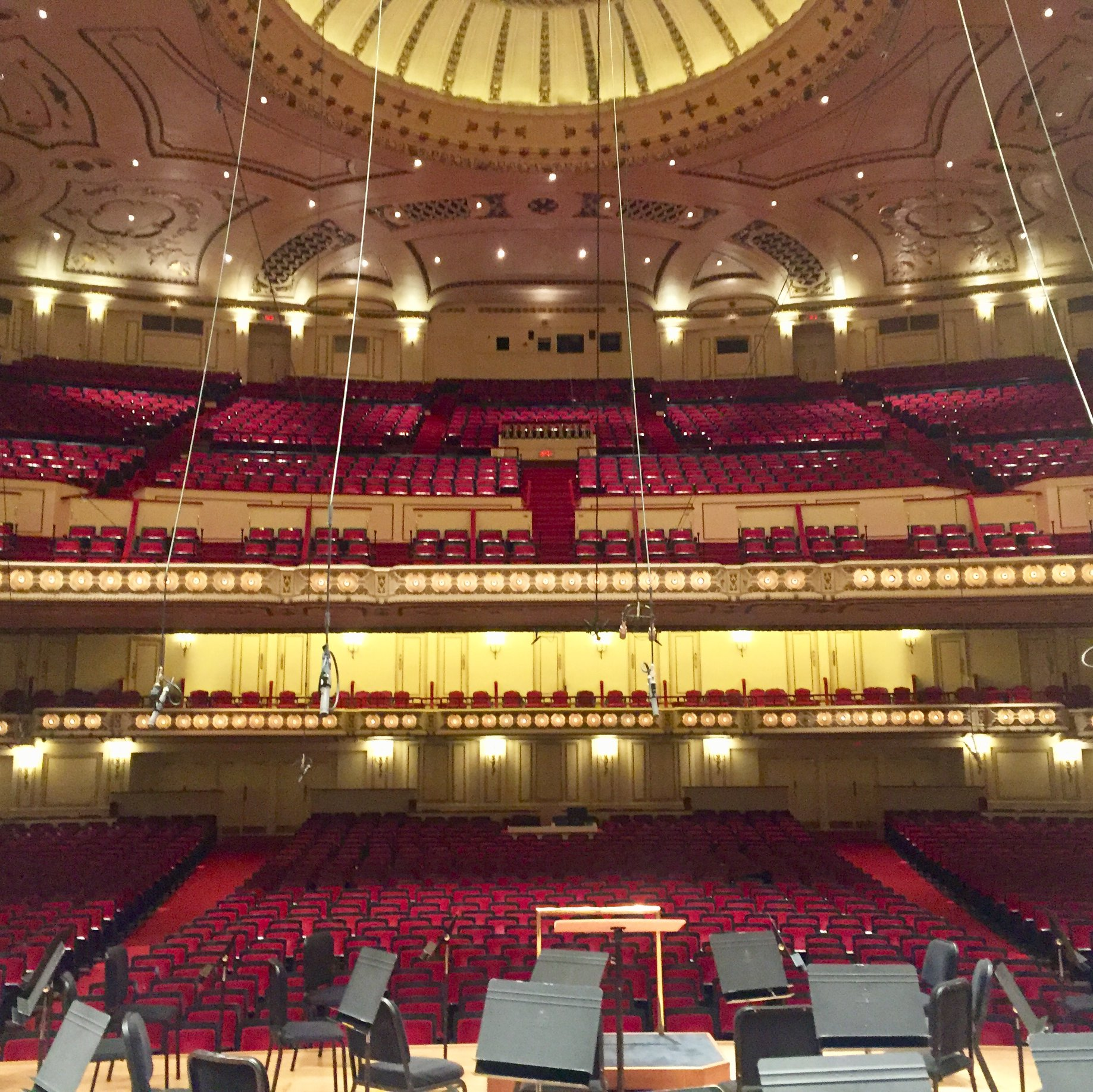
Powell Hall interior in 2019

Since 1998, Powell Hall has been home to the St. Louis Speakers Series, which presents seven events each season, and is available only by full-season subscription.

== 2023 renovations and expansions ==
The St. Louis Symphony announced in January 2023 that Powell Hall would see the start of a major revitalization project that spring, the first since 1968. “We will preserve the history of Powell Hall while creating a state-of-the-art center for community, innovation, and powerful music experiences," SLSO President and CEO Marie-Hélène Bernard said in a statement. The expansion will include: a 3,660-square-foot Education and Learning Center with rehearsal space and a venue for educational programs, receptions, and community gatherings. A three-story lobby with overlooking terraces and enhanced amenities. Significantly more backstage space for artists, with amenities like dressing rooms, a musician lounge, music library, practice spaces, recording studios, and more. New passenger drop-off locations with more accessible entryways. Outdoor green spaces with areas for audiences to gather. While the venue undergoes construction, the SLSO said it will embrace the opportunity to engage new audiences with musical experiences throughout the community. The majority of performances will be at Stifel Theatre, Lindenwood University's J. Scheidegger Center for the Arts, and UMSL's Touhill Performing Arts Center. The revitalized Powell Hall opened in September 2025.

== Jack C. Taylor Music Center ==
SLSO leaders announced on September 18, 2024, that the St. Louis Symphony Orchestra's expansion wing will be named the Jack C. Taylor Music Center. Jack C. Taylor, the late founder of Enterprise Rent-A-Car and a prolific donor to St. Louis arts organizations, made a $40 million contribution to help establish the orchestra's endowment trust in 2000, a donation noted at the time as the largest ever given to an American orchestra. The gift saved the institution "from the brink of bankruptcy,” according to an SLSO statement. Taylor also founded the Crawford Taylor Foundation, which made a $30 million gift to support the Powell Hall renovation and expansion said Marie-Hélène Bernard, the symphony's president and CEO. The Jack C. Taylor Music Center will encompass Powell Hall, plus the 64,000-square-foot expansion including an entrance lobby, education center and backstage wing for performers. The renovation and expansion includes new seats for the concert hall, which will see a reduction in capacity by about 500, though the new capacity of 2,150 will keep the venue in line with those of similarly sized orchestras in the U.S. A 3,400-square-foot extension on space previously occupied by a parking lot will include room for education programs and lectures, rehearsal space for the St. Louis Symphony Chorus and the St. Louis Symphony IN UNISON Chorus.

== See also ==
- Saint Louis Symphony Orchestra
- Fox Theatre (St. Louis)
- List of concert halls
