= List of landmarks of St. Louis =

Local landmark designation in Missouri, US

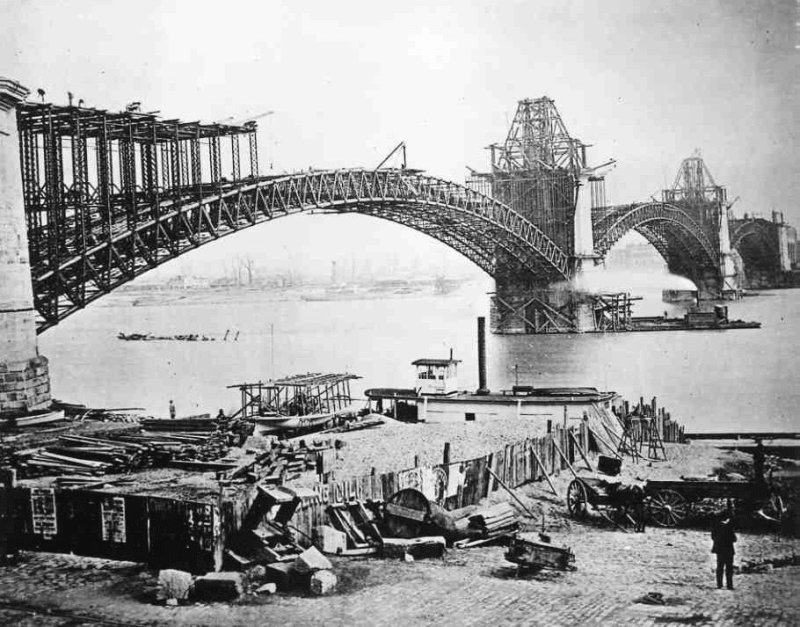
View of the Eads Bridge under construction in 1870, listed as a St. Louis Landmark and National Historic Landmark

St. Louis Landmark is a designation of the Board of Aldermen of the City of St. Louis for historic buildings and other sites in St. Louis, Missouri. Listed sites are selected after meeting a combination of criteria, such as whether the site is a cultural resource, near a cultural resource, or contributes in aggregate to the city as a cultural resource. Once a site is designated as a landmark, it is subject to the St. Louis Preservation Board, which requires that any alterations beyond routine maintenance, up to and including demolition, must have permits that are reviewed by the Board. Many St. Louis Landmarks are also listed on the National Register of Historic Places, providing federal tax support for preservation, and some are further designated National Historic Landmarks, providing additional federal oversight.

== Criteria ==
The Mayor appoints an eight-member Preservation Board to develop recommendations for landmark status in the city, which are then presented to and voted upon by the Board of Aldermen. Recommendations are made based on petitions submitted to the Preservation Board by property owners, city aldermen, or the St. Louis City Cultural Resources Office (on behalf of the Preservation Board itself). The Preservation Board determines if a property is a cultural resource (and therefore is eligible for landmark status) based on whether it

1. Has significant character or value as part of the development, heritage or cultural characteristics of the city, state or nation; or
2. Is the site of a significant historic event; or
3. Is the work of a master whose individual work has significantly influenced the development of the city, state or nation; or
4. Contains elements of design, detail, materials or craftsmanship which represent a significant innovation; or
5. Owing to its unique location or singular physical characteristic represents an established and familiar visual feature of a neighborhood, community or the city; or
6. Has yielded, or is likely to yield, according to the best available scholarship, archaeological artifacts important in prehistory or history.
7. Is a work of art located in a public space.

However, Landmark property owned or controlled by the St. Louis Public Library, the St. Louis City Board of Education, Missouri or the United States government, or formerly owned or controlled by the former Art Museum Board of Control is exempt from the Preservation Board's authority.

== National recognition ==
Several St. Louis Landmarks have been designated with National Historic Landmark status by the United States Secretary of the Interior for historical significance. All of those and a number of other districts, sites, buildings, structures, and objects worthy of preservation have been listed on the National Register of Historic Places. Not all St. Louis Landmarks have been listed on the National Register, and not all sites listed as National Historic Landmarks or listed on the National Register have been listed as St. Louis Landmarks. Additionally, St. Louis is home to Gateway Arch National Park (classed as a National Memorial) and Ulysses S. Grant National Historic Site (classed as a National Historic Site), neither of which are listed as St. Louis Landmarks.

== List of landmarks ==
For consistency, the list below uses the name from the list of current city landmarks on the official St. Louis government website.

St. Louis Landmark	Location	Construction	Demolition	NRHP	NHL	Image
A 19th Century House	911 N. Tucker St. 38°38′05″N 90°11′46″W	c. 1840				Stagger Lee's "Lid" Club
Al's Restaurant	1200 N. 1st St. 38°38′08″N 90°10′57″W	1872				Upload image
Ambassador Theater	411 N. 7th St. 38°37′46″N 90°11′28″W	1926	1996	March 29, 1983		
American Theatre	416 N. 9th St. 38°37′48″N 90°11′34″W	1917		March 18, 1985		photo of Orpheum Theatre, formerly American Theatre
Anheuser-Busch Complex	711 Pestalozzi St. 38°35′55″N 90°12′54″W	1859		November 13, 1966	November 13, 1966	1942 HABS photo
Arcade Building	810 Olive St. 38°37′43″N 90°11′34″W	1919		March 23, 2003		Arcade Building
Art Museum	1 Fine Arts Dr. 38°38′21″N 90°17′40″W	1904				
Ashley Street Power House	Ashley St. and Mississippi River; 38°38′09″N 90°10′53″W	1902				
Bee Hat Company Building	1021 Washington Ave. 38°37′54″N 90°11′41″W	1905		March 24, 1987		
Bethlehem Lutheran Church	2153 Salisbury St. 38°39′33″N 90°12′19″W	1895				
Bevo Mill	4749 Gravois Ave. 38°34′54″N 90°16′01″W	1917		June 3, 2013		
Bissell Mansion	4426 Randall Pl. 38°40′13″N 90°12′12″W	1823				
Bissell Street Water Tower	1423 Bissell St. 38°40′13″N 90°12′20″W	1886		June 5, 1970		
Campbell House	1508 Locust St. 38°37′54″N 90°12′06″W	1851		April 20, 1977		
Carondelet Branch Library	6800 Michigan Ave. 38°33′17″N 90°15′15″W	1907		February 21, 2006		
Centenary Methodist Church	N. 16th St. & Pine St. 38°37′49″N 90°12′13″W	1869		January 15, 1977		
Central Baptist Church	2842 Washington Blvd. 38°38′09″N 90°13′09″W	1975				
Central Public Library	1301 Olive St. 38°37′50″N 90°11′58″W	1912				
Chase Park Plaza Hotel	212 N. Kingshighway Blvd. 38°38′42″N 90°15′52″W	1920				
Chatillon-DeMenil Mansion	3352 DeMenil Pl. 38°35′33″N 90°12′58″W	1849		June 9, 1978		1936 HABS photo
Chemical Building	721 Olive St. 38°37′43″N 90°11′32″W	1896		March 19, 1982		Chemical Building
Christ Baptist Church	3114 Lismore Ave. 38°39′23″N 90°12′41″W	1896				
Christ Church Cathedral	1210 Locust St. 38°37′50″N 90°11′54″W	1867		March 7, 1990	October 12, 1994	1942 HABS photo
Christian Peper Building (Raeder Place)	721–27 N. 1st St. 38°37′49″N 90°11′00″W	1874		August 25, 1976		
Church of the Messiah	508 N. Garrison Ave.	1879	1987	September 21, 1980		
City Hall	Tucker Blvd. & Market St. 38°37′36″N 90°11′58″W	1893				
Clemens House	1849 Cass Ave. 38°38′36″N 90°12′09″W	1860	2017	July 19, 1984		
Compton Hill Missionary Baptist Church	3141 LaSalle St. 38°37′26″N 90°13′47″W	c. 1892				Upload image
Compton Hill Water Tower	Grand Blvd. & Russell Blvd. 38°36′54″N 90°14′20″W	1899		September 29, 1972		
Convent of Sisters of St. Joseph	6400 Minnesota Ave. 38°33′23″N 90°15′02″W	1841		February 28, 1980		
Cupples House	3673 W. Pine Blvd. 38°38′12″N 90°14′09″W	1890		July 7, 1978		
Cupples Station	Clark Ave. to Interstate 64 between 8th St. to 11th St. 38°37′24″N 90°11′45″W	1894		June 26, 1998		
DeHodiamont House	951 Maple Pl. 38°39′40″N 90°17′32″W	1830		December 4, 2002		Emmanuel DeHodiamont House
DeSmet Hall	3647 West Pine Blvd.	1898	1977			Upload image
Eads Bridge	Washington Ave. & Mississippi River; 38°37′44″N 90°10′44″W	1874		October 15, 1966	January 29, 1964	1942 HABS photo
Eastern Star Missionary Baptist Church	3117 St. Louis Ave. 38°39′15″N 90°13′07″W	1912		December 16, 2012		
Eugene Field House	635 S. Broadway; 38°37′11″N 90°11′30″W	1845			March 29, 2007	1942 HABS photo
Feasting Fox (Al Smith's) Restaurant and Pub	4200 S. Grand Blvd. 38°34′51″N 90°14′38″W	1913		May 11, 2005		
Fox Theatre	523 N. Grand Blvd. 38°38′19″N 90°13′54″W	1929		October 8, 1976		
Goldenrod Showboat	Relocated to Calhoun County, Illinois; 39°20′28″N 90°37′10″W	1909			1968	
Grand Avenue (Old or White) Water Tower	20th St. and Grand Blvd. 38°40′13″N 90°12′31″W	1871		June 15, 1970		
Harris Row	18th St. between LaSalle St. & Hickory St. 38°37′09″N 90°12′37″W	c. 1874		June 28, 1972		
Hartley B. Comfort Building	920 Olive St. 38°37′45″N 90°11′40″W	1889		August 5, 1999		
Henry Shaw's Country House	Missouri Botanical Garden; 38°36′42″N 90°15′30″W	1849		November 19, 1971		
Henry Shaw's Town House	Missouri Botanical Garden; 38°36′39″N 90°15′28″W	1850		November 19, 1971		
Holy Corners	Kingshighway Blvd. between Westminster Pl. & Washington Ave. 38°39′01″N 90°15′49″W	1902–1908		December 29, 1975		
Holy Cross Lutheran Church	2650 Miami St. 38°35′23″N 90°13′41″W	1867		May 11, 2005		
Homer G. Phillips Hospital	2601 Whittier Ave. 38°39′31″N 90°14′09″W	1937		September 23, 1982		
Homes: 200-204 Steins and 7012 Minnesota	200–204 W. Steins St. & 7012 Minnesota Ave. 38°32′54″N 90°15′33″W; 38°33′09″N 90°15′18″W	c. 1840–50		March 27, 1980		
Intake Water Tower No. 1	Mississippi River Channel; 38°45′31″N 90°10′36″W	1894				Intake Water Tower No. 1
Intake Water Tower No. 2	Mississippi River Channel; 38°45′33″N 90°10′28″W	1913				Intake Water Tower No. 2
Jack Buck Statue	Busch Stadium; 38°37′25″N 90°11′34″W	1998				
Jefferson Memorial (original structure)	Lindell St. & DeBaliviere Ave. 38°38′44″N 90°17′09″W	1911				Jefferson Memorial
Kingsbury Place	Kingsbury Pl. & Kinshighway Blvd. 38°39′03″N 90°16′42″W	c. 1890–1910		June 11, 2007		
Kulage House	1904 E. College Ave. 38°40′34″N 90°12′46″W	1876		May 10, 2002		
Lammert Furniture Building	911 Washington Ave. 38°37′52″N 90°11′36″W	1897		March 24, 1987		
Lionberger House	3630 Grandel Square; 38°38′26″N 90°13′55″W	1886		July 7, 1978		
Lyle Mansion	Carondelet Park; 38°33′36″N 90°15′45″W	1842				
Masonic Temple	3681 Lindell Blvd. 38°38′17″N 90°14′07″W	1926		July 7, 1978		Masonic Temple
Maya Angelou Birthplace	3130 Hickory St. 38°37′21″N 90°13′47″W	1875 or earlier				
Meeting of the Waters Fountain	Aloe Plaza; 38°37′48″N 90°12′28″W	1940				
Memorial Home	S. Grand Blvd. & Magnolia Ave. 38°36′28″N 90°14′31″W	1867				
Mercantile Library Collection	Now in the Thomas Jefferson Library at UMSL	1846				
Merchandise Mart Building also known as Liggett and Myers (Rice-Stix) Building	1000 Washington Ave. 38°37′51″N 90°11′40″W	1889		March 24, 1987		
Merchants Laclede Building	408 Olive St. 38°37′38″N 90°11′18″W	1889		August 5, 1978		
Mississippi Valley Trust Building	401 Pine St. 38°37′36″N 90°11′18″W	1896		May 25, 2001		Mississippi Valley Trust Building
Missouri Athletic Club	409 Washington Ave. 38°37′48″N 90°11′14″W	1915		April 16, 2007		
Most Holy Trinity Church	3519 N. 14th St. 38°39′37″N 90°11′54″W	1899				
Naked Truth Statue	Compton Hill Reservoir Park; 38°36′53″N 90°14′20″W	1914				
Neighborhood Gardens Apartments Complex	1200 N. 8th St. 38°38′12″N 90°11′21″W	1935		January 30, 1986		
New Age Federal Savings & Loan	1401 N. Kingshighway Blvd. 38°39′42″N 90°15′43″W	1958				
New Jerusalem Church of God in Christ at the Cathedral	2047 E. Grand Blvd. 38°40′12″N 90°12′36″W	1916				
Old Cathedral	209 Walnut St. 38°37′26″N 90°11′15″W	1834		October 15, 1966		
Old Courthouse	11 N. 4th Street; 38°37′32″N 90°11′20″W	1859		October 15, 1966		
Old May Company Department Store Building	555 Washington Ave. 38°37′49″N 90°11′20″W	1875		June 23, 1983		
Old Mutual Bank Building	716 Locust St. 38°37′45″N 90°11′30″W	1917				
Old Post Office	815 Olive St. 38°37′45″N 90°11′34″W	1884		November 22, 1968	December 30, 1970	
Old Strassberger Music Conservatory	2300 S. Grand Blvd. 38°36′35″N 90°14′27″W	1904				
Oscar Waring House	1211 Tower Grove Ave. 38°37′32″N 90°15′25″W	c. 1881		December 19, 2012		Upload image
Page Boulevard Police Station	Northeast corner of Page Blvd. & Union Blvd. 38°39′40″N 90°16′18″W	1908	1995	September 10, 1980		Upload image
Park Keeper's House (Cabanne House)	Forest Park; 38°38′40″N 90°16′31″W	1875		June 10, 1986		
Pelican's Restaurant	2256 S. Grand Ave. 38°36′36″N 90°14′26″W	1895				
Pilgrim Congregational Church	826 Union Blvd. 38°39′17″N 90°16′22″W	1906		September 13, 2002		
Powell Symphony Hall	718 N. Grand Blvd. 38°38′25″N 90°13′49″W	1925		May 25, 2001		
Prince Hall Grand Lodge#2	3615-19 Dr. Martin Luther King Blvd. 38°38′51″N 90°13′37″W	1886	1995	1993		Upload image
Resurrection Church	3900 Meramec St. 38°35′03″N 90°15′06″W	1954				
Sacred Heart of Jesus Catholic Church	2830 N. 25th St. 38°39′11″N 90°12′31″W	1898	1986	August 30, 2011		Upload image
Schlichtig House	300 E. Marceau St. 38°32′25″N 90°15′45″W	1852		May 29, 1980		
Second Presbyterian Church	4501 Westminster Pl. 38°38′51″N 90°15′21″W	1896		September 10, 1975		
Security Building	319 N. 4th St. 38°37′41″N 90°11′16″W	1890		February 9, 2009		
Shaw Place	Ten Houses; 38°36′58″N 90°14′31″W	1879		April 12, 1982		
Sheldon Concert Hall	3646 Washington Ave. 38°38′24″N 90°13′59″W	1912		July 7, 1978		
Shining Light Tabernacle (formerly Christ Church)	7121 Manchester Rd. 38°36′58″N 90°18′40″W	1891		November 13, 2019		
Soulard Market	730 Carroll St. 38°36′39″N 90°12′03″W	1928		December 26, 1972		
South Broadway Bluff Area	c. 4500–5500 S. Broadway; 38°34′01″N 90°14′18″W					
SS. Peter and Paul Church	1919 S. 7th St. 38°36′25″N 90°12′13″W	c. 1873		December 26, 1972		
St. Mark's Episcopal Church	4712 Clifton Ave. 38°35′15″N 90°17′43″W	1939				
St. Alphonsus Catholic Church	1118 N. Grand Blvd. 38°38′39″N 90°13′41″W	1893				
St. Francis DeSales Church	2653 Ohio Ave. 38°36′14″N 90°13′33″W	1906		October 8, 2012		
St. Francis Xavier College Church	Lindell Blvd. & N. Grand Blvd. 38°38′13″N 90°13′59″W	1898		July 7, 1978		
St. John Nepomuk Church	S. 11th St. & Lafayette Ave. 38°36′44″N 90°12′19″W	1895		June 19, 1972		
St. John the Apostle and Evangelist Church	c. 1600 Chestnut St. 38°37′46″N 90°12′13″W	1869		July 11, 2007		
St. Joseph Church and Parish House	1220 N. 11th St. 38°38′13″N 90°11′34″W	1844		May 19, 1978		
St. Liborius Parish Complex	1835 N. Market St. 38°38′48″N 90°12′00″W	1857		October 11, 1979		
St. Louis Cathedral	4431 Lindell Blvd. 38°38′32″N 90°15′17″W	1914				
St. Mary of Victories Catholic Church	744 S. 3rd St. 38°37′05″N 90°11′26″W	1843		August 28, 1980		
St. Stanislaus Kostka Church	1419 N. 20th St. 38°38′31″N 90°12′21″W	1891		July 10, 1979		
St. Vincent de Paul Church	1417 S. 9th St. 38°36′48″N 90°12′02″W	1844		August 19, 1983		
Statue of St. Louis	Forest Park; 38°38′23″N 90°17′39″W	1906				
Steins House	Steins St. & Reilly St. 38°32′43″N 90°15′18″W	1843		May 28, 1980		
Stockstrom House	3400 Russell Blvd. 38°36′46″N 90°14′10″W	1907		November 8, 2018		
Store buildings	7121–7129 S. Broadway; 38°33′02″N 90°15′16″W	1850		February 22, 2006		
T.S. Eliot House	4446 Westminster Pl. 38°38′48″N 90°15′15″W	1904		April 10, 1980		
Tillie's Corner	1345-55 N. Garrison Ave. 38°38′40″N 90°13′13″W					
Towne Theatre	210 N. 6th St. 38°37′38″N 90°11′24″W	1896	1983			Upload image
Union Avenue Christian Church	733 Union Ave. 38°39′14″N 90°16′25″W	1904				
Union Market	711 North Broadway; 38°37′51″N 90°11′16″W	1924		January 15, 1984		Union Market
Union Station	1820 Market St. 38°37′45″N 90°12′26″W	1894		December 30, 1970	December 30, 1970	
Union Trust Building	705 Olive St. 38°37′42″N 90°11′30″W	1892		June 16, 1982		
United Missouri Bank Building	312 N. 8th St. 38°37′44″N 90°11′31″W	1892		November 21, 2000		
Vess Advertising Device	6th St. & O'Fallon St. 38°38′12″N 90°11′12″W	1950				
Veterans Administration Building	200 N. Broadway 38°37′37″N 90°11′20″W	1907	1977			Upload image
von Harten Residence	5433 Enright Ave. 38°39′17″N 90°16′38″W	1896				
Wainwright Building	705 Chestnut St. 38°37′38″N 90°11′32″W	1892		May 23, 1968	May 23, 1968	
Wainwright Tomb	Bellefontaine Cemetery 38°41′23″N 90°13′30″W	1892		June 15, 1970		
Walz House	4708 S. Broadway 38°34′13″N 90°14′04″W	1849	1982	June 14, 1970		Upload image
Washington Tabernacle Baptist Church	3200 Washington Ave. 38°38′14″N 90°13′31″W	1879				
Washington Terrace	48 Houses; 38°39′06″N 90°16′25″W	c. 1890–1910				
Westminster Presbyterian Church	5300 Delmar Blvd. 38°39′09″N 90°16′26″W	1925				
Woolworth Building	3663 Lindell Blvd. 38°38′16″N 90°14′05″W	1899		July 7, 1978		

== Historic districts ==
The city has 18 Local Historic Districts, 8 of which are Certified Local Historic Districts.

=== Local historic districts ===
- 4100-4300 Lindell
- Benton Park
- Cherokee-Lemp Brewery
- Kingsbury-Washington Terrace
- Lafayette Square
- McKinley Heights
- North I-44
- Tower Grove East
- Union Station
- The Ville

=== Certified local historic districts ===
- Central West End
- Compton Hill
- Fox Park
- Hyde Park
- Shaw Neighborhood
- Skinker-DeBaliviere-Catlin Tract-Parkview
- Soulard Neighborhood
- Visitation Park

== See also ==
- Landmarks of St. Louis, Missouri
- List of public art in St. Louis
- National Register of Historic Places listings in Downtown and Downtown West St. Louis
- National Register of Historic Places listings in St. Louis north and west of downtown
- National Register of Historic Places listings in St. Louis south and west of downtown
