= Scottish Rite Cathedral (St. Louis) =

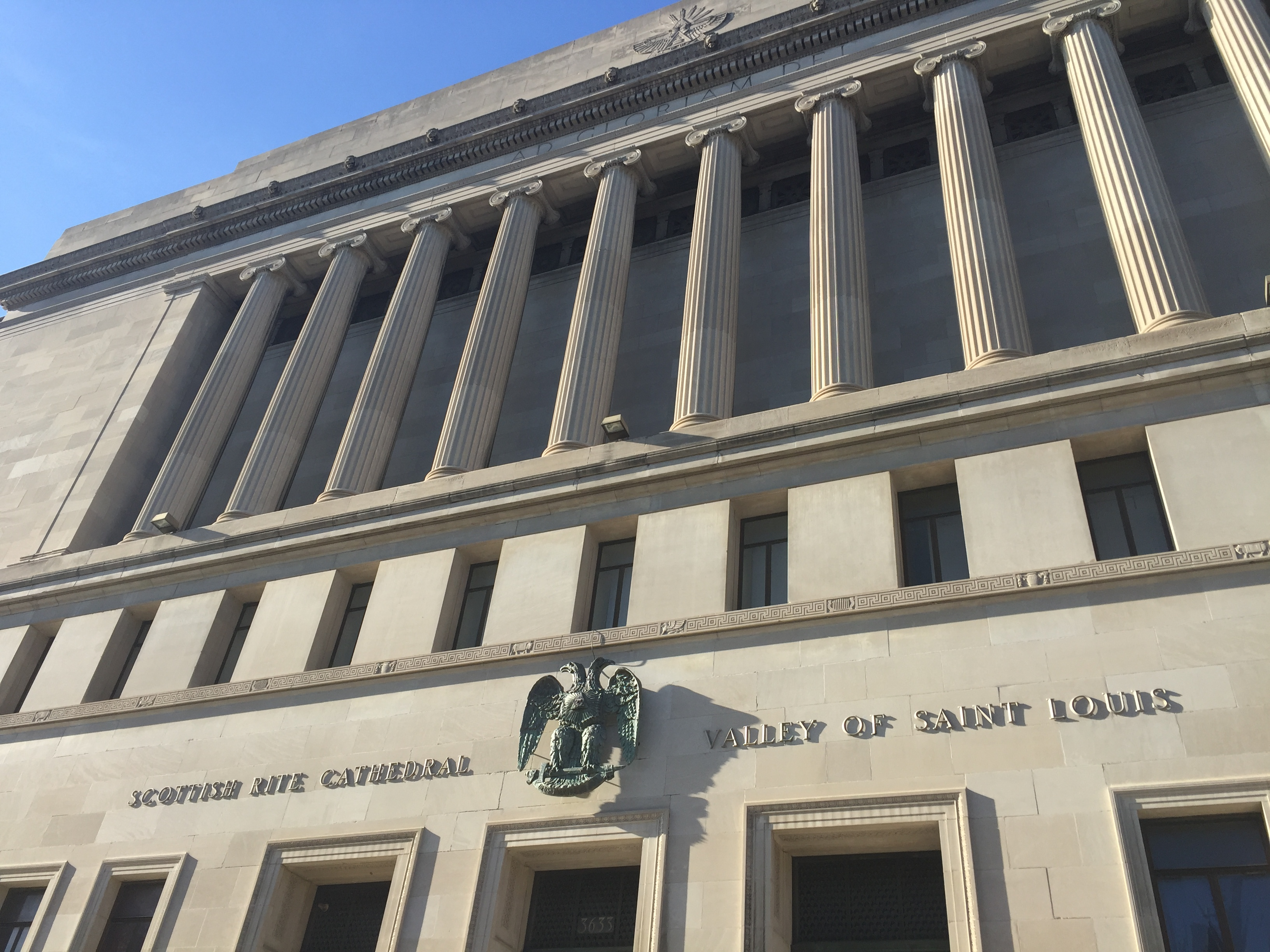
- Interactive map of Scottish Rite Cathedral
- 38°38′13″N 90°14′01″W
- Location: 3633 Lindell Boulevard, St. Louis, Missouri

History
- Built: 1924

The Scottish Rite Cathedral, at 3633 Lindell Boulevard in St. Louis, Missouri, is a historic, significant building that was designed by architect William B. Ittner. It was completed in 1924. "A fine example of neo Classic style, the building has a frontage of 235 feet and is approached by a broad flight of steps. Its auditorium, which seats 3000 persons, is notable because no posts obstruct the view. Features are an extremely wide proscenium and a fine organ. The granite and limestone structure was erected at a cost of $2,000,000."

== See also ==
- Moolah Temple, at 3821 Lindell, completed in 1912
- New Masonic Temple, at 3681 Lindell, completed in 1926
