= St. Liborius Church and Buildings =

Historic church in Missouri, United States

- U.S. National Register of Historic Places
- U.S. Historic district
- St. Louis Landmark
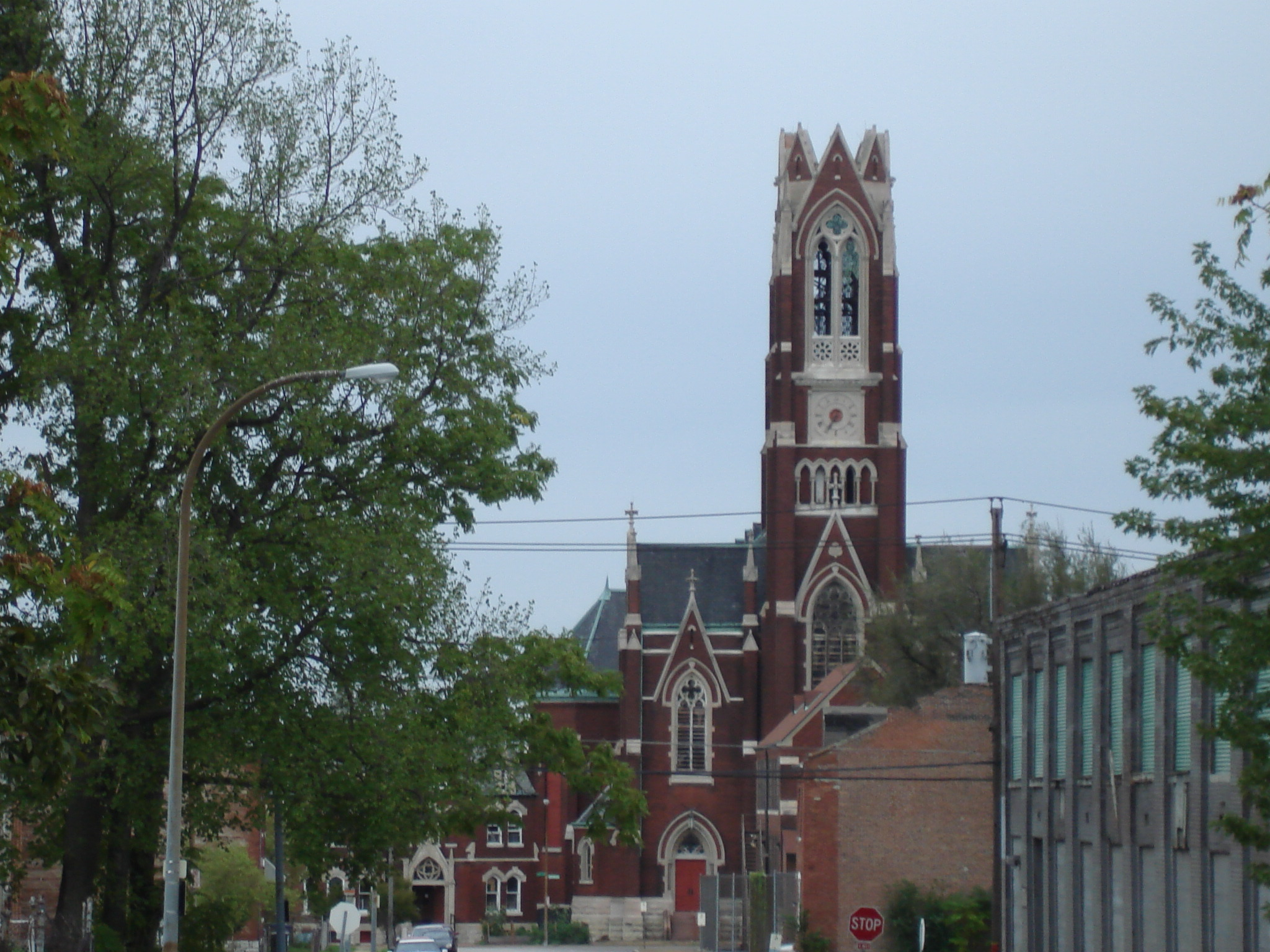
- St. Liborius Church in 2012

- Location within St. Louis Location within Missouri Location within the United States
- Location: 1835 N. 18th St. St. Louis, Missouri
- Coordinates: 38°38′48″N 90°11′59″W
- Built: 1889 (church); 1890 (rectory); 1905 (convent)
- Architect: William Shickel
- Architectural style: Gothic Revival
- NRHP reference No.: 79003637

Significant dates
- Added to NRHP: October 11, 1979
- Designated STLL: 1975

St. Liborius Church and Buildings is centered on the former Catholic parish of St. Liborius in the St. Louis Place neighborhood of St. Louis, Missouri, United States. The historic district is listed on the National Register of Historic Places and it is listed as a City Landmark in St. Louis.

== History ==
St. Liborius was established as a German national parish in 1856.

The church building is a large Gothic Revival structure covered in red brick. It was designed by New York City architect William Shickel. At one time the central bell tower featured a stone tracery spire. It was removed in the 1960s.

The church was completed in 1889. The rectory was built the following year and the convent was built in 1905. The School Sisters of Notre Dame taught in the parish school from 1859 to 1969. The parish buildings were declared a City Landmark in 1975 and listed on the National Register of Historic Places in 1979. A decrease in the number of Catholics in the area led to a merger with neighboring parishes. It merged with Our Lady of Perpetual Help, Holy Name, and Holy Trinity. The church was closed in 1992 and many of the church's decorative furnishings were sold at an auction in 1993. The property was purchased by Hogan Street Partners LLC.

The church has been renovated into a private skate park, named "Sk8 Liborius." In 2016, it was visited by RasTerms and Depoe. In late 2016, it was featured on an episode of VICELAND's Abandoned.

The church building, rectory and skate park inside were destroyed by a fire on June 29, 2023. A community effort is underway to rebuild the space.
