= Ollie Haupt Jr. =

American figure skater

Personal information
- Full name: Oliver Emil Haupt Jr.
- Born: February 28, 1892 St. Louis, Missouri, U.S.
- Died: February 17, 1984 (aged 91) Manhattan, New York City, U.S.

Figure skating career
- Country: United States
- Discipline: Men's singles, Pairs
- Partner: Jeanne Schulte (1935)
- Skating club: St. Louis Skating Club
Medal record
U.S. Figure Skating Championships
Bronze medal – third place	1938 Philadelphia	Singles
Silver medal – second place	1939 Saint Paul	Singles
Silver medal – second place	1940 Cleveland	Singles

Oliver Emil Haupt Jr. (February 28, 1892 – February 17, 1984) was an American figure skater. He was the 1934 Novice Men's Champion, 1935 Junior Pair Champion with Jeanne Schulte, 1938 U.S. Men's Bronze Medalist, 1939 & 1940 U.S. Men's Silver Medalist and a 1940 Olympic Team Member. He represented the St. Louis Skating Club. He was described by Popular Mechanics in 1940 as "one of America's outstanding figure skaters".
