= Walter S. Powell =

American ice skater

Walter S. Powell (16 August 1879 – 15 February 1961) was a director and manager for Brown Shoe Company, president of the St. Louis Skating Club, and president of the United States Figure Skating Association from 1943 to 1946.

He was born in Greenbackville, Virginia. After his term was complete, Powell remained very active in the international side of the sport, serving as the first chairman of the USFSA's International Committee from 1946 to 1952. He served on the International Skating Union Council from 1947 to 1961, and was the first representative of the United States to hold office in that organization.

Powell was on his way to the 1961 World Figure Skating Championships when he was killed in the crash of Sabena Flight 548 in Brussels, Belgium. Powell Hall, the home of the St. Louis Symphony Orchestra, was named in his honor.
