= St. Alphonsus Liguori Catholic Church (St. Louis) =

Church building in St Louis, MO

Coordinates: 38.64416°N 90.228062°W

St. Alphonsus Liguori "Rock" Catholic Church
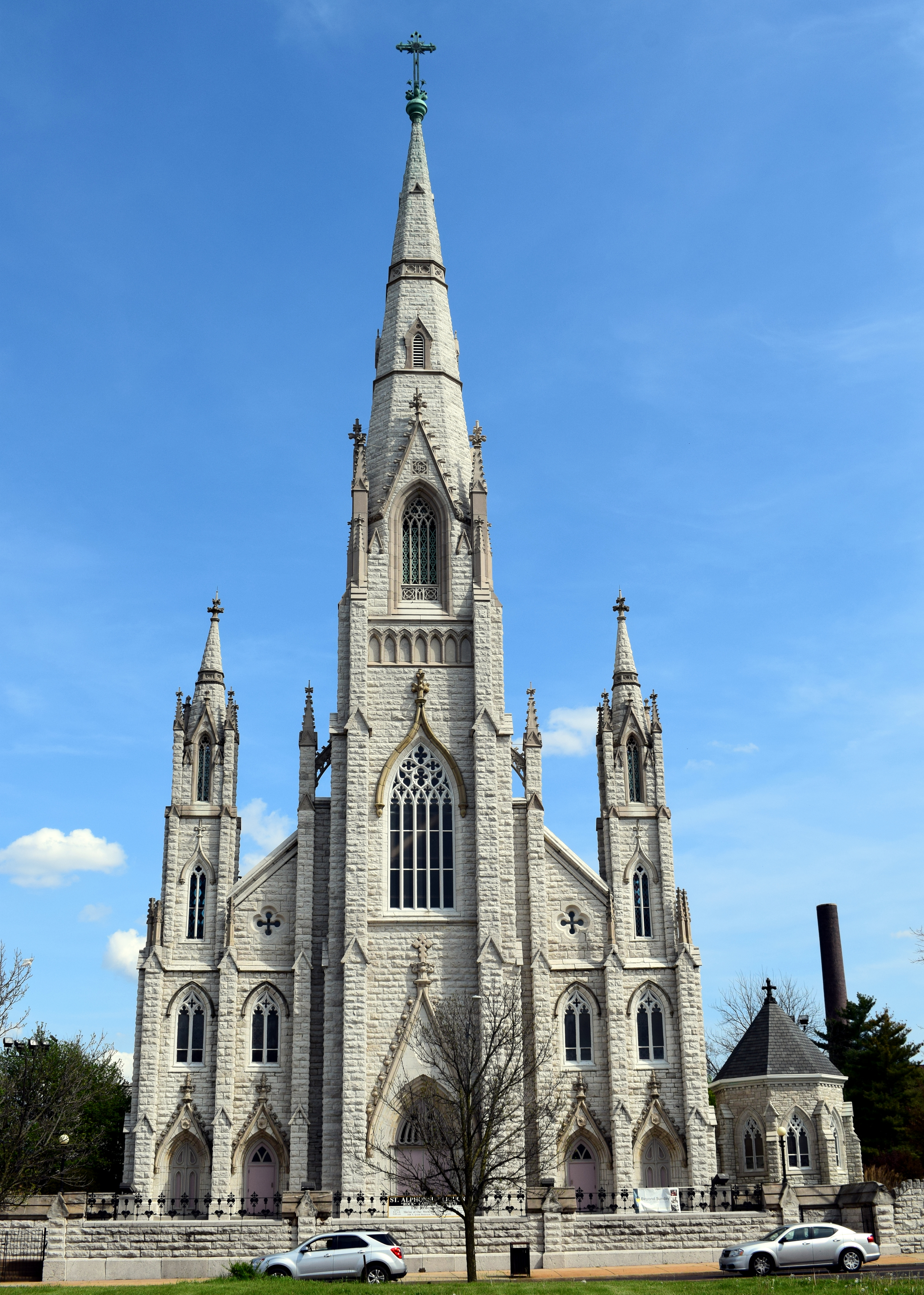

Religion
- Affiliation: Catholic Church
- Leadership: Rev. Stephen J. Benden, C.Ss.R (pastor) and Rev. Rodney Olive, C.Ss.R (associate pastor) Congregation of the Most Holy Redeemer

Location
- Location: 1118 N. Grand Ave. St. Louis, Missouri; United States
- Interactive map of St. Alphonsus Liguori "Rock"; Catholic Church

Architecture
- Architects: Rev. Louis Dold, C.Ss.R. Thomas Waryng Walsh (associate); James Smith (associate)
- Style: Gothic Revival
- Completed: 1872, 1893 (spire)

Specifications
- Direction of façade: West
- Spire height: 237 feet (72 m)
- Materials: Stone
- St. Louis Landmark

Website
- www.stalphonsusrock.org

St. Alphonsus Liguori "Rock" Catholic Church is an historic Black Catholic church in St. Louis, Missouri, founded in 1867. It is associated with the Redemptorist Order.

== Building ==
The edifice was built in a Gothic Revival style and has a towering steeple, flanking spires, and an assortment of stained glass. The design is attributed to the Rev. Louis Dold, C.Ss.R., working with St. Louis architects Thomas Waryng Walsh and James Smith.

== History ==
In 1861 St. Louis Archbishop Peter Richard Kenrick invited the Redemptorists, a missionary congregation that was founded by Saint Alphonsus Ligouri in 1732, to establish a permanent presence in the city of St. Louis. The community accepted the invitation and lived in temporary housing until 1866 when they bought 3.5 acres (1 ha) at Grand and Cook Avenues. Ground for the church was broken on May 1, 1867, and the cornerstone was laid on November 3 of the same year by the Rev. Joseph Melchers, the vicar general of the archdiocese. Construction on the church continued until 1872 and Archbishop Patrick J. Ryan dedicated the church that year. The church's spire, which reaches 237 feet (72 m), was completed in 1893.

The first Mother of Perpetual Help Shrine in the church was blessed on December 7, 1873, during the first public triduum under her name. The church ceased being a mission church in 1881 when it became a parish of the Archdiocese of St. Louis, although it remained under the pastoral care of the Redemptorists. The Redemptorists' St. Louis Province was headquartered in the residence from its founding until the mid-20th century.

There were two noteworthy visitors to the community in the 19th century. The year the property was bought in 1866, Blessed Francis Xavier Seelos visited while on a missionary preaching trip a year before his death. Venerable Augustus Tolton, the first African-American Catholic priest, said Mass for the School Sisters of Notre Dame in the convent’s chapel in 1887. The parish has grown over the years to become a predominantly African-American church.

The church was struck by lightning on August 16, 2007, sparking a fire that damaged the roof and leading to water damage when the fire was put out. Repairs commenced in fall 2007, and the church reopened in Spring 2009.

The church experienced a notable theft, of its air conditioning units, in April 2022. They received a grant for the restoration of their stained glass windows in February 2025.
