= Missouri Athletic Club Building =

- Missouri Athletic Club Downtown Clubhouse
- U.S. National Register of Historic Places
- St. Louis Landmark
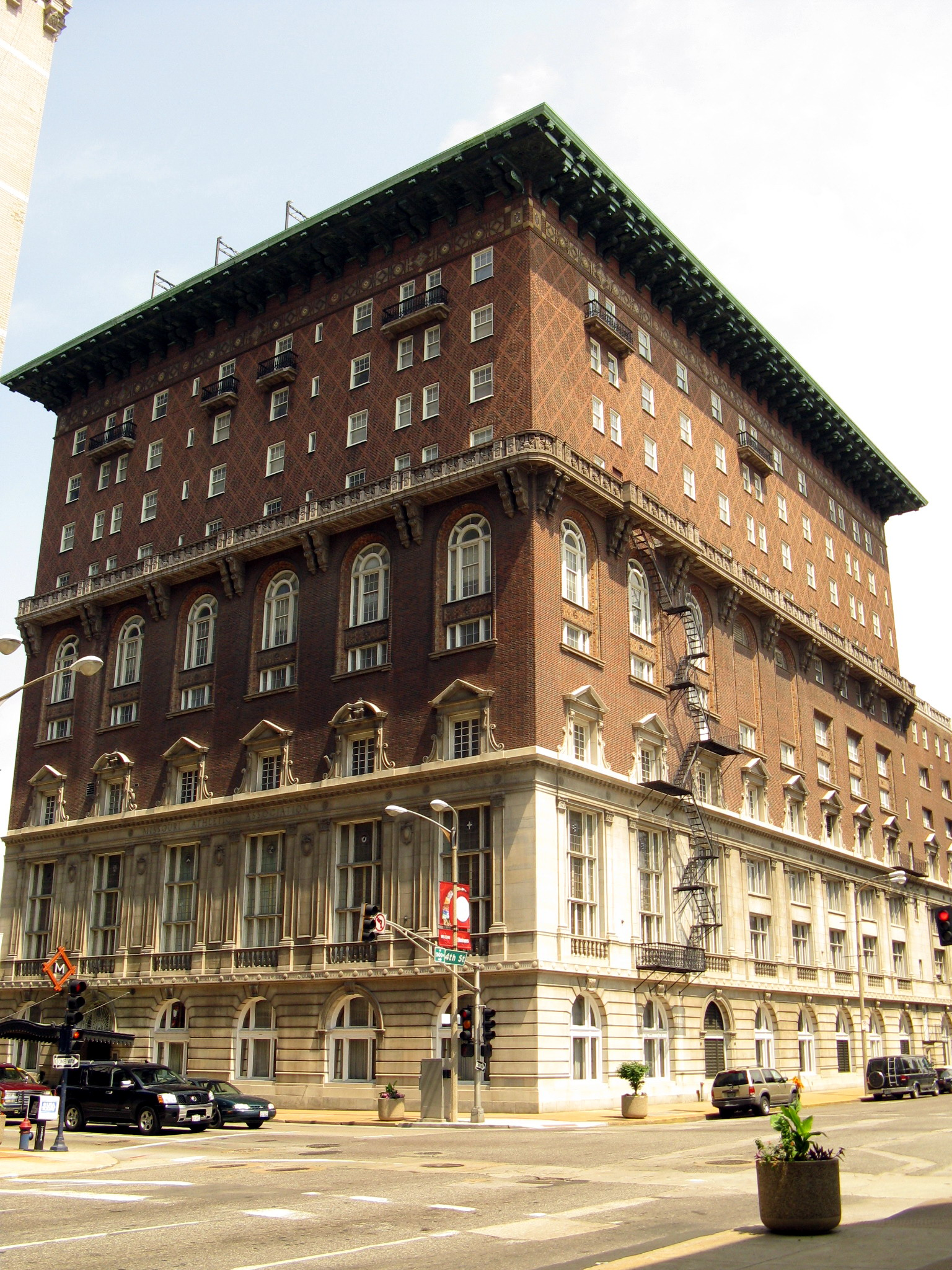
- Missouri Athletic Club's Downtown Clubhouse

- Location within St. Louis Location within Missouri Location within the United States
- Location: 405 Washington Ave., St. Louis, Missouri
- Coordinates: 38°37′54″N 90°11′14″W
- Area: less than one acre
- Architect: Ittner, William B.; Brueggemann, George
- Architectural style: Renaissance
- NRHP reference No.: 07000325
- Added to NRHP: April 16, 2007

The Missouri Athletic Club's Downtown Clubhouse is a historic building having Renaissance Revival architecture. It was added to the National Register of Historic Places in 2007.

The Missouri Athletic Club has two clubhouses. The Downtown Clubhouse is located at 405 Washington Avenue, at the corner of Fourth Street, adjacent to the entrance to the Eads Bridge on the Missouri side. Designed by William B. Ittner, the clubhouse contains two restaurants, a ballroom, a barber shop, numerous private meeting rooms, a reading room, a billiard parlor, a rooftop deck, more than 75 guest rooms, and full-service athletic facilities. The athletic facilities include weight training, a pro shop, whirlpools, tanning beds, wet and dry saunas, trainers, pros, a masseuse, squash courts, racquetball courts, and handball courts.
