= Emmanuel DeHodiamont House =

Historic house in Missouri, United States

- U.S. National Register of Historic Places
- St. Louis Landmark
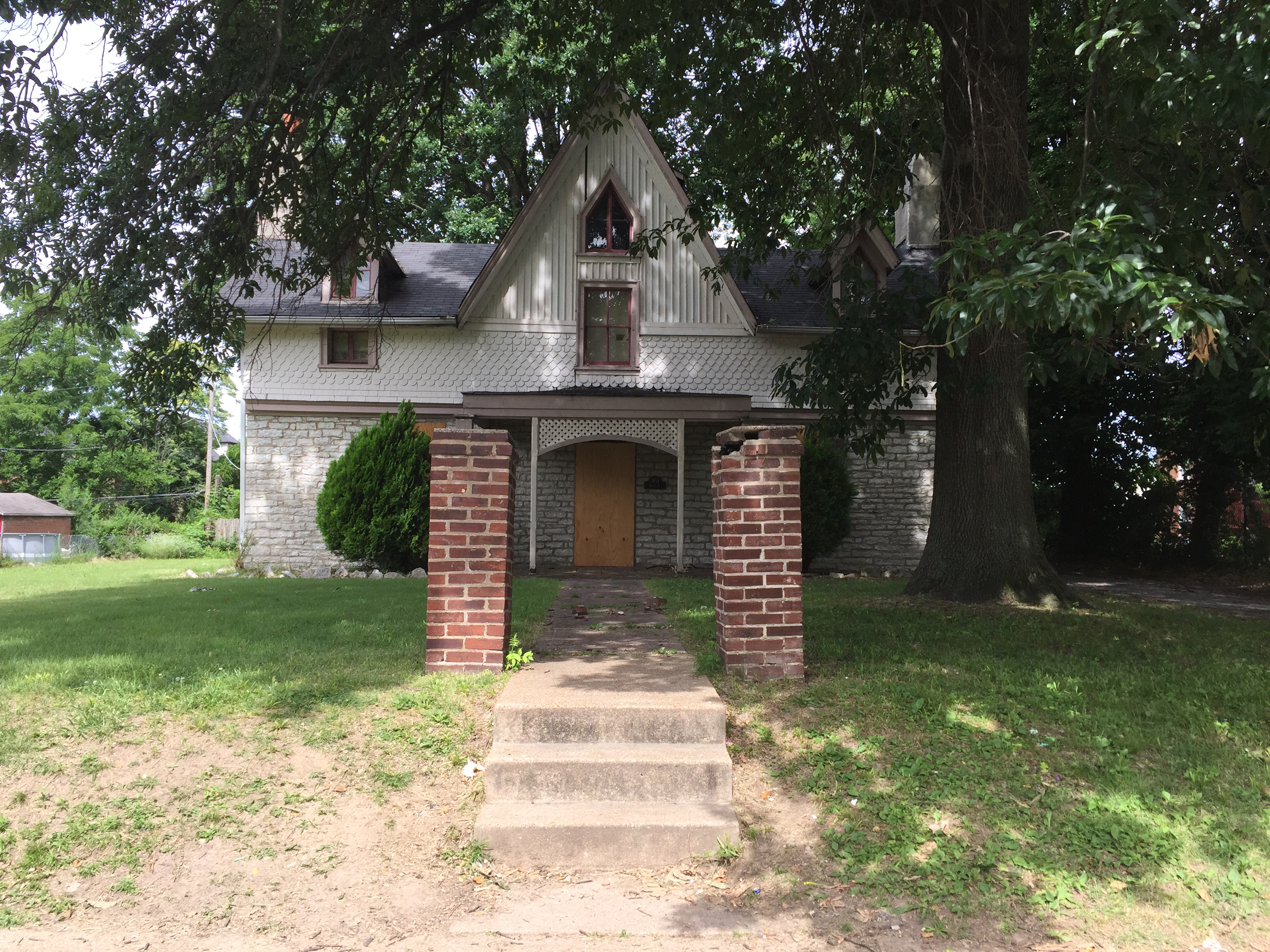
- Emmanuel DeHodiamont House in 2017

- Location within St. Louis Location within Missouri Location within the United States
- Location: 951 Maple Place, St. Louis, MO, United States
- Coordinates: 38°39′39.37″N 90°17′31.73″W
- Area: less than one acre
- Built: 1830
- Architectural style: Gothic Revival
- NRHP reference No.: 02001708
- Added to NRHP: January 15, 2003

The Emmanuel DeHodiamont House is a house located at 951 Maple Place in the West End neighborhood of St. Louis, Missouri. The house was originally constructed about 1830 by local farmer Emmanuel DeHodiamont and was modified into the Gothic Revival style about 1875. It shares the status of being the oldest extant residence in the city of St. Louis with the Lewis Bissell House, and it is the oldest privately owned building in St. Louis. It was listed as a St. Louis Landmark in 1966 and listed on the National Register of Historic Places on December 4, 2002.

== History ==
Emmanuel DeHodiamont and his wife Caroline purchased a 180-acre tract of land including parts of the River Des Peres in 1829 from Hypoline and Josephine Papin. No permits exist to date the original construction, but it is considered likely DeHodiamont built the structure soon after the purchase. Shortly after moving into the house, DeHodiamont's wife died, and he remarried in 1833. However, his new wife abandoned him in 1836, and he divorced her. He continued to farm the land until 1871, when he sold the house and remaining nearby property to land speculators. These speculators anticipated the construction of a railroad from St. Louis, which occurred in 1875. By that time, the house and its 57 acres were platted into a parcel called Maryville. It was likely at this time that the current Gothic Revival architecture was added. Construction of homes in the new subdivision was relatively slow until the 1890s, when most of the land was sold and developed. Houses that surround the DeHodiamont House date from this period and to the 1960s, when many of the circa 1890s houses were demolished and redeveloped.

== Architecture ==
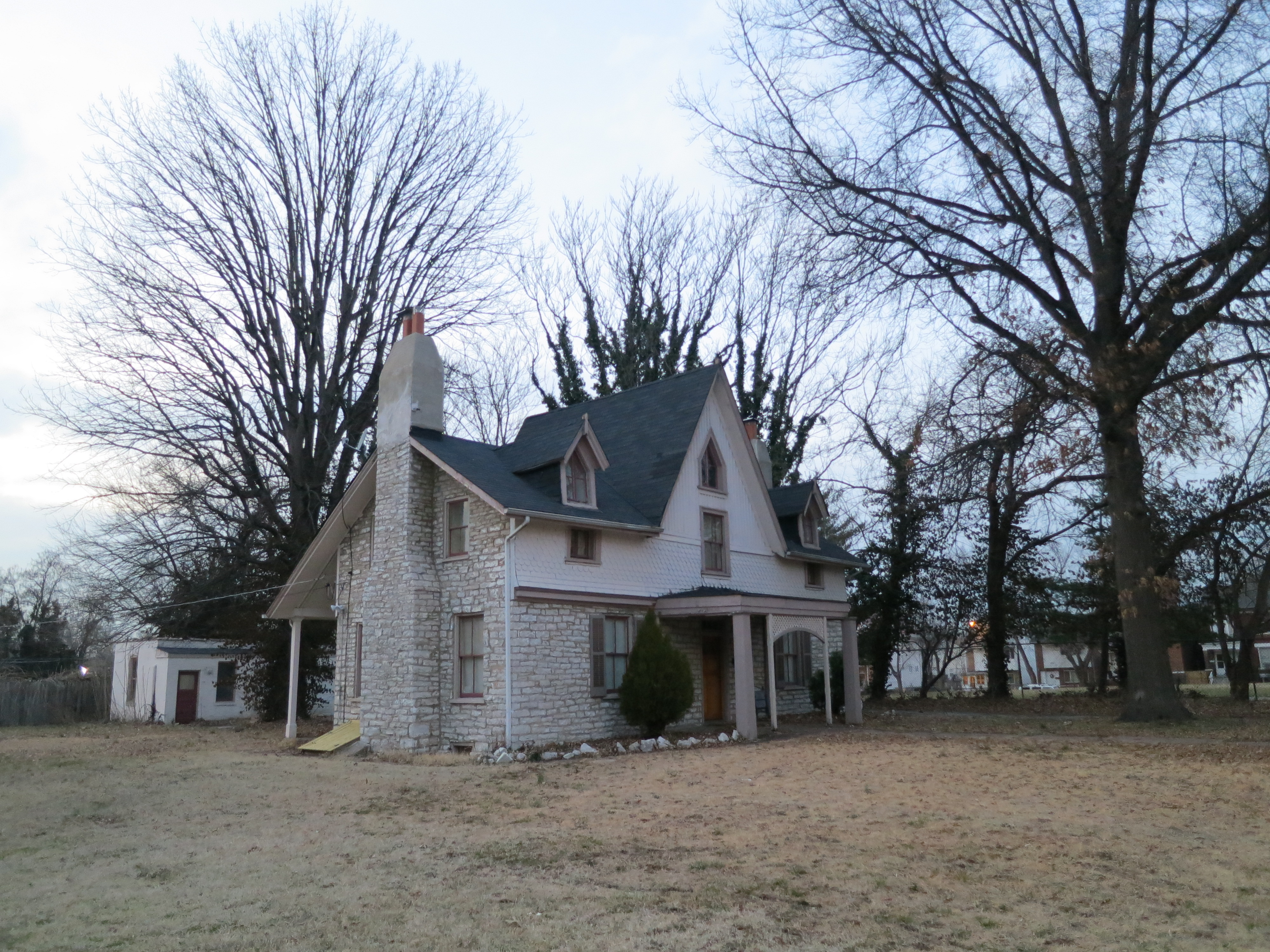
Emmanuel DeHodiamont House

The portion of the house dating to 1830 is a 1 1/2-story stone house, measuring 20 by 40 feet. The stone walls are nearly two feet thick, and the house retains its two original chimneys at the south and north ends of the house. The second story of the house is wood framed, and the center of the house has a high-pitched gable, both dating to the 1875 addition. The door placement and window placement on the first floor are original to the 1830 plans of the house. In 1890 and 1906, brick kitchen additions were made to the rear of the house. The first floor interior of the house has two nearly identical rooms, divided by a central corridor with a staircase. The north room opens into the kitchen at the rear. The second floor has two bedrooms, both nearly identical. In the back yard of the house stands a brick garage built in 1904, which is a contributing resource to the house listing.

== Significance ==
The house has the dual significance of being an "exceptionally early stone house" and a "rare example of the early Gothic Revival style in St. Louis." Although a great number of stone houses were built in the St. Louis area prior to the 1850s, most of these were demolished as the commercial district of the original city expanded. Not only is the DeHodiamont House an early stone house, but it also is one of the earliest known houses to still exist in the St. Louis. It is also listed as a St. Louis City Landmark.

== See also ==
- List of the oldest buildings in Missouri
