= St. Louis Skating Club =

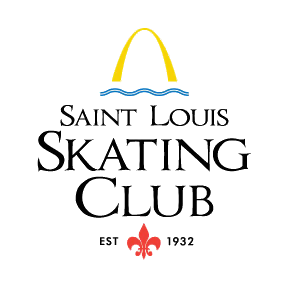
- Abbreviation: SLSC
- Formation: 1932
- Headquarters: Brentwood Ice Arena
- Location: St. Louis, Missouri
- Region served: Upper Great Lakes
- Affiliations: U.S. Figure Skating
- Website: www.stlouisskatingclub.org

The St. Louis Skating Club is a figure skating club based in St. Louis, Missouri. The club is headquartered at Brentwood Ice Arena, 2505 S. Brentwood Blvd., Brentwood, MO.

== 1894 Formation ==
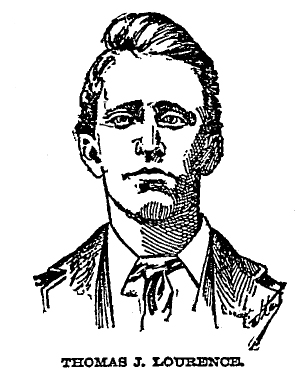

St. Louis Skating Club was the first ever skating club in St. Louis. It was formed December 13, 1894 on 13th Street in" North" St. Louis. The initial membership was twenty-four. Skaters participated in racing and "fancy skating" at St. Louis Post-Dispatch Lake in Forest Park.

=== Inaugural Board Officers ===
- Tom J. Lourence, President
- Sam J. Clifford, Vice President
- Otto L. Wuebbold, Secretary/Treasurer

=== Charter members ===
Orlinda Thias, Jessie Floreth, Maud Washington, Lotta Cooper, Letta Cornwall, Julia Durnan, Mary O'Donnell, Kate Lourence, Eva Lourence, Mamie Ross, Florence Mullally, Sadie Grace, John Beck, C.H. Hitchcock, Nacey Harkins, Julius Thias, Richard Lourence, John O'Donnell, Richard Durnan, Thomas Clark and John Coffey.

=== Club Logo ===
The club logo depicted two skates in the middle with the club name over the top which members wore on a button.

=== Club Colors and Headquarters ===
Club members painted the top of their skates red and the runners white and blue striped. Skating mostly on the Post-Dispatch Lake in Forest Park (St. Louis, Missouri), the club promoted both "fancy skating" and skating races. The members were interested in roller skating during the warmer months.

== 1918 and 1930 Reformations ==
The club was formed again circa 1918, and then again in 1930. In 1930, the membership included:

Board officers:

- Erwin Philip Hilts, President
- Arthur Naslund, Vice-President
- William R. Cady, Secretary and Treasurer

Members: Mr. and Mrs. Hilts, Mr. and Mrs. Cady, Miss Janet Kauffman, Mrs. Walter F. Koken, Father Joseph A. McMahon, Mrs. Eugene T. Senseney, Mr. and Mrs. Henry Kemper, Mr. Arthur Naslund, Dr. and Mrs. Walter Baumgarten, Mr. and Mrs. C. G. Beach, Dr. and Mrs. Louis Burlingham, Miss Pauline Bartels, Mrs. V. J. Azbe, Miss Margaret Bruen, Mr. and Mrs. F. L. Denby, Mr. Fred G. Durbrow, Miss Katherine Durbrow, Miss Nancy Durbrow, Miss Helen Dykeman, Mrs. Edgar Jennings, Mr. and Mrs. John S. Lionberger, Mr. and Mrs. Edward Mallinckrodt, Mrs. Richard Meade, Charles W. Moore, Miss Janice O'Gorman, Robert Piros, Miss Elizabeth Reflow, Dr. and Mrs. Horace W. Soper, William Shields, Mrs. and Mrs. H. B. Steinbreder, Mrs. A. B. Lawyer, Mrs. Edward J. Walsh, Miss Elizabeth Wright and Fred A. Stief.

The club skated at the Winter Garden Ice Rink located at 520 DeBaliviere, at the corner of DeBaliviere and Kingsbury Avenues. Monday 10-12 am & Monday and Wednesday 7 - 8pm. Coaches Mr. and Mrs. George Mueller

=== Club logo ===
The club logo was winged skate on a river in a circle surrounded by the words "St. Louis Skating Club."

=== 1932 – U.S. Figure Skating affiliation ===
The St. Louis Skating Club joined U.S. Figure Skating in 1932 and was the 12th club to do so.

=== 1938 – Incorporation ===
The club was incorporated as St. Louis Skating Club, Inc., a Benevolent Corporation in the state of Missouri on April 2, 1938. The 1938 membership consisted of:

==== Board officers ====
- Walter S. Powell, President
- Dorothy Hyland, Vice-President
- J.E. Banks, Secretary and Treasurer

==== Members ====
Jane Goddard Smyth, Margaret Ball Cady, William Cady, Len Fogassey, Margaret Banks, Josephine Fogassey, Mrs. Victor Azbe (Coyla), Martha M. Herman, E. J. Wallace, Martin M. Korwin, W.A. Handlan, Jr., J.A. McMahon, Henry Kemper, John B. Doolittle, Marion Kemper, A.D. Sargent, Myra Jean Azbe, Marian Henderson and Charles Herman.

The club skated at the Winter Garden Ice Rink located at 520 DeBaliviere, at the corner of DeBaliviere and Kingsbury Avenues. The building was razed in 1962, forcing the club to move to other area rinks including the Winterland Ice Rink and Castle Oak Ice Rink.

=== 1976 – Castle Oak Figure Skating Club ===
In 1976, St. Louis SC found a new home at the ice rink at Castle Oak Country Club located at I-270 and I-40 – currently the Chesterfield Athletic Club attached to a DoubleTree Hotel. In order to call this rink home, the facility asked that the club change its name to match the club. St. Louis SC was officially changed to the Castle Oak FSC. However, the arrangement was short-lived, as the club looked for a new home and the name reverted in 1978.

=== 1979 - Gateway/St. Louis Figure Skating Club ===
St. Louis SC and Gateway FSC merged in 1979. Gateway FSC of MO was headquartered at the Brentwood Ice Arena at the time the clubs merged and remained there.

=== 1987 - Brentwood Figure Skating Club ===
In 1987, after a request by the mayor of the city of Brentwood, the club changed its name to match the facility. This agreement remained in place for 10 years.

=== 1997 - St. Louis Skating Club ===
In 1997, after a change in city mayor and facility staff at the Brentwood Ice Rink, the club was able to change its name back to St. Louis Skating Club.

== Club mergers ==
Throughout its history, two clubs have been known to have merged with St. Louis Skating Club.

=== Wintergarden FSC / Forest Park FSC / Gateway FSC of Missouri ===
The Wintergarden Figure Skating Club's inaugural season was 1947–48 with 46 members. The club skated at the Winter Garden Ice Arena along with the St. Louis Skating Club. Mary Abele was their membership contact. At first, the formation of a second club significantly impacted the membership of SLSC. Eventually, many skaters were members of both in order to utilize the ice time available by both organizations. The Wintergarden FSC changed its name to Forest Park FSC in 1956. The club moved to Steinberg Skating Rink immediately after it was built in November 1957. The club left Steinberg in 1961 and immediately changed its name to "Gateway Figure Skating Club of Missouri".

Gateway Figure Skating Club of Missouri was incorporated in the state of Missouri on October 26, 1961. The club was headquartered for a period at Saints Olivette Ice Skating Rink, 1168 N. Warson Rd., Saint Louis, MO 63132. In 1975, the club found a new home at the newly built Brentwood Ice Rink, 2505 S. Brentwood Blvd., Brentwood, MO 63144.

==== Board officers ====
- William G. Rickard, President
- Robert McMullen, Vice-President
- Norma Wylie, Secretary/Treasurer

==== Board members ====
Mary Ellen Young, Mary Abele, Rev. William Doyle, Eleanore Meyer, Jules Monti, Paul Rogers, Nick Skrainka, John Tolcou and Harold Weissler

== Notable members ==
A partial list of notable members or skaters who have trained at or represented St. Louis Skating Club:

- Katherine Durbrow, skater
- Joseph Forshaw
- Helen Geekie, skater
- Ollie Haupt, Jr., skater
- Gloria Haupt, skater
- Erwin P. Hilts, President
- Jack Jost, skater and coach
- Debbie Knubley, skater
- Brandon Mroz, skater
- Walter S. Powell, President
