= Moolah Temple =

Coordinates: 38°38′21″N 90°14′21″W

Moolah Temple of the Mystic Shrine
- Location: 3821 Lindell Boulevard, St. Louis, Missouri
- Built: 1912−1914

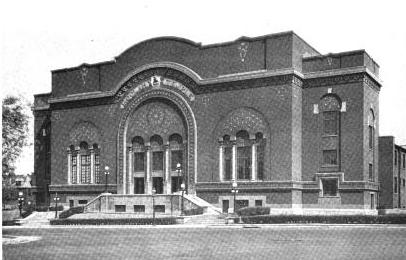
Moolah Temple, c. 1922

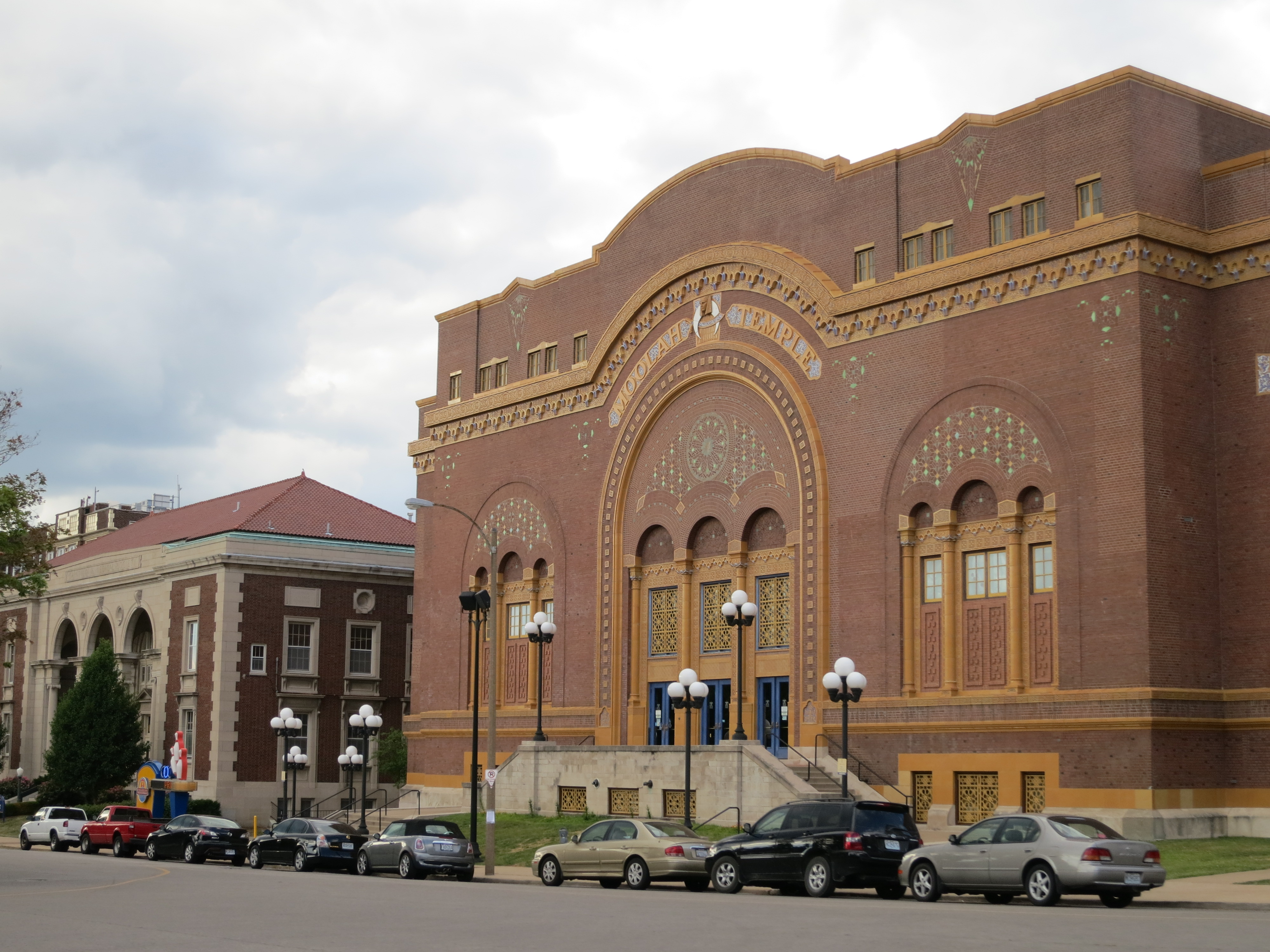
Moolah Theatre in 2012

The Moolah Temple, formally the Moolah Temple of the Mystic Shrine, is a historic building located at 3821 Lindell, in St. Louis, Missouri. It was built in 1912 for use as a meeting place, and is "a brick and tile building in the Moorish style.

It was built by the Moolah Shriners as the 28th Shrine Temple to be chartered. Moolah Temple as a name also refers to the organization, which met in the late 19th century at various Freemason buildings and had over 133 members attending meetings at a point. In 1912 the organization took steps towards forming its own building. The Lindell Boulevard location was chosen and Ernest Helfensteller, Jr., of Helfensteller, Hirsch and Watson, was chosen as architect. The building was completed and the first meeting was held in March 1914. The building was used by the Moolah Shriners until 1988, when it relocated to a renovated junior high school on Fee Fee Road. The building operated as a movie theater until 2020, after a $17.2 million renovation in 2004, and 40 apartments.The building also lays home to Moolah Lanes — the oldest operating bowling alley in the city of St. Louis.

It is a contributing building in St. Louis's Midtown Historic District, listed on the U.S. National Register of Historic Places (NRHP). The district's NRHP nomination describes the building's architecture as "colorful".

The building faces on Kenrick Garden, a city park established in 1896.

== See also ==
- Glazed architectural terra-cotta
- Scottish Rite Cathedral (St. Louis), at 3627 Lindell Boulevard, completed in 1924
- New Masonic Temple (St. Louis), at 3681 Lindell, completed in 1926
