= New Masonic Temple (St. Louis) =

Coordinates: 38°38′18″N 90°14′06″W

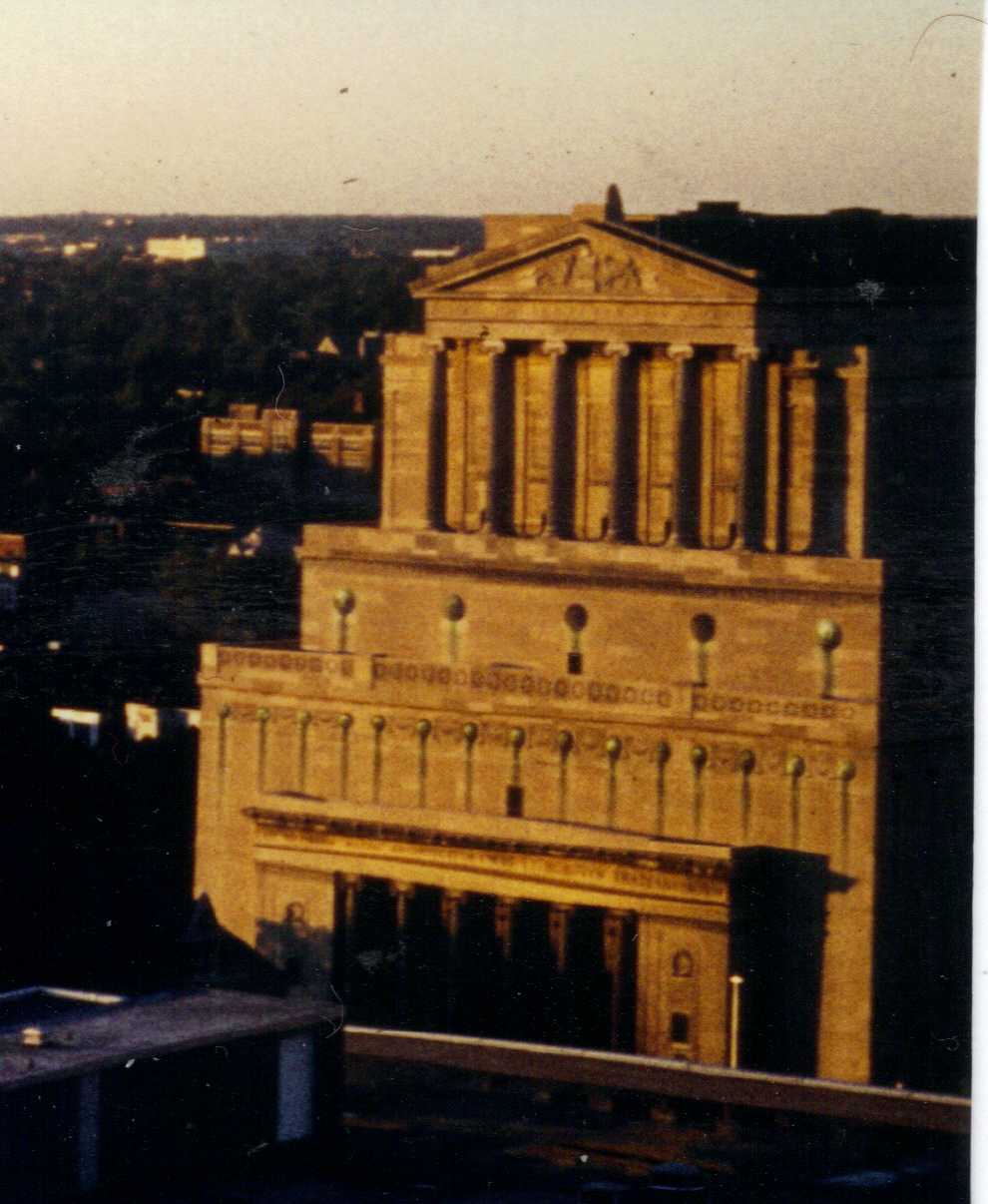
- Interactive map of New Masonic Temple
- Location: 3681 Lindell Boulevard, St. Louis, Missouri

History
- Built: 1926

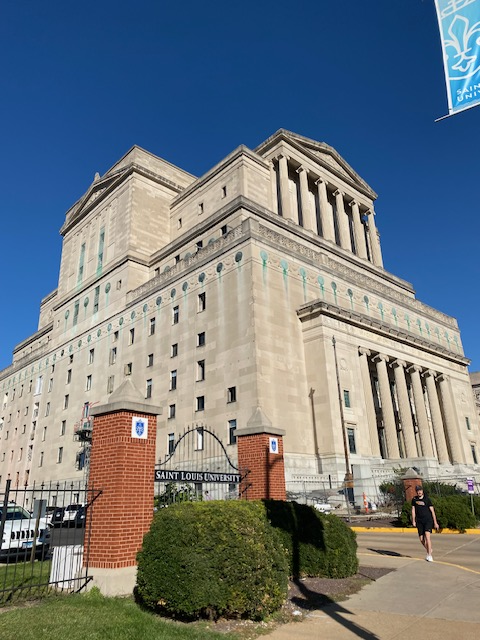
New Masonic Temple at 3681 Lindell Blvd. on 10 Oct 2023

The New Masonic Temple is a historic former Masonic building in St. Louis, Missouri, completed in 1926. Like many other buildings built for Freemason meeting places, it shows Classical Revival architecture.

Named a city landmark in 1976, the 386,000-square-foot building stands 185 feet high and encloses more than six million cubic feet. There are 14 levels: six full floors and eight mezzanines.

The building served as a major Masonic meeting place in St. Louis for more than 90 years. The Masonic Temple Association of St. Louis sold it to developer Brandonview LLC in 2017, after which the Masons briefly remained in the building before relocating. The building was subsequently redeveloped as an apartment complex known as B on Lindell, which began leasing apartments in 2024.

== History ==
The Temple's ground was broken in 1923 and dedicated in 1926. Designed by architectural firm Eames & Young with consulting architect Albert B. Groves, it features classic Greek Ionic-style exterior architecture with various styles throughout the interior.

The lobby contains a 38-foot mural titled The Origins of Freemasonry, created in 1941 by African American artist Jessie Housley Holliman. Dedicated by Senator Harry S. Truman, it is the only surviving mural by Holliman in a St. Louis public building.

Then-U.S. Senator and Missouri Grand Master Harry S. Truman kept an office in the building. Truman served as Grand Master of the Grand Lodge of Missouri from 1940 to 1941 while serving in the U.S. Senate. Charles A. Lindbergh, a member of Keystone Lodge No. 243 in St. Louis, completed his Masonic degrees in 1926 and participated as a Mason at the Temple before his 1927 transatlantic flight. During filming in 1980, the Temple's exterior was used to represent the New York Public Library in the 1981 film Escape from New York. Ernest Borgnine, who was also a Mason, attended Masonic meetings in the building.

== Architecture and Masonic use ==
The Masonic Temple was built in three receding stages, symbolic of the three steps in Masonry. It was constructed of Bedford limestone with gray granite trim, and the main lobby was finished in marble. The original building included an unfinished theater designed for approximately 2,200 seats.

During its period of Masonic use, the second floor contained the Eastern Star quarters. The third and fourth floors and their mezzanines were designed to house the Blue Lodges, with the potential for eight Blue Lodge halls. Four halls and much of the fourth floor were never completed, and one area on the third floor was converted into a dining room.

The fifth and sixth floors were designed to house three York Rite organizations: the Chapter, Council, and Commandery. Most of the building was nonsectarian in its decoration, but the fifth floor featured Christian symbolism. Its principal hall measured approximately 100 feet long, 75 feet wide, and 48 feet high.

== Sale and redevelopment ==
By the 2010s, the building had become much larger than the needs of the Masonic organizations using it. According to the Masonic Temple Association's real-estate broker, the number of organizations using the Temple had declined from between 50 and 70 in the 1920s to fewer than 40, while maintenance and updating of the 386,000-square-foot building had become an increasing financial burden.

The Masonic Temple Association sold the property to Brandonview LLC in 2017. The Masons remained for a short period under a rent-back arrangement while searching for a smaller facility. The association later purchased a 27,416-square-foot former church building at 15977 Clayton Road in Clarkson Valley for use as its new Masonic center.

Brandonview undertook a large-scale adaptive reuse of the Lindell building. Much of the interior was gutted and a parking structure was constructed within the existing building while its historic limestone exterior was retained. The development, named B on Lindell, was designed for 144 apartments with approximately 120 different floor plans and began leasing units in 2024 while work continued on the upper floors.

Several prominent historic spaces were preserved during the conversion. The original Masonic lobby, including the Holliman mural, was retained, while the large temple space on the upper floors was preserved with plans for use as an event space.

== See also ==
- Moolah Temple of the Mystic Shrine, at 3821 Lindell Boulevard, completed in 1912
- Scottish Rite Cathedral (St. Louis), at 3627 Lindell Boulevard, completed in 1924
