= Midtown Historic District (St. Louis) =

Historic district in Missouri, United States

- U.S. National Register of Historic Places
- U.S. Historic district
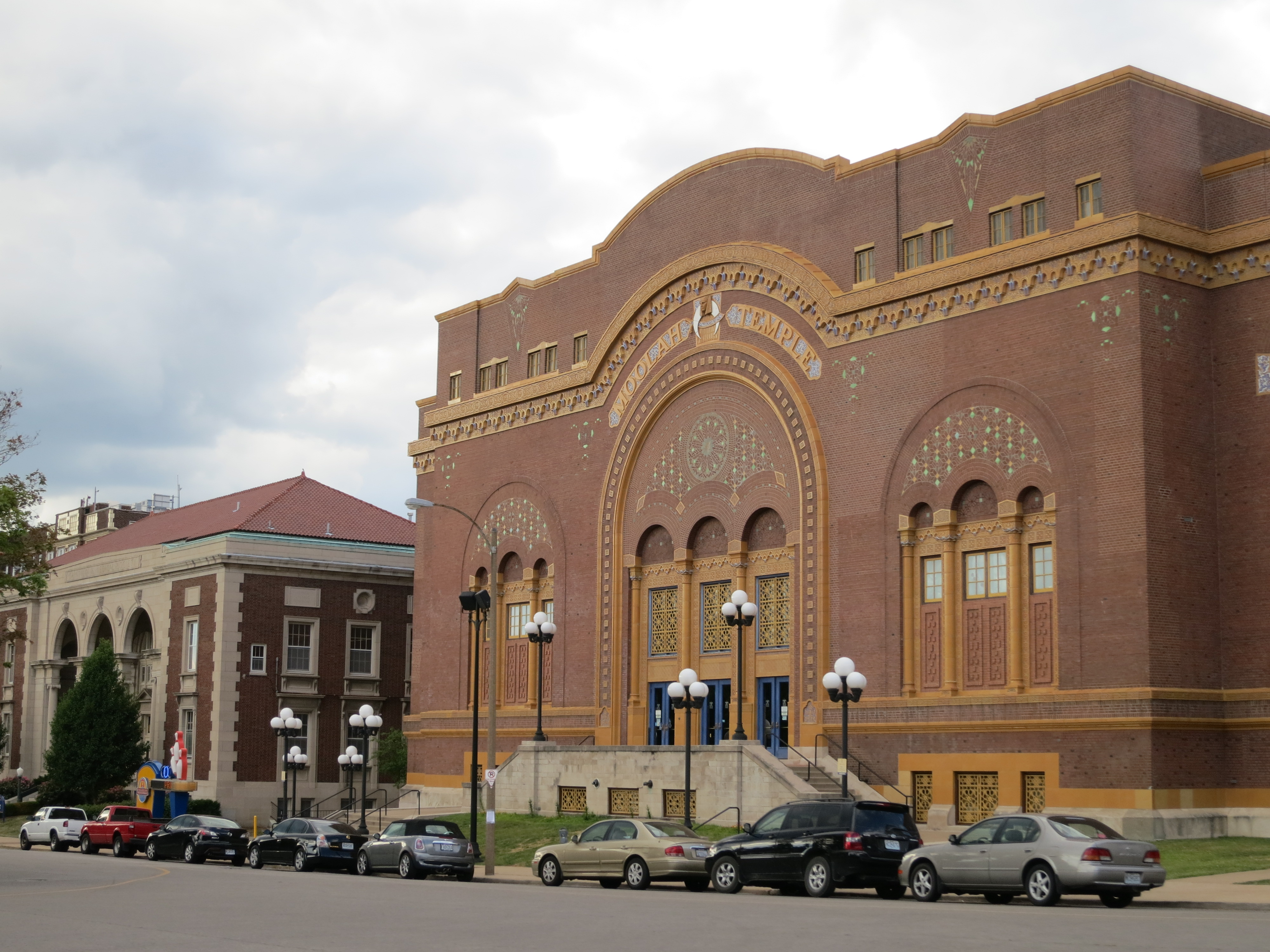
- The Moolah Temple (pictured), designed by Helfensteller, Hirsch and Watson is one of the contributing buildings.

- Location within St. Louis Location within Missouri Location within the United States
- Location: Lindell and Grand Blvds., St. Louis, Missouri
- Area: 76.8 acres (31.1 ha)
- Architect: Multiple
- Architectural style: Late Gothic Revival, Gothic, Late Victorian
- NRHP reference No.: 78003392
- Added to NRHP: July 7, 1978

The Midtown Historic District in St. Louis, Missouri is a historic district that was listed on the U.S. National Register of Historic Places in 1978. It includes 94 contributing buildings on a 76.8-acre (31.1 ha) area.

The Moolah Temple (1912), designed by Helfensteller, Hirsch and Watson is one of the contributing buildings.
