= North Hanley station =

Light rail station in St. Louis County, Missouri, US

North Hanley
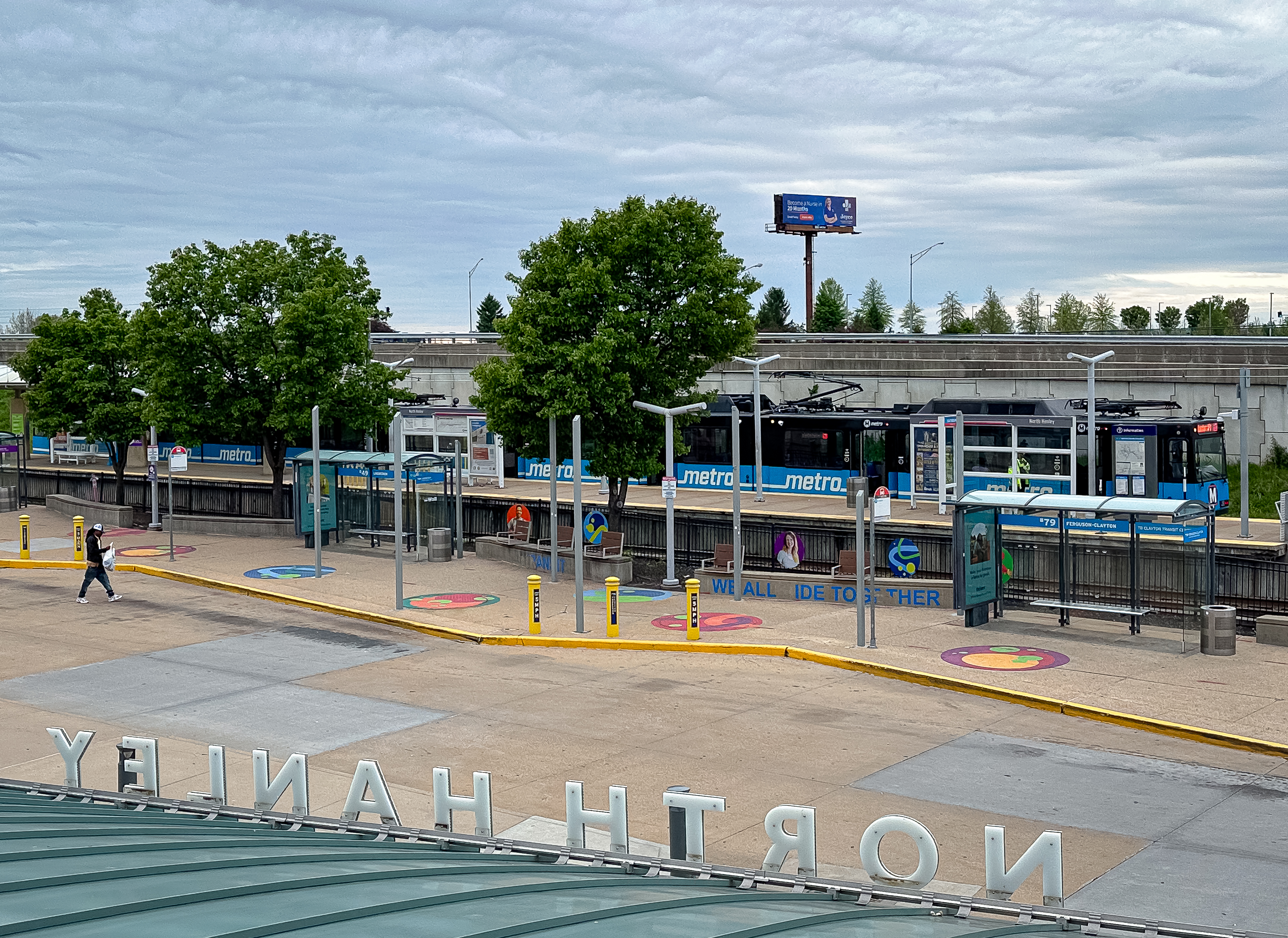
- A westbound Red Line train at the North Hanley platform

General information
- Location: 4300 Hanley Road; St. Louis, Missouri
- Coordinates: 38.719971°N 90.315747°W
- Owner: Bi-State Development
- Operator: Metro Transit
- Platforms: 1 island platform
- Tracks: 2
- Bus stands: 9
- Connections: MetroBus Missouri: 04, 34, 49, 61, 76, 77, 79, 98, 100

Construction
- Structure type: At-grade
- Parking: 1,731 spaces
- Cycle facilities: Rack
- Accessible: Yes

History
- Opened: July 31, 1993

Passengers
- 2018: 2,713 daily
- Rank: 3 out of 38

Services
Preceding station	MetroLink	Following station
Lambert Airport Terminal 2 toward Lambert Airport Terminal 1	Red Line	UMSL–North toward Shiloh–Scott
Location

North Hanley station is a light rail station on the Red Line of the St. Louis MetroLink system. This at-grade station is located near the intersection of North Hanley Road and Interstate 70 and primarily serves North County commuters with a large MetroBus transfer and 1,731 park-and-ride spaces.

== Station layout ==
The platform is reached via ramps and walkways on each end that connect to the bus-boarding area.

== Bus connections ==
The following MetroBus lines serve North Hanley station:

- 04 Natural Bridge
- 34 Earth City
- 49 Lindbergh
- 61 Chambers
- 76 North Hanley Shuttle
- 77 Village Square
- 79 Ferguson-Clayton
- 98 Ballas-North Hanley
- 100 Hazelwood

== Public artwork ==
In 2004, Metro's Arts in Transit program commissioned the work A Line Meant (Circular) Alignment (Reasoning) by Bob Hansman and Ben Hoffmann for this station. It is made of 20 four-inch square, stainless-steel tubes of various lengths that connect the parking garage's stairwell to nearby landscaping.

In 2022, the area between the bus bays and MetroLink entrance was updated with vibrantly colored elements in a “Transit: We All Ride Together” theme, including shade structures, seating, musical elements, ground murals, and window designs. The fourth "Transit Stop Transformation" project to be completed, it was unveiled on October 12, 2022, by Citizens for Modern Transit, AARP in St. Louis, and Metro Transit in partnership with several local agencies.
