= Richmond Heights station =

Light rail station in St. Louis County, Missouri, US

Richmond Heights
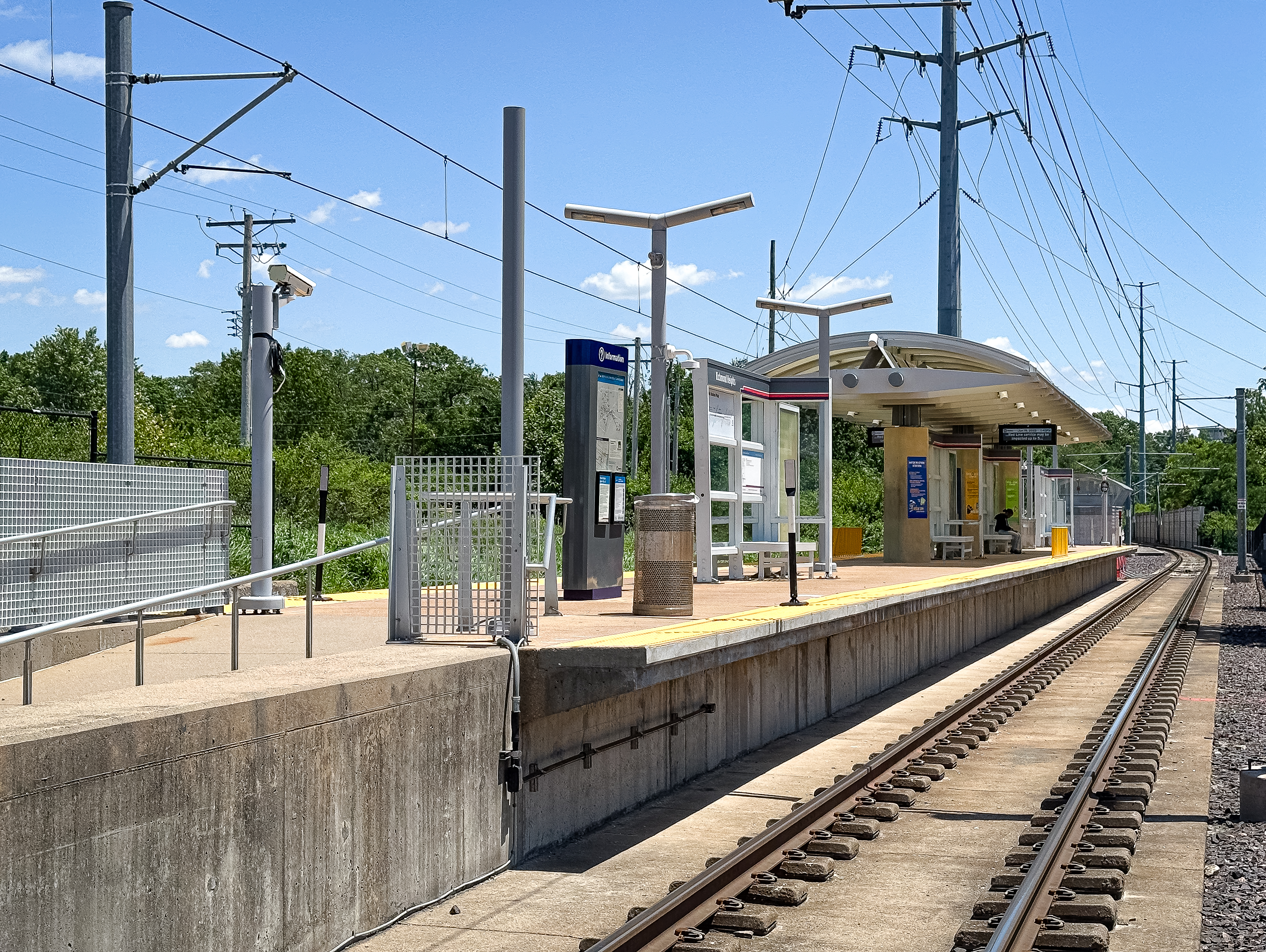
- Richmond Heights station in 2025

General information
- Location: 8001 Galleria Parkway; Richmond Heights, Missouri
- Coordinates: 38.634890°N 90.342183°W
- Owner: Bi-State Development
- Operator: Metro Transit
- Platforms: 1 island platform
- Tracks: 2

Construction
- Structure type: At-grade
- Parking: 57 spaces
- Cycle facilities: Rack
- Accessible: Yes

History
- Opened: August 26, 2006

Passengers
- 2018: 618 daily
- Rank: 23 out of 38

Services
Preceding station	MetroLink	Following station
Brentwood I-64 toward Shrewsbury–Lansdowne I-44	Blue Line	Clayton toward Fairview Heights
Location

Richmond Heights station is a light rail station on the Blue Line of the St. Louis MetroLink system. This at-grade station is located near the interchange of Interstate 170 and Galleria Parkway in Richmond Heights, Missouri.

The station has a small commuter parking lot with 57 spaces and includes a kiss and ride turnaround.

== Station layout ==
The island platform is accessed via a single ramp at the north end of the station.

== Public artwork ==
In 2009, Metro's Arts in Transit program commissioned the work Mime by Kristin Jones and Andrew Ginzel for this station. A collar of stainless steel convex mirrors absorbs and reflects everything seen in the station environs.

== Notable places nearby ==
- Saint Louis Galleria
