= MetroLink (St. Louis) =

Light rail system serving the Greater St. Louis area

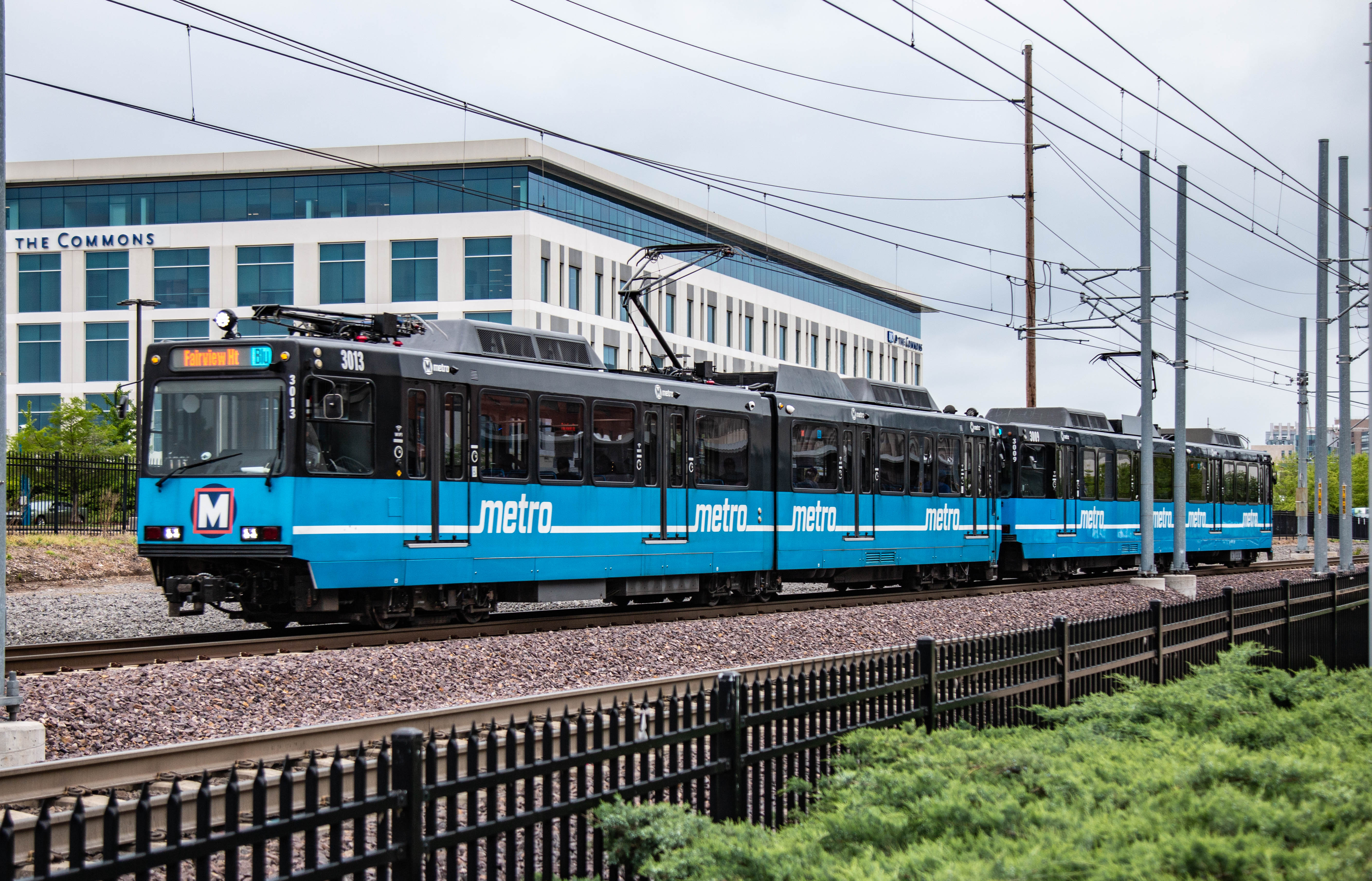
- MetroLink Blue Line train at Cortex station

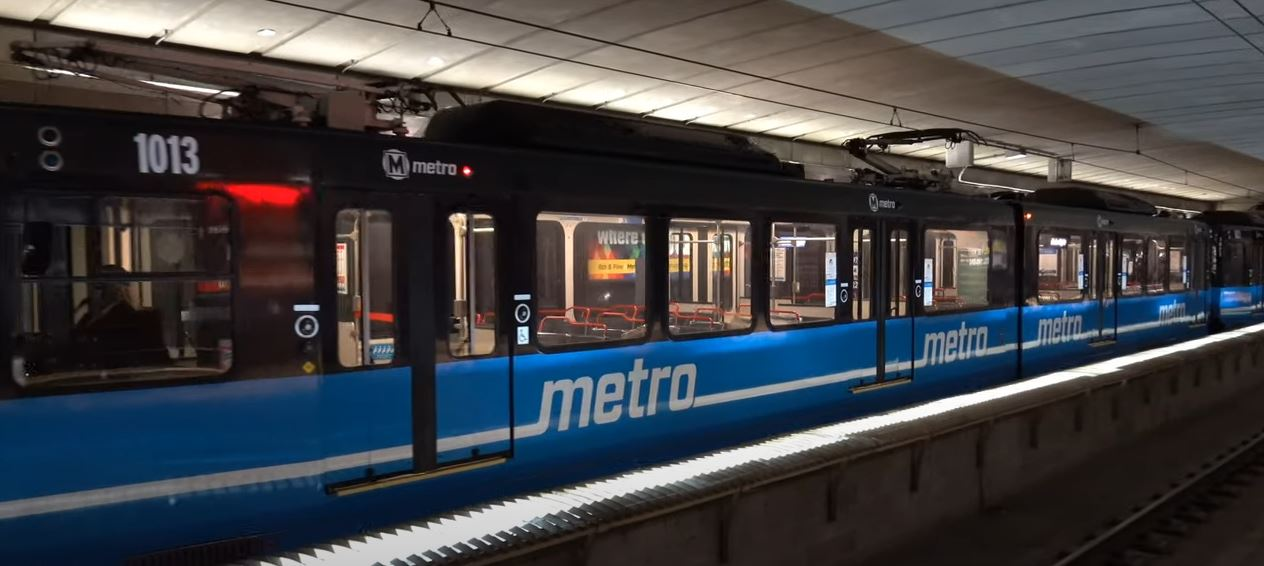
- MetroLink train at 8th & Pine station

Overview
- Owner: Bi-State Development Agency
- Locale: Greater St. Louis, Missouri–Illinois, U.S.
- Transit type: Light rail
- Number of lines: 2
- Number of stations: 38 (1 under construction)
- Daily ridership: 21,800 (weekdays, Q2 2026)
- Annual ridership: 7,665,000 (2025)
- Headquarters: One Metropolitan Square; 211 North Broadway; St. Louis, Missouri, 63102, U.S.
- Website: metrostlouis.org/metrolink

Operation
- Began operation: July 31, 1993
- Operator: Metro Transit
- Reporting marks: BSDA
- Character: At-grade, below-grade, elevated, subway
- Number of vehicles: 75
- Train length: 2 articulated vehicles
- Headway: 10–20 minutes

Technical
- System length: 51.2 mi (82.4 km)
- No. of tracks: 2
- Track gauge: 4 ft 8 1/2 in (1,435 mm) standard gauge
- Electrification: Overhead line, 750 V DC
- Average speed: 24.7 mph (40 km/h)
- Top speed: 65 mph (105 km/h)
System map

MetroLink (reporting mark BSDA) (commonly referred to as "Metro") is the light rail system that serves the Greater St. Louis area. It is operated by Metro Transit in a shared fare system with MetroBus. Currently, it is a two-line, 51.2-mile-long (82.4 km) system serving 38 stations operating primarily on separate grade with subway sections in downtown St. Louis and near Forest Park and Washington University in St. Louis.

Unlike the majority of LRT systems in the United States, St. Louis MetroLink shares more characteristics of a rapid transit service, including a largely independent right-of-way, a higher top speed, and level boarding at all platforms. In 2025, the system had an annual ridership of 7,665,000.

== History ==
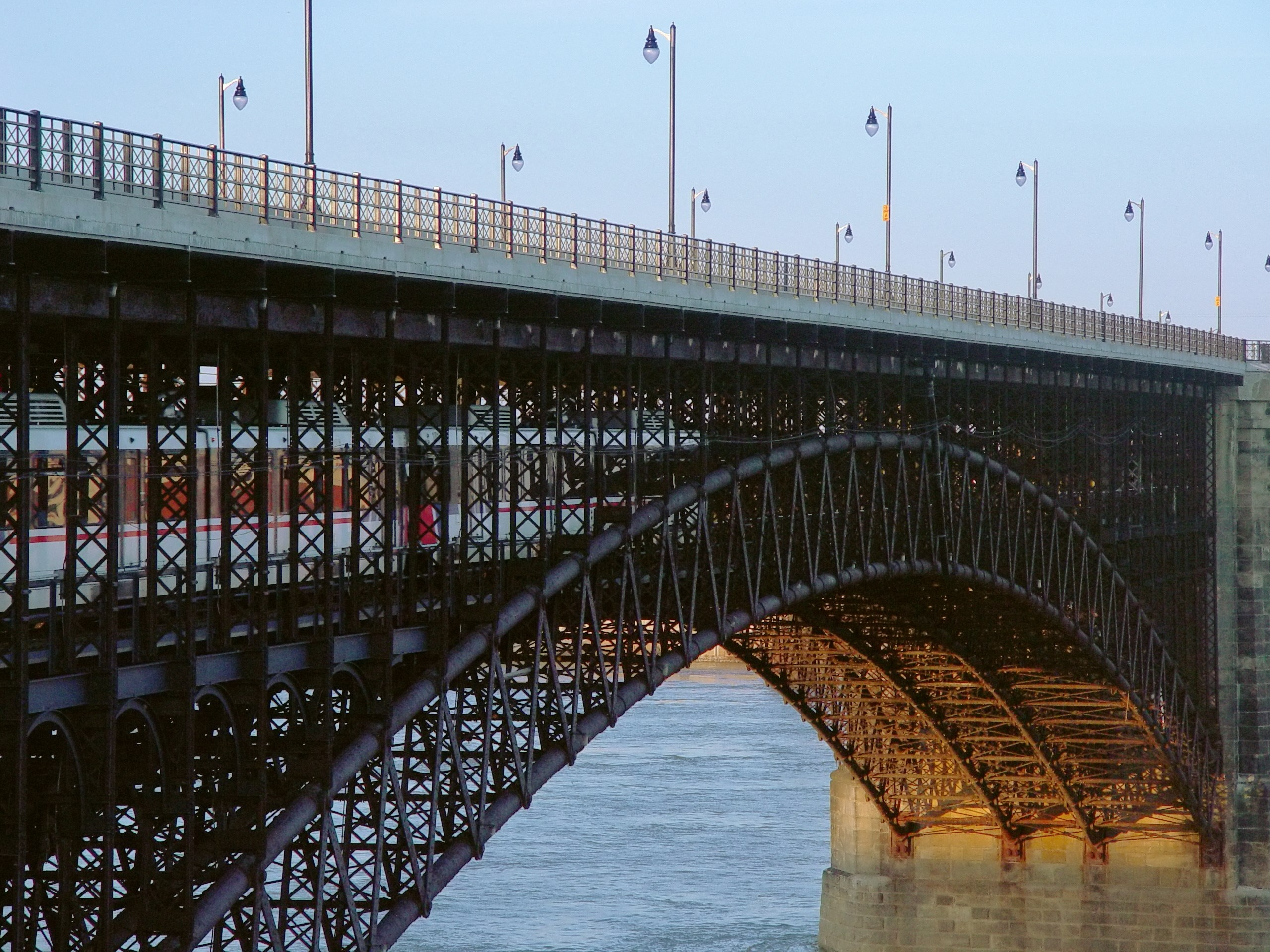
The 1874 Eads Bridge carries MetroLink across the Mississippi River between Missouri and Illinois on its lower-level rail deck.

Construction on the initial 17-mile (27 km) MetroLink line from St. Louis Lambert International Airport to the 5th & Missouri station in East St. Louis began in 1990. The first 13.9-mile (22.4 km) segment opened on July 31, 1993, with 16 stations between North Hanley and 5th & Missouri. The extension to Lambert Airport Main opened on June 25, 1994. Three infill stations have since been added to this alignment: East Riverfront in 1994, Lambert Airport East in 1998, and Cortex in 2018.

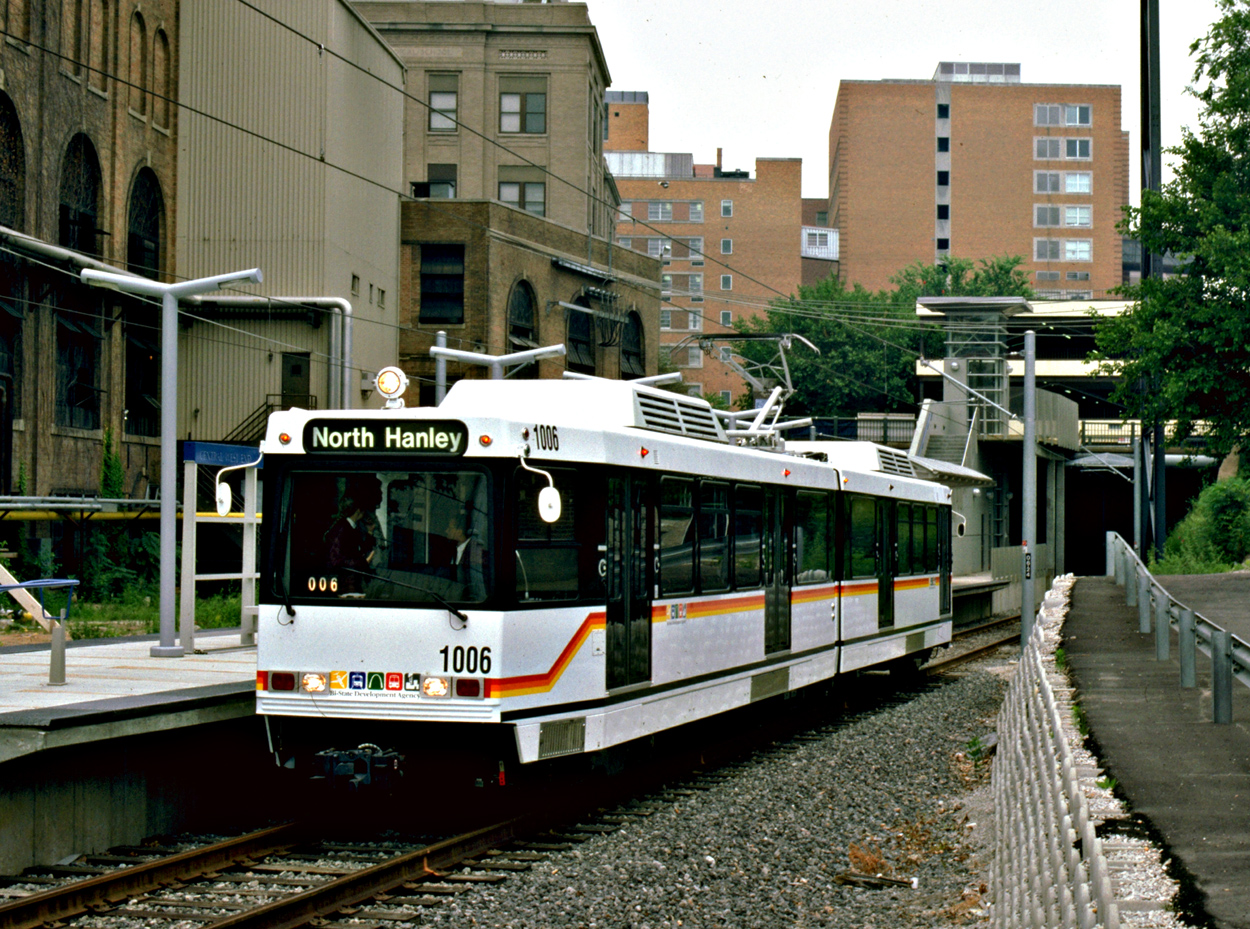
Siemens SD-400 unit on the then-newly opened MetroLink system in 1993.

About 14 miles (22.5 km) of the original 17-mile (27 km) alignment reused existing railroad right-of-way including historic downtown tunnels. The capital cost to build the initial phase of MetroLink was $465 million, including $348 million from the Federal Transit Administration (FTA).

Construction on the St. Clair County MetroLink extension from the 5th & Missouri station to the College station in Belleville began in 1998 and opened in May 2001. The extension added eight stations and seven park-ride lots. The total project cost was $339.2 million with $243.9 million paid by the FTA and $95.2 million paid by the St. Clair County Transit District (via a 1/2 cent sales tax passed in November 1993).

In May 2003, a 3.5-mile (5.6 km) extension from the college station to the Shiloh-Scott station opened. This $75 million project was funded by a $60 million grant from the Illinois FIRST (Fund for Infrastructure, Roads, Schools, and Transit) Program and $15 million from the St. Clair County Transit District.

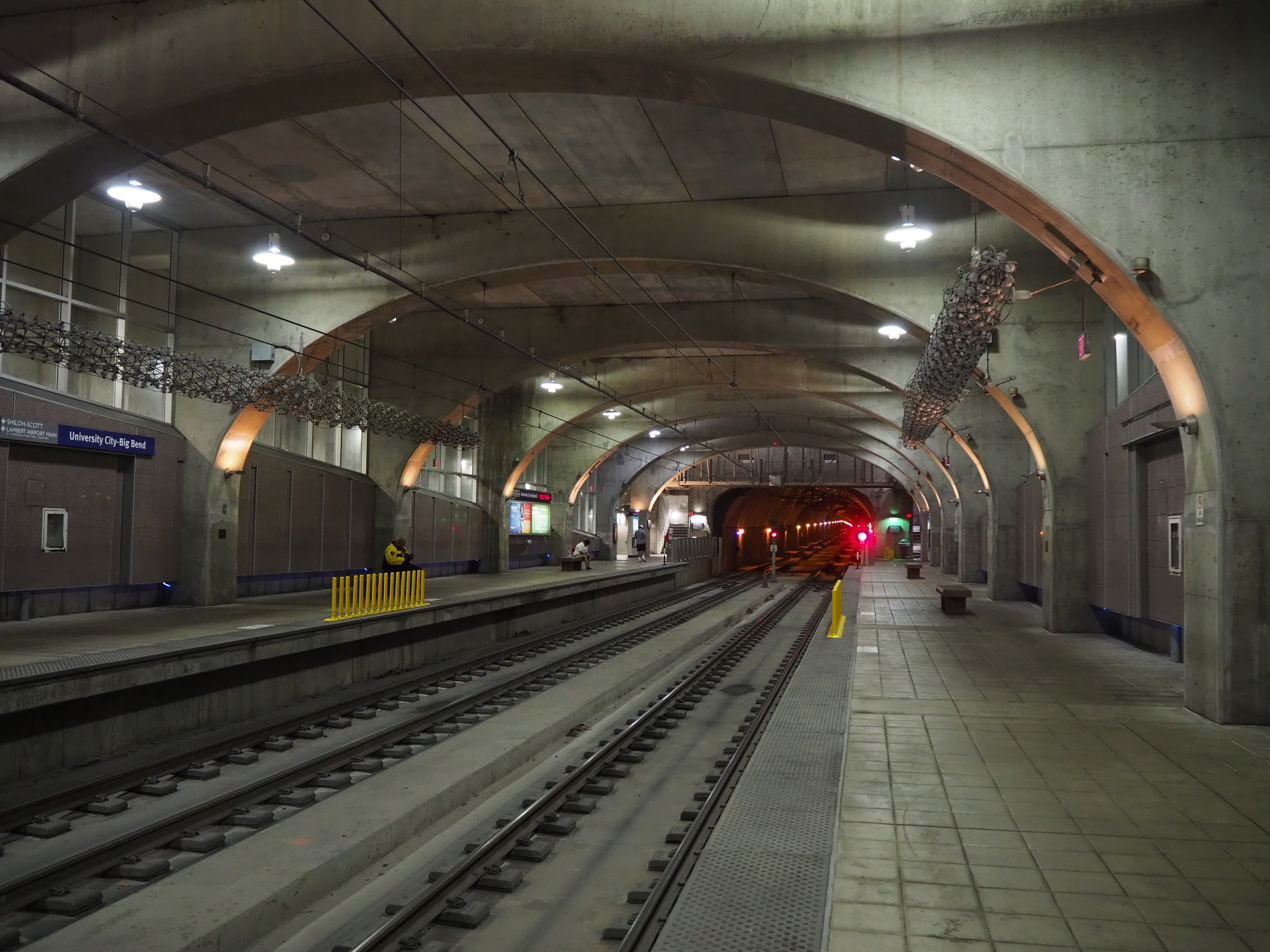
University City–Big Bend station along the Cross County extension, now Blue Line.

The 8-mile (12.9 km) Cross County Extension opened on August 26, 2006, and added nine stations from Forest Park-DeBaliviere to Shrewsbury, Missouri. Intermediate stops include service to Washington University, Clayton, the Saint Louis Galleria and Maplewood. The entire project was funded by a $430 million Metro bond issue. Citing repeated delays and cost overruns, Metro fired and then sued its general contractor, Cross County Collaborative, in the summer of 2004. Metro sought $81 million in damages for fraud and mismanagement while the Collaborative counter-sued for $17 million for work that Metro hadn't paid for. On December 1, 2007, a jury awarded the Collaborative $2.56 million.

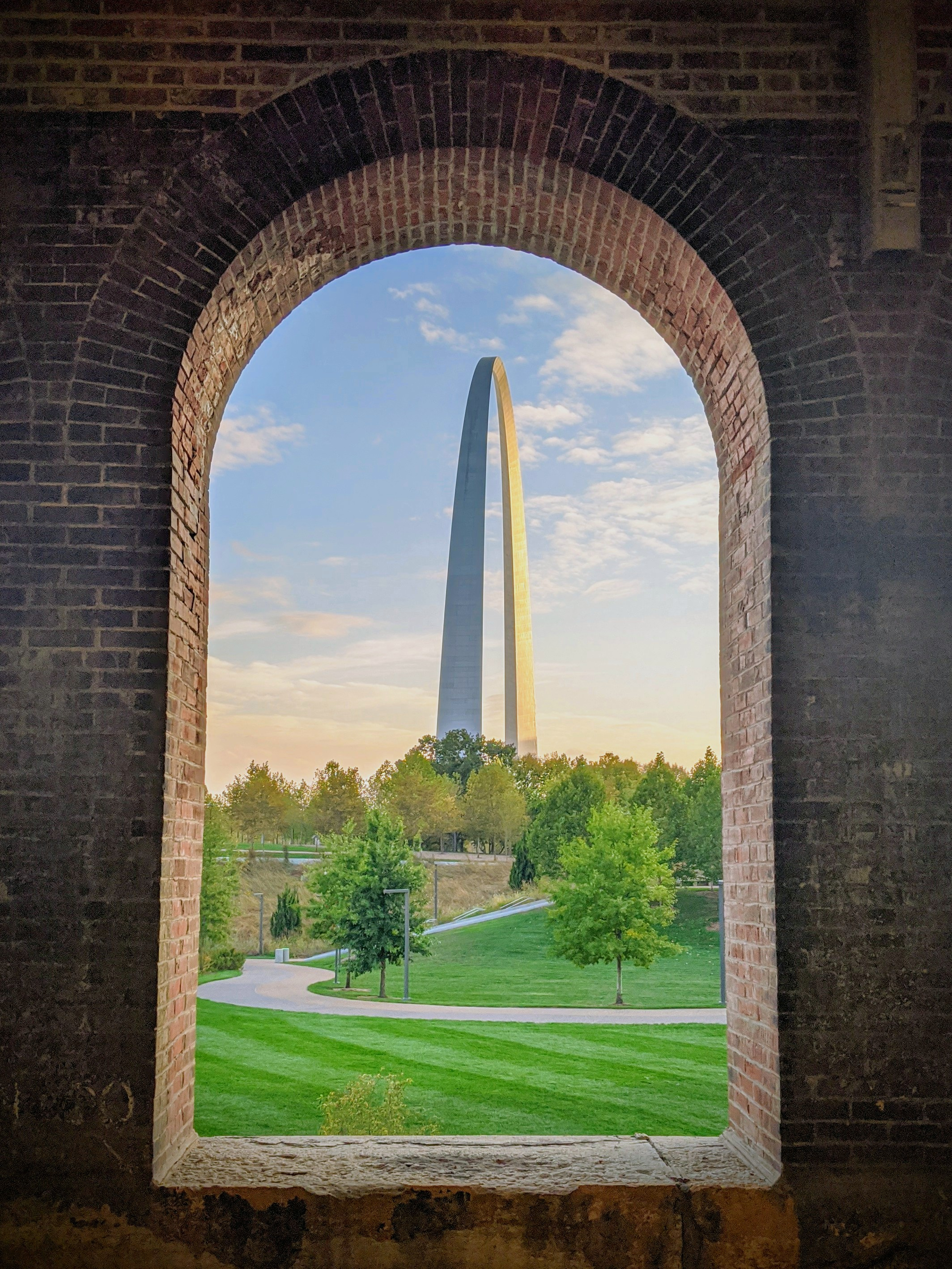
The Gateway Arch seen from the Laclede's Landing platform.

On October 27, 2008, Metro renamed the Lambert Airport branch the Red Line and the Shrewsbury branch the Blue Line. Blue Line service was also extended from its former terminus at Emerson Park to Fairview Heights. All trains have signs on the front and side that identify the train as a Red or Blue line train, and operators make live announcements identifying lines and stations.

On September 9, 2014, the United States Department of Transportation announced $10.3 million in funding for a new Metrolink station between the Central West End and Grand stations in the Cortex Innovation Community. An additional $5 million in funding was provided by a public-private partnership including Washington University, BJC HealthCare, Great Rivers Greenway and Cortex. The new Cortex station, located just east of Boyle Avenue, opened to the public on July 31, 2018.

On June 15, 2019, MetroLink set its single-day ridership record when more than 100,000 people used the service to attend the parade after the St. Louis Blues won the 2019 Stanley Cup playoffs.

On July 26, 2022, a flash flood shut down MetroLink for nearly 72 hours and caused roughly $40 million in damage. The flood damaged nearly 5 miles (8.0 km) of track bed, two elevators, two communications rooms, three signal houses and destroyed two MetroLink vehicles. Normal Red Line service resumed in September, but Blue Line service would run under restrictions for nearly two years. On July 31, 2023, Metro received $27.7 million in federal emergency disaster relief funding to help cover the cost of restoration. In March 2024, Blue Line platform and speed restrictions were lifted after repairs on the last signal house were completed.

In May, Metro received a $196.2 million federal grant to purchase new light rail vehicles to replace the remaining SD-400 cars. Six months later, Bi-State's board approved a contract with Siemens Mobility worth up to $390.4 million for as many as 55 new S200 light rail vehicles with delivery expected to begin in 2027.

In September 2024, turnstiles began initial operation at four Illinois stations as part of Metro's Secure Platform Plan. Seven Missouri stations are slated for completion by early 2025 with the remaining stations and an upgraded fare collection system expected to be in place by early 2026.

=== Chronology ===
Opening dates of MetroLink segments and stations:

Opening date	Element	Stations	Length
July 31, 1993	Line between North Hanley and 5th & Missouri	16	13.9 mi (22.4 km)
May 14, 1994	East Riverfront (infill station)	1	—
June 25, 1994	Extension to Lambert Airport Main	1	3.15 mi (5.1 km)
December 23, 1998	Lambert Airport East (infill station)	1	—
May 5, 2001	Extension to College	8	17.4 mi (28 km)
June 23, 2003	Extension to Shiloh-Scott	1	3.5 mi (5.6 km)
August 26, 2006	Extension to Shrewsbury-Lansdowne I-44	9	8 mi (13 km)
July 31, 2018	Cortex (infill station)	1	—
	Total	38	46 mi (74 km)

== Lines ==
=== Red Line ===
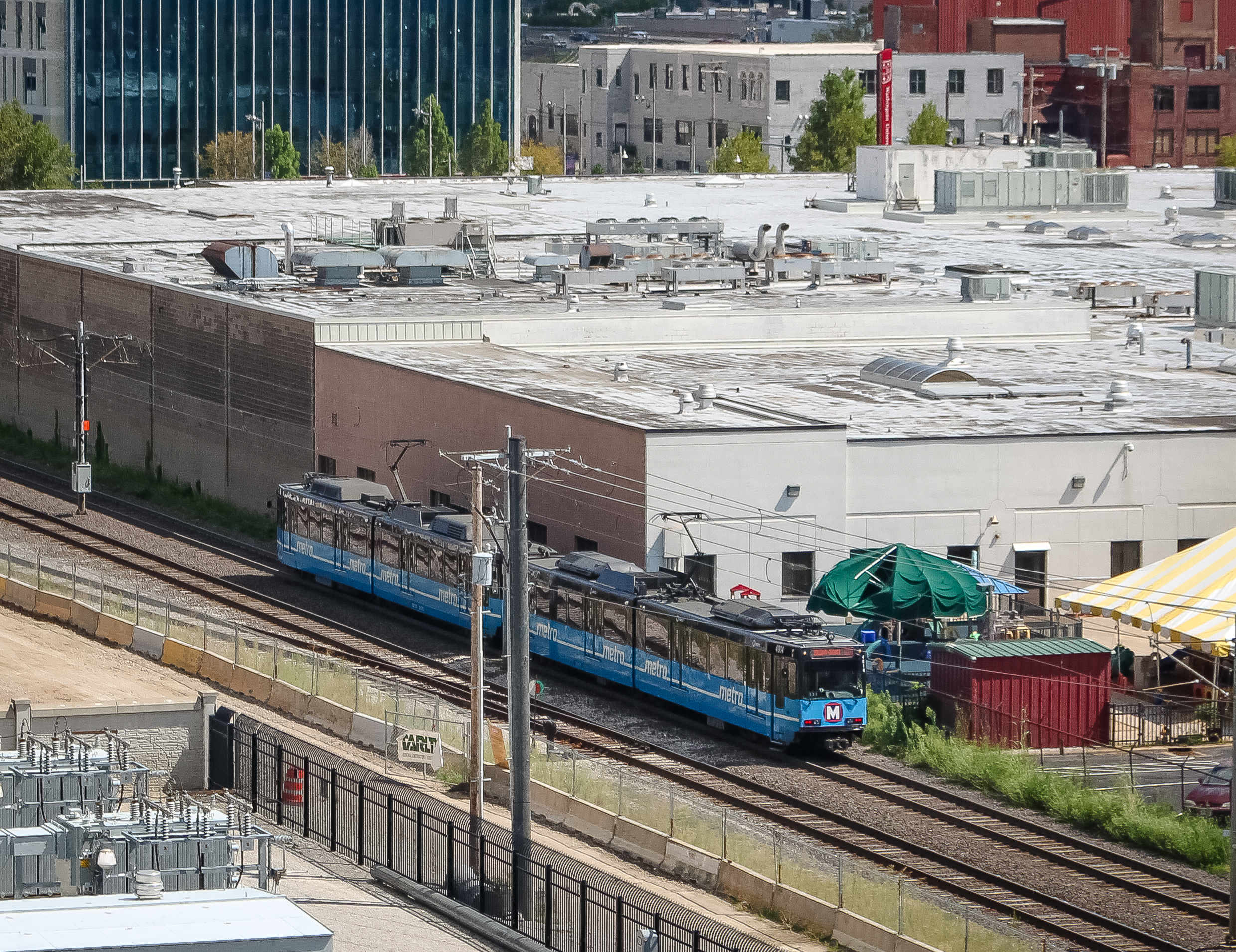
A Red Line train traveling through the Central West End

The 38-mile (61 km) Red Line begins at St. Louis Lambert International Airport, making stops at the Terminal 1 and Terminal 2 stations. It proceeds through Kinloch, then stops at the North Hanley station near Bel-Ridge. It makes two stops (UMSL North & UMSL South) at the University of Missouri St. Louis in Normandy. After UMSL, trains run on the old Wabash/Norfolk & Western Railroad's Union Depot line that once brought passenger trains from Ferguson to Union Station. Traveling into Pagedale, it stops at the Rock Road station and then at Wellston's namesake station on Plymouth Street. Entering St. Louis City at Skinker Boulevard, the line stops at the Delmar Loop station and its namesake entertainment district. At the following station, Forest Park-DeBaliviere, the Red Line meets the Blue Line; the lines then share tracks until the Blue Line terminates at the Fairview Heights station in Illinois.

=== Blue Line ===
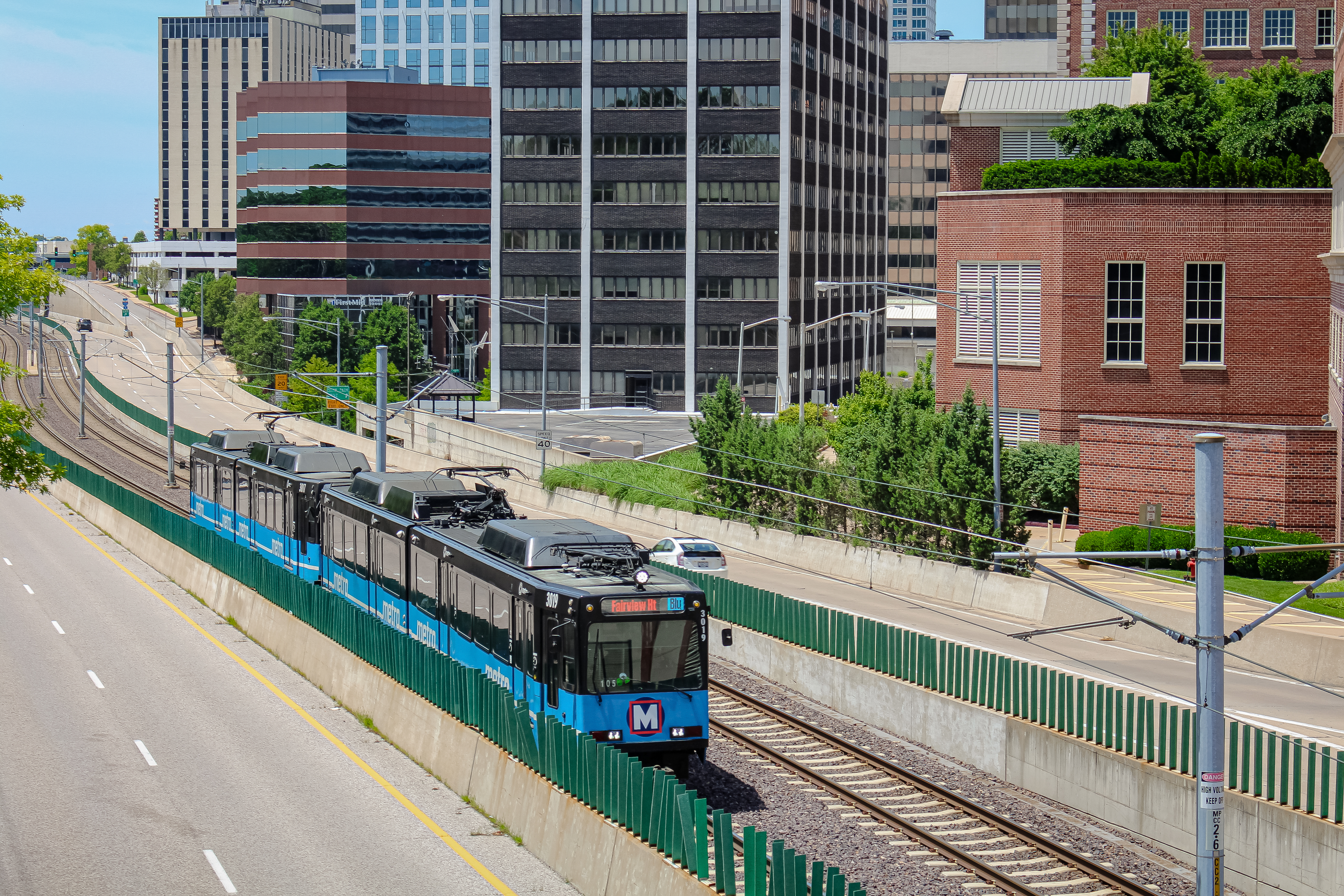
A Blue Line train traveling through downtown Clayton

The 24-mile (38.6 km) Blue Line alignment starts at the Shrewsbury-Lansdowne I-44 station in Shrewsbury, just west of the River des Peres. It crosses over Interstate 44 and continues north to two stations in Maplewood, Missouri (Sunnen and Maplewood/Manchester). The line continues north to the Brentwood I-64 station in Brentwood, Missouri, just south of Interstate 64. It then proceeds in a tunnel underneath Interstate 64, continuing to the Richmond Heights station, which serves the Saint Louis Galleria shopping mall. The line then proceeds through a sharp turn east to the Clayton station in the median of Forest Park Parkway in Clayton, Missouri, where it serves the Central Business District of St. Louis County. It heads east to the Forsyth station where it enters a tunnel to the University City-Big Bend subway station. After crossing the St. Louis City/County boundary, the Blue Line stops at the Skinker subway station, the last stop serving nearby Washington University. At the following station, Forest Park-DeBaliviere, the Blue Line meets the Red Line. From this station, the two services share track until the Blue Line terminates at the Fairview Heights station in Illinois.

=== Shared alignment ===
In all, the Red and Blue lines share tracks for 16 stations. From west to east: the Central West End and Cortex stations that serve the Central West End neighborhood, Washington University Medical Center, and Cortex Innovation Community. The Grand station transfers with the busy #70 MetroBus line and serves Saint Louis University and its hospital. Next, the Union Station, Civic Center, Stadium, 8th & Pine, Convention Center, and Laclede's Landing stations serve downtown St. Louis and its many destinations. Crossing the historic Eads Bridge into Illinois, the line serves the East Riverfront, 5th & Missouri, Emerson Park, Jackie Joyner-Kersee Center, and Washington Park stations in East St. Louis, Illinois. At the next station, Fairview Heights, the Blue Line ends. The Red Line continues south through Belleville, Illinois, to its terminus at the Shiloh–Scott station near Scott Air Force Base.

== Rolling stock ==
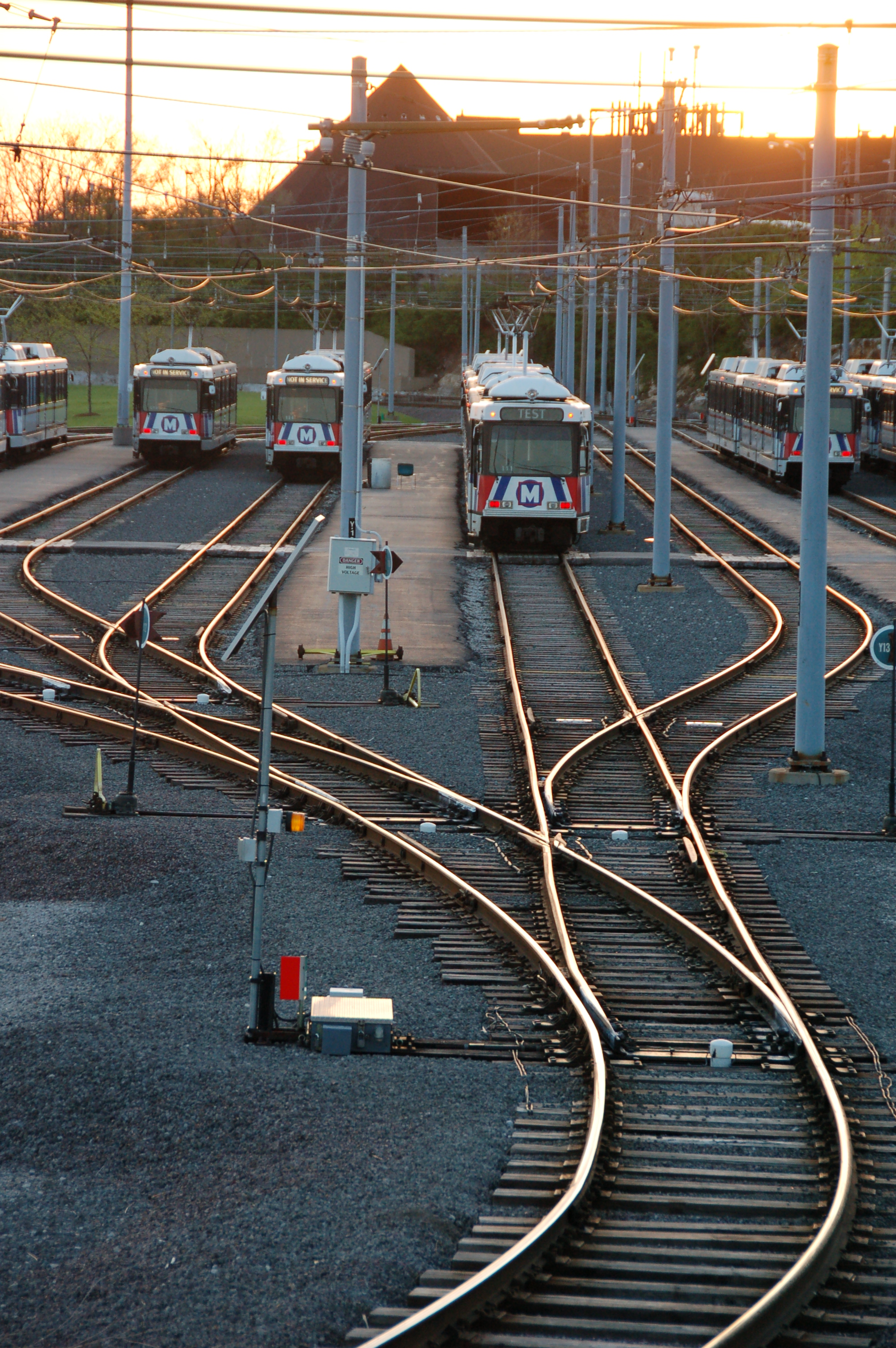
Ewing Yard and Shops

MetroLink operates 87 Siemens SD-400 and SD-460 light rail vehicles (LRVs). Each 90-foot-long (27 m), single articulated vehicle has four high-platform doors per side and can hold 72 seated and 106 standing passengers. The cars are powered by an electric motor which gets its electricity from an overhead line with a 750 V DC supply.

Each car is bi-directional (also known as "double-ended"), meaning it has an enclosed operator cab at each end. This configuration is the most flexible for operations but prevents travel between cars. Bicycles are permitted in the door vestibules adjacent to each unused cab. Each car has separate doors for boarding at station level and track level; in normal operations, the track-level doors (equipped with stairs) are unused.

A new paint scheme of blue and black was adopted in 2019, and repainting or wrapping of the entire active fleet in the new colors was completed in August 2025. All LRVs were originally equipped with rollsigns – roll-type destination signs – in which the background color (blue or red) indicated the route, but all of the SD-460 cars were converted to LED-type destination signs between October 2021 and July 2023, leaving only the 18 remaining SD-400 cars with rollsigns.

By 2025, 13 of the SD-400 cars had been retired. Metro plans to begin phasing out the remaining 18 SD-400 cars and to refurbish the SD-460 cars for continued use. In May 2023, Metro received a $196.2 million federal grant to purchase up to 48 Siemens S200 high-floor light rail vehicles to replace 25 of the oldest cars. Six months later, Bi-State's board approved a contract with Siemens Mobility worth up to $390.4 million for as many as 55 new light rail vehicles. The initial order, awarded in November 2023, was for 24 LRVs; by 2025, it had been increased to the full 55 vehicles. The first car is expected to arrive in early 2027.

Metro operates two storage and maintenance facilities. Ewing Yard sits between the Grand and Union Station stops just west of downtown St. Louis; 29th Street Yard is located between the JJK Center and Washington Park stops in East St. Louis.

=== Roster ===
Unit Type	Year built	Quantity	Image	Numbers
Siemens SD-400	1991–1993	31	A Red Line train of Siemens SD-400s at Central West End Station.	1001–1031
Siemens SD-460	1999	10	A Blue Line train of Siemens SD-460 Light Rail Vehicles at Cortex station.	2001–2010
Siemens SD-460	2000	24	A Blue Line train of Siemens SD-460 Light Rail Vehicles at Cortex station.	3001–3024
Siemens SD-460	2004–2005	22	A Blue Line train of Siemens SD-460 Light Rail Vehicles at Cortex station.	4001–4022
Siemens S200	Deliveries to begin in 2027	55		(5001–5055)

== Fares ==
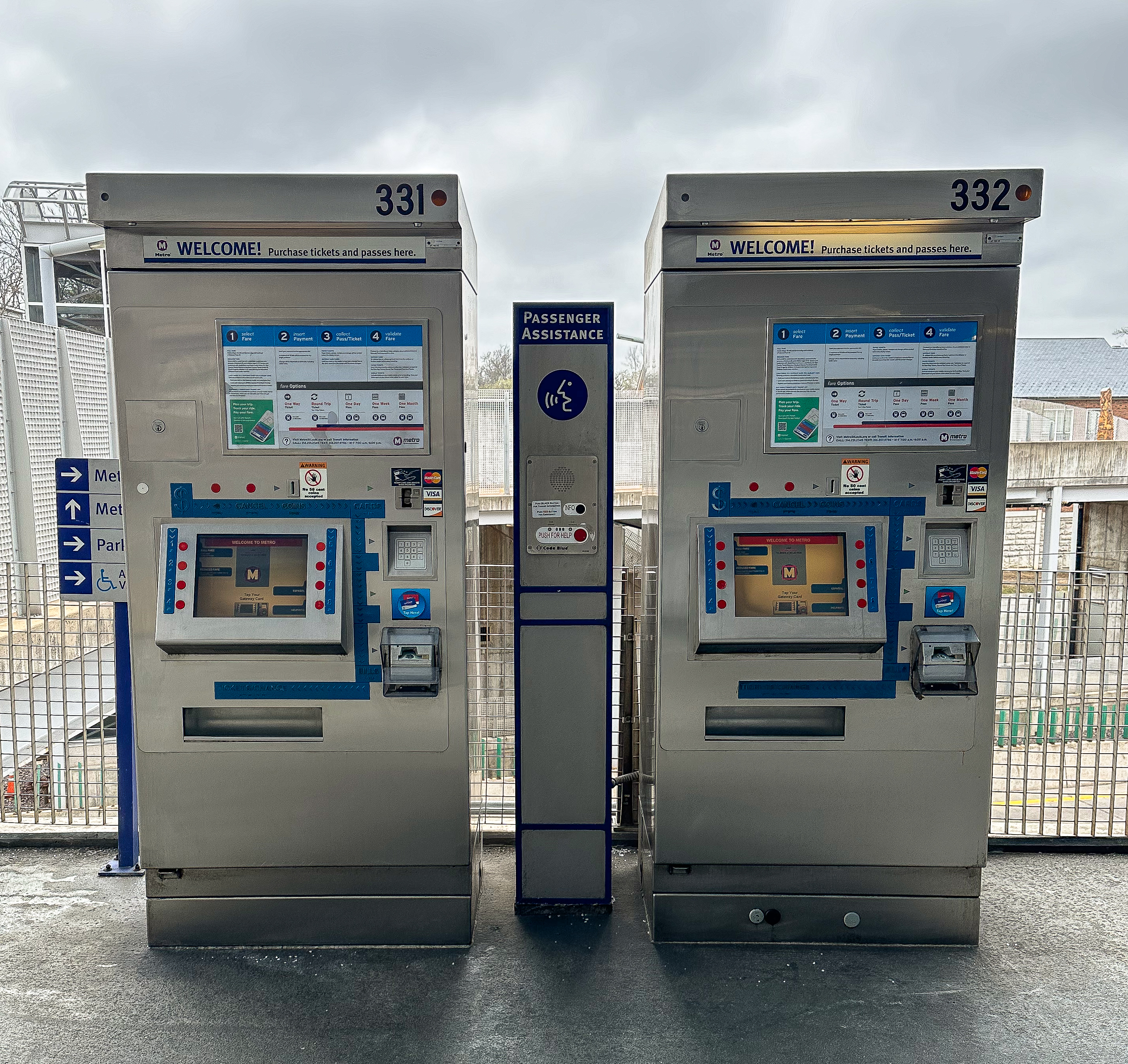
Ticket vending machines at Clayton in 2024

MetroLink uses turnstile gates with fare validators to limit access to the paid area of stations to passengers with tickets and other forms of payment. The gates were installed in the 2020s to replace the previous proof-of-payment system. Tickets can be purchased at ticket-vending machines at the entrance to all stations and must be validated before boarding the train. Single-ride tickets are good for up to two hours in the direction that a passenger initially boards. Some fares, such as monthly or weekly fares, do not need to be validated, but passengers must have the pass in their possession while riding and must show the pass to security personnel upon request. Reduced fares can be purchased by seniors ages 65+, people with disabilities, and children ages 5–12. Up to three children under 5 may ride free with a fare-paying rider. Proof of age may be requested of all people riding with reduced fares. Other types of passes include a Semester Pass for full-time students.

In 2018, Metro introduced the Gateway Card, a multi-use smart card that was intended to eliminate most paper passes and tickets. In 2023, Metro announced that it would replace the Gateway Card—one Bi-State official called it a "failed system"—with a new fare collection system as part of the Secure Platform Plan.

As of 2024, the base fare is $2.50 when paid in cash or $3 for a two-hour pass with a transfer that can be purchased on the Transit app.

== Projects in progress ==
=== MidAmerica Airport extension ===
In 2019, the St. Clair County Transit District was awarded $96 million in Illinois infrastructure funding to build a 5.2-mile (8.4 km) extension of the Red Line from Shiloh–Scott to MidAmerica St. Louis Airport in Mascoutah. This extension will include two 2.6-mile (4.2 km) segments, a double-track and a single-track segment, along with a station at the airport. Construction of the extension began in 2023, and its opening is forecast for the summer of 2026.The extension was finished on the 5th of October 2026, with revenue service expecting to start in the coming months after on-track testing.

=== System rehabilitation ===
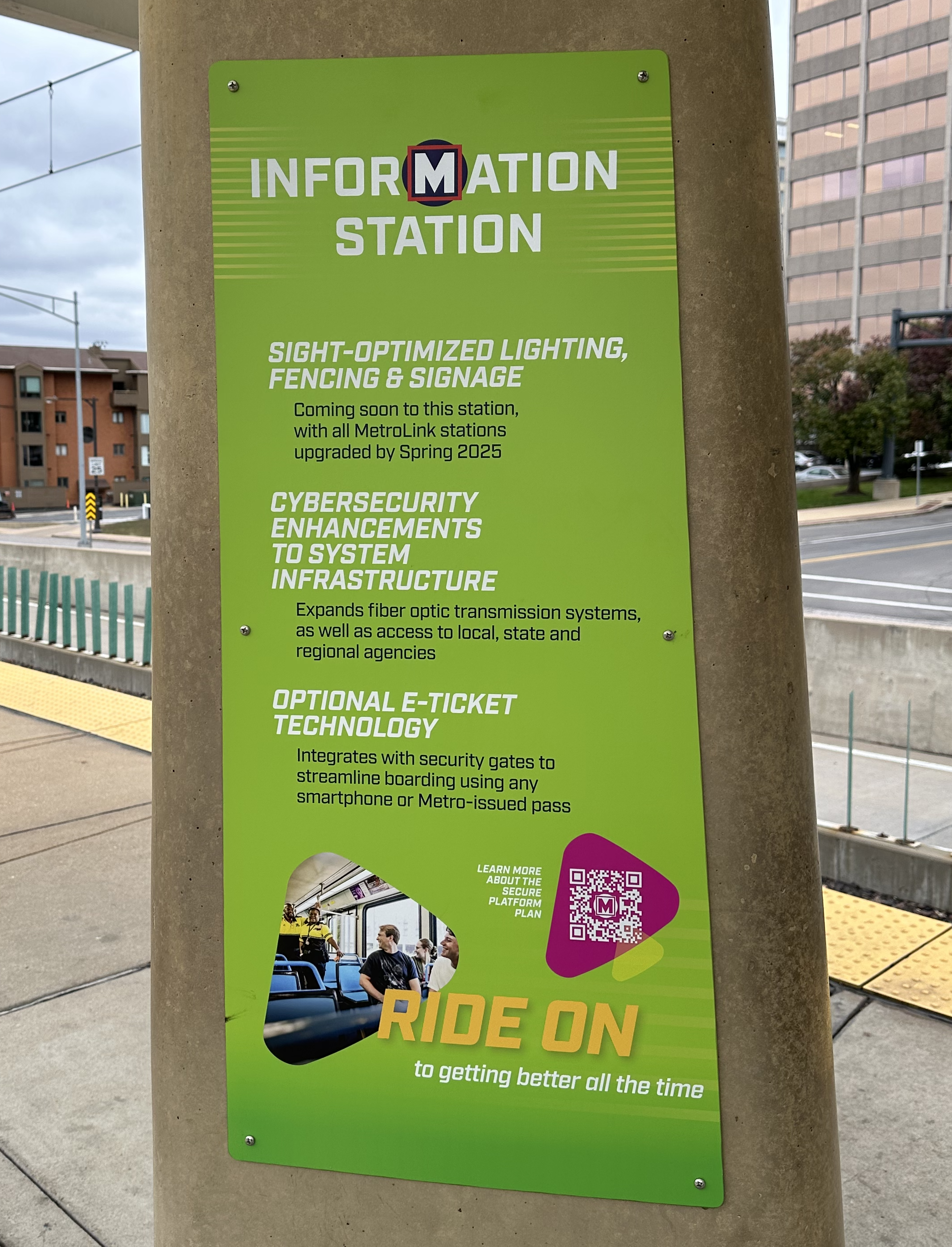
A sign at Clayton detailing upcoming station work in 2024

In 2023, Metro began a system-wide rehabilitation program that will last several years. That spring, Metro began rehabilitating the downtown subway tunnels, including the Laclede's Landing, Convention Center, and 8th & Pine stations. Elsewhere, catenary wire, curve tracks, platforms, retaining walls, staircases, and system conduit are to be upgraded or replaced.

Beginning in 2025, Metro will start rehabilitating the Union Station tunnel with rehabilitation of the Cross County tunnels beginning in 2026. The latter will include the renovation of the Skinker and University City–Big Bend subway stations and the construction of a storage siding near the Richmond Heights station. In 2026, Metro expects to complete upgrades to the Supervisory Control Automated Data Acquisition (SCADA) and Public Address/Customer Information (PA/CIS) systems. The upgraded SCADA/PA/CIS will operate as an integrated system that monitors and controls operations and will allow Metro to provide real-time arrival information to passengers, such as live displays at stations.

=== Secure Platform Plan ===
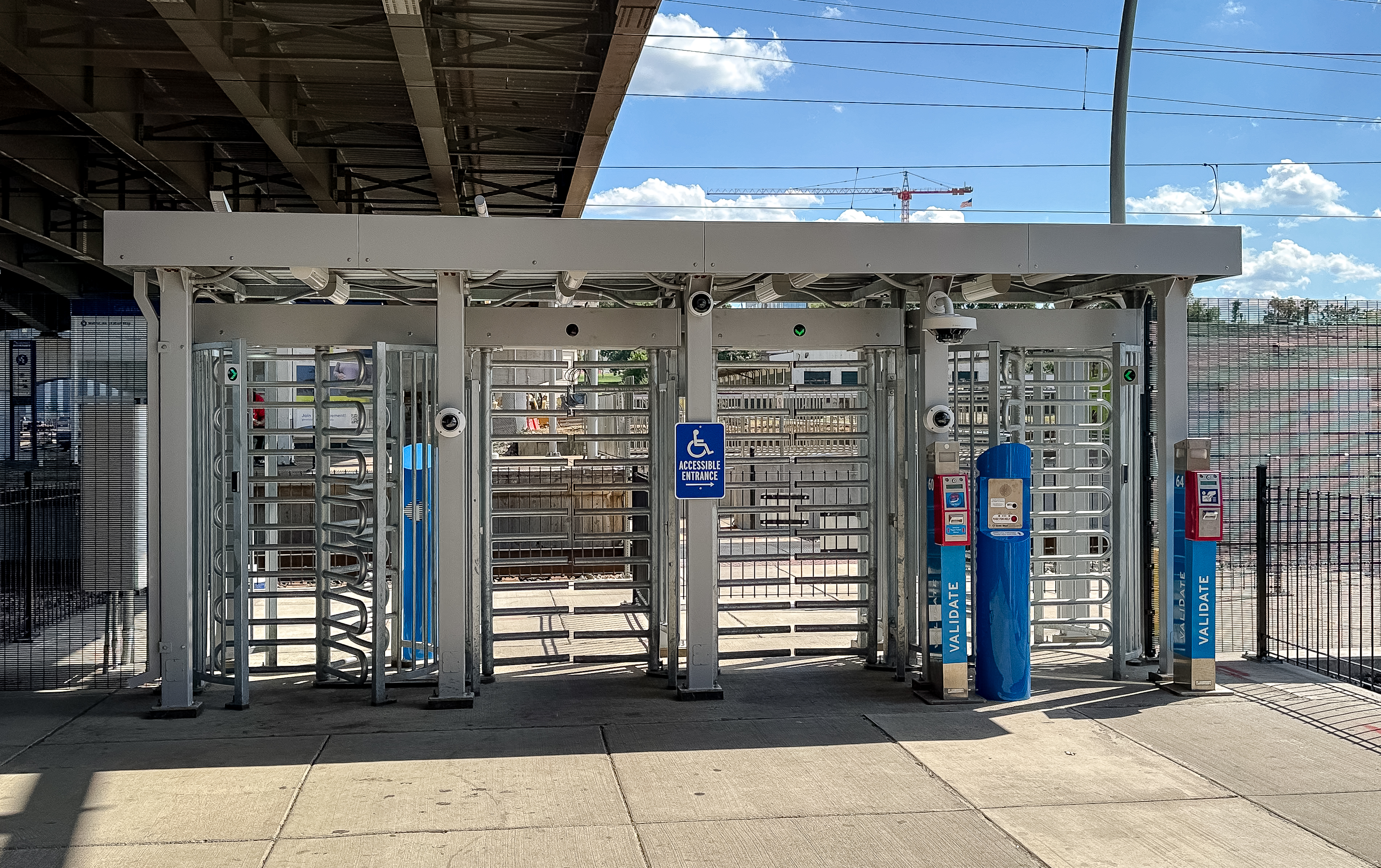
Gates installed as part of the Secure Platform Plan at Grand station

In 2024, Metro Transit began adding turnstiles at all MetroLink stations as part of its $52 million Secure Platform Plan (SPP). Stations will also receive a new fare collection system, more fences, passenger-assist telephones, and more than 1,800 cameras to be monitored at a center opened in November 2022 at Metro's Central Garage.

The SPP will be implemented in three "packages" with full operation expected to begin in 2026. In September 2023, Bi-State awarded a $6.4 million contract to Millstone Weber LLC for the first package covering four Illinois stations. The gates at these first four stations began operating in September 2024. However, due to delays in implementing a new fare collection system, Metro staff will operate the fare gates manually at first. The second package covers seven Missouri stations and is also slated for completion by early 2025. The remaining stations and the upgraded fare collection system are expected to be operational by early 2026.

== Projects in planning ==
=== North-South expansion ===
In 2022, Metro proposed the Green Line, a north–south on-street light rail line that would have lacked the rapid transit-like characteristics of the existing MetroLink system, instead resembling other U.S. on-street light rail lines. Running 5.6 miles (9.0 km) primarily on Jefferson Avenue, the line would have served about 10 stations between Chippewa Street in South St. Louis and Grand Boulevard in North St. Louis. The 2023 design study estimated 5,000 daily boardings, $8–9 million in annual operating costs, and $1.1 billion in capital costs.

In September 2025, Metro and St. Louis officials cancelled the Green Line project primarily due to cost concerns. That month's Bi-State Development board meeting saw commissioners vote to update the Program Management Consultant contract to evaluate alternative options for the project, with a focus on bus rapid transit. In that same meeting commissioners approved a study for bus rapid transit in the Jefferson corridor, a project that could cost between $400 and $450 million.

== Previous proposals ==
Many of these extensions were proposed between the year 2000 and in 2010 when Metro released its 30-year long range plan, Moving Transit Forward. The Green Line was cancelled in 2025.

=== North-South ===
- Northside/Southside (2008): This 21–29-mile (34–47 km) expansion was planned in two separate locally preferred alternatives (LPA). In 2008 a 12-mile (19 km) Northside LPA was selected that would have traveled between downtown St. Louis and St. Louis Community College-Florissant Valley via North City and County. That same year, a 9–17-mile (14–27 km) Southside LPA was selected that would have traveled between downtown St. Louis and Bayless Avenue via South City and County.
- Northside/Southside (2018): In 2018, an updated Northside/Southside LPA was approved that shortened the expansion to an approximately 8-mile (13 km) alignment between Grand in North St. Louis and Chippewa in South St. Louis via a loop on 9th and 10th streets in downtown St. Louis.
  Green Line project logo
- Green Line: This 5.6-mile (9.0 km) north-south expansion was announced after a design study was completed in 2023. In 2024, the East-West Gateway Council of Governments approved the updated locally preferred alternative along Jefferson Avenue. The project was cancelled in 2025 primarily due to cost concerns. An extension of the Green Line into North St. Louis County had been explored. In 2023, four alternatives were proposed that would have continued the line from the Grand/Fairground station along Natural Bridge Avenue toward the county. By 2024, County leadership had rejected all four routes primarily due to the unfunded 3-mile (4.8 km) gap between the Grand/Fairground station and the county line along with concerns about federal funding, ridership, right-of-way and other factors.

=== Cross County ===
- MetroSouth: This 6–12-mile (9.7–19.3 km) extension was envisioned as Cross County Segment 2 and would have extended the current Blue Line from its terminus in Shrewsbury further south beyond Interstates 270/255 to Butler Hill Road. A third alternative would have ended at Watson Road. An environmental impact study was completed in 2004; however, selection of an LPA was deferred due to the lack of local funding sources as well as other factors.
- MetroNorth: This approximately 12-mile (19 km) extension was envisioned as Cross County Segment 3 and would have extended the current Blue Line from Clayton towards Florissant, Missouri. Some of this segment would have followed the former Terminal Railroad Association of St. Louis' Central Belt right-of-way paralleling Interstate 170.
- Daniel Boone: This 8–10-mile (13–16 km) extension would have branched off the Cross County corridor near Olive Boulevard along disused Rock Island Railroad right-of-way. It would then turn west and follow existing trackage operated by Central Midland Railway to Page Avenue where the line would continue to Westport Plaza. An approximately 12-mile (19 km) extension to Chesterfield would have been a potential Phase 2 of the Daniel Boone branch. The alignment would have continued west following Page Avenue and Highway 364 then turning towards Creve Coeur Lake Memorial Park. From there it would have headed to Spirit of St. Louis Airport in the Chesterfield Valley. This alignment has not been given serious consideration because of its perceived low ridership potential.

=== St. Charles County ===
- A plan to expand MetroLink 16–20 miles (26–32 km) from St. Louis Lambert International Airport northwest to St. Charles County was abandoned after St. Charles County voters twice rejected a sales tax for the extension in 1996; subsequently, all MetroBus service was ended. Had the extension been funded, the route would have used the Old St. Charles Bridge (now demolished) over the Missouri River to access the county.

=== Madison County ===
- In 2005, a study was performed to analyze extending MetroLink into Madison County, Illinois. The study recommended two alignments that would have begun near the 5th & Missouri station in East St. Louis then continue through Granite City, Collinsville, Wood River, and Glen Carbon between 21–23 miles (34–37 km) away. The alignment would have split in Madison, Illinois with one branch ending in Alton and the other in Edwardsville. In order to execute any Madison County extensions, Metro would have to collaborate with Madison County Transit.

== Station gallery ==
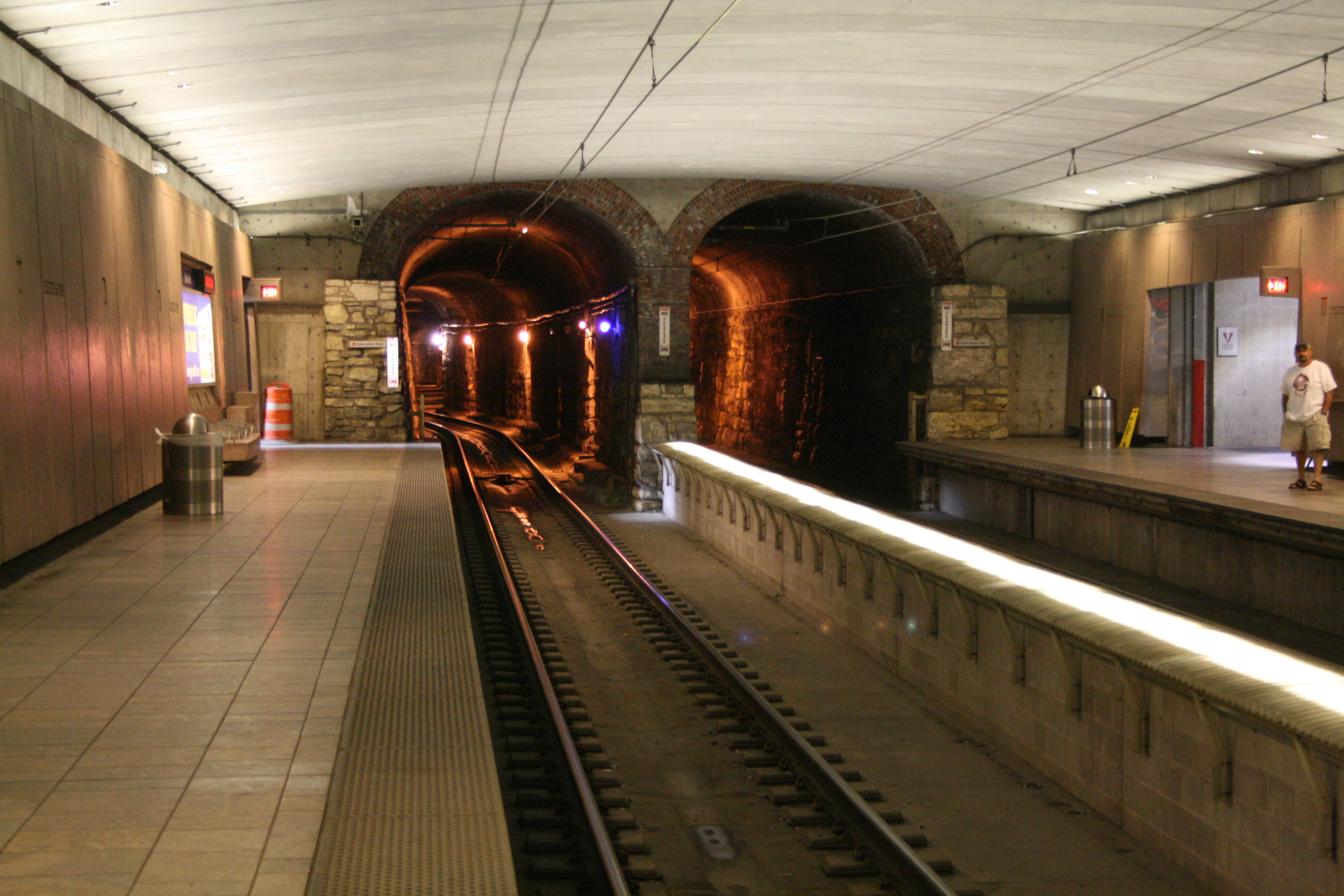
8th & Pine

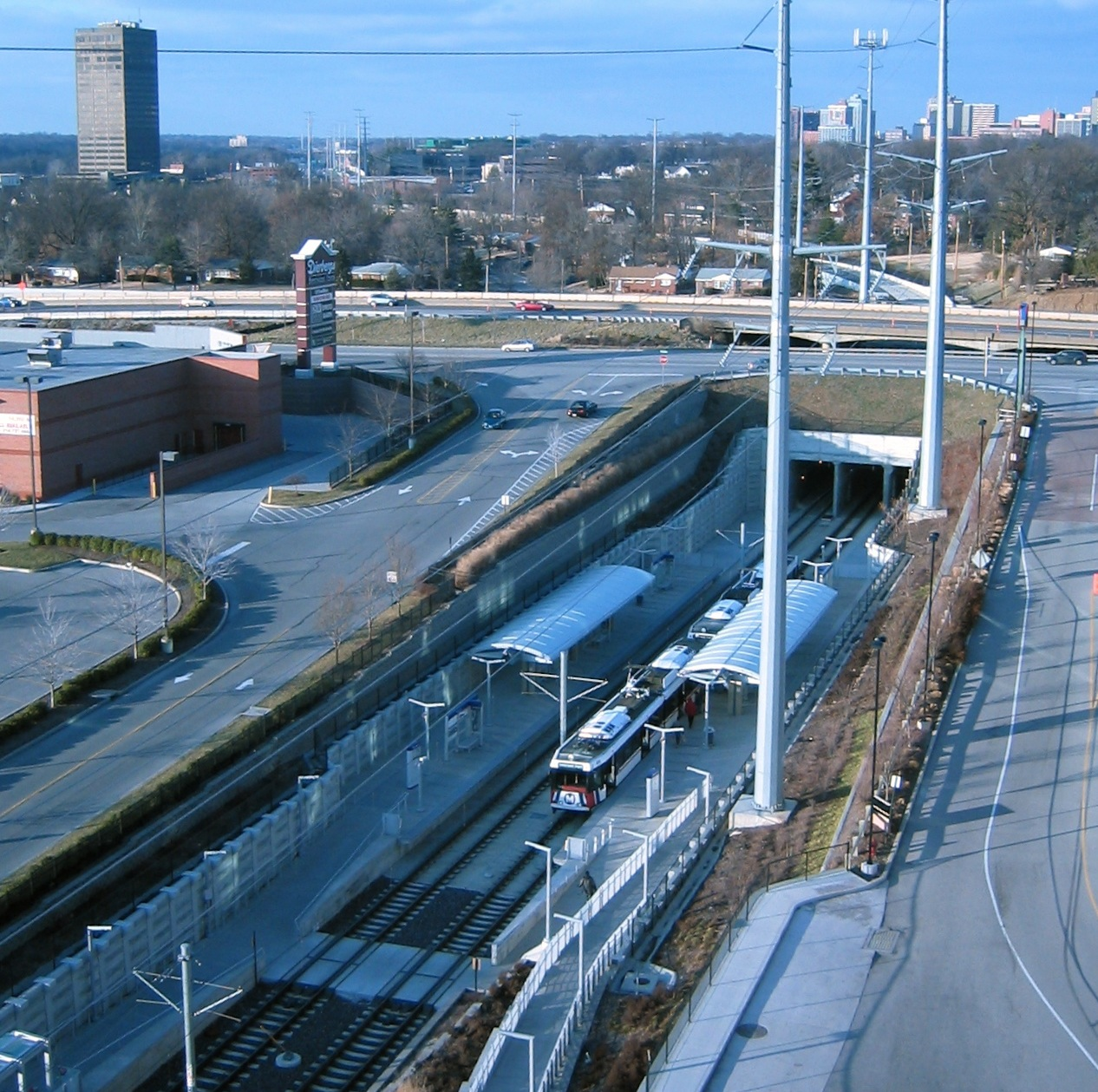
Brentwood I-64

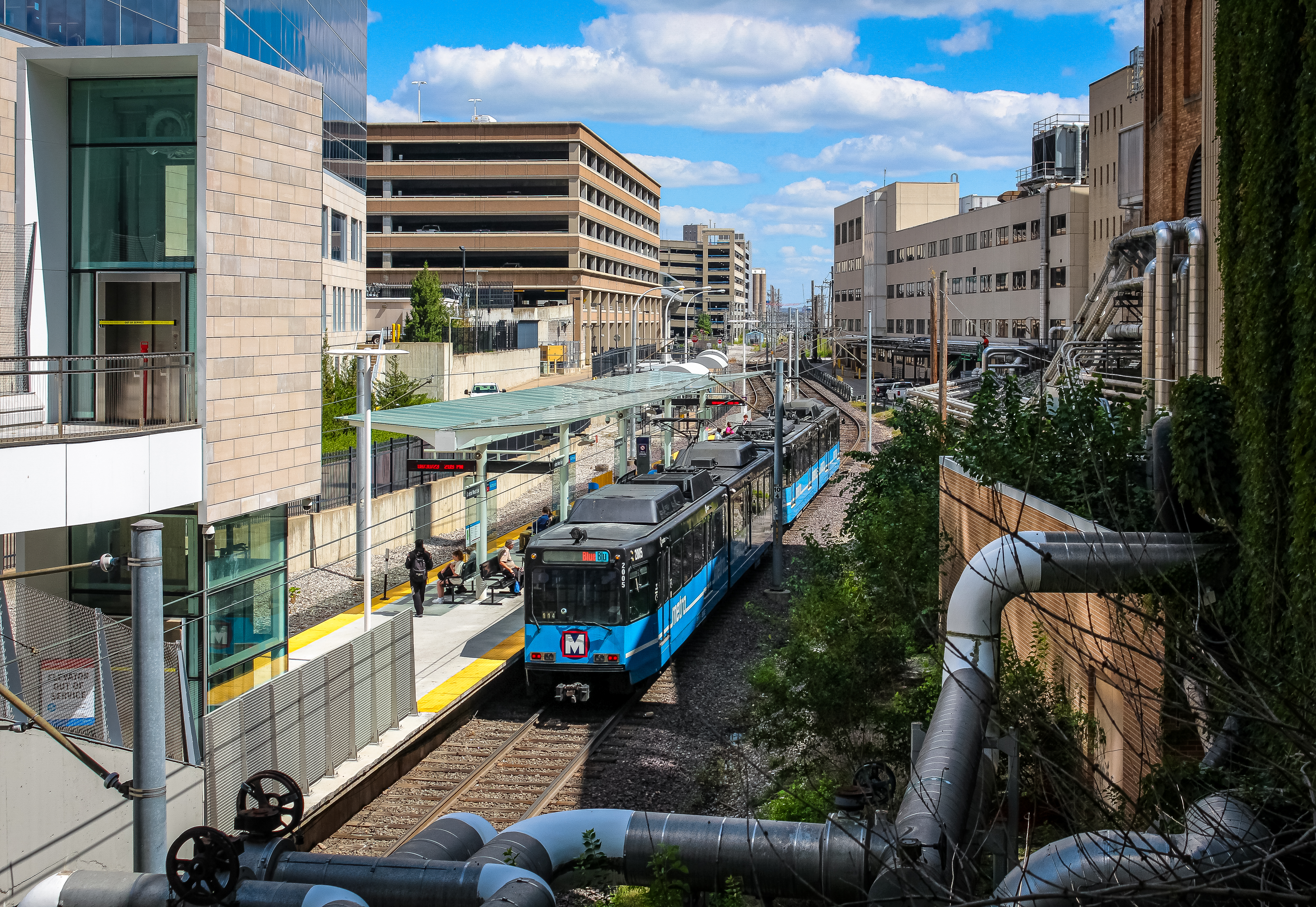
Central West End

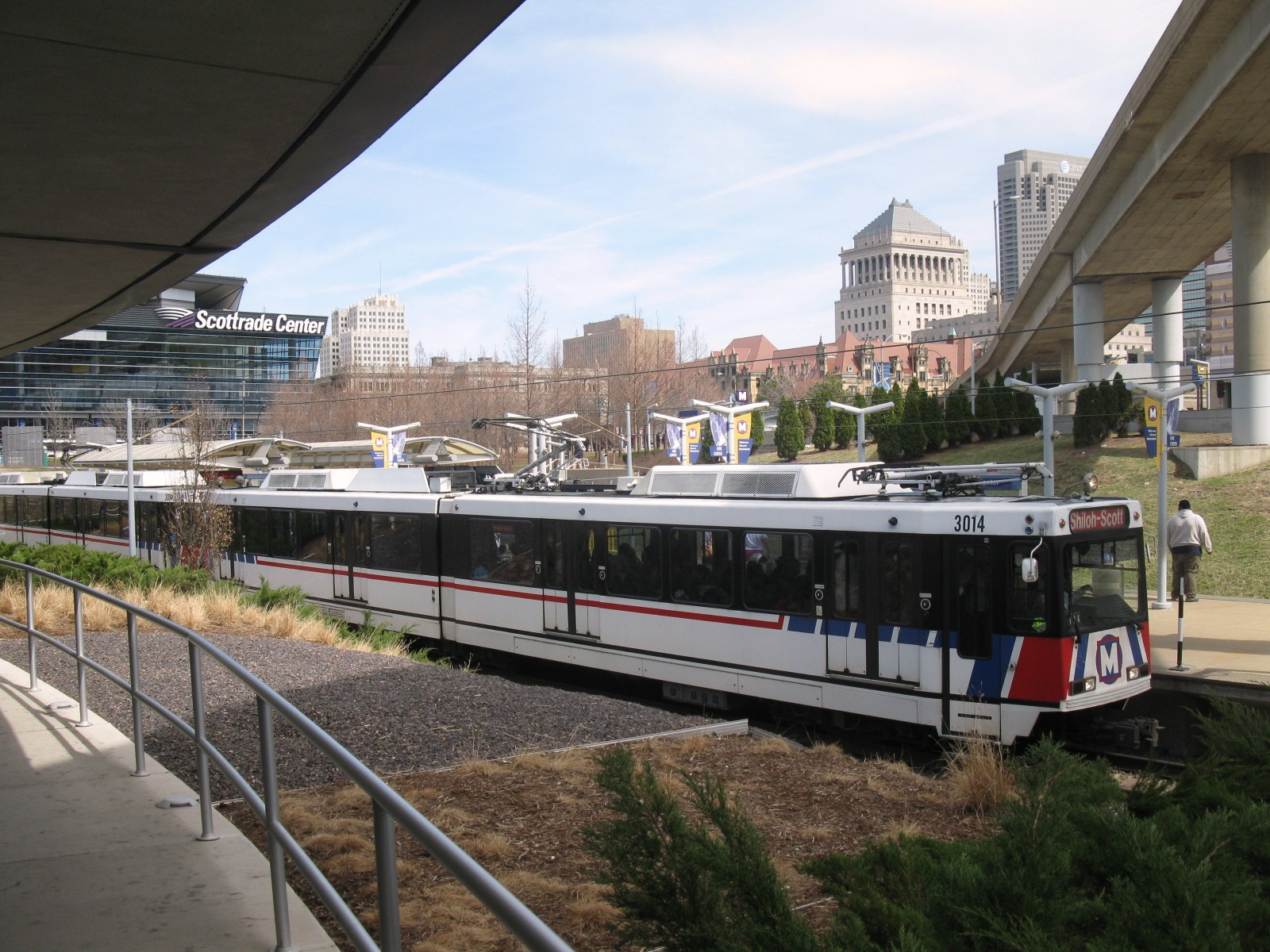
Civic Center

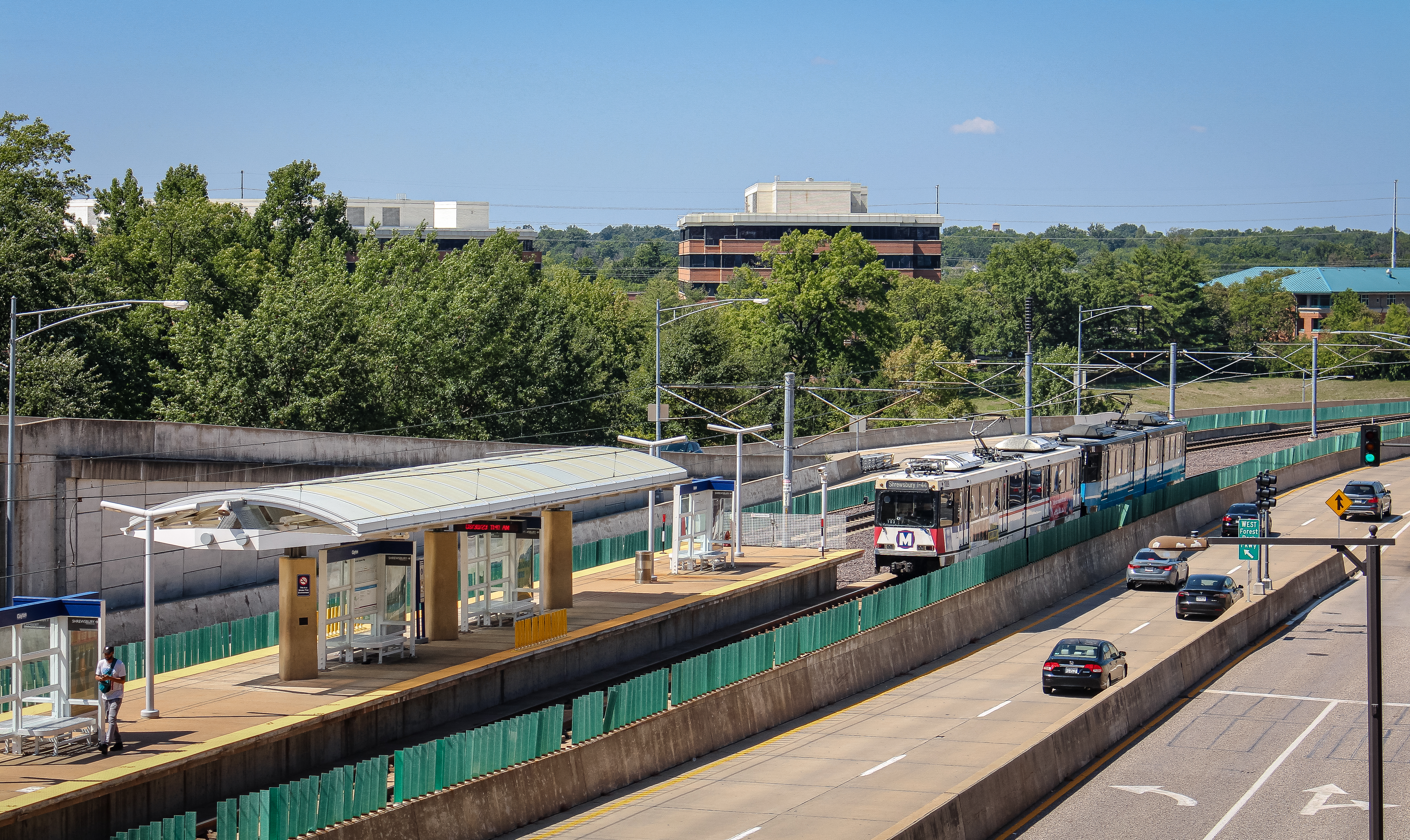
Clayton

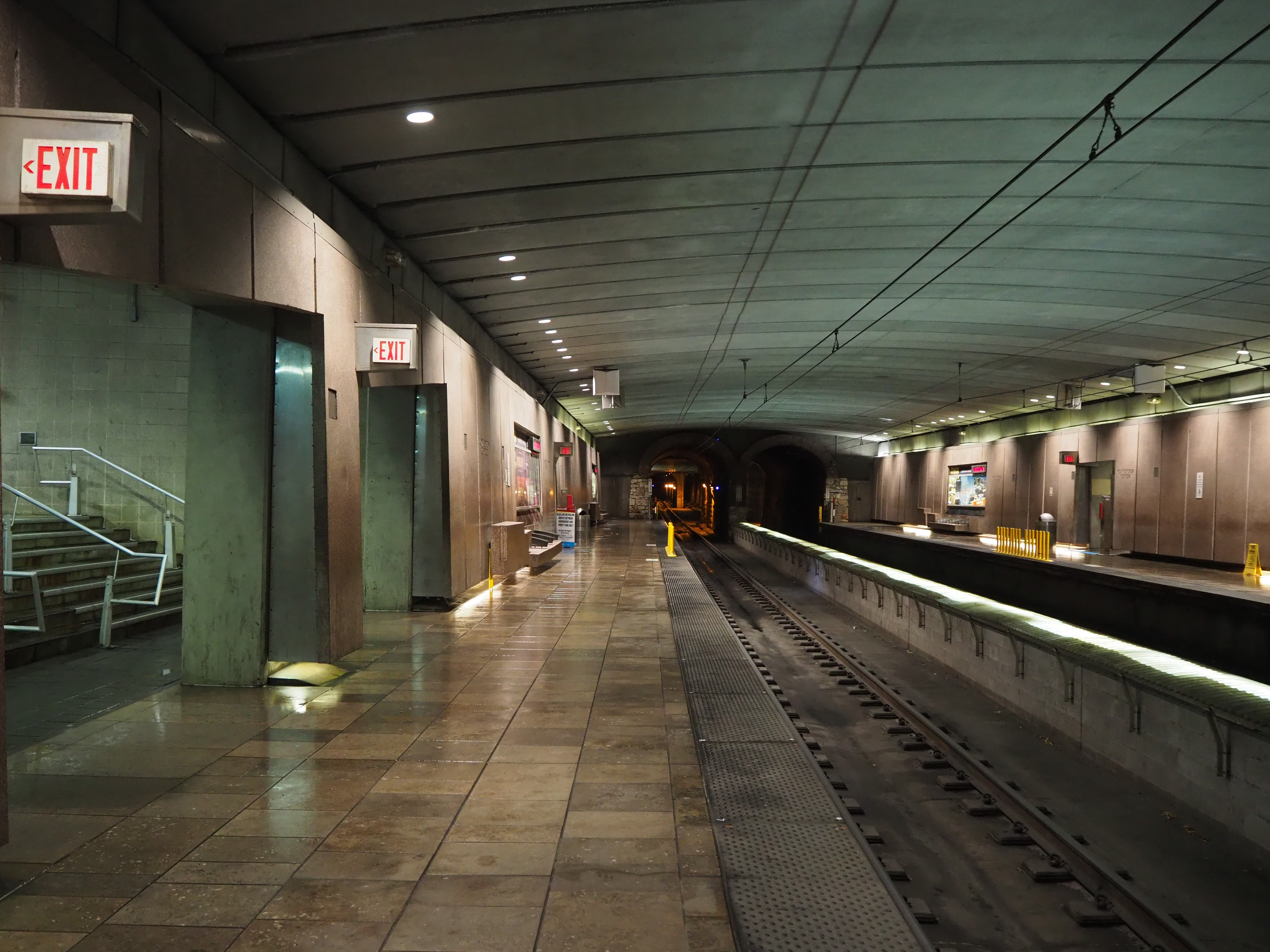
Convention Center

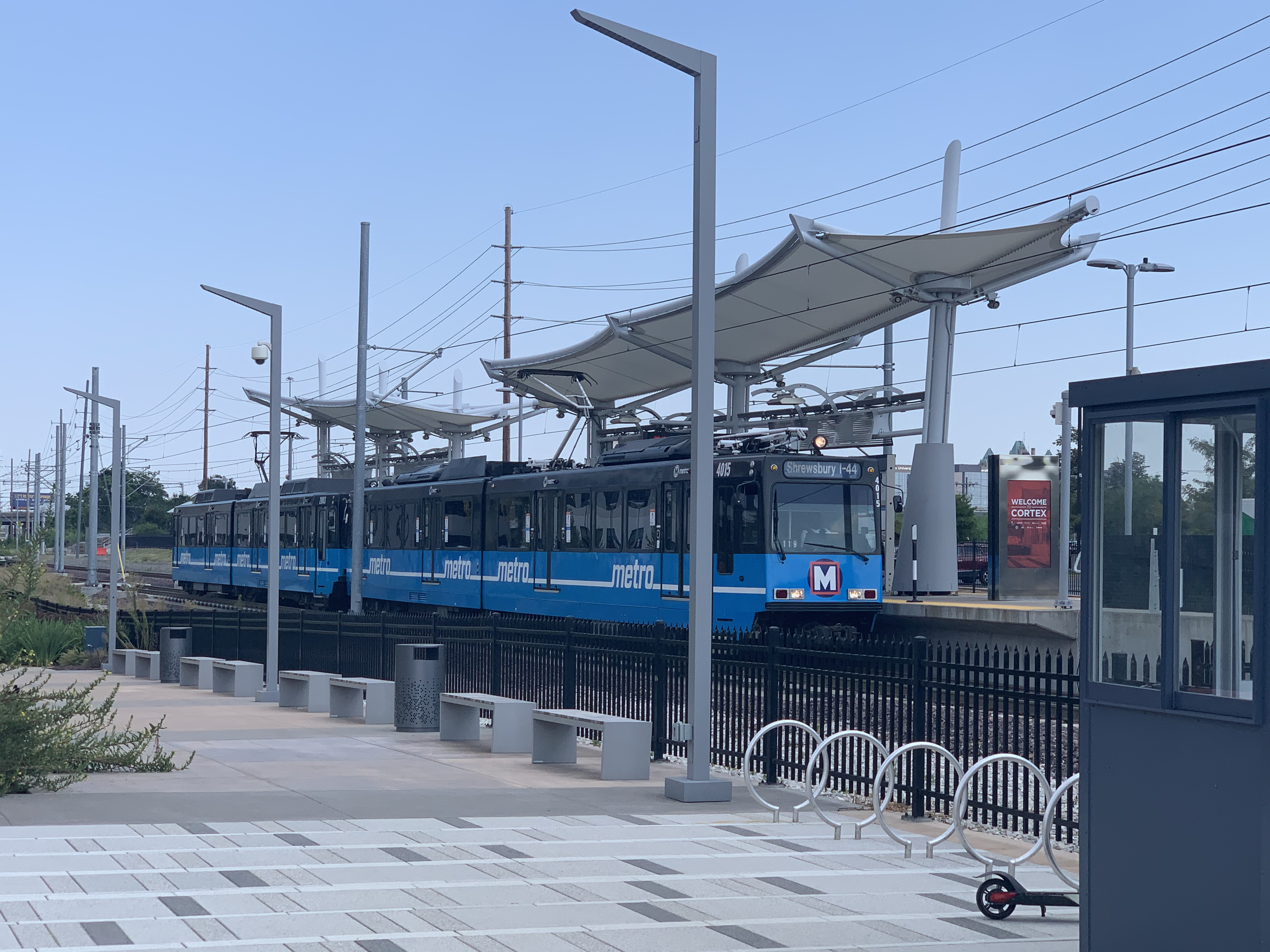
Cortex

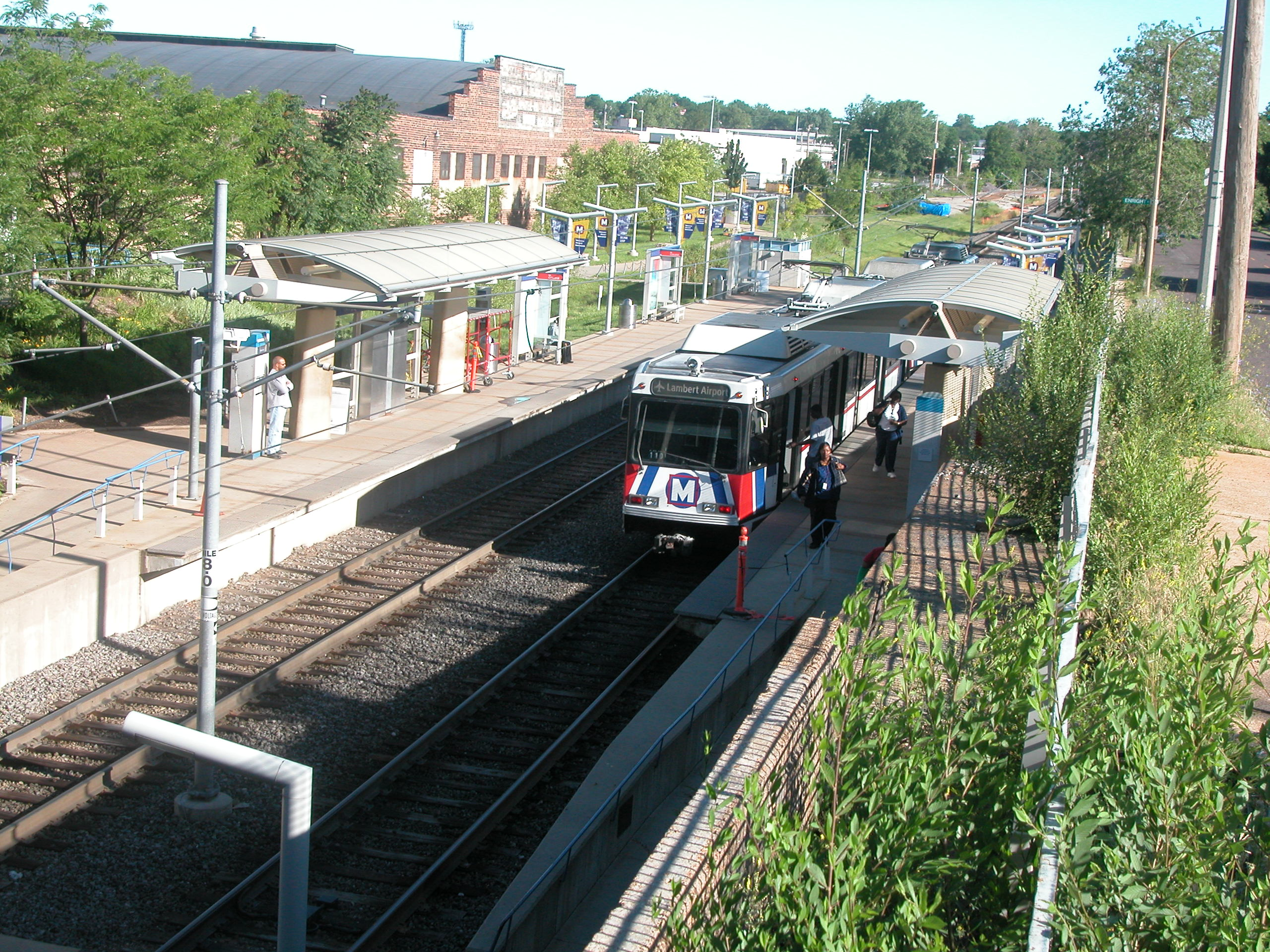
Delmar Loop

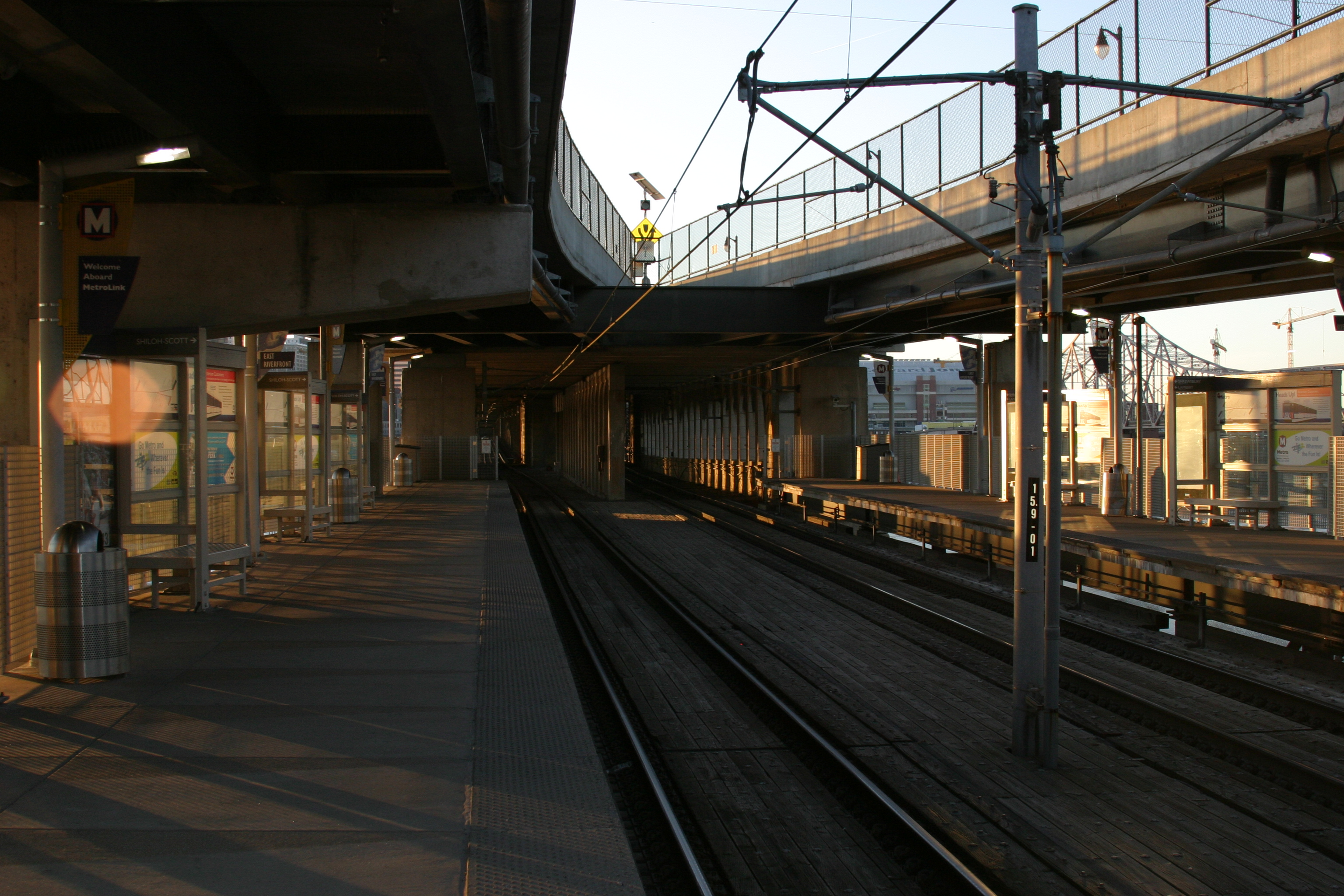
East Riverfront

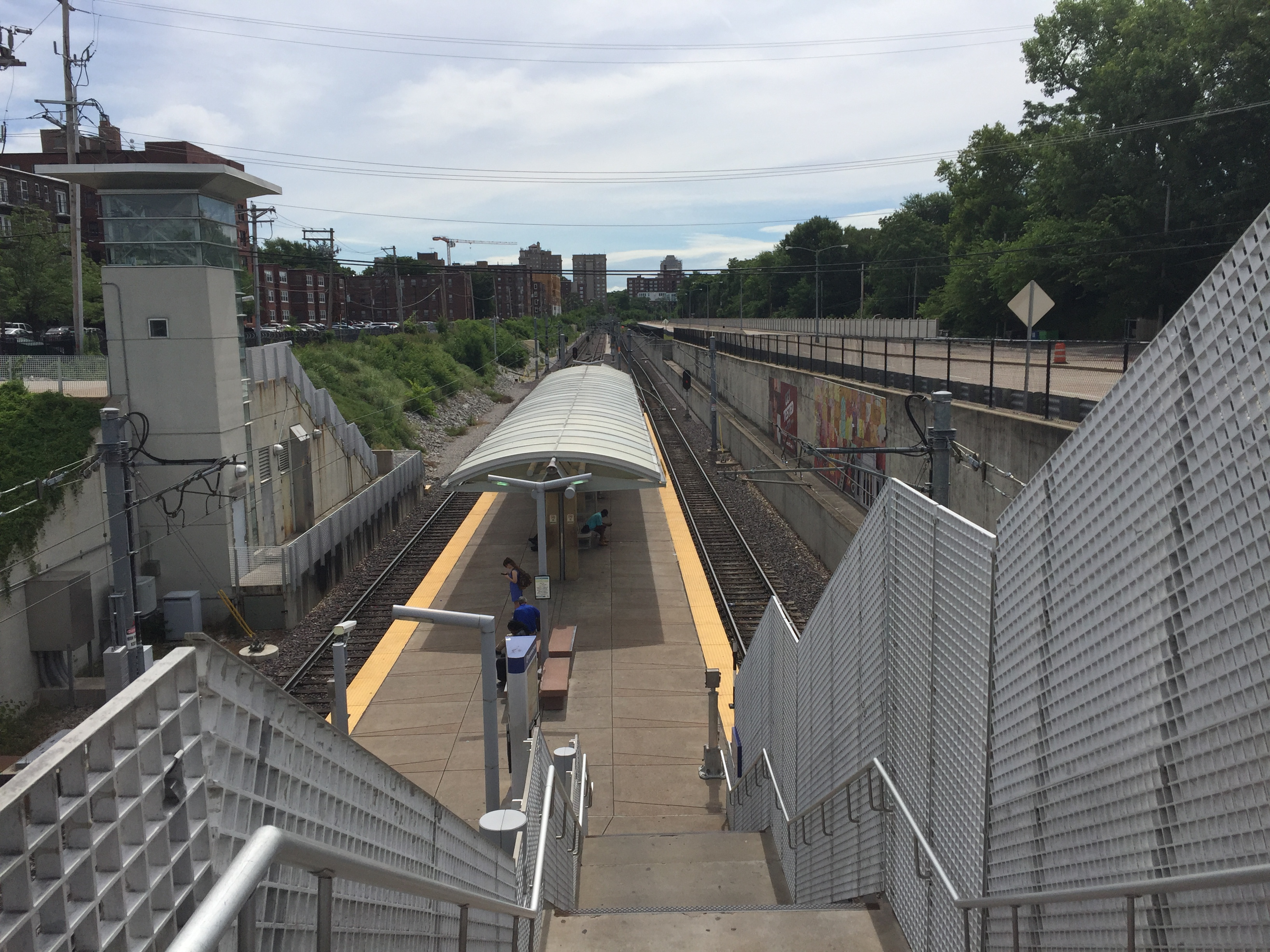
Forest Park–DeBaliviere

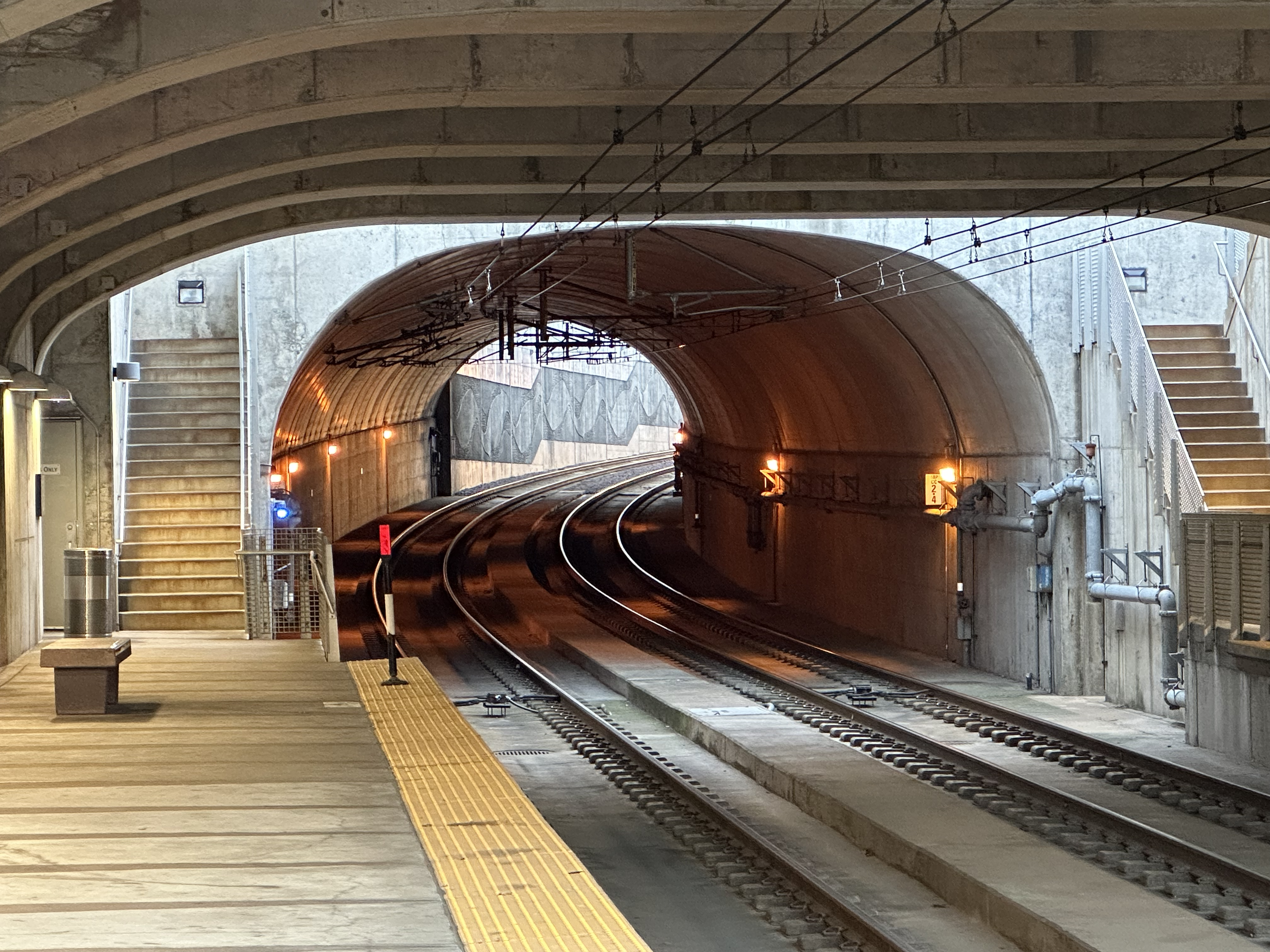
Forsyth

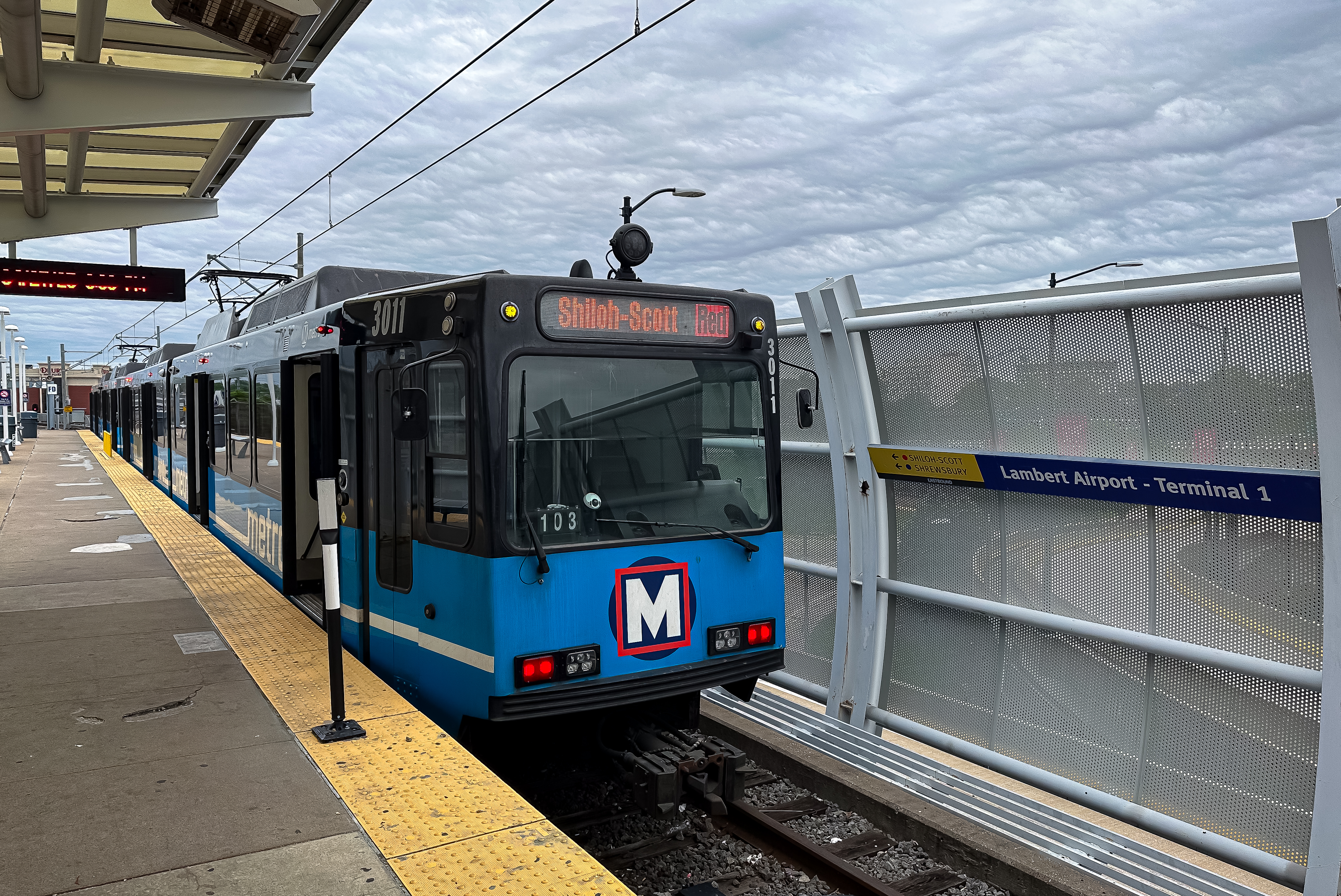
Lambert Airport Terminal 1

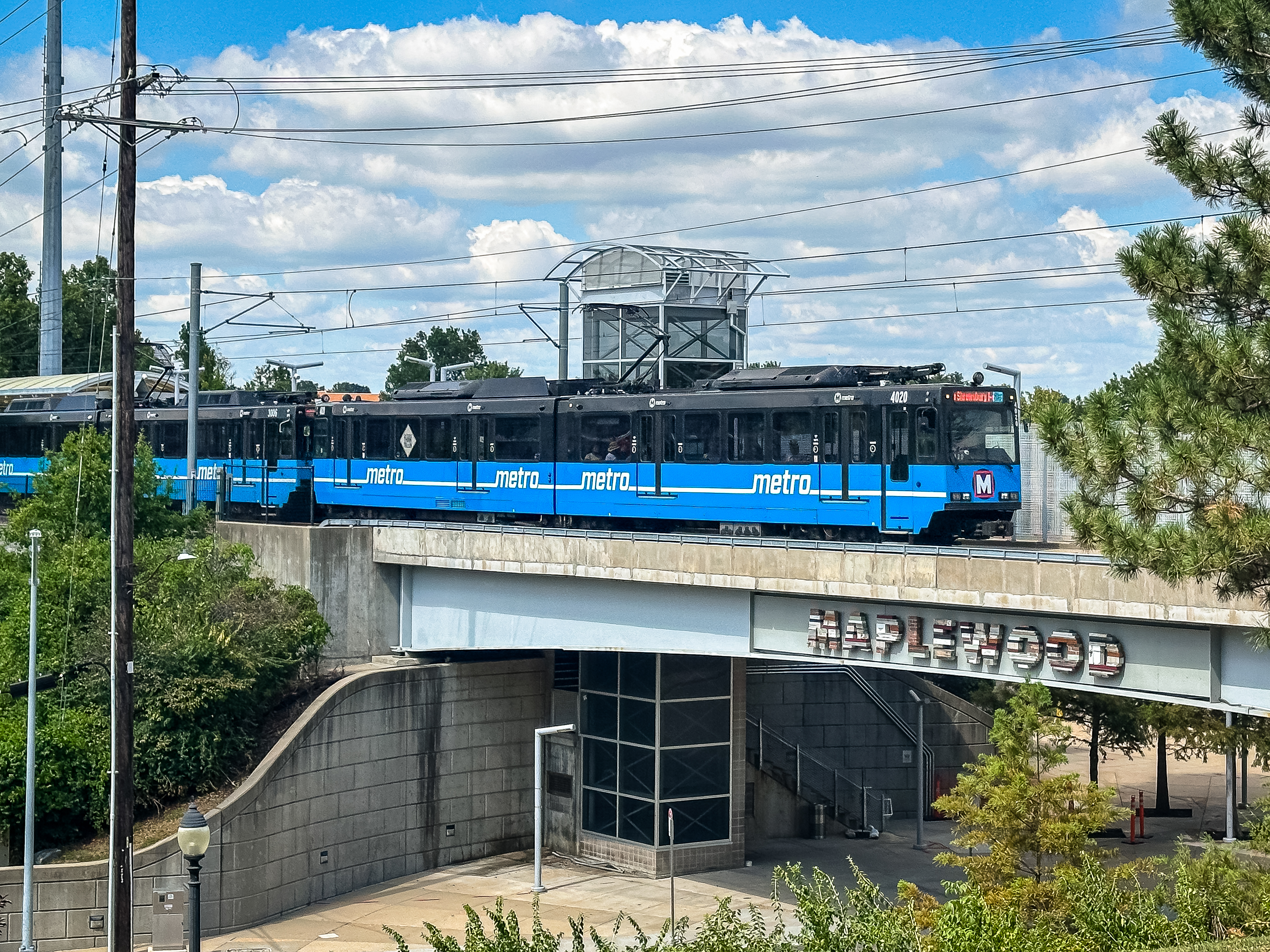
Maplewood–Manchester

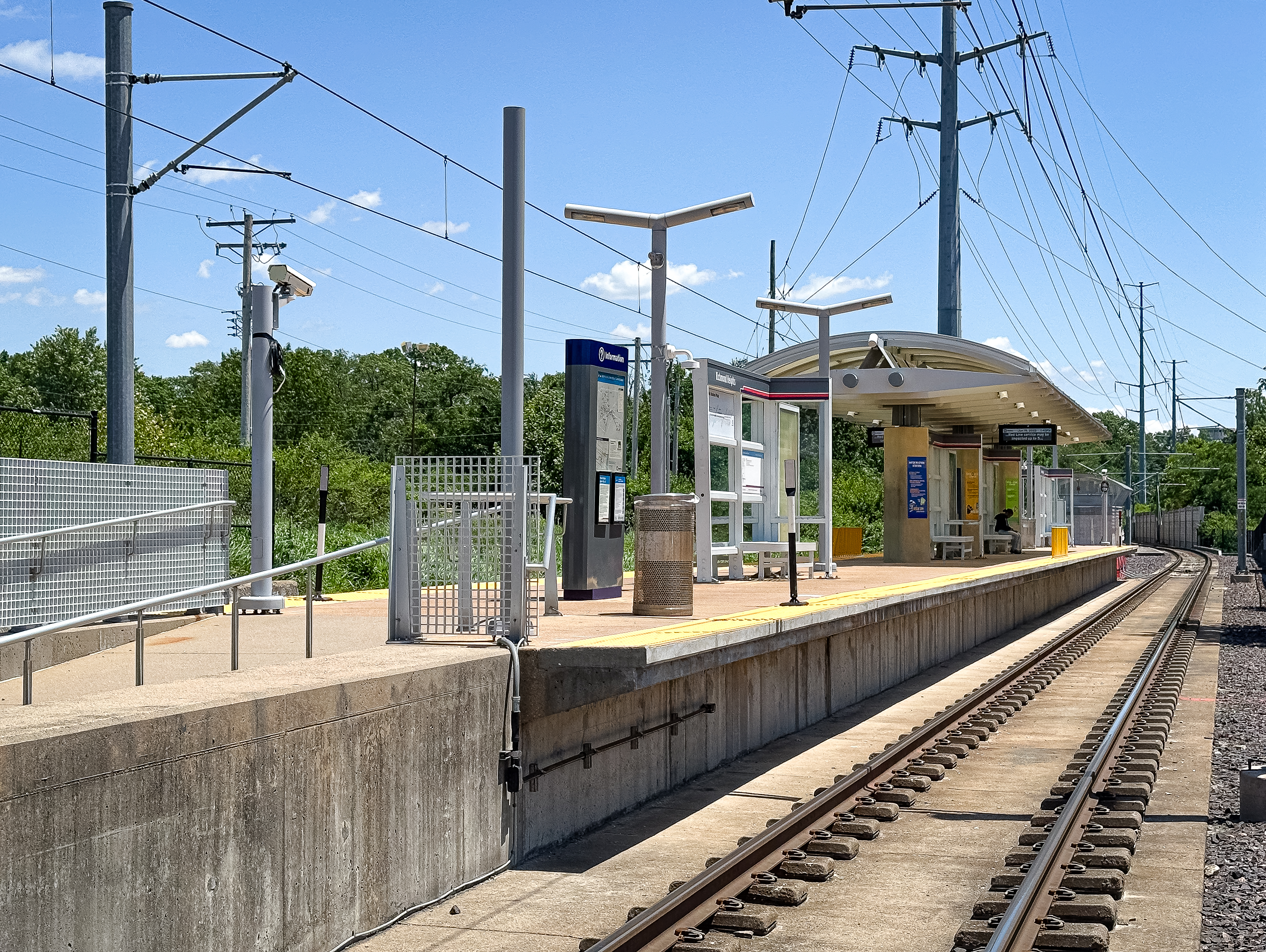
Richmond Heights

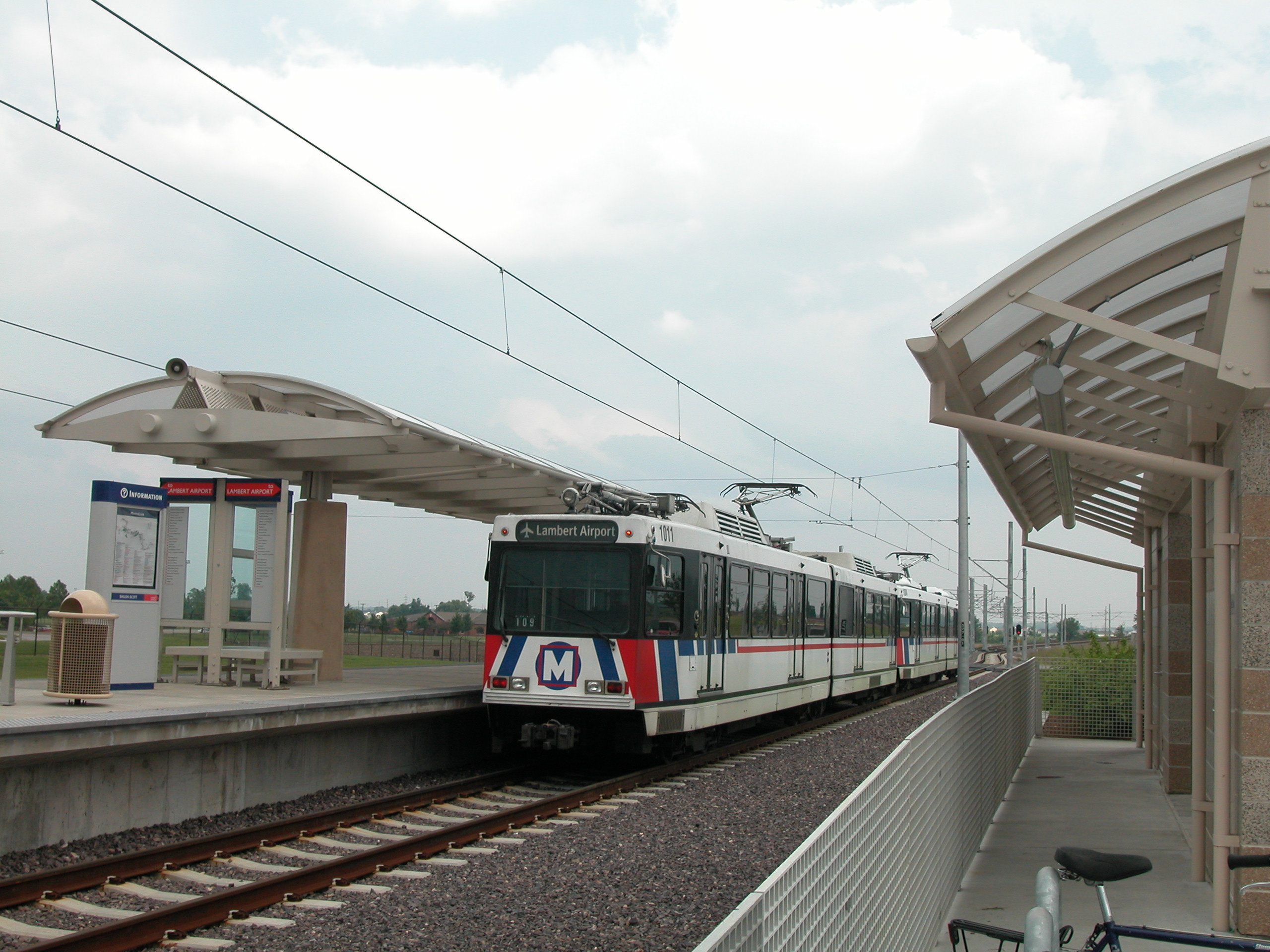
Shiloh–Scott

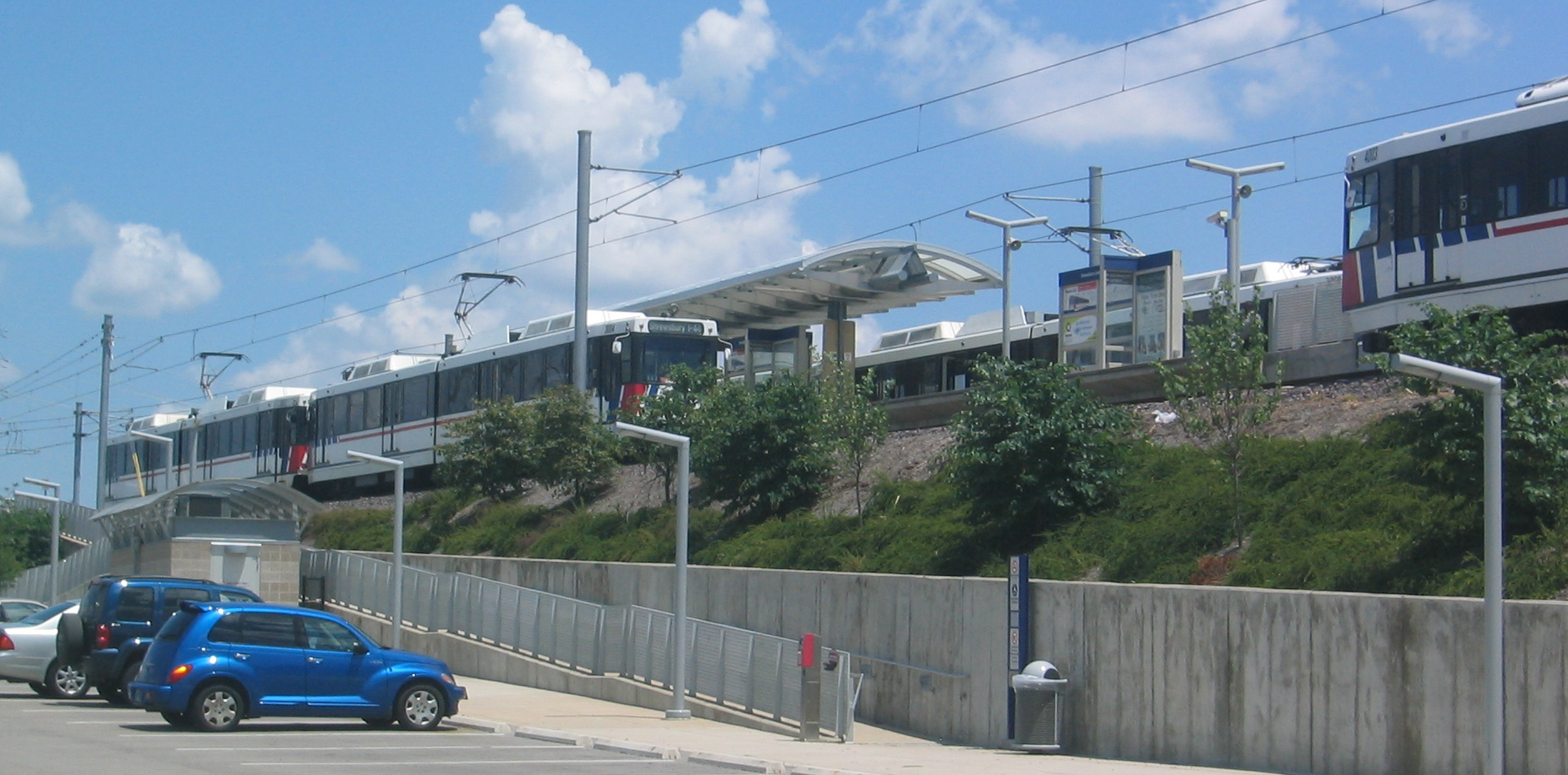
Shrewsbury–Lansdowne I-44

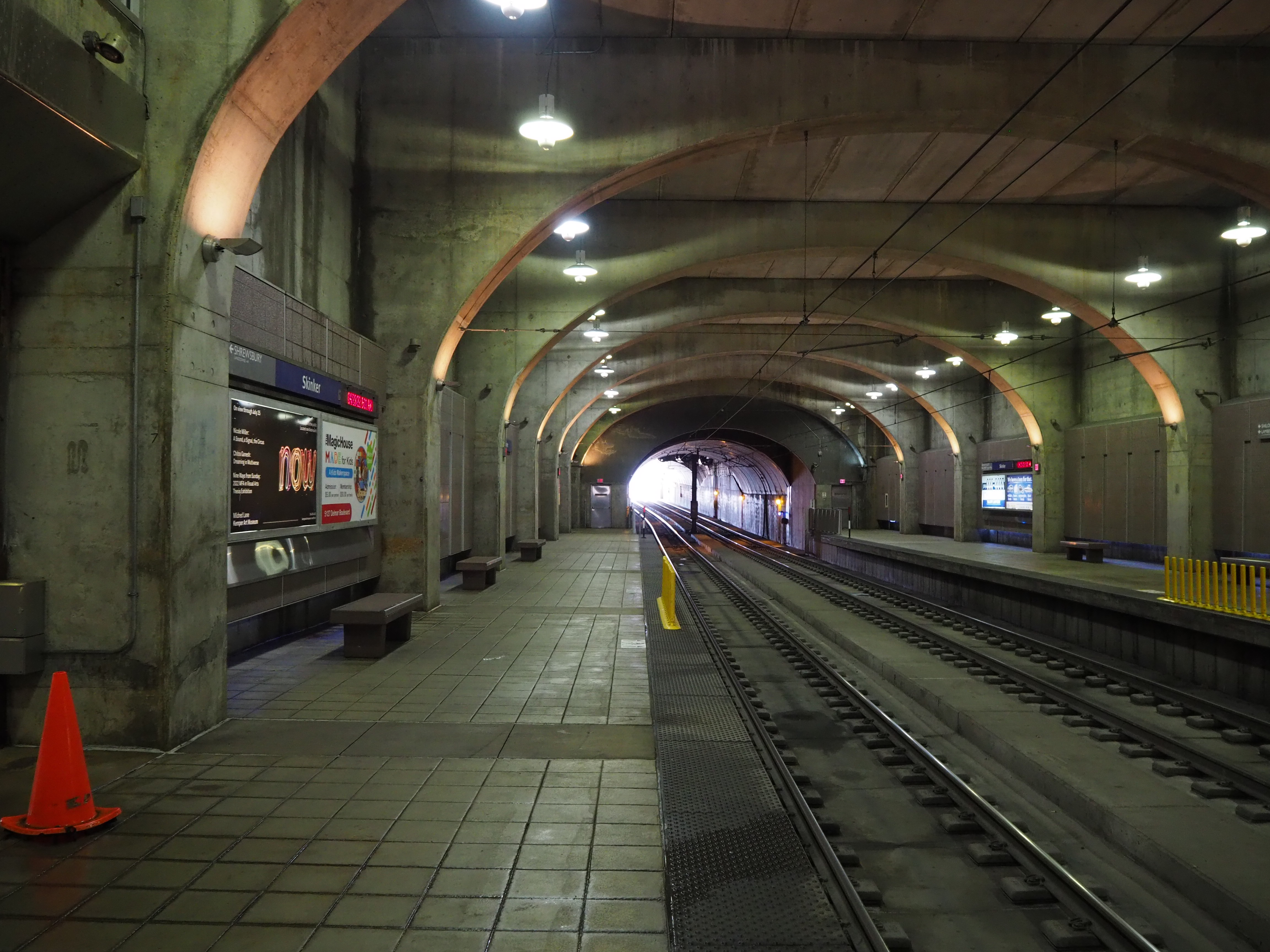
Skinker

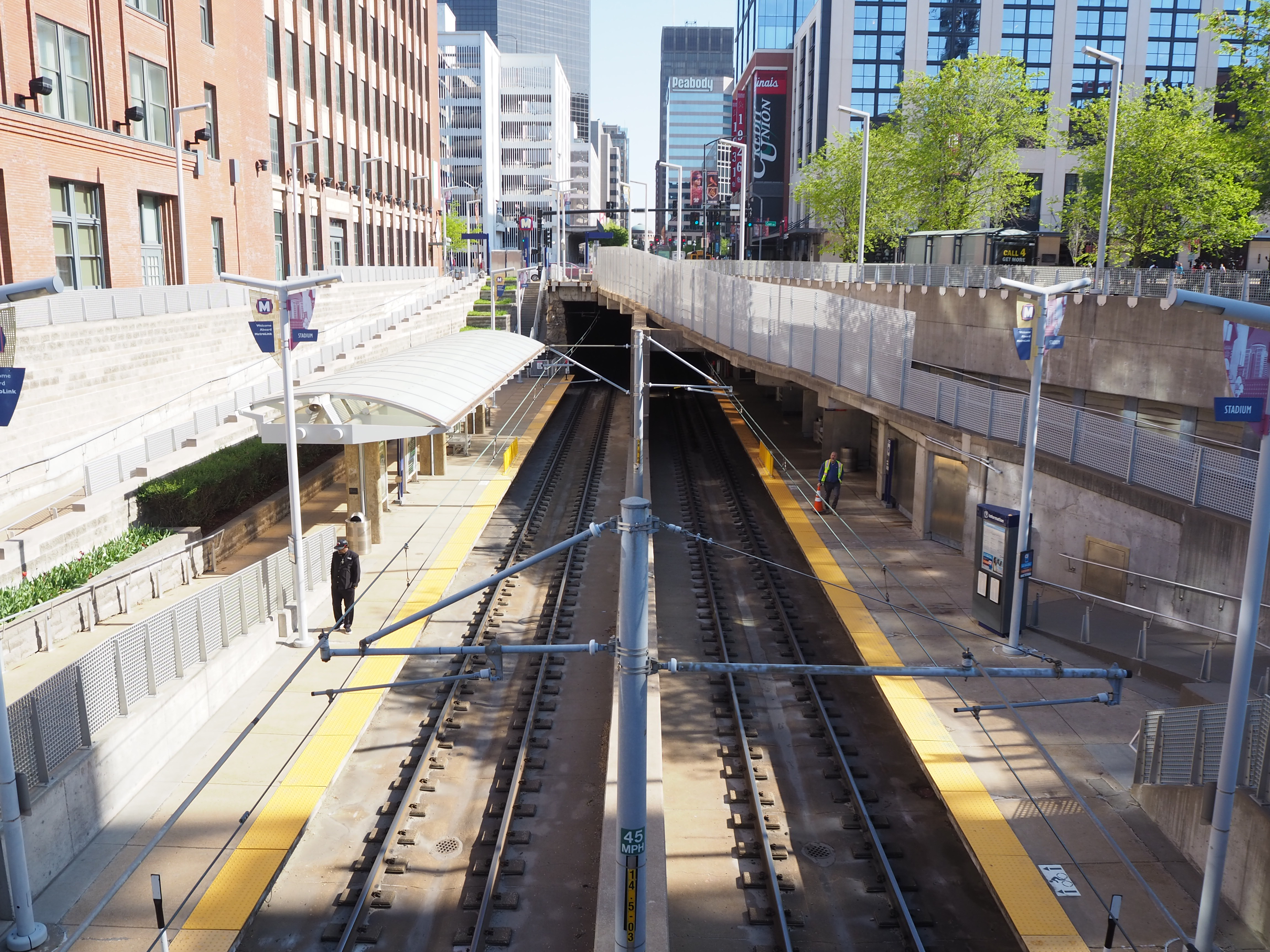
Stadium

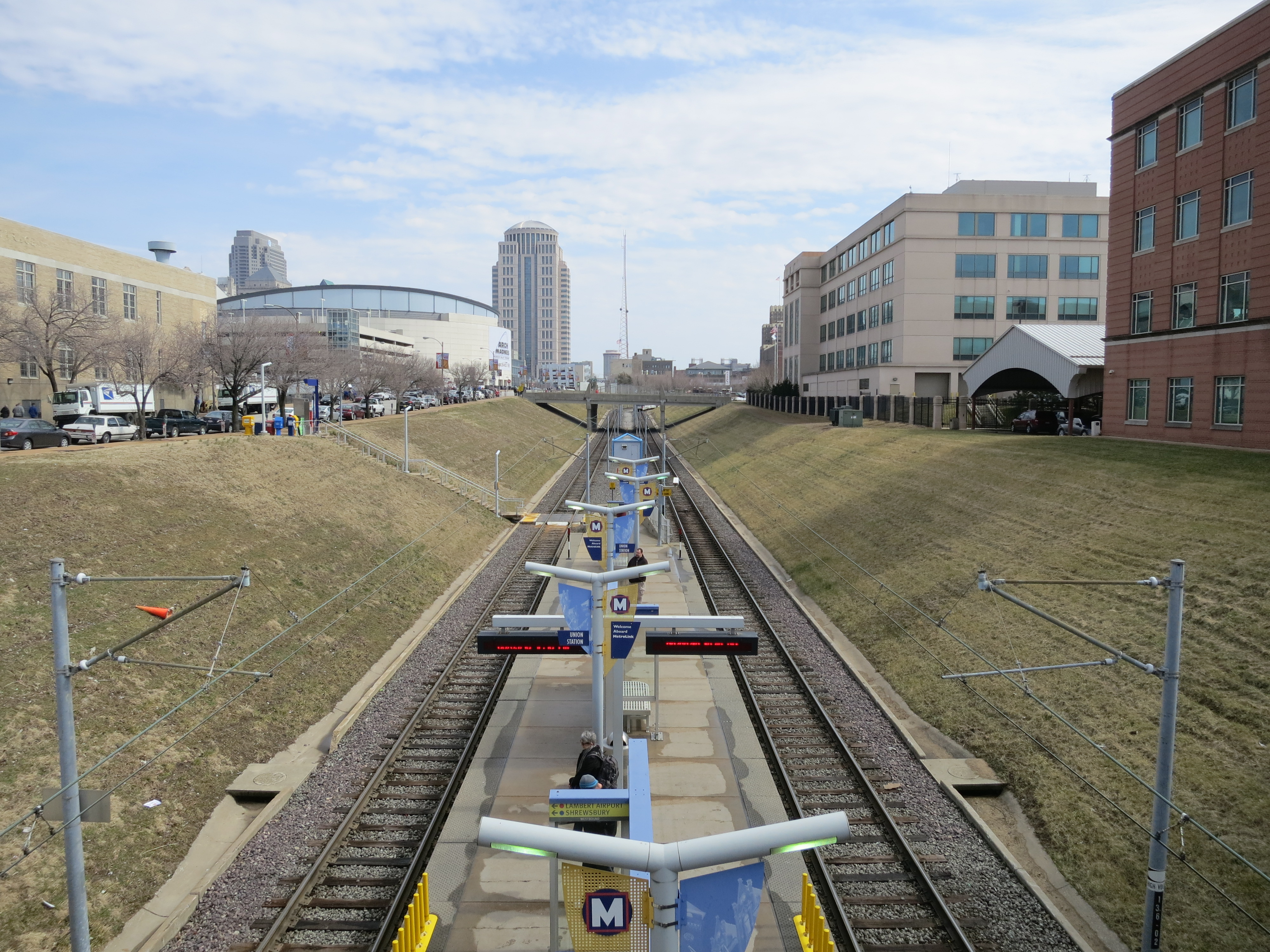
Union Station

== See also ==
- Bi-State Development Agency
- Madison County Transit
- St. Clair County Transit District
- Loop Trolley
- Metro Call-A-Ride
- MetroBus
- List of Metro Transit (St. Louis) yards and depots
- List of rail transit systems in the US
- List of tram and light-rail transit systems
- Transportation in St. Louis
