= Saint Louis Galleria =

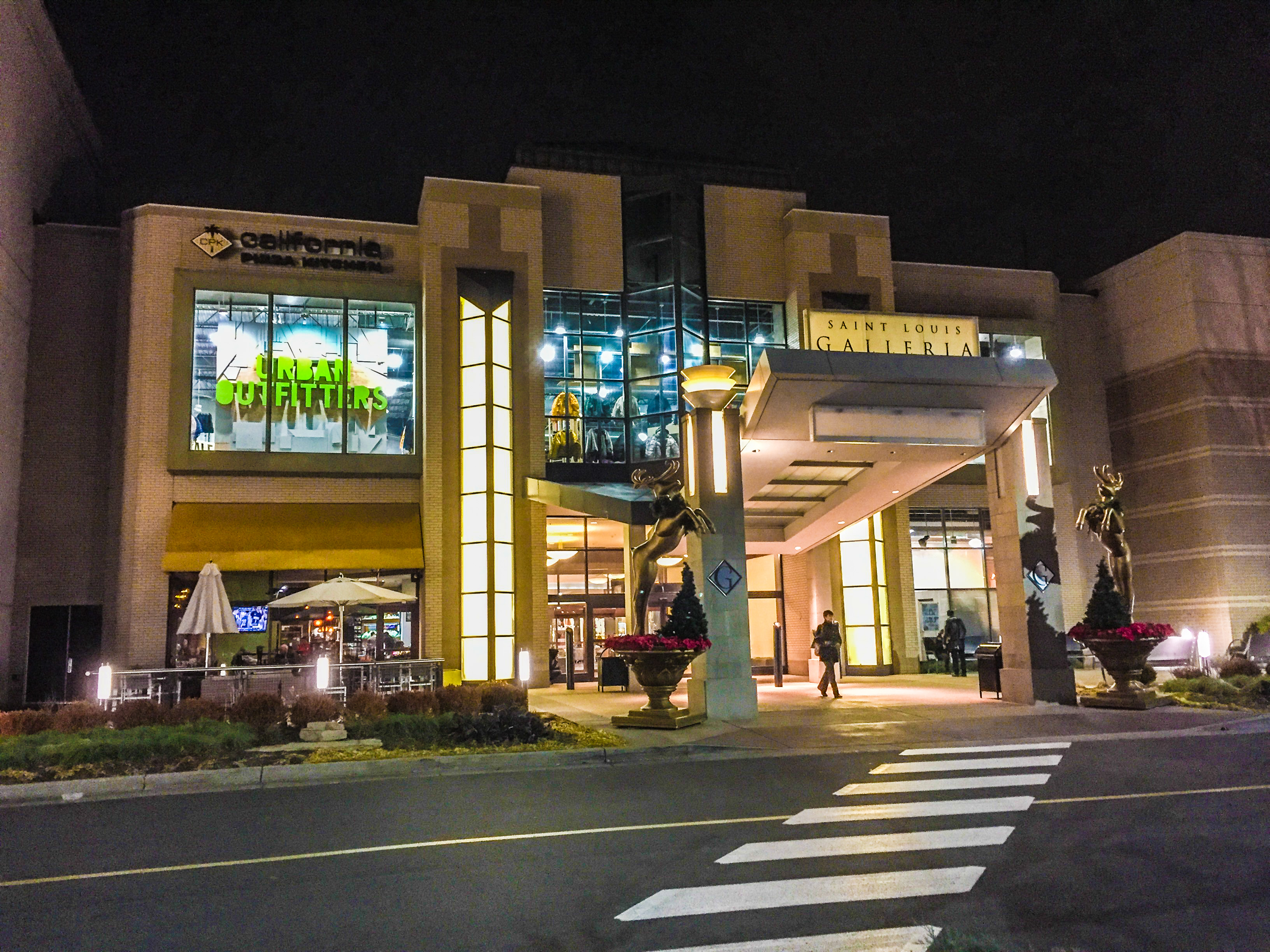
- Saint Louis Galleria at night, December 2017
- Location: Richmond Heights, Missouri
- Coordinates: 38.6350°N 90.3473°W
- Address: 1155 Saint Louis Galleria
- Opened: 1955 (as Westroads Shopping Center) 1986 (as Saint Louis Galleria)
- Developer: Stix, Baer & Fuller; Hycel Properties
- Manager: GGP
- Owner: GGP
- Num. of anchor tenants: 3
- Floor area: 1.2 million square feet (110,000 m^{2})
- Floors: 2 in the main mall area, 3 in the food court area and Macy's. 5 in Dillard's.
- Public transit: MetroBus; Blue; At Richmond Heights
- Website: www.saintlouisgalleria.com

Saint Louis Galleria is a shopping mall in Richmond Heights, Missouri, a suburb of St. Louis.

== History ==
Originally the site of the Westroads Shopping Center anchored by Stix, Baer & Fuller, the property was sold in 1984 to Hycel Properties, which demolished most of the mall except the Stix north wing, including Walgreens (demolished and now a recently closed Weber Grill restaurant), and built the Saint Louis Galleria in 1986.

Dillard's, which had acquired the Stix chain, expanded the existing location at the same time, while retailer Mark Shale opened a major store. In 1991, the building was expanded south of the Atrium. The Clayton Famous-Barr store (now Macy's) moved to the mall, and luxury department store Lord & Taylor opened on the south end. The addition also included an emergency electric generator that can supply limited lighting and monitoring functions (but not full operations) during a power failure. The mall receives external electric service from four points. It adopted the enclosed delivery corridor concept (but very little of the actual structure) from the Westroads design. Trucks enter on the south end and exit on the north end. The original loading dock for the Stix store (which remains in operation) is very similar in design to the loading dock at River Roads Mall, another Stix-developed shopping mall.

The first Build-A-Bear location was opened in October 1997. It was the second mall in the area to have an Apple Store (and formerly the area's only Apple mini store), hosts the area's only Urban Outfitters, and along with West County Center is seen as a more upscale shopping mall. On October 8, 2002, The Cheesecake Factory opened at the mall, becoming the area's first location.

Beginning April 20, 2007, after two incidents between teenagers and rampant shoplifting, anyone under 16 is required to be accompanied by someone at least 21 years old on Fridays and Saturdays after 3 pm. Around the same time, the Richmond Heights MetroLink station opened a short distance from the mall. The two incidents, along with many shoplifting and brawling cases, were blamed on MetroLink, simply due to the spike in the number of such cases at the mall in August 2006 compared to the previous month. This brought fear into shoppers about their safety in the mall and caused a decline in patronage.

In 2006, Nordstrom announced plans to open a store at the mall. In December 2008, Nordstrom said that due to the economy, it would delay the opening from 2010 until 2011. The store opened to the public on September 23, 2011.

The recession hit Galleria sales hard in 2008, as Jimmy'z and Mark Shale closed. Richmond Heights, which gets half its revenue from sales taxes and for which the Galleria is the largest taxpayer, saw sales-tax receipts drop from $10.1 million in fiscal 2007 to $9.1 million in the fiscal year that ended June 30, 2008. Mark Shale has since been replaced with two restaurants, Weber Grill Restaurant (now closed) and Texas de Brazil, and Helium Comedy Club.

In 2017, the mall was the site of protests after the acquittal of a white police officer in the shooting of Anthony Lamar Smith. There were arrests of 22 people.

In June 2018, a customer was stabbed by another customer at the mall.

In July 2020, a shooting inside the Galleria took place leaving one man dead and one man injured.

On June 23, 2025, Nordstrom announced that it would not renew its lease and would close its doors on August 24. That left West County Center as the only location in the area. It was also announced that a Dick's Sporting Goods would be replacing the Nordstrom at the Saint Louis Galleria. Dick’s Sporting Goods plans to open one of their large format Dick’s House of Sport stores in the mall. This will utilize both floors of the former Nordstrom. As of 2026, the Dick’s House of Sport store is currently under construction.
