= List of MetroLink (St. Louis) stations =

MetroLink System Map

MetroLink is a light rail system that serves the Greater St. Louis area in the United States. The 46-mile (74.0 km) system has two lines and is operated by Metro Transit, an enterprise of the Bi-State Development Agency.

MetroLink currently has 38 stations; 13 are served only by the Red Line, nine only by the Blue Line, and the other 16 by both lines. Thirteen stations are located in the City of St. Louis; 14 in St. Louis County; and 11 in St. Clair County, Illinois. Central West End is the busiest station by daily ridership, Sunnen is the least busy.

The first 13.9-mile (22.4 km) segment opened on July 31, 1993 between the North Hanley and 5th & Missouri stations. The remainder of this initial 17-mile (27 km) alignment was completed on June 25, 1994 when the extension to Lambert Airport Main opened. Three infill stations have been added to this original alignment. East Riverfront in 1994, Lambert Airport East in 1998, and Cortex in 2018. The system has seen two major expansions. In 2001-03, St. Clair County extended the Red Line 20.9 miles (33.6 km) to the Shiloh-Scott station near Scott Air Force Base. In 2006, the 8-mile (12.9 km) Cross County Extension added Blue Line service between the Forest Park–DeBaliviere and Shrewsbury–Lansdowne I-44 stations via Clayton, Missouri.

A 5.2-mile (8.4 km) extension of the Red Line from Shiloh-Scott to MidAmerica St. Louis Airport in Mascoutah, Illinois broke ground in 2023 and is expected to be operational in early 2026.

== Stations ==
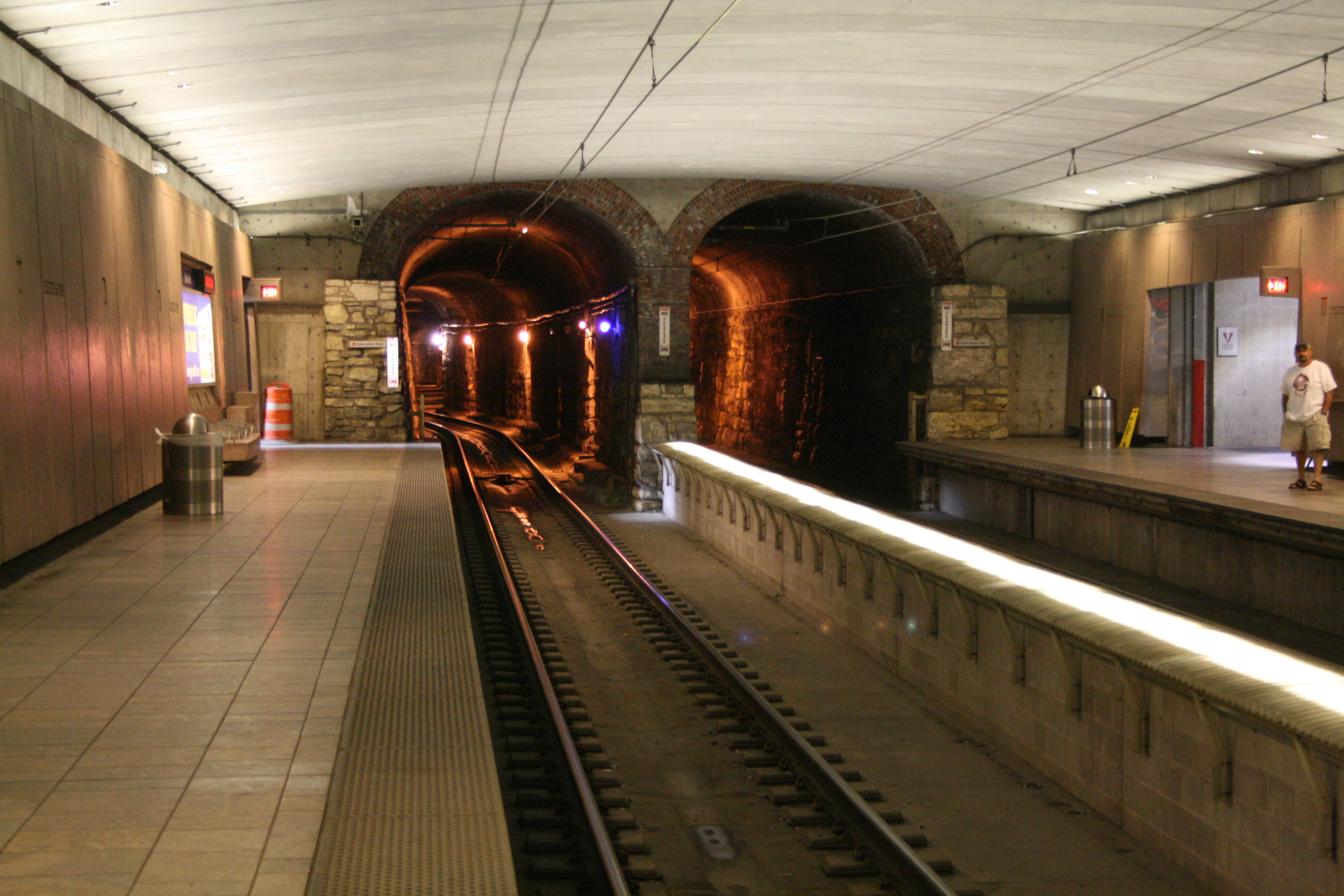
Interior view of the 8th & Pine subway station in downtown St. Louis

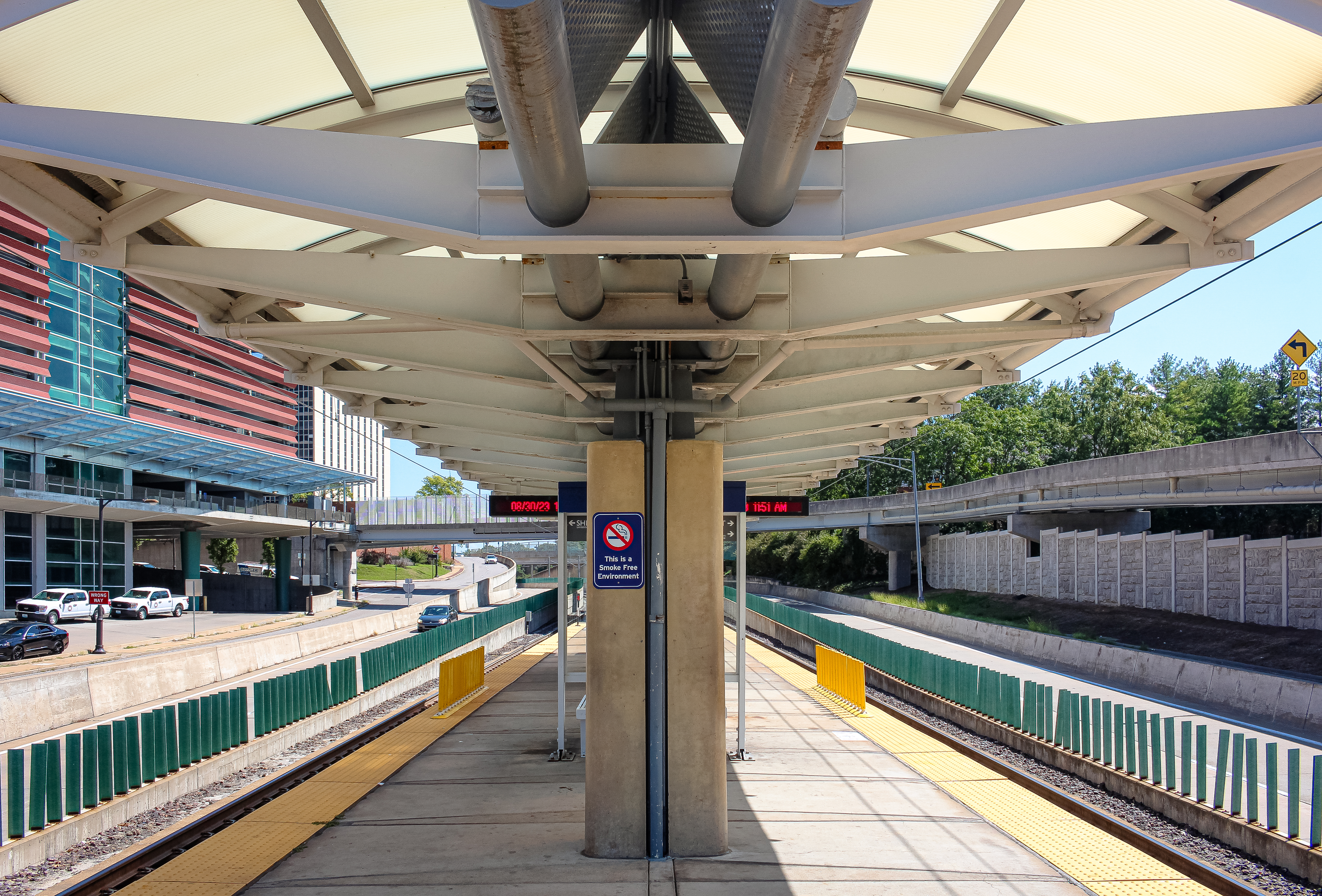
Platform at Clayton station in 2023

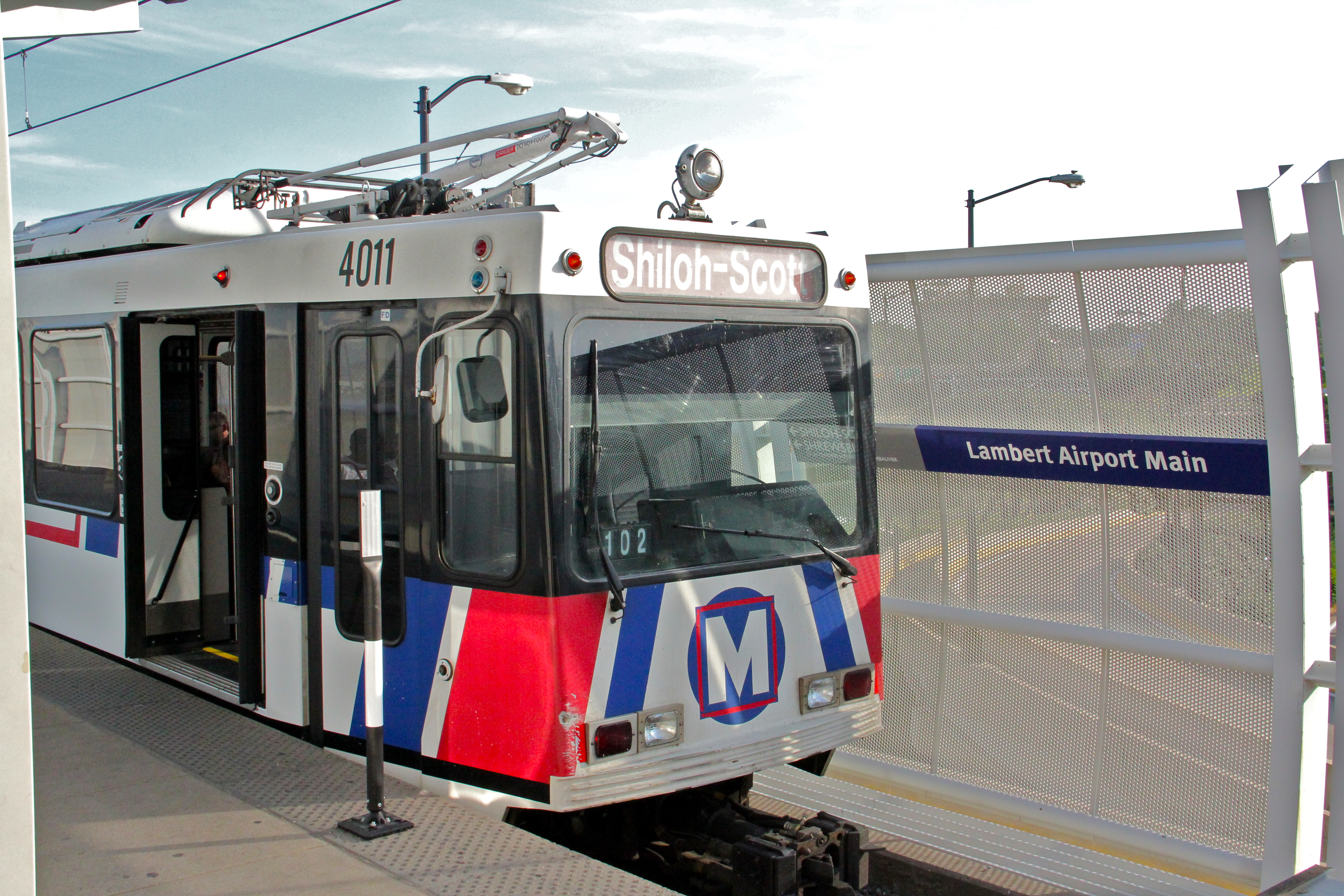
A train at the Terminal 1 station at St. Louis Lambert International Airport

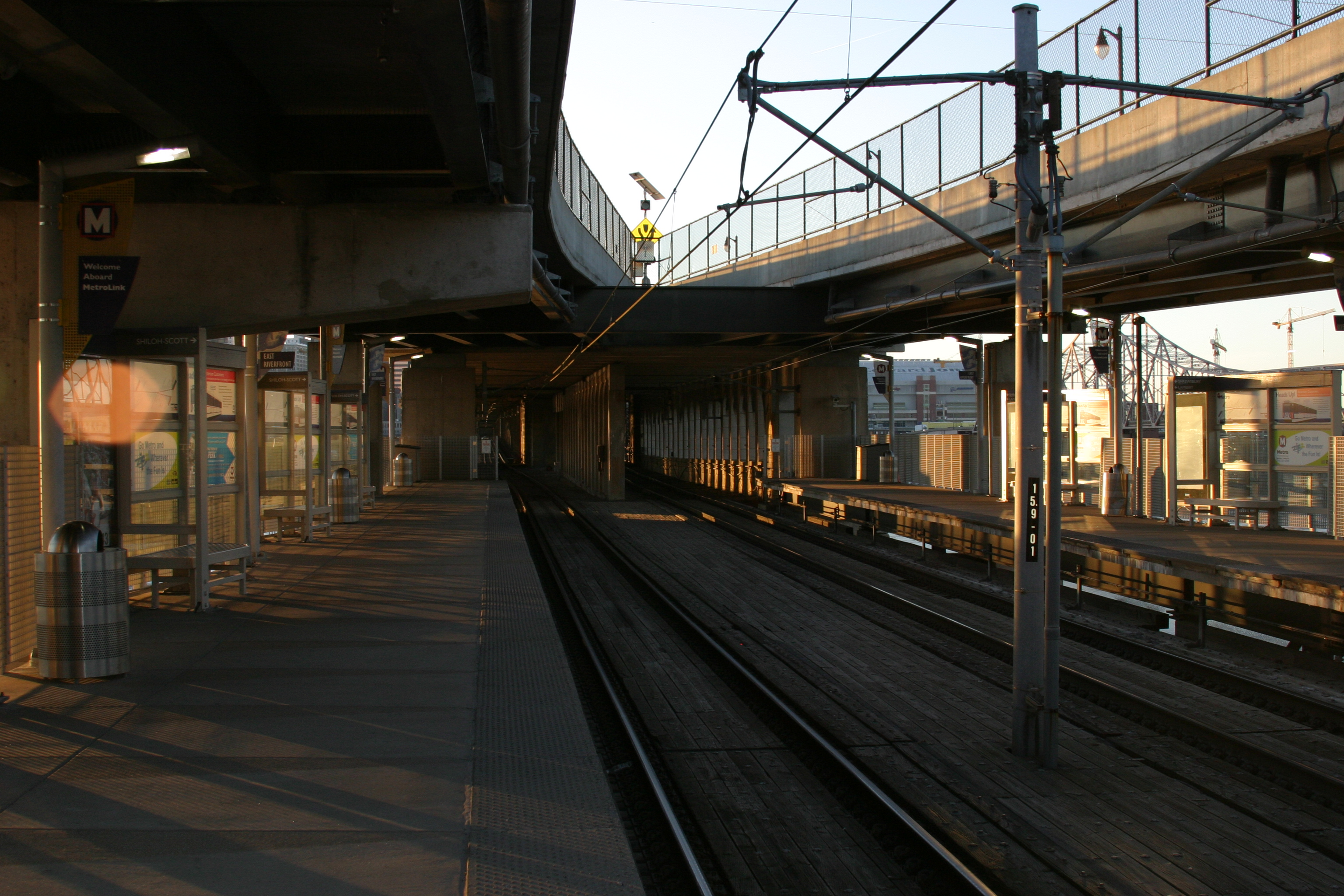
East Riverfront station in 2008

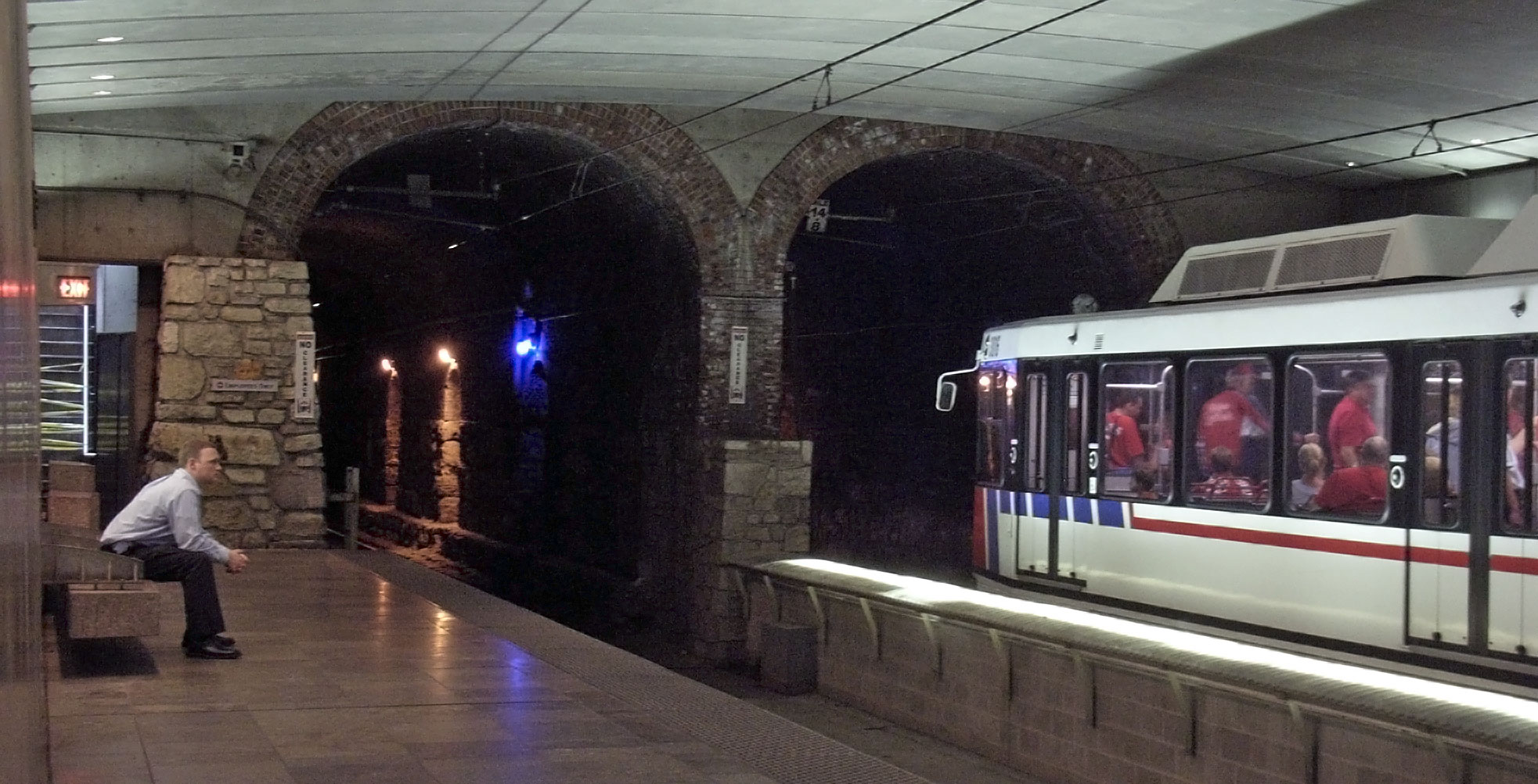
A view of the brick arches in the historic St. Louis Freight Tunnel, now used for MetroLink

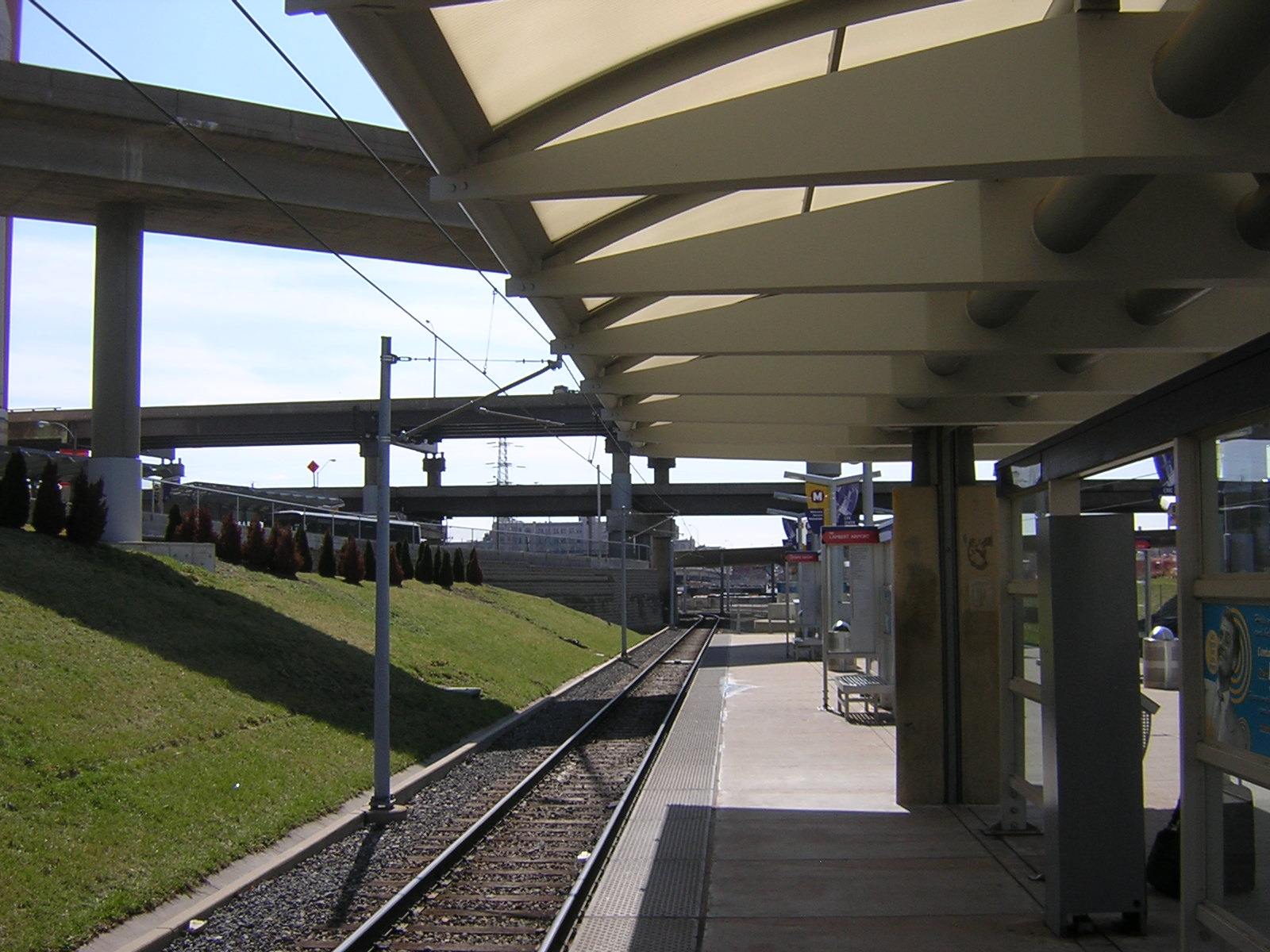
Platform of the Civic Center station (I-64 ramps can be seen in the background)

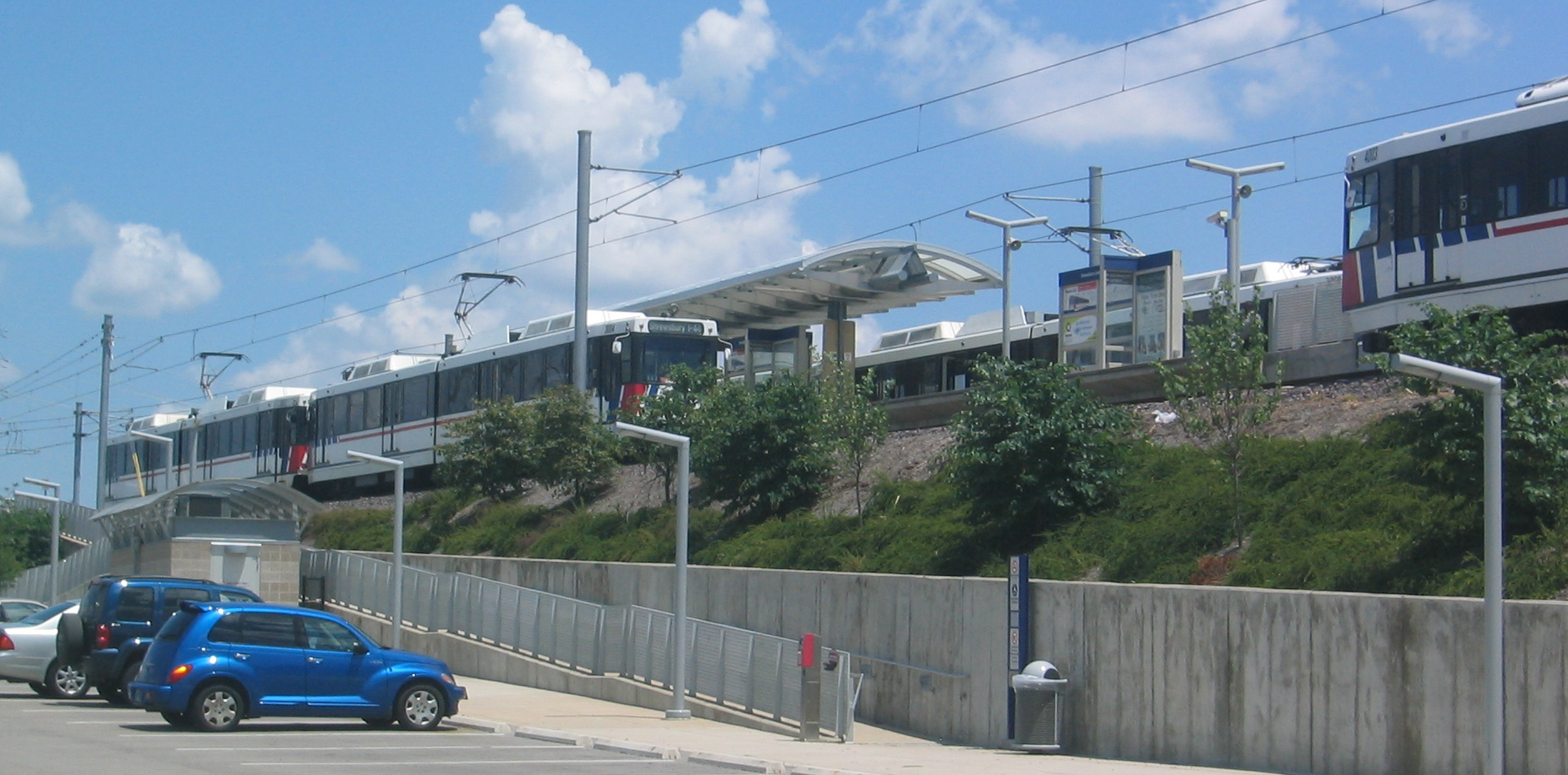
West side view of the Shrewsbury-Lansdowne I-44 station

Station	Lines	City	Opened	Weekday ridership (FY2018)
5th & Missouri	Red; Blue	East St. Louis	July 31, 1993	1,323
8th & Pine	Red; Blue	St. Louis	July 31, 1993	1,382
Belleville	Red	Belleville	May 5, 2001	534
Brentwood I-64	Blue	Brentwood	August 26, 2006	916
Central West End	Red; Blue	St. Louis	July 31, 1993	4,885
Civic Center	Red; Blue	St. Louis	July 31, 1993	2,217
Clayton	Blue	Clayton	August 26, 2006	913
College	Red	Belleville	May 5, 2001	509
Convention Center	Red; Blue	St. Louis	July 31, 1993	1,309
Cortex	Red; Blue	St. Louis	July 31, 2018	900
Delmar Loop	Red	St. Louis	July 31, 1993	1,692
East Riverfront	Red; Blue	East St. Louis	May 14, 1994	567
Emerson Park	Red; Blue	East St. Louis	May 5, 2001	1,094
Fairview Heights†	Red; Blue	Fairview Heights	May 5, 2001	1,611
Forest Park–DeBaliviere*	Red; Blue	St. Louis	July 31, 1993	3,711
Forsyth	Blue	University City	August 26, 2006	362
Grand	Red; Blue	St. Louis	July 31, 1993	2,535
Jackie Joyner-Kersee Center	Red; Blue	East St. Louis	May 5, 2001	462
Laclede's Landing	Red; Blue	St. Louis	July 31, 1993	563
Lambert Airport Terminal 1†	Red	St. Louis	June 25, 1994	1,060
Lambert Airport Terminal 2	Red	St. Louis	December 23, 1998	380
Maplewood–Manchester	Blue	Maplewood	August 26, 2006	770
Memorial Hospital	Red	Belleville	May 5, 2001	304
North Hanley	Red	Berkeley	July 31, 1993	2,713
Richmond Heights	Blue	Richmond Heights	August 26, 2006	618
Rock Road	Red	Pagedale	July 31, 1993	1,408
Shiloh–Scott†	Red	Shiloh	June 23, 2003	549
Shrewsbury–Lansdowne I-44†	Blue	St. Louis	August 26, 2006	1,523
Skinker	Blue	St. Louis	August 26, 2006	887
Stadium	Red; Blue	St. Louis	July 31, 1993	1,180
Sunnen	Blue	Maplewood	August 26, 2006	243
Swansea	Red	Swansea	May 5, 2001	370
UMSL North	Red	Normandy	July 31, 1993	385
UMSL South	Red	Normandy	July 31, 1993	516
Union Station	Red; Blue	St. Louis	July 31, 1993	1,142
University City–Big Bend	Blue	University City	August 26, 2006	486
Washington Park	Red; Blue	Washington Park	May 5, 2001	599
Wellston	Red	Wellston	July 31, 1993	848

*	Primary transfer station
†	Terminals

== See also ==
- Bi-State Development Agency
- Metro Transit (St. Louis)
- List of Metro Transit (St. Louis) yards and depots
- St. Clair County Transit District
- List of rail transit systems in the United States
