= Red Line (St. Louis MetroLink) =

Light rail line in the Greater St. Louis area

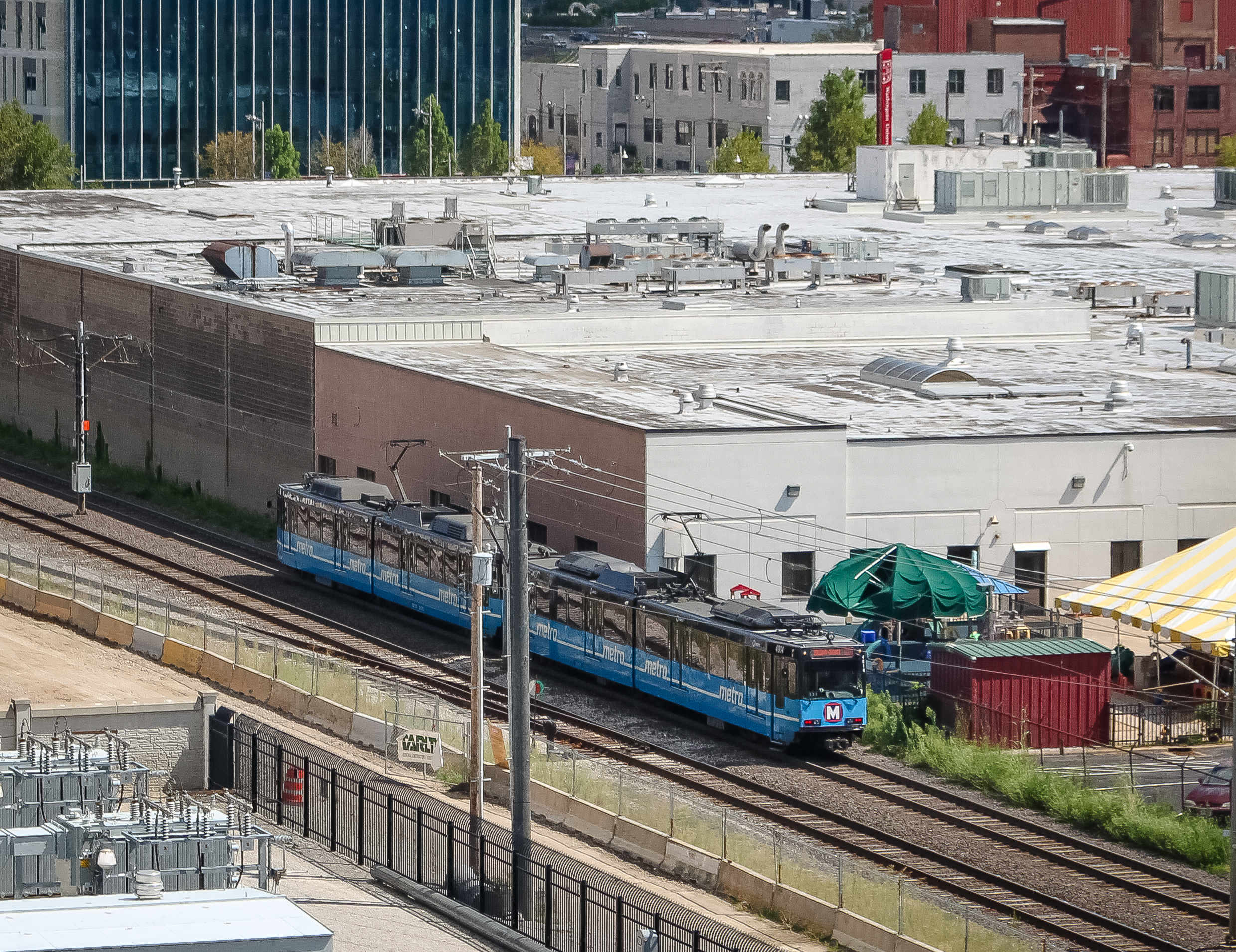
- Eastbound Red Line train traveling through the Central West End

Overview
- Status: Operational
- Owner: Bi-State Development Agency
- Locale: Greater St. Louis, Missouri–Illinois, U.S.
- Termini: Lambert Airport Terminal 1 (west); Shiloh–Scott (east)
- Stations: 29 (1 under construction)
- Website: metrostlouis.org/metrolink

Service
- Type: Light rail
- System: St. Louis MetroLink
- Operator: Metro Transit
- Depots: Ewing Yard and Shops; 29th Street Yard and Shops

History
- Opened: July 31, 1993
- Previous names: Lambert Airport Branch

Technical
- Line length: 38 mi (61 km)
- Character: Elevated, subway, at-grade
- Track gauge: 4 ft 8 1/2 in (1,435 mm) standard gauge
- Electrification: Overhead line, 750 V DC
Route map
Red Line highlighted in red

The Red Line is the older and longer line of the MetroLink light rail system in Greater St. Louis. It serves 29 stations across three counties and two states.

While officially light rail, the Red Line has many characteristics of a light metro or rapid transit service, including an independent right-of-way, a higher top speed, and level boarding at all platforms.

== History ==
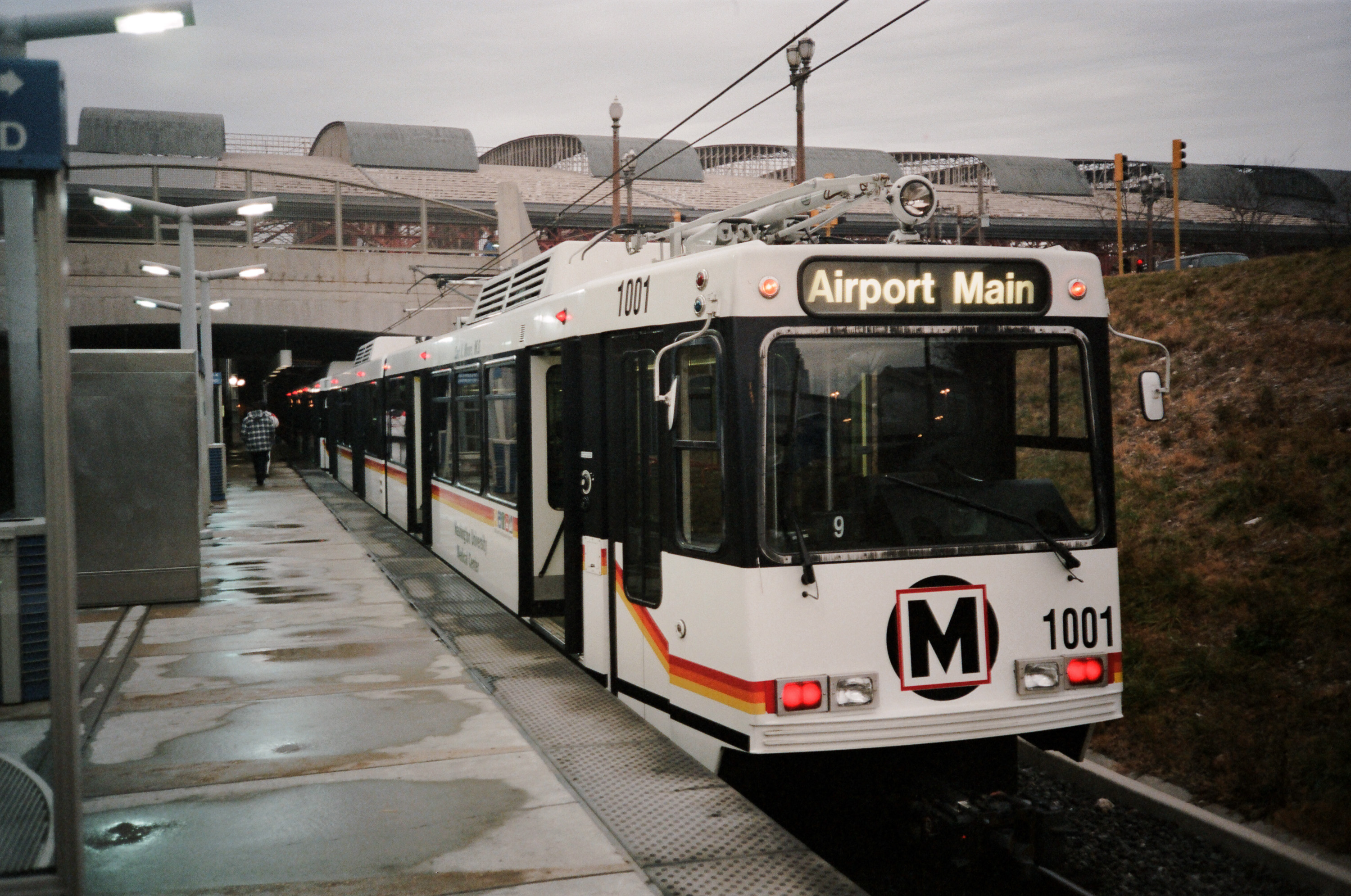
MetroLink at Union Station in 1995

Transit planning along the Airport/Central corridor began in 1971, when it was selected as the region's primary target for further study. In 1983, funding was approved to evaluate five mode alternatives, which culminated in a 1984 draft environmental impact statement. After a series of public hearings, the East–West Gateway Council of Governments adopted light rail as the region's preferred mode.

The budget for design, engineering, construction, and testing was $287.7 million (equivalent to $675 million in 2025 dollars). The city of St. Louis acquired unused railroad facilities and property with an estimated value of $100 million and donated it to the project, supplying the local match.

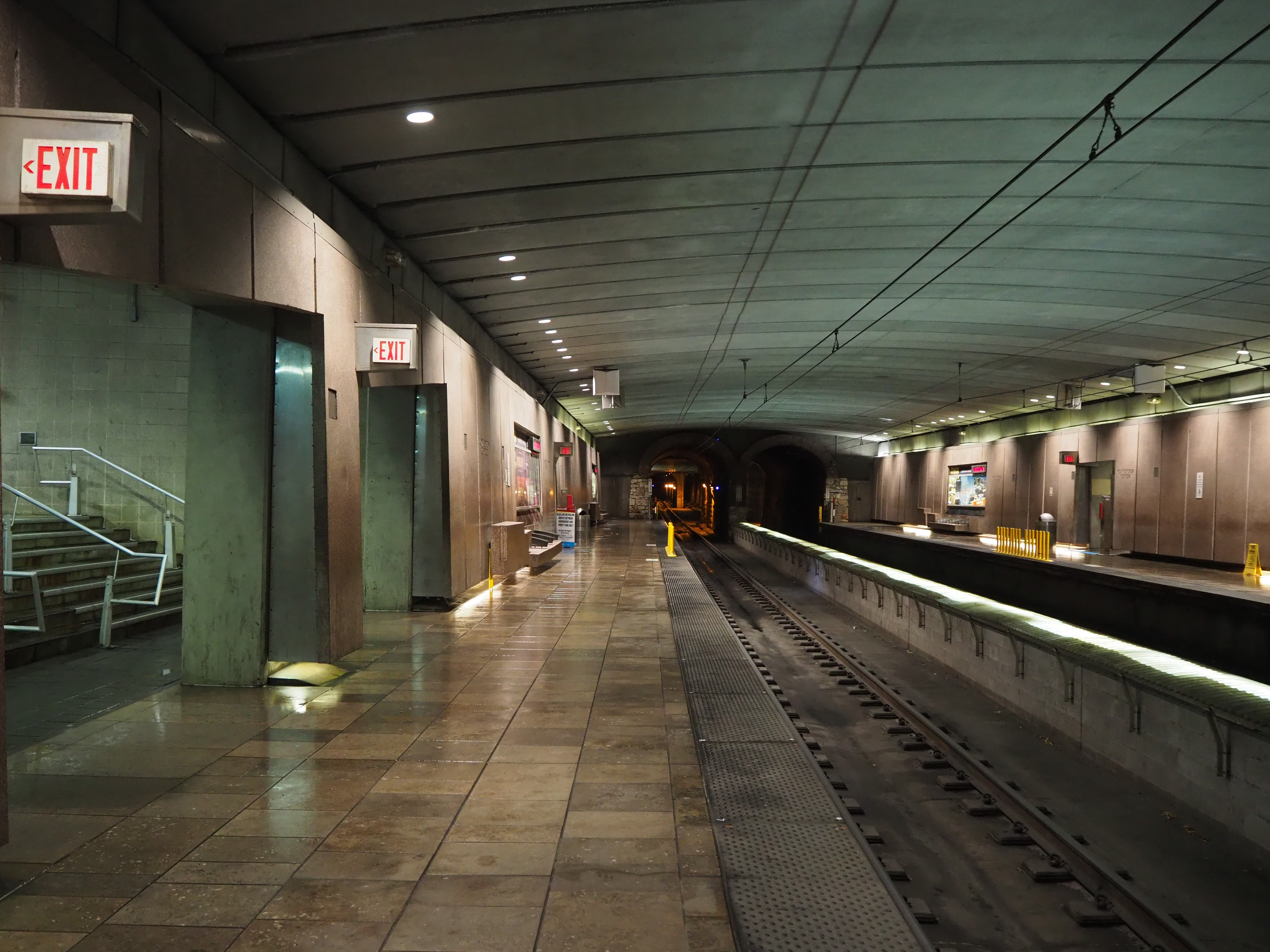
The westbound platform at Convention Center on the Red and Blue lines

Construction on the initial 13.9-mile (22.4 km) route, dubbed the Lambert Airport branch, began in 1990. It opened on July 31, 1993, with 16 stations between North Hanley and 5th & Missouri. An extension to Lambert Airport Main opened on June 25, 1994, bringing the line to 17 miles (27 km). Three infill stations have since been added: East Riverfront in 1994, Lambert Airport East in 1998, and Cortex in 2018.

In 1998, construction began on a 17.4-mile (28.0 km), eight-station extension from 5th & Missouri to College in St. Clair County, Illinois. The project was completed in May 2001 at a cost of $339.2 million, with $243.9 million paid by the Federal Transit Administration (FTA) and $95.2 million paid by the St. Clair County Transit District (SCCTD). A $75 million, 3.5-mile (5.6 km) extension from College to the Shiloh-Scott station opened in 2003. It was funded by a $60 million grant from the Illinois FIRST (Fund for Infrastructure, Roads, Schools, and Transit) Program and $15 million from SCCTD.

On October 27, 2008, the Lambert Airport branch was renamed the Red Line.

On July 26, 2022, a flash flood shut down MetroLink for nearly 72 hours and caused roughly $40 million in damage. Nearly 5 miles (8.0 km) of track bed was damaged, along with two elevators, two communications rooms, and three signal houses. By September, Red Line service had returned to normal, although Blue Line service was still restricted. On July 31, 2023, Metro received $27.7 million in federal emergency disaster relief funding to help cover flood repairs.

== Route ==
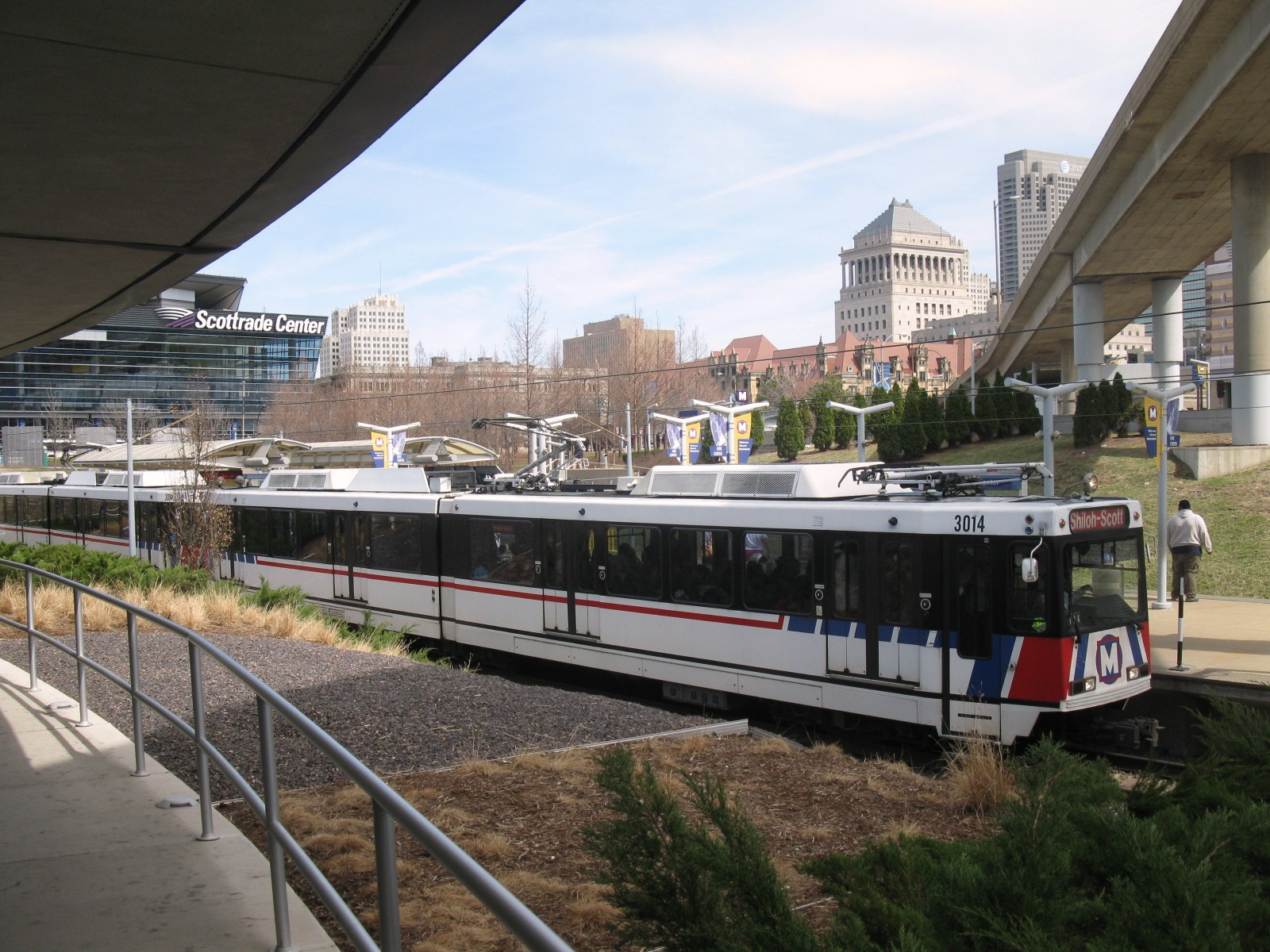
A Red Line train at Civic Center in downtown St. Louis.

The 38-mile (61 km) Red Line begins at St. Louis Lambert International Airport, making stops at the Terminal 1 and Terminal 2 stations. It proceeds through Kinloch, then stops at the North Hanley station near Bel-Ridge. It makes two stops (UMSL North & UMSL South) at the University of Missouri St. Louis in Normandy. After UMSL, trains run on the old Wabash/Norfolk & Western Railroad's Union Depot line that once brought passenger trains from Ferguson to Union Station. Traveling into Pagedale, it stops at the Rock Road station and then at Wellston's namesake station on Plymouth Street. Entering St. Louis City at Skinker Boulevard, the line stops at the Delmar Loop station and its namesake entertainment district. At the following station, Forest Park-DeBaliviere, the Red Line meets the Blue Line; the two services then share the alignment until the Blue Line terminates at the Fairview Heights station in Illinois.

=== Shared alignment ===
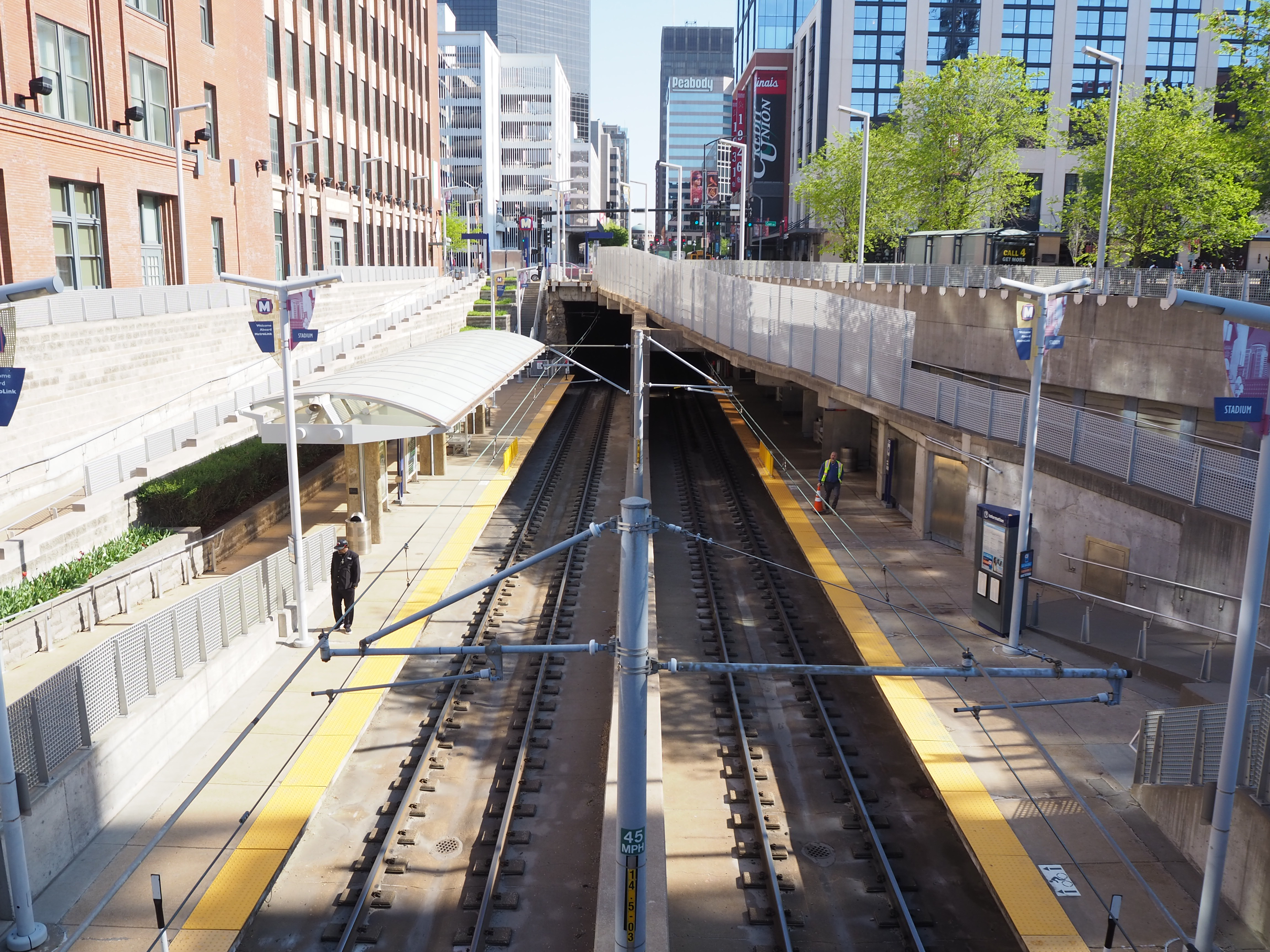
The platforms at Stadium in downtown St. Louis.

In all, the Red and Blue lines share tracks for 16 stations. From west to east: the Central West End and Cortex stations that serve the Central West End neighborhood, Washington University Medical Center, and Cortex Innovation Community. The Grand station transfers with the busy #70 MetroBus line and serves Saint Louis University and its hospital. Next, the Union Station, Civic Center, Stadium, 8th & Pine, Convention Center, and Laclede's Landing stations serve downtown St. Louis and its many destinations. A connection to the proposed Green Line BRT is planned at Civic Center station. Crossing the historic Eads Bridge into Illinois, the line serves the East Riverfront, 5th & Missouri, Emerson Park, Jackie Joyner-Kersee Center, and Washington Park stations in East St. Louis, Illinois. At the next station, Fairview Heights, the Blue Line ends. The Red Line continues south through Belleville, Illinois, to its terminus at the Shiloh–Scott station near Scott Air Force Base.

=== Stations ===
From Lambert Airport to Shiloh-Scott (west to east)

| Station | Transfer | City/town served | County | Opening date |
|---|---|---|---|---|
| Lambert Airport Terminal 1 | | Edmundson | St. Louis County | June 25, 1994 |
| Lambert Airport Terminal 2 | | Woodson Terrace | St. Louis County | December 23, 1998 |
| North Hanley | | Carsonville | St. Louis County | July 31, 1993 |
| UMSL–North | | Normandy | St. Louis County | July 31, 1993 |
| UMSL–South | | Normandy | St. Louis County | July 31, 1993 |
| Rock Road | | Pagedale | St. Louis County | July 31, 1993 |
| Wellston | | Wellston | St. Louis County | July 31, 1993 |
| Delmar Loop | | Independent city of St. Louis | | July 31, 1993 |
| Forest Park–DeBaliviere | Blue | Independent city of St. Louis | | July 31, 1993 |
| Central West End | Blue | Independent city of St. Louis | | July 31, 1993 |
| Cortex | Blue | Independent city of St. Louis | | July 31, 2018 |
| Grand | Blue | Independent city of St. Louis | | July 31, 1993 |
| Union Station | Blue | Independent city of St. Louis | | July 31, 1993 |
| Civic Center | Blue Green (planned) | Independent city of St. Louis | | July 31, 1993 |
| Stadium | Blue | Independent city of St. Louis | | July 31, 1993 |
| 8th & Pine | Blue | Independent city of St. Louis | | July 31, 1993 |
| Convention Center | Blue | Independent city of St. Louis | | July 31, 1993 |
| Laclede's Landing | Blue | Independent city of St. Louis | | July 31, 1993 |
| East Riverfront | Blue | East St. Louis | St. Clair County | May 14, 1994 |
| 5th & Missouri | Blue | East St. Louis | St. Clair County | July 31, 1993 |
| Emerson Park | Blue | East St. Louis | St. Clair County | May 5, 2001 |
| Jackie Joyner-Kersee Center | Blue | East St. Louis | St. Clair County | May 5, 2001 |
| Washington Park | Blue | East St. Louis | St. Clair County | May 5, 2001 |
| Fairview Heights | Blue | Fairview Heights | St. Clair County | May 5, 2001 |
| Memorial Hospital | | Belleville | St. Clair County | May 5, 2001 |
| Swansea | | Swansea | St. Clair County | May 5, 2001 |
| Belleville | | Belleville | St. Clair County | May 5, 2001 |
| College | | Belleville | St. Clair County | May 5, 2001 |
| Shiloh–Scott | | Shiloh | St. Clair County | June 23, 2003 |

=== Operations ===
The Red Line operates on 20 minute headways beginning at 4:16 A.M. for eastbound trains, which originate from Washington Park, and at 3:58 A.M. for westbound trains, which originate at Jackie Joyner-Kersee Center. The final four eastbound trains terminate at different stations: 12:30 A.M. at Fairview Heights, 12:40 A.M at Emerson Park, and 12:47 A.M and 1:27 A.M. at Civic Center. The final westbound train terminates at Fairview Heights at 12:55 A.M.

== Public artwork ==
In the initial design phase of MetroLink, Metro's Arts in Transit program commissioned a group of artists to design unique bridge piers for MetroLink viaducts. Collaborating with architects and engineers, the artists designed the arched supports that reflect an inverted version of the arch motif used throughout the MetroLink system. The bridge pier style is a signature of MetroLink design and appears in the subsequent St. Clair and Cross County extensions.

In 2008, the Arts in Transit program commissioned a work for the alignment along Interstate 70 near Lambert Airport. Titled St. Louis Rhythm and created by Richard Elliot, it was made using roadway reflectors on 16 concrete Jersey barriers that are activated by the headlights of passing cars.

In 2011, another Arts in Transit commission was installed on the shared alignment near Interstate 64 on the bridge over Vandeventer Avenue. Titled Blue Train and created by Clark Wiegman, a cubist locomotive represents the opening eight bars of the melody of “St. Louis Blues.” During the day, this piece appears as a locomotive spewing a trail of notes or an unfurling piano roll. At night, it becomes a geometric abstraction about linear dynamism and the implied form of the bridge punching through the surrounding ambient light.

== Projects in progress ==
=== MidAmerica Airport extension ===
In 2019, the St. Clair County Transit District was awarded $96 million in Illinois infrastructure funding to build a 5.2-mile (8.4 km) extension of the Red Line from Shiloh-Scott to MidAmerica St. Louis Airport in Mascoutah. This extension will include two 2.6-mile (4.2 km) segments, a double-track and a single-track segment, along with a station at the airport. Construction on the extension began in 2023 with Metro expecting to begin operations in early 2026.

=== System rehabilitation ===
In 2023, Metro began a system-wide rehabilitation program that will last several years. Work on the Red Line will include the rehabilitation of the downtown and Union Station subway tunnels, including the 8th & Pine, Convention Center and Laclede's Landing stations. Elsewhere, catenary wire, curve tracks, platforms, retaining walls, staircases, and system conduit are to be upgraded or replaced.

In 2026, Metro expects to complete upgrades to the Supervisory Control Automated Data Acquisition (SCADA) and Public Address/Customer Information (PA/CIS) systems. The upgraded SCADA/PA/CIS will operate as an integrated system that monitors and controls operations and will allow Metro to provide real-time arrival information to passengers, such as live displays at stations.

== Previous proposals ==
Previously proposed extensions of the Red Line are defunct; regional leaders have said their priority is the proposed Green Line expansion in the city of St. Louis.

=== St. Charles County ===
A plan to expand MetroLink 16–20 miles (26–32 km) from St. Louis Lambert International Airport northwest to St. Charles County was abandoned after St. Charles County voters twice rejected a sales tax for the extension in 1996; subsequently, all MetroBus service was ended. Had the extension been funded, the route would have used the Old St. Charles Bridge (now demolished) over the Missouri River to access the county.

== See also ==
- Bi-State Development Agency
- Blue Line (MetroLink)
- Green Line (MetroLink)
- Metro Transit
- St. Clair County Transit District
- List of St. Louis MetroLink stations
