= Green Line (St. Louis MetroLink) =

Future bus rapid transit line in St. Louis, Missouri

Overview
- Other name(s): Jefferson Alignment; Northside/Southside
- Status: Planned
- Owner: Bi-State Development Agency
- Locale: St. Louis, Missouri
- Termini: Goodfellow Boulevard; Meramec Street
- Stations: 23
- Website: greenlinebrt.com

Service
- Type: Bus rapid transit (initially proposed as Light rail)
- System: St. Louis MetroLink / MetroBus
- Operator: Metro Transit

Technical
- Line length: 11.5 mi (18.5 km)
- Character: At-grade street running

The Green Line is a planned at-grade bus rapid transit (BRT) line in St. Louis, Missouri. The 11.5-mile (18.5 km) line will run between Goodfellow Boulevard near the northwest city limits and Meramec Street in Dutchtown along Natural Bridge Avenue, North Florissant Avenue, Tucker Boulevard, Chouteau Avenue, and South Jefferson Avenue. The line will feature 23 platform level ADA-accessible stations, dedicated center bus lanes, off‑board fare collection, transit signal priority at intersections, and real‑time arrival information.

The north–south line was formerly studied since 2000 as an expansion of the MetroLink light rail system as a street running light rail line, however the planned mode was replaced with BRT in late 2025 due to budgetary constraints.

== History ==
The need for a north/south MetroLink line was first identified during the East-West Gateway Council of Governments three corridor study in the year 2000. Officials identified a northern locally preferred alternative (LPA) that would have connected downtown St. Louis to St. Louis Community College at Florissant Valley that would have cost $485.5 million. Additionally, a southern LPA was recommended to connect downtown St. Louis with Cross County Segment 2 via Union Pacific's right-of-way and a new busway between Chouteau and Loughborough avenues. Despite recommending alternatives, local officials never moved these routes beyond the study phase. However, these suggestions would become the basis for future north/south transit planning in the St. Louis region.

In 2008, staff at East-West Gateway recommended three new LPAs for a north/south MetroLink line. The northern LPA would have run from 14th Street to a park-and-ride lot at Goodfellow Boulevard near Interstate 70. The central LPA would have connected the northern and southern sections with a couplet on 9th and 10th streets in downtown St. Louis. The southern LPA would have run from 14th Street to a park-and-ride lot at Bayless via Jefferson Avenue and Interstate 55. After St. Louis County voters defeated Proposition M in November 2008, all MetroLink expansion plans were shelved.

In 2017, St. Louis City voters passed Proposition 1, a half-cent sales tax estimated to generate about $12 million per year for MetroLink expansion. The following year, East-West Gateway staff recommended an updated north/south LPA that would shorten the route to run between North Grand Boulevard and Chippewa Street via a couplet on 9th and 10th streets in downtown St. Louis. This route would have added 19 stations and cost approximately $667 million.

In 2022, Bi-State Development approved an intergovernmental agreement with St. Louis County and the City of St. Louis allowing the parties to move forward on an expanded Northside-Southside MetroLink corridor study.

In September 2023, Bi-State's board approved a four-year, $18.9 million contract with the joint venture Northside-Southside Transit Partners to provide consulting services for the design phase of the project. In February 2024, the East-West Gateway Council of Governments approved the updated locally preferred alternative along Jefferson thereby allowing the region to apply for federal funding.

The 5.8-mile (9.3 km) route would serve about 10 stations between Chippewa Street in South St. Louis and Grand Boulevard in North St. Louis running primarily on Jefferson Avenue. It would provide a fixed rail upgrade to Metro's #11 (Chippewa) and #4 (Natural Bridge) bus routes. The 2023 design study estimates 5,000 daily boardings, $8-9 million in annual operating costs, and $1.1 billion in capital costs. Metro planned to expand the Ewing Yard and Shops to maintain light rail vehicles for the proposed expansion.

In April 2025, Bi-State announced that St. Louis mayor Cara Spencer had requested a pause in further planning for the Green Line project until a review of viability and competitiveness was completed.

In September 2025, the proposal for building a new light rail line was scrapped due to budgetary constraints. However, planning for the line itself had not been terminated, and a new study was undertaken that would review the feasibility of bus rapid transit.

In June 2026, after 9 months of additional study and route selection processes, East-West Gateway recommended a slightly altered and lengthened north-south, 11.5-mile (18.5 km) alignment that features 23 stations and connects directly to Downtown and MetroLink at Civic Center. The project was estimated to cost between $360 million and $590 million and have a projected ridership of 1,300,000 trips per year.

== Route ==
The 11.5-mile (18.5 km) route would begin at the intersection of Natural Bridge Avenue and Goodfellow Boulevard, continuing east past Fairground Park with seven stations along Natural Bridge, and then south on North Florissant Avenue with stations at St. Louis Avenue, Madison Street, and Cass Avenue before entering downtown St. Louis. Downtown stations include Carr Street, Washington Avenue, Pine Street and Civic Center where a transfer between the Red and Blue MetroLink lines can be made. Continuing south on 18th Street from Clark Avenue with a stop at the intersection of Chouteau Avenue, the line turns south at South Jefferson Avenue with seven more stations at Park Avenue, Russell Boulevard, Gravois Avenue, Arsenal Street, Cherokee Street, Chippewa Street, and finally terminates at Meramec Street.

=== Stations ===
From Goodfellow to Meramec (north to south)

Station	Connections
Goodfellow	90
Union	13
Kingshighway	95
Marcus	-
Newstead	18
Fair Ave	42
Grand	70
Jefferson/Natural Bridge	4, 41
St. Louis	19
Madison	-
Cass	32
Carr	-
Washington	19, 32
Pine	19
Civic Center	MetroLink: Red Blue; Amtrak: Lincoln Service, Missouri River Runner, Texas Eagle (at Gateway Transportation Center); MetroBus: 4, 10, 11, 19, 30, 31, 32, 40, 41, 73, 74, 94, 97; Madison County Transit: 1X, 5, 14X, 16X; Greyhound Lines, Amtrak Thruway (at Gateway Transportation Center)
Chouteau/18th	31
Park	-
Russell	-
Gravois	10
Arsenal	30
Cherokee	8
Chippewa	8, 73
Meramec	8, 73

== Future extension ==
An extension of the Green Line into North St. Louis County had been explored. In 2023, four alternatives were proposed that would have continued the line from the Grand/Fairground station along Natural Bridge Avenue toward the county. By 2024, County leadership had rejected all four routes primarily due to the unfunded 3-mile (4.8 km) gap between the Grand/Fairground station and the county line. Additionally, concerns were raised about federal funding, ridership, right-of-way constraints and other factors. Instead, county leaders are exploring alternatives for North County such as light rail branching off the existing Red Line near the University of Missouri–St. Louis, rapid bus service or a hybrid of the four 2023 alternatives.

Those 2023 alternatives were:

1. Goodfellow/West Florissant. This route would continue along Natural Bridge Avenue, turn north on Goodfellow Boulevard and then head northwest along West Florissant Avenue ending at the North County Transit Center.
2. Jennings Stations/Halls Ferry. This route would continue along Natural Bridge Avenue, turn north on Jennings Station Road and then head northwest along Halls Ferry Road ending at the North County Transit Center.
3. Lucas-Hunt/Halls Ferry. This route would continue along Natural Bridge Avenue, turn north on Lucas-Hunt Road and then head northwest along Halls Ferry Road ending at the North County Transit Center.
4. Natural Bridge/Florissant. This route would continue along Natural Bridge Avenue with a transfer to the existing Red Line at the UMSL–North station. The route would then continue north through Ferguson on Florissant Road ending at Hereford Avenue.

== See also ==
- Bi-State Development Agency
- Blue Line (MetroLink)
- Red Line (MetroLink)
- Metro Transit
- List of St. Louis MetroLink stations
