= Wellston =

Wellston is the name of several places in the United States of America:

- Wellston, Georgia, former name of Warner Robins, Georgia
- Wellston, Michigan
- Wellston, Missouri
- Wellston, Ohio
- Wellston, Oklahoma
- Wellston station, a train station in St. Louis, Missouri
