= Rock Road station =

Light rail station in St. Louis County, Missouri, US

Rock Road
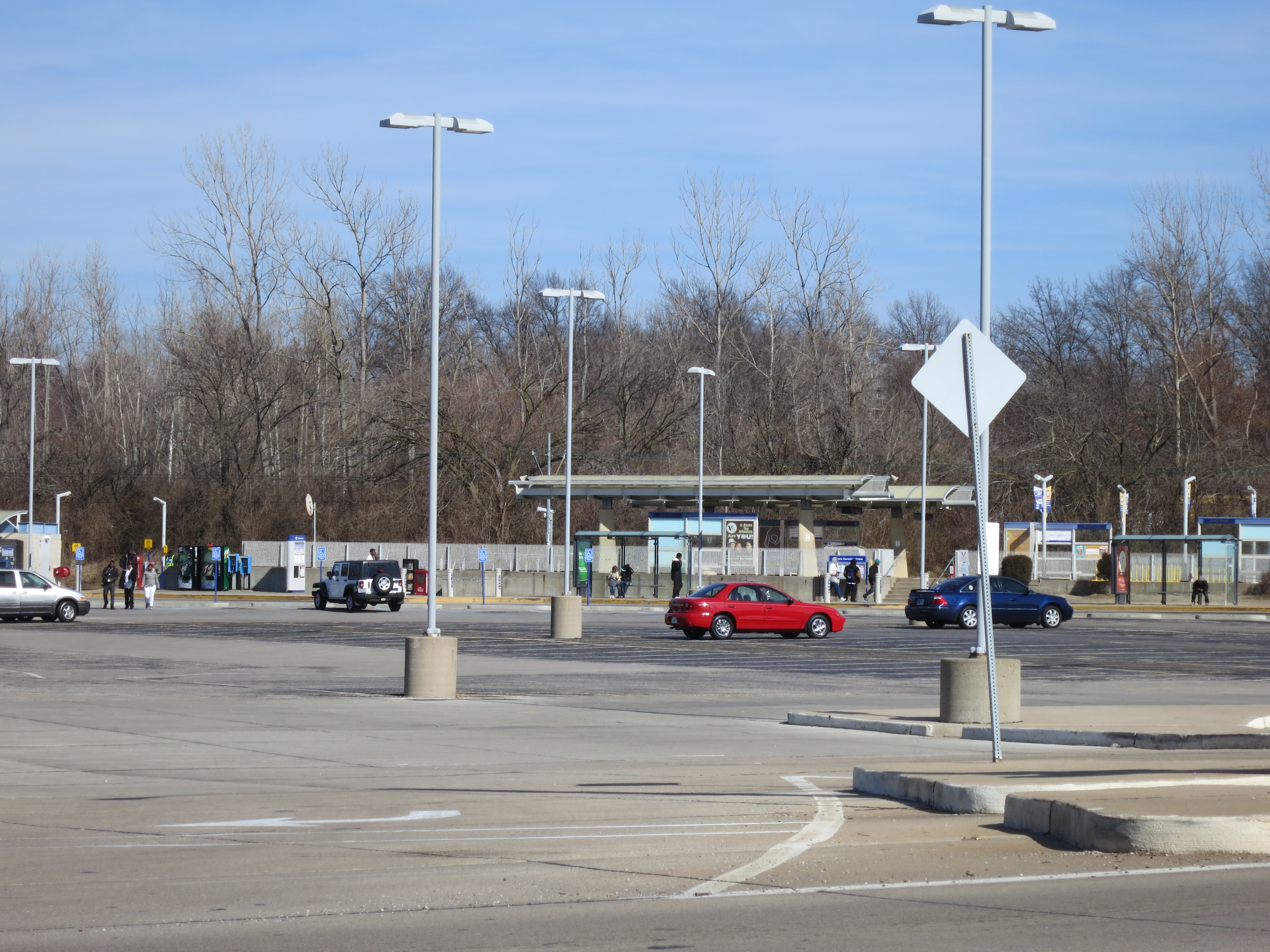
- Rock Road station

General information
- Location: 7019 St. Charles Rock Road; Pagedale, Missouri
- Coordinates: 38.685215°N 90.301411°W
- Owner: Bi-State Development
- Operator: Metro Transit
- Platforms: 2 side platforms
- Tracks: 2
- Bus stands: 5
- Connections: MetroBus Missouri: 02, 19, 32, 35, 64

Construction
- Structure type: At-grade
- Parking: 191 spaces
- Cycle facilities: St. Vincent Greenway
- Accessible: Yes

History
- Opened: July 31, 1993
- Rebuilt: 2024

Passengers
- 2018: 1,408 daily
- Rank: 9 out of 38

Services
Preceding station	MetroLink	Following station
UMSL–South toward Lambert Airport Terminal 1	Red Line	Wellston toward Shiloh–Scott
Location

Rock Road station is a light rail station on the Red Line of the St. Louis MetroLink system. This at-grade station primarily serves commuters with a large MetroBus transfer and 191 park and ride spaces located in Pagedale, Missouri. The station's name comes from nearby St. Charles Rock Road, an important east–west artery in St. Louis County.

In 2023, Great Rivers Greenway completed a .83-mile (1.34 km) extension to the St. Vincent Greenway between this station and St. Vincent County Park. The greenway parallels St. Charles Rock Road and was built in conjunction with improvements to that corridor by the Missouri Department of Transportation.

In April 2024, Metro announced a platform improvement project at Rock Road. Both platforms were repaired and resurfaced with the work lasting about four weeks.

== Station layout ==
The eastbound platform is accessed via stairs and a ramp from the bus boarding area. The westbound platform is accessed via a ramp after crossing both tracks.

== Bus connections ==
The following MetroBus lines serve Rock Road station:

- 02 Red
- 19 St. Louis Avenue
- 32 Dr. M.L. King
- 35 Rock Road
- 64 Lucas-Hunt

== Public artwork ==
In 2010, Metro's Arts in Transit program commissioned the work Honey, Where’s my Metro Pass? by Nick Lang and Thad Duhigg for this station. Some of Lang's students visited the Rock Road location and noted the common objects used by commuters. After documenting these visits, the students created maquettes that laid the groundwork for the sculpture. The artists expanded on the students’ ideas and fabricated this sculpture, which depicts the contents of an average Metro rider’s pockets at a very large scale.

== Notable places nearby ==
- Normandy High School
- St. Vincent Greenway
