= UMSL–South station =

Light rail station in St. Louis County, Missouri, US

UMSL–South
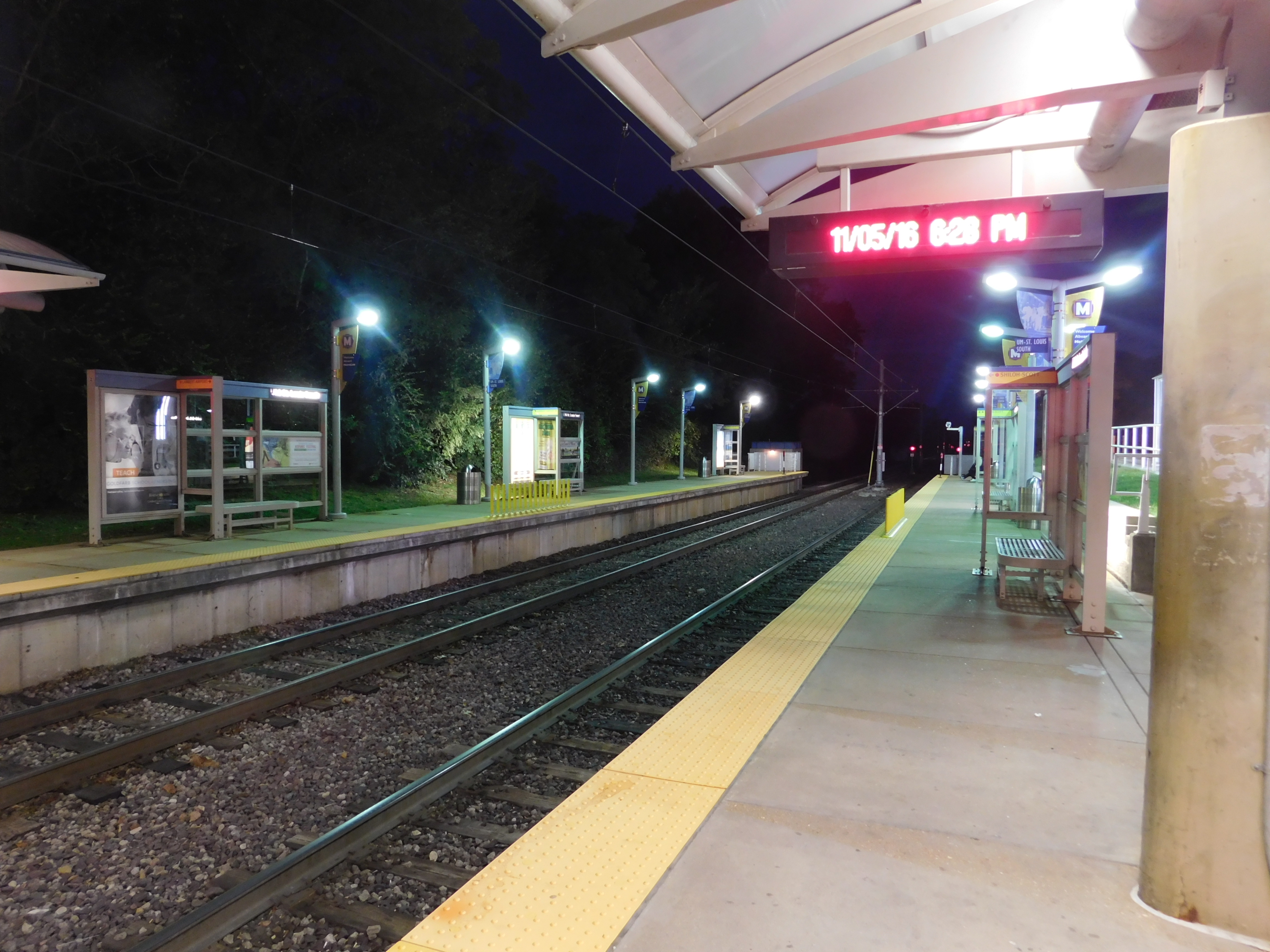
- UMSL–South station platform in November 2016

General information
- Location: 7798 Natural Bridge Road; Normandy, Missouri
- Coordinates: 38.705325°N 90.305251°W
- Owner: Bi-State Development
- Operator: Metro Transit
- Platforms: 2 side platforms
- Tracks: 2
- Bus stands: 4
- Connections: MetroBus Missouri: 04

Construction
- Structure type: At-grade
- Parking: 130 spaces
- Accessible: Yes

History
- Opened: July 31, 1993

Passengers
- 2018: 516 daily
- Rank: 29 out of 38

Services
Preceding station	MetroLink	Following station
UMSL–North toward Lambert Airport Terminal 1	Red Line	Rock Road toward Shiloh–Scott
Location

UMSL–South station is a light rail station on the Red Line of the St. Louis MetroLink system. This at-grade station is located near East Drive and features 130 park and ride spaces.

In 2023, the United States Department of Agriculture announced it would build a $115 million food safety laboratory next to the station on the site of the former Immaculate Heart Convent. It is expected to open in 2025.

== Station layout ==
The eastbound platform is accessed via a ramp and stairs from the bus boarding area. The westbound platform is accessed via two ramps and crossing over both tracks.

== Public artwork ==
In 2014, Metro's Arts in Transit program commissioned the work Changing Identities by Catharine Magel for this station. Changing Identities honors four individuals killed in a bus crash and reflects on the spiritual and eternal aspects of human nature, our connection to the universe, and our solitary journeys through life.

== Notable places nearby ==
- Glen Echo Country Club
- St. Vincent Greenway
- University of Missouri–St. Louis, South Campus
