= Bi-State Development Agency =

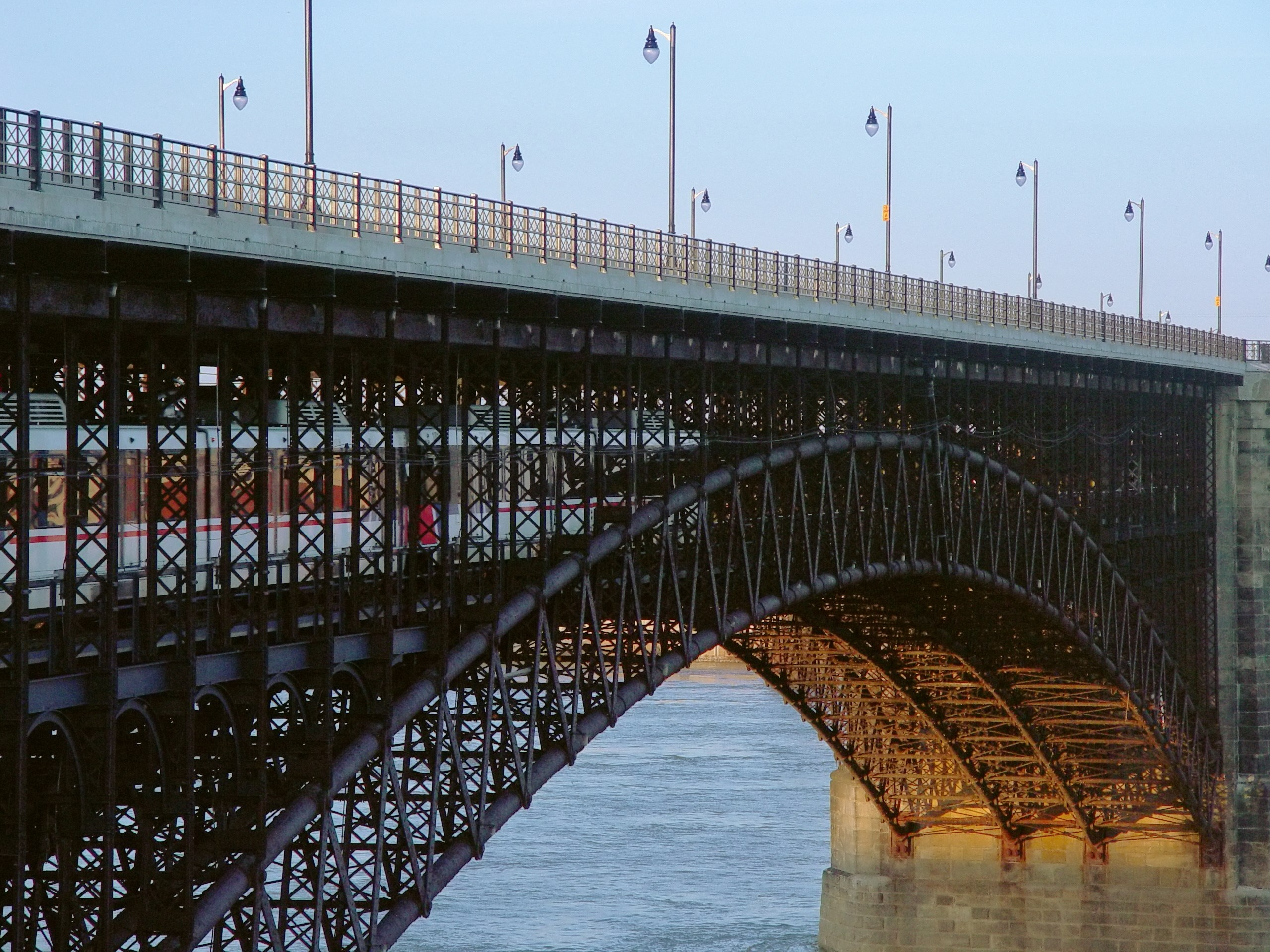
- A MetroLink train crossing the Eads Bridge.
- Formation: September 20, 1949; 76 years ago
- Type: Interstate compact
- Headquarters: One Metropolitan Square; 211 North Broadway; St. Louis, Missouri, 63102, U.S.
- Region served: Greater St. Louis, Missouri–Illinois, U.S.
- Executive Director: Taulby Roach
- Subsidiaries: Gateway Arch Riverfront; Metro Transit; St. Louis Downtown Airport; St. Louis Regional Freightway; BSD Research Institute
- Website: bistatedev.org

The Bi-State Development Agency is an interstate compact established between Missouri and Illinois in 1949. This compact created an organization that has broad powers in seven county-level jurisdictions (St. Louis City, St. Louis, St. Charles and Jefferson counties in Missouri and St. Clair, Madison and Monroe counties in Illinois). Bi-State operates five enterprises, including the Gateway Arch Riverfront, Metro Transit, the St. Louis Downtown Airport, the St. Louis Regional Freightway and the Bi-State Development Research Institute.

== History ==
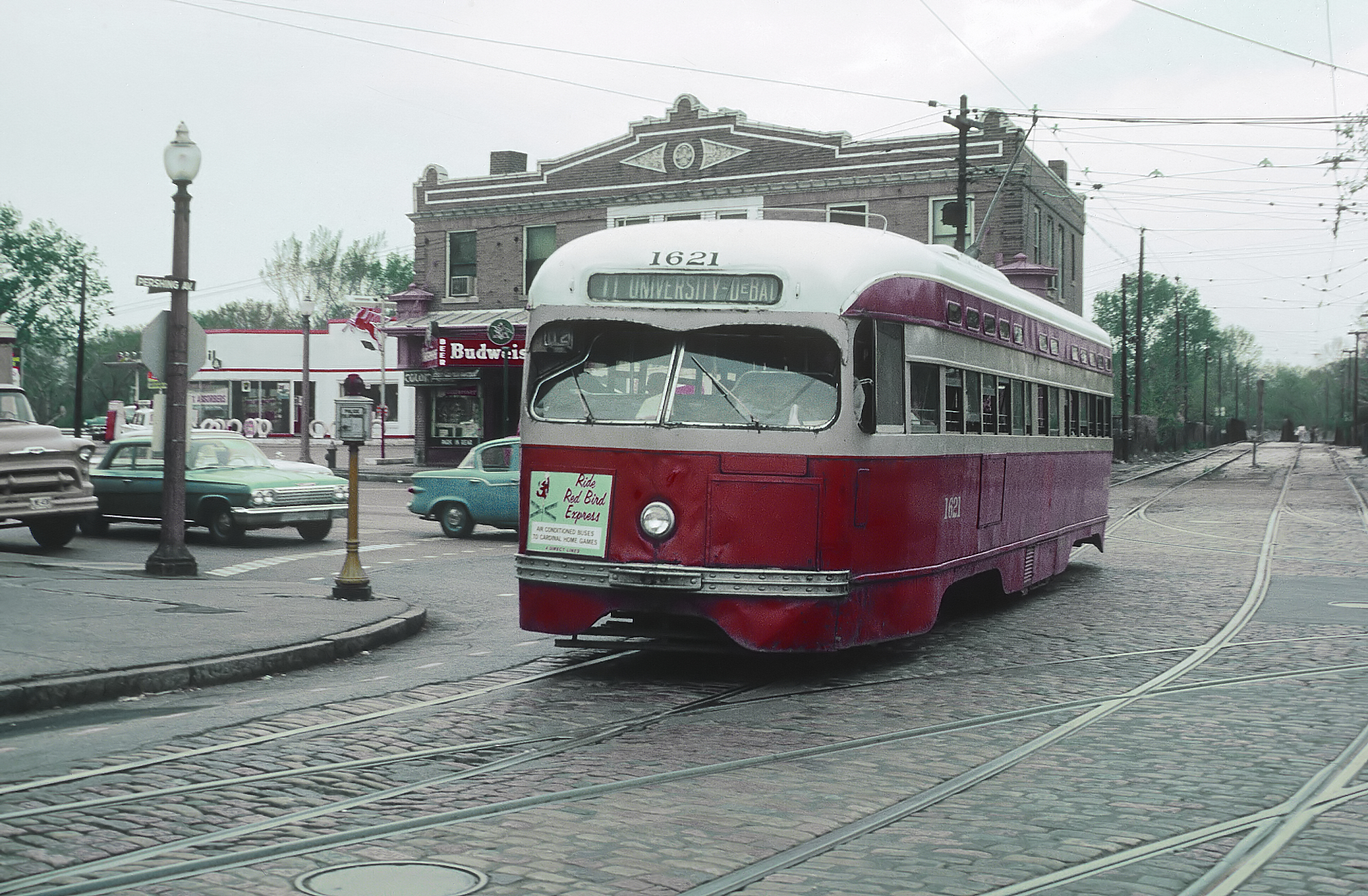
A #11 University-DeBaliviere streetcar on Pershing Avenue in April 1963

Bi-State Development (Bi-State) was established on September 20, 1949, by an interstate compact which was approved by the United States Congress and signed by President Harry S. Truman on August 31, 1950. This compact created an organization that has broad powers in seven county-level jurisdictions, giving Bi-State the ability to plan, construct, maintain, own and operate bridges, tunnels, airports and terminal facilities, plan and establish policies for sewage and drainage facilities and other public projects, and issue bonds and exercise such additional powers as conferred upon it by the legislatures of both states. Funding is received from local, state and federal sources through grant, contract and sales tax revenue. Bi-State does not have taxing authority but is authorized to collect fees from the operation of its facilities.

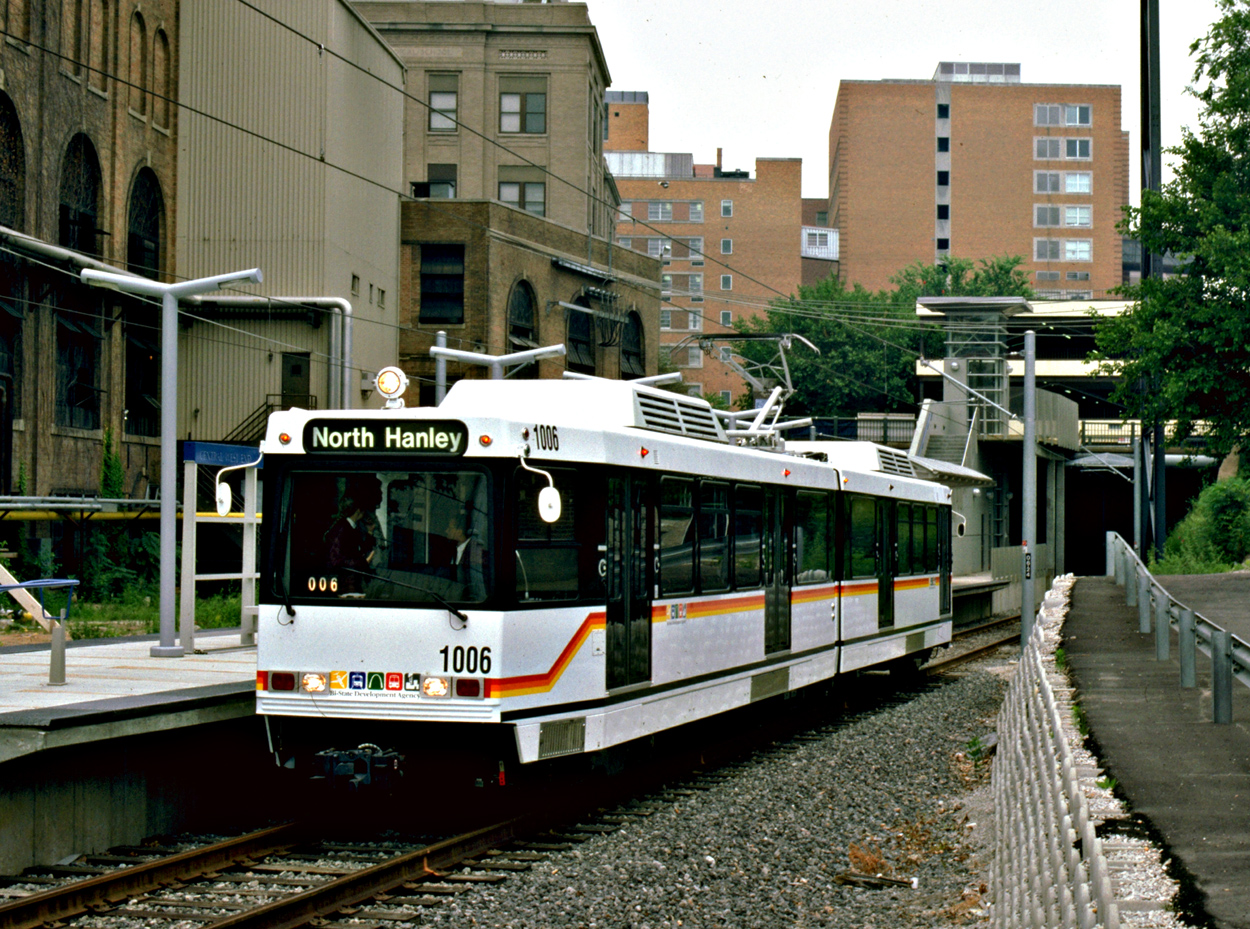
MetroLink with Bi-State branding in 1993

Today, Bi-State is organized as one parent organization with five enterprises including the Gateway Arch Riverfront, Metro Transit, St. Louis Downtown Airport, the St. Louis Regional Freightway and the Bi-State Development Research Institute. In 2003, the agency and its enterprises began operating as Metro. In 2015, the Bi-State Development name would be resurrected for the parent organization and the public transit enterprise renamed Metro Transit.

In 1954, Bi-State completed a study of St. Louis County's sewage system which would lead to the creation of the Metropolitan St. Louis Sewer District in February that same year. In the 1960s, Bi-State facilitated several agreements that would change infrastructure and governance in the St. Louis region. In 1962, Bi-State entered an agreement with the National Park Service that allowed for the construction of the Gateway Arch trams and in 1963, using a $26.5 million bond issue, the firm purchased 15 private transit operators and created the St. Louis region's first unified mass transit system. In 1964, Bi-State purchased the closed Parks Metropolitan Airport in Cahokia Heights, Illinois and reopened it in 1965 as the St. Louis Downtown Airport. That same year, Bi-State was instrumental in the creation of the East-West Gateway Council of Governments, the St. Louis region's metropolitan planning organization (MPO).

In the mid-1970s, Bi-State took over as the regional coordinator for the Port of Metropolitan St. Louis and was one of the first transit operators in the United States to operate wheelchair accessible buses. In 1989, the agency would purchase the historic Eads Bridge during the planning of the area's initial MetroLink light rail line. That first line would open in 1993 and see subsequent expansions in 2001, 2003, and 2006. The St. Louis Regional Freightway was founded in 2015 to enhance the region's network of freight infrastructure and to advance the bi-state area as a freight and multimodal hub.

In February 2022, Bi-State's Board of Commissioners voted to allow Metro Transit to take over operation of the troubled Loop Trolley. In August of the same year, East-West Gateway voted to provide $1.26 million in funding to Metro for long term operation of the trolley. Currently the Loop Trolley operates on a seasonal schedule between April and October.

In 2023, construction began on a 5.2-mile (8.4 km) MetroLink extension to MidAmerica St. Louis Airport in Mascoutah, Illinois with an expected opening in 2026. That same year, Bi-State's board approved a memorandum of understanding authorizing the Bi-State and Metro teams to develop the Green Line MetroLink expansion with the City of St. Louis.

== Enterprises ==
=== Gateway Arch Riverfront ===
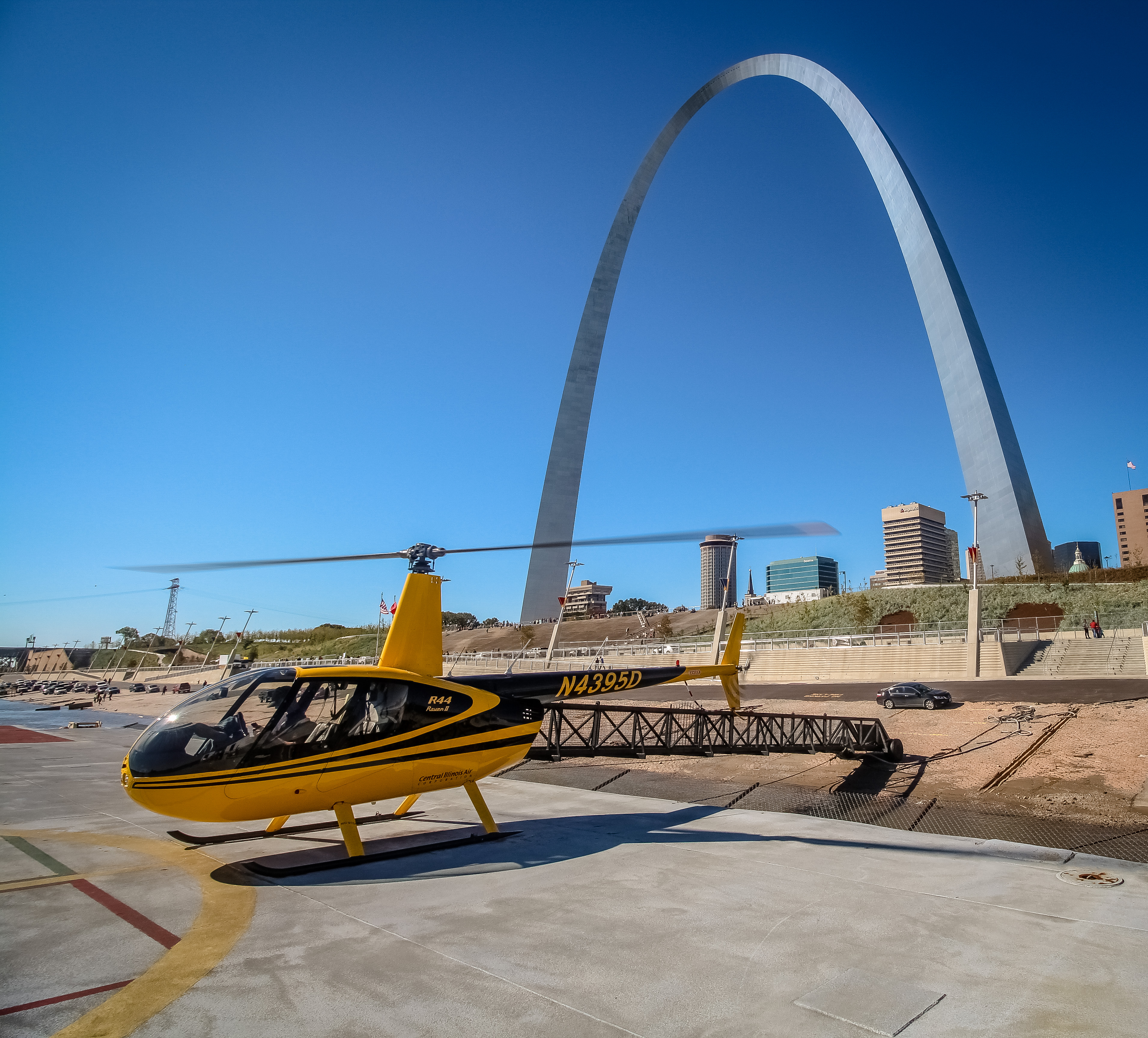
Gateway Helicopter Tours’ barge near the Arch

In 1962, Bi-State entered an agreement with the National Park Service that allowed for the construction of the Gateway Arch trams. Bi-State continues to operate the trams and now operates the Tom Sawyer and Becky Thatcher Riverboats, Gateway Helicopter Tours, and with partners like CityArchRiver, is helping to rehabilitate and update one of the region's primary tourist destinations.

=== Metro Transit ===
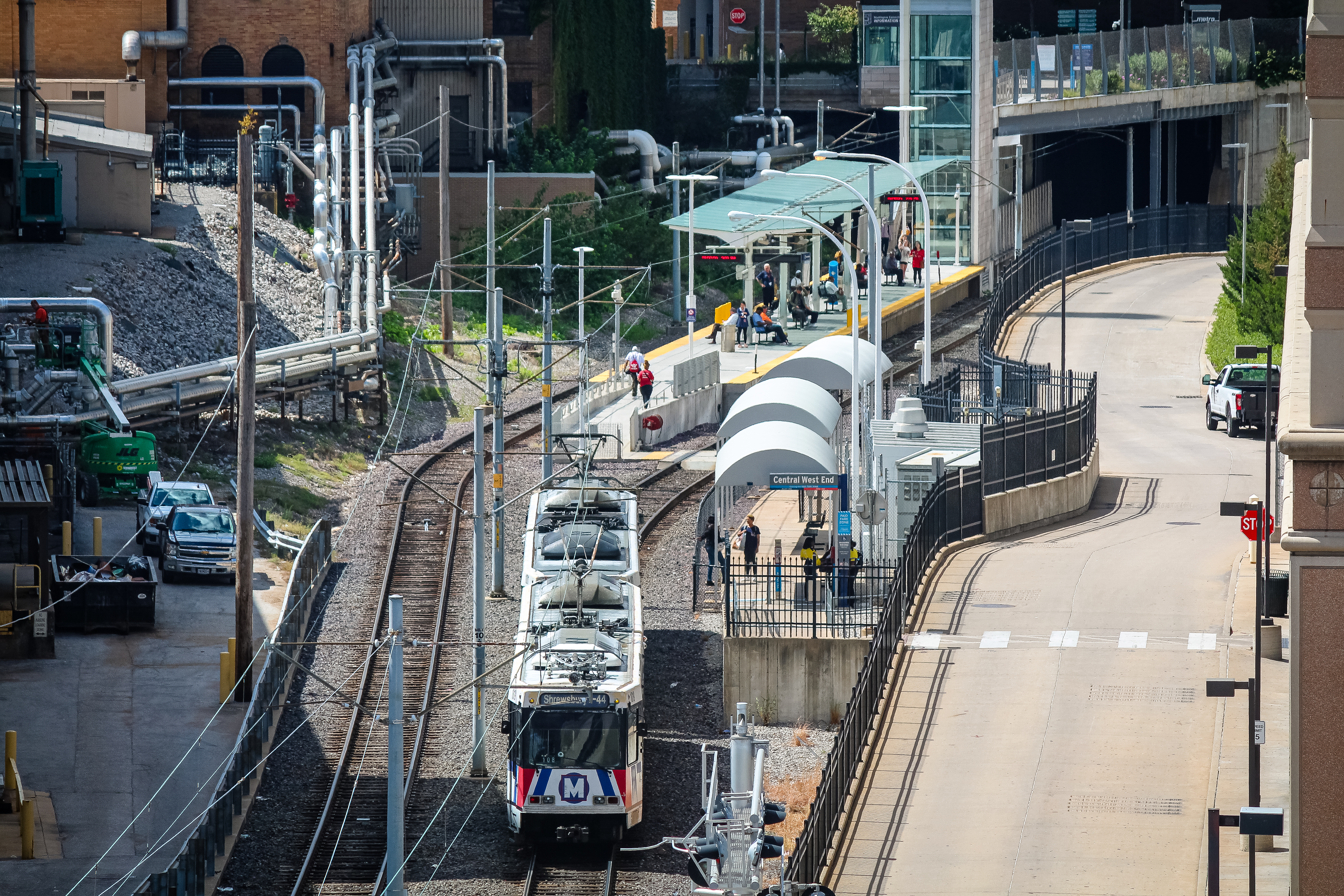
A westbound train arrives at Central West End

Metro Transit was founded in 1963 when Bi-State purchased and consolidated 15 privately owned transit operators to sustain reliable public transportation in the region. In 1990 construction began on the region's initial MetroLink line, with the first 13.9-mile (22.4 km) segment opening on July 31, 1993, between the North Hanley and 5th & Missouri stations. MetroLink would see additional extensions open in 2001, 2003 and 2006. In June 2021, Metro introduced the region's first electric buses including 40-foot and 60-foot articulated models. In 2023, construction began on a 5.2-mile (8.4 km) MetroLink extension to MidAmerica St. Louis Airport in Mascoutah, Illinois with an expected opening in 2026.

=== St. Louis Downtown Airport ===
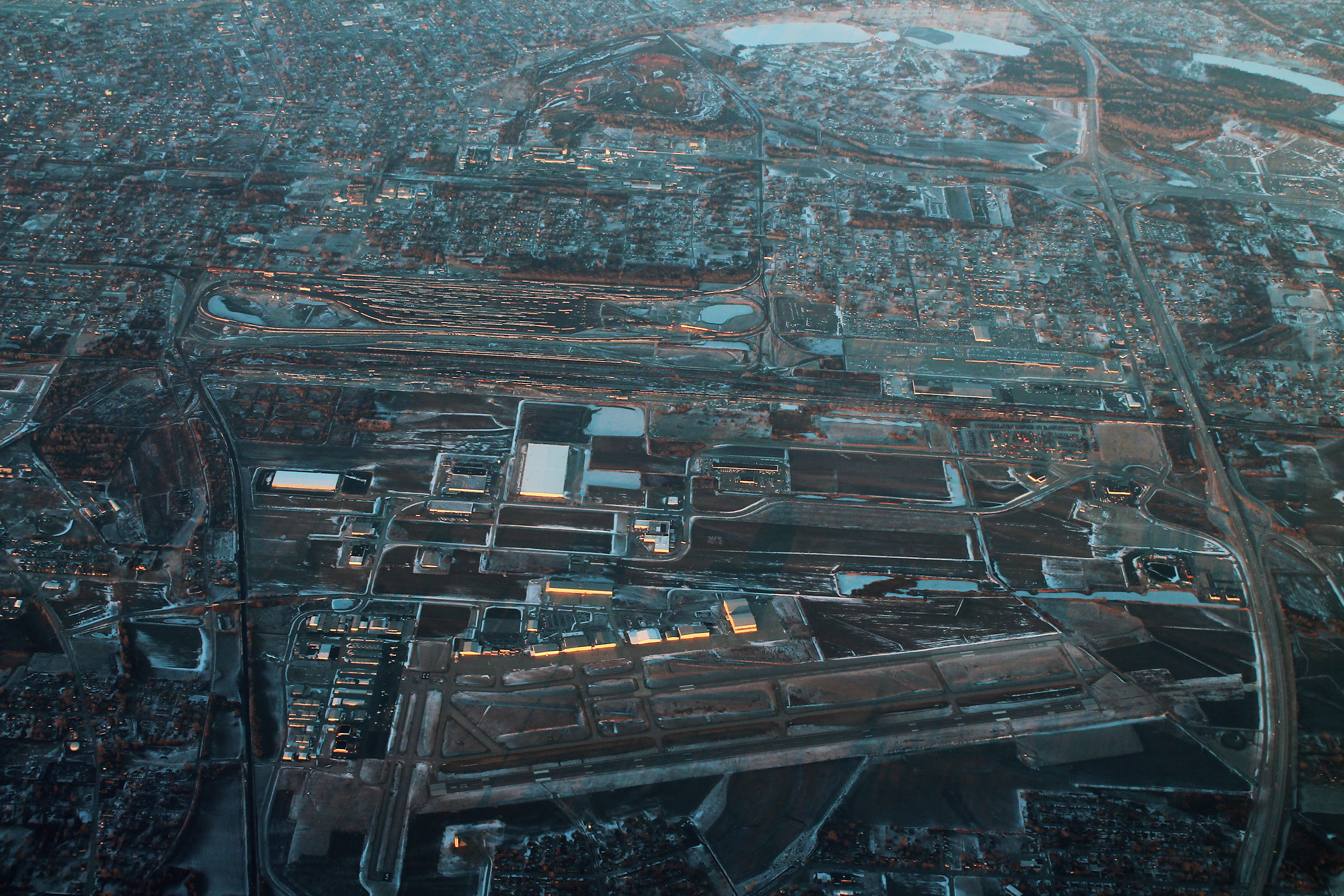
St. Louis Downtown Airport

The airport opened in 1929 as Curtiss-Steinberg Airport and had several names over the years including Curtiss-Parks Airport and Parks Metropolitan Airport. In August 1939, the United States Army Air Forces took over the airport and turned it into a pilot training airfield. The airport would close in 1959 and would reopen in 1965 as Bi-State Parks Airport after Bi-State purchased the closed facility in 1964. It was renamed St. Louis Downtown-Parks Airport in 1984 and received its current name in 1999. In 2023, the airport was awarded a $2.5 million grant to help pay for a new terminal building and a $5.4 million project was completed that included a new Ground Engine Run-Up area and Compass Calibration Pad.

=== St. Louis Regional Freightway ===
The St. Louis Regional Freightway was founded in 2015 to enhance the region's network of freight transportation infrastructure and to advance the bi-state area as a freight and multimodal hub. As of 2020, the region's port system was ranked second for inland port total tonnage according to data from the U.S. Army Corps of Engineers, handling 37.4 million tons of commodities over the course of 2018 (the latest year for which data was available). The region's port system also ranked first as the most efficient inland port district in the U.S. in terms of tons moved per river mile.

== Governance ==
Bi-State Development is led by a 10-member Board of Commissioners that sets policy and direction for the organization. The governor of Missouri appoints five commissioners and the chairman of the board for both St. Clair and Madison Counties in Illinois appoint five commissioners. All commissioners must be resident voters of their respective state and must reside within the Bi-State Metropolitan District. Each term is for five years and each serves without compensation.

Bi-State Development Board of Commissioners
President & CEO: Taulby Roach
Missouri Commissioners	Illinois Commissioners
Vernal Brown - Commissioner; Sam Gladney - Vice Chair; Nate K. Johnson - Secretary; Fred P. Pestello - Commissioner; Rose Windmiller - Commissioner	Terry Beach - Treasurer; Derrick Cox - Commissioner; Irma Golliday - Commissioner; Debra Moore - Commissioner; Herbert Simmons - Chair

== See also ==
- Loop Trolley
- MetroBus
- MetroLink
- Transportation in St. Louis
