= 5th & Missouri station =

Light rail station in St. Clair County, Illinois, US

5th & Missouri

General information
- Location: 150 North 5th Street; East St. Louis, Illinois
- Coordinates: 38.625012°N 90.159444°W
- Owner: Bi-State Development
- Operator: Metro Transit
- Platforms: 1 island platform
- Tracks: 2
- Bus stands: 7
- Connections: MetroBus Illinois: 01, 02, 03, 04, 05

Construction
- Structure type: At-grade
- Parking: 322 spaces
- Accessible: Yes

History
- Opened: July 31, 1993

Passengers
- 2018: 1,323 daily
- Rank: 11 out of 38

Services
Preceding station	MetroLink	Following station
East Riverfront toward Shrewsbury–Lansdowne I-44	Blue Line	Emerson Park toward Fairview Heights
East Riverfront toward Lambert Airport Terminal 1	Red Line	Emerson Park toward Shiloh–Scott
Location

5th & Missouri station is a light rail station on the Red and Blue lines of the St. Louis MetroLink system. This at-grade station is located in the former 5th Street right-of-way between Broadway and Missouri Avenue in downtown East St. Louis, Illinois.

The station also serves as a MetroBus transfer and features 322 park and ride spaces.

In 2023, the area between the bus bays and MetroLink entrance was updated with landscaping and other elements in a “City of Champions” theme, including a large shade structure, seating, a gathering space, and artwork. The fifth "Transit Stop Transformation" project to be completed, it was unveiled on July 25, 2023 by Citizens for Modern Transit, AARP in St. Louis, and Metro Transit in partnership with several local agencies.

== Station layout ==
The island platform is accessed via a single ramp on its east end that connects to the bus boarding area.

== Bus connections ==
The following MetroBus lines serve 5th & Missouri station:

- 01 Main Street-State Street
- 02 Cahokia Heights
- 03 Sauget-Water Street
- 04 19th & Central
- 05 Missouri Avenue-M.L. King

== Notable places nearby ==
- Broadview Hotel
- Spivey Building
