= UMSL–North station =

Light rail station in St. Louis County, Missouri, US

UMSL–North
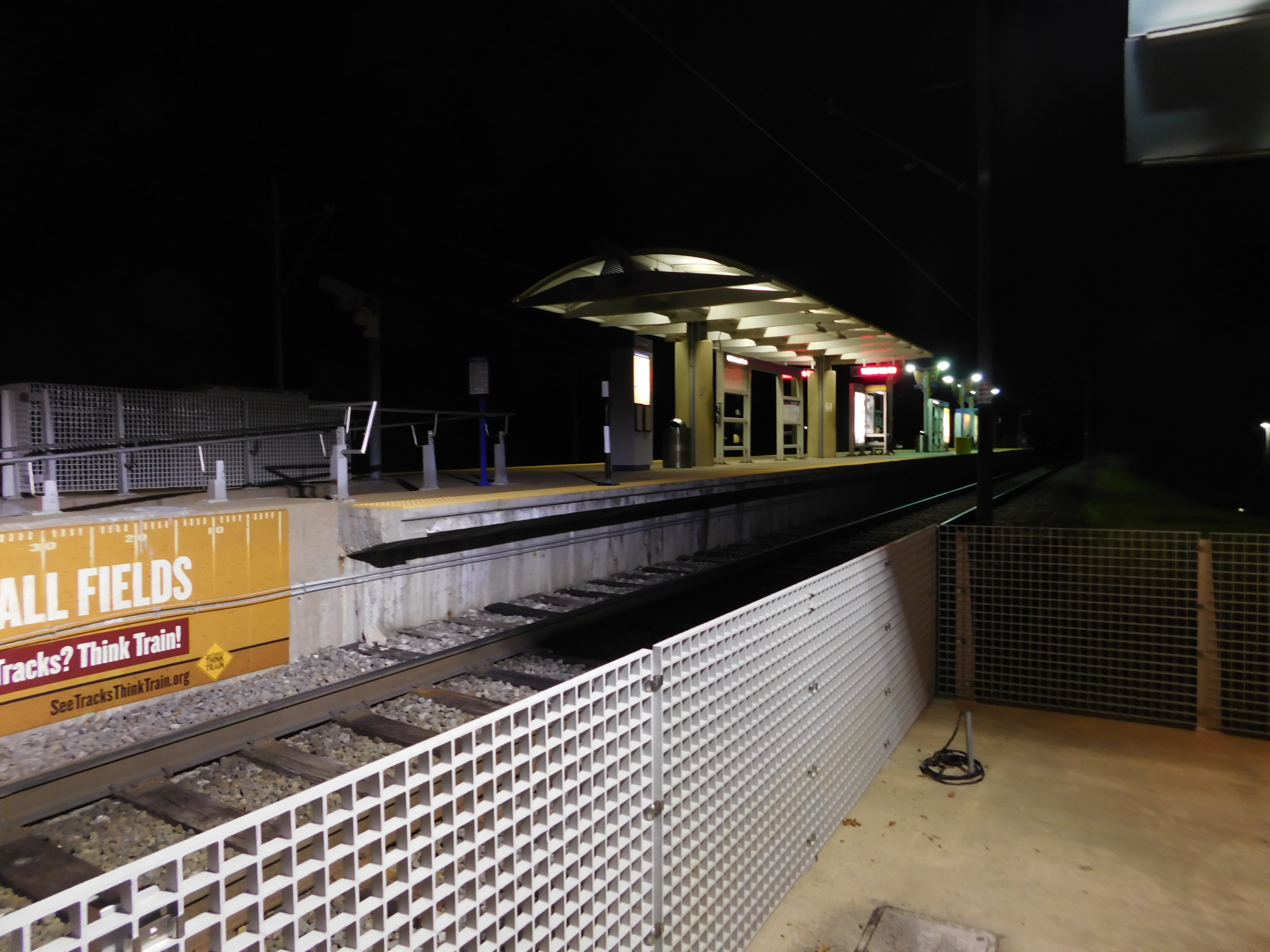
- UMSL–North platform

General information
- Location: 8298 Bellerive Drive; Normandy, Missouri
- Coordinates: 38.713118°N 90.306588°W
- Owner: Bi-State Development
- Operator: Metro Transit
- Platforms: 1 island platform
- Tracks: 2

Construction
- Structure type: Embankment
- Accessible: Yes

History
- Opened: July 31, 1993

Passengers
- 2018: 385 daily
- Rank: 33 out of 38

Services
| Preceding station | MetroLink | Following station |
|---|---|---|
| North Hanley toward Lambert Airport Terminal 1 | Red Line | UMSL–South toward Shiloh–Scott |
Location

UMSL–North station is a light rail station on the Red Line of the St. Louis MetroLink system. This station is located on an embankment near Arnold B. Grobman Drive and the Ted Jones Trail.

== Station layout ==
The station is located between two elevated viaducts, just east of the UMSL Campus Tunnel. It is accessed via sidewalks from UMSL's Parking Lot F.

== Notable places nearby ==
- Blanche M. Touhill Performing Arts Center
- St. Vincent Greenway
- University of Missouri–St. Louis, North Campus
