= Lambert Airport Terminal 2 station =

Light rail station in St. Louis County, Missouri, US

Lambert Airport - Terminal 2
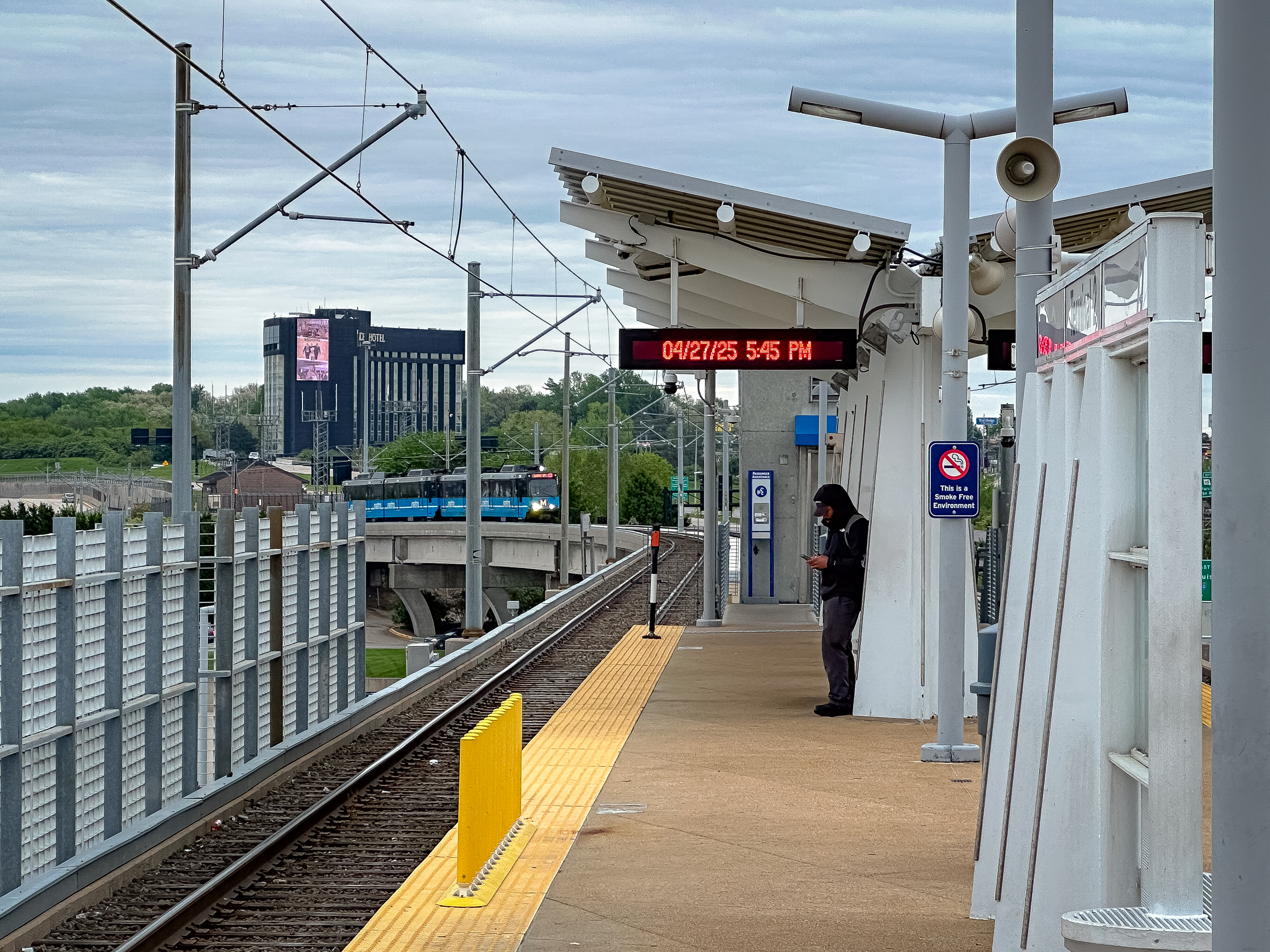
- A Red Line train approaching the Terminal 2 platform

General information
- Location: 10101 Lambert International Boulevard; Woodson Terrace, Missouri
- Coordinates: 38.736472°N 90.356616°W
- Owner: Bi-State Development
- Operator: Metro Transit
- Platforms: 1 island platform
- Tracks: 2

Construction
- Structure type: Elevated
- Accessible: Yes

History
- Opened: December 23, 1998
- Former names: Lambert Airport East

Passengers
- 2018: 380 daily
- Rank: 34 out of 38

Services
Preceding station	MetroLink	Following station
Lambert Airport Terminal 1 Terminus	Red Line	North Hanley toward Shiloh–Scott
Location

Lambert Airport Terminal 2 station is a light rail station on the Red Line of the St. Louis MetroLink system. This elevated station is located above Lambert International Boulevard and is connected to the Terminal 2 parking garage at St. Louis Lambert International Airport.

== Station layout ==
The platform is accessed via the departure (upper) level of the Terminal 2 parking garage. A set of stairs and a ramp take passengers from the garage to the station's elevator and platform stairs. There is also access from the sidewalk on Lambert International Boulevard.
