= Wellston station =

Light rail station in St. Louis County, Missouri, US

Wellston
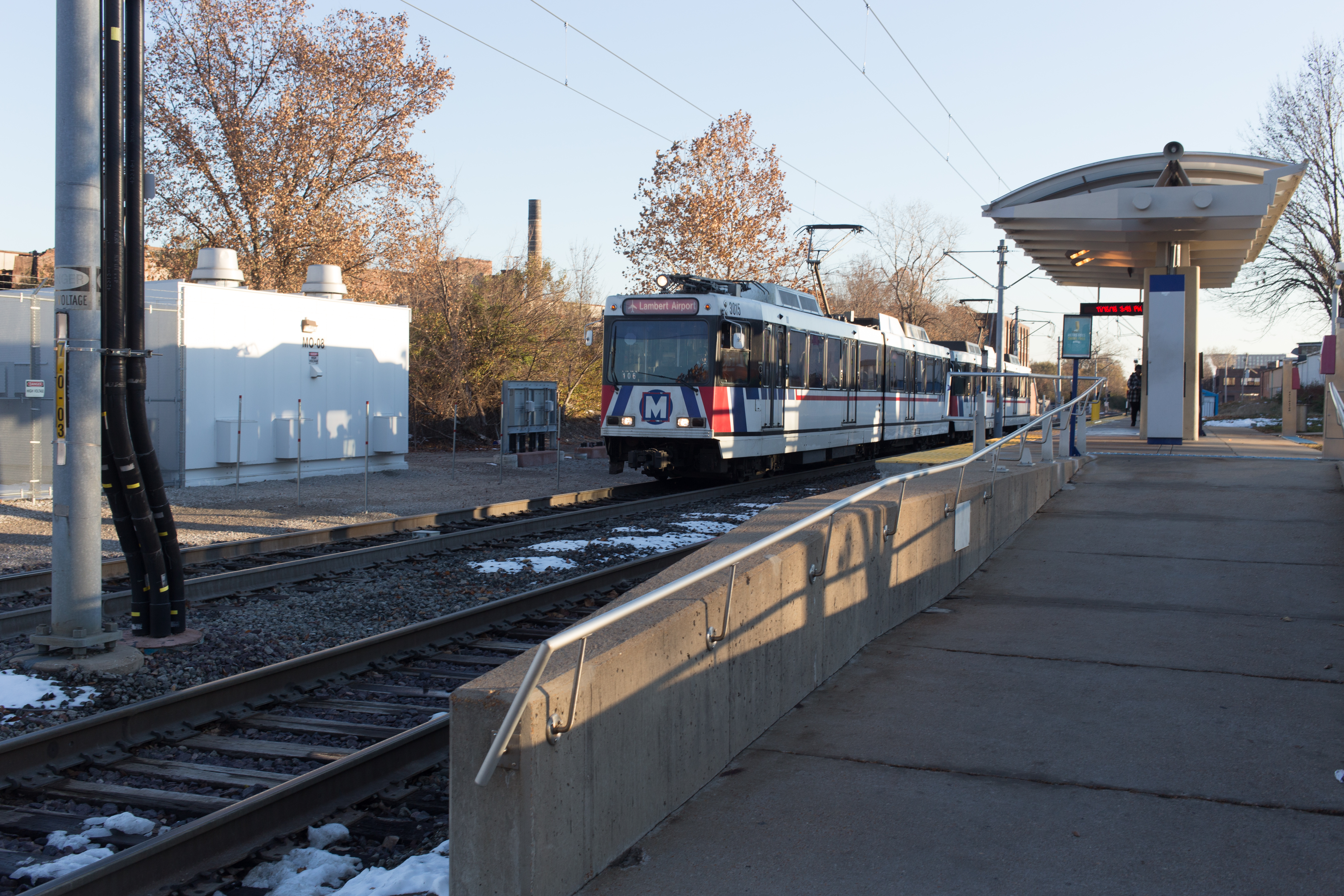
- Wellston station eastbound platform with a passing westbound train, November 2018

General information
- Location: 6402 Plymouth Avenue; Wellston, Missouri
- Coordinates: 38.668867°N 90.298377°W
- Owner: Bi-State Development
- Operator: Metro Transit
- Platforms: 2 side platforms
- Tracks: 2
- Connections: MetroBus Missouri: 94

Construction
- Structure type: At-grade
- Parking: 242 spaces
- Cycle facilities: Rack, St. Vincent Greenway
- Accessible: Yes

History
- Opened: July 31, 1993

Passengers
- 2018: 848 daily
- Rank: 21 out of 38

Services
Preceding station	MetroLink	Following station
Rock Road toward Lambert Airport Terminal 1	Red Line	Delmar Loop toward Shiloh–Scott
Location

Wellston station is a light rail station on the Red Line of the St. Louis MetroLink system. An at-grade station with 243 park-and-ride spaces, it primarily serves commuters. The station's name reflects its location: the inner-ring suburb of Wellston, Missouri.

In 2023, Great Rivers Greenway completed a .53-mile (0.85 km) extension to the St. Vincent Greenway between Trojan Park and Robert L. Powell Place. The greenway parallels Stephen Jones Avenue and then Plymouth Avenue where it connects with this station.

== Station layout ==
Wellston is the only MetroLink station with split platforms. The westbound platform is north of Plymouth Avenue while the eastbound platform is to the south. Each platform can be reached via a ramp from Plymouth.

== Public art ==
In 2013, Metro's Arts in Transit program commissioned the work Everyone Appreciates a Punctual Train by Mary Lucking for this station. The bronze figurines represent animals, unconcerned with schedules, who live by the natural rhythms set by the sun and the seasons. This artwork depicts a reality in which these animals share the wait with us and commiserate with the desire to move time forward despite the unmoving clock hands.

== Notable places nearby ==
- St. Vincent Greenway
