= Pagedale, Missouri =

- City
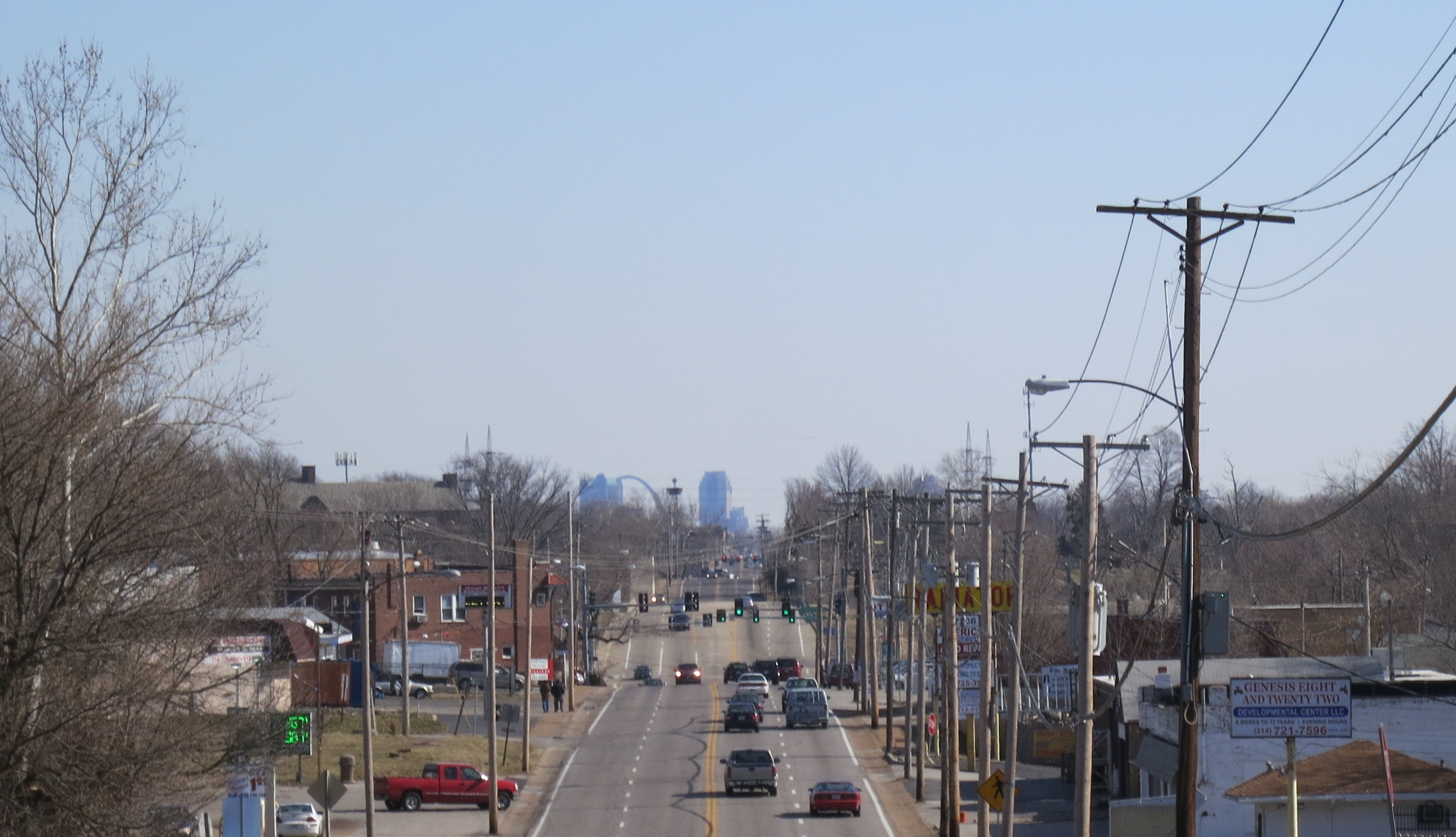
- St. Charles Rock Road, Pagedale, Missouri, February 2013

- Location within St. Louis County and Missouri
- Coordinates: 38°40′49″N 90°18′29″W
- Country: United States
- State: Missouri
- County: St. Louis
- Established: February 15, 1950

Area
  - Total: 1.20 sq mi (3.12 km^{2})
  - Land: 1.20 sq mi (3.12 km^{2})
  - Water: 0 sq mi (0.00 km^{2})
- Elevation: 581 ft (177 m)

Population (2020)
  - Total: 2,554
  - Density: 2,121.9/sq mi (819.26/km^{2})
- Time zone: UTC-6 (Central (CST))
  - Summer (DST): UTC-5 (CDT)
- Area code: 314
- FIPS code: 29-55964
- GNIS feature ID: 2396126
- Website: https://www.cityofpagedalemo.gov/

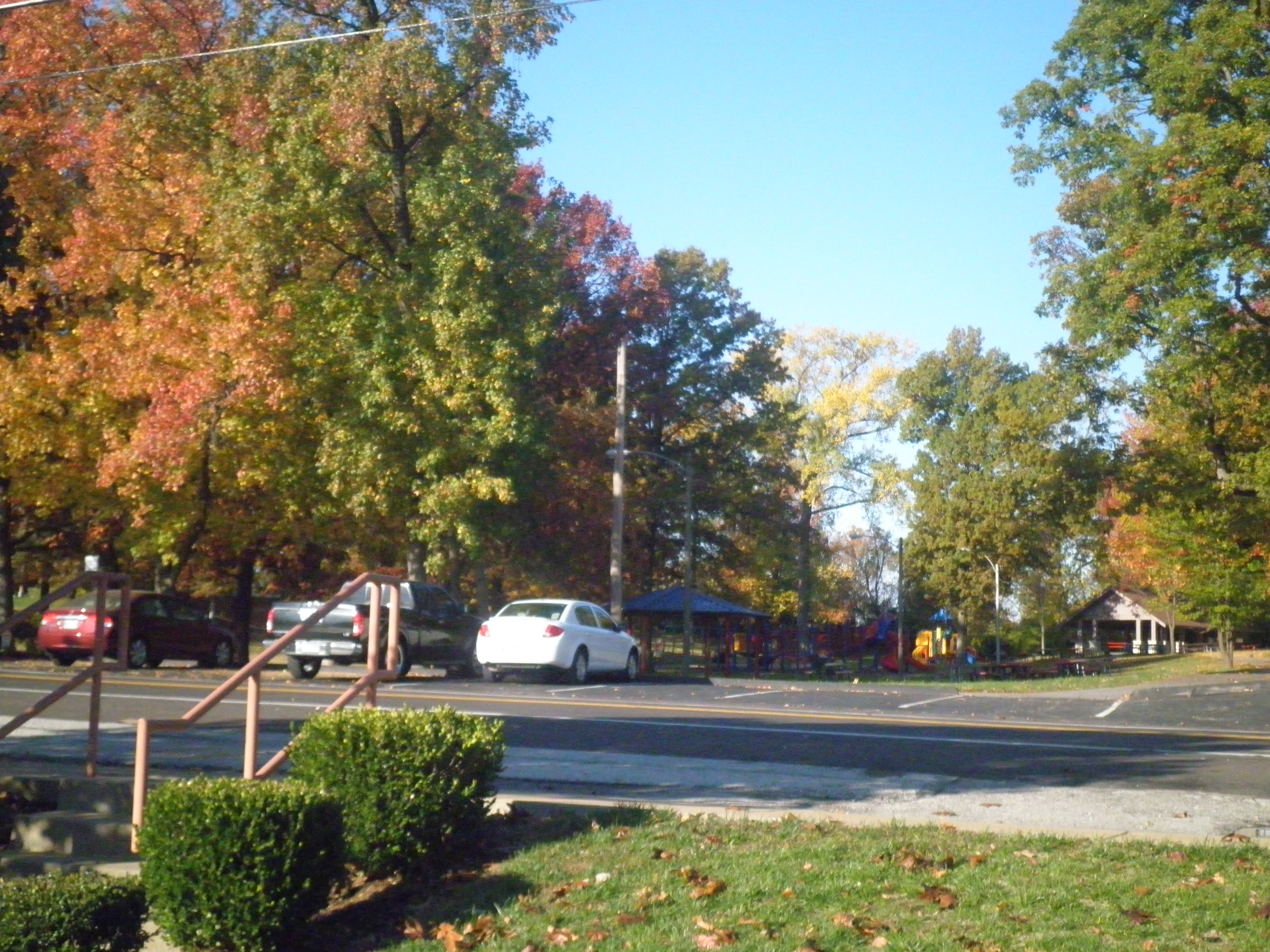
Baerveldt Park

Pagedale is a city in St. Louis County, Missouri, United States. The population was 2,554 as of the 2020 census.

== History ==
The area originally was farmland, but it did have an interesting history with several pockets of significant Greek and African-American residents. Because St. Vincent's mental hospital was located just north of St. Charles Rock Road, a streetcar line was constructed in the late 1800s from just south of Olive Street Road in University City north on the east side of Ferguson Avenue through what is now Pagedale to meet the electric interurban line to Saint Charles at the Rock Road. The south end of the line eventually joined with the Creve Coeur Lake streetcar line which ran on Vernon Avenue (but later was relocated a block further south to run behind a new subdivision). That transportation opened up the area to housing.

South of Pagedale, at Page and Ferguson, was Hazel Hill, which eventually became the reason for the Lincoln School which became part of the Normandy School District. Though long forgotten as a name, the Hazel Hill community still exists and the Lincoln building is still standing. When Pagedale was incorporated, the northern end went beyond the Rock Road up Hoke Avenue, which later was renamed Ferguson though it didn't line up with Ferguson. In 1954 a new housing subdivision was built at Ferguson and North Market Street. That subdivision, named Engelholm Gardens, a long forgotten name also, still stands, looking exactly as it did in 1954.

In 2001, a new $1 million Pagedale City Hall and Police Facility was built. It included an 8,000-square-foot space to house a local court facility.

In November 2015, some residents filed a civil rights class action lawsuit against the city of Pagedale for overly aggressive ticketing of residential code enforcement as a "revenue generating machine".

== Geography ==
According to the United States Census Bureau, the city has a total area of 1.19 square miles (3.08 km^{2}), all land.

== Demographics ==
Historical population
Census	Pop.	Note	%±
1950	3,866		—
1960	5,106		32.1%
1970	5,044		−1.2%
1980	4,590		−9.0%
1990	3,771		−17.8%
2000	3,616		−4.1%
2010	3,310		−8.5%
2020	2,554		−22.8%
U.S. Decennial Census

=== Racial and ethnic composition ===
Pagedale, Missouri – Racial and ethnic composition Note: the US Census treats Hispanic/Latino as an ethnic category. This table excludes Latinos from the racial categories and assigns them to a separate category. Hispanics/Latinos may be of any race.
Race / Ethnicity (NH = Non-Hispanic)	Pop 2000	Pop 2010	Pop 2020	% 2000	% 2010	% 2020
White alone (NH)	194	104	78	5.37%	3.15%	3.05%
Black or African American alone (NH)	3,319	3,072	2,324	91.79%	92.98%	90.99%
Native American or Alaska Native alone (NH)	6	8	1	0.17%	0.24%	0.04%
Asian alone (NH)	8	5	3	0.22%	0.15%	0.12%
Native Hawaiian or Pacific Islander alone (NH)	0	0	0	0.00%	0.00%	0.00%
Other race alone (NH)	4	2	5	0.11%	0.06%	0.20%
Mixed race or Multiracial (NH)	49	68	68	1.36%	2.06%	2.66%
Hispanic or Latino (any race)	36	45	75	1.00%	1.36%	2.94%
Total	3,616	3,304	2,554	100.00%	100.00%	100.00%

=== 2020 census ===
As of the 2020 census, Pagedale had a population of 2,554. The median age was 39.8 years. 24.6% of residents were under the age of 18 and 17.9% of residents were 65 years of age or older. For every 100 females, there were 81.7 males, and for every 100 females age 18 and over, there were 74.6 males age 18 and over.

100.0% of residents lived in urban areas, while 0.0% lived in rural areas.

There were 1,076 households in Pagedale, of which 30.1% had children under the age of 18 living in them. Of all households, 16.4% were married-couple households, 21.8% were households with a male householder and no spouse or partner present, and 55.7% were households with a female householder and no spouse or partner present. About 34.7% of all households were made up of individuals and 15.4% had someone living alone who was 65 years of age or older.

There were 1,384 housing units, of which 22.3% were vacant. The homeowner vacancy rate was 2.9% and the rental vacancy rate was 15.2%.

=== 2010 census ===
As of the census of 2010, there were 3,304 people, 1,179 households, and 829 families living in the city. The population density was 2,776.5 inhabitants per square mile (1,072.0/km^{2}). There were 1,461 housing units at an average density of 1,227.7 per square mile (474.0/km^{2}). The racial makeup of the city was 3.4% White, 93.4% African American, 0.2% Native American, 0.2% Asian, 0.6% from other races, and 2.2% from two or more races. Hispanic or Latino of any race were 1.4% of the population.

There were 1,179 households, of which 39.0% had children under the age of 18 living with them, 22.5% were married couples living together, 39.9% had a female householder with no husband present, 7.9% had a male householder with no wife present, and 29.7% were non-families. 25.4% of all households were made up of individuals, and 10.5% had someone living alone who was 65 years of age or older. The average household size was 2.79 and the average family size was 3.33.

The median age in the city was 32.7 years. 30.6% of residents were under the age of 18; 9.9% were between the ages of 18 and 24; 24.3% were from 25 to 44; 23.4% were from 45 to 64; and 11.7% were 65 years of age or older. The gender makeup of the city was 46.1% male and 53.9% female.

=== 2000 census ===
As of the census of 2000, there were 3,616 people, 1,213 households, and 891 families living in the city. The population density was 3,003.8 inhabitants per square mile (1,159.8/km^{2}). There were 1,408 housing units at an average density of 1,169.6 per square mile (451.6/km^{2}). The racial makeup of the city was 5.67% White, 92.09% African American, 0.30% Native American, 0.22% Asian, 0.28% from other races, and 1.44% from two or more races. Hispanic or Latino of any race were 1.00% of the population.

There were 1,213 households, out of which 33.7% had children under the age of 18 living with them, 28.4% were married couples living together, 39.0% had a female householder with no husband present, and 26.5% were non-families. 22.3% of all households were made up of individuals, and 7.3% had someone living alone who was 65 years of age or older. The average household size was 2.89 and the average family size was 3.40.

In the city, the population was spread out, with 31.2% under the age of 18, 9.6% from 18 to 24, 24.3% from 25 to 44, 22.7% from 45 to 64, and 12.1% who were 65 years of age or older. The median age was 34 years. For every 100 females, there were 83.3 males. For every 100 females age 18 and over, there were 76.6 males.

The median income for a household in the city was $23,873, and the median income for a family was $25,917. Males had a median income of $31,875 versus $24,423 for females. The per capita income for the city was $11,005. About 25.7% of families and 29.5% of the population were below the poverty line, including 38.5% of those under age 18 and 29.6% of those age 65 or over.

== Municipal Fines and City Settlement ==
In response to excessive municipal fines, Missouri passed legislation limiting St. Louis county cities to obtain a maximum of 12.5% of their total budget from traffic fines. The city saw an increase of 495% in non traffic cases, writing a total of 2,255 non-traffic citations in 2014.

The St. Louis Post-Dispatch ran a series of articles covering St. Louis County and Pagedale and the substantial increase in city revenue from non-traffic violations. According to the 2015 city code in Pagedale, the residents were not allowed to have "a basketball hoop, volleyball net, swimming or wading pool or other recreational equipment shall be utilized on or permitted on any portion of residential property in front of the front line of any dwelling". Other infractions of the code include having hedges over three feet in the front yard, having any antenna dish device in the front of the yard, any front street facing window or doors shall have proper treatments in a neat presentable matter, and if a person in the city has their pants low enough to show his skin or underwear, the person can receive a fine up to $100.

On November 4, 2015 Institute for Justice filed a class action civil rights complaint against the city on behalf of three Pagedale residents. The complaint claimed residents of Pagedale were stripped of their rights to due process. It also sought an injunction against the city non-traffic fines.

On May 18, 2018, the city settled and agreed to stop its practice of earning money from ticketing residents for minor crimes.

== Education ==
It is in the Normandy Schools Collaborative school district. The comprehensive high school of the district is Normandy High School.

Lincoln Elementary School was in Pagedale. Lucas Crossing Elementary School, scheduled to open in 2001, took students formerly at Lincoln Elementary.
