= East-West Gateway Council of Governments =

The East-West Gateway Council of Governments (EWGCOG or EWG) is the official Council of Governments and Metropolitan planning organization for Greater St. Louis, USA. It was incorporated in 1965.

== Purpose ==
The council coordinates planning and problem solving in areas of governmental responsibility for transportation planning that impact more than one jurisdiction in the Greater St Louis area. The organization serves St. Louis City. Franklin County, Jefferson County, St. Charles County, and St. Louis County in Missouri, plus Madison County, Monroe County, and St. Clair County in Illinois. It included highway expansion and planning public transportation.

== Governance ==
The council is headed by a board of directors as official governance, with associate members from throughout the region.
