= Lambert Airport Terminal 1 station =

Light rail station in St. Louis County, Missouri, US

Lambert Airport - Terminal 1
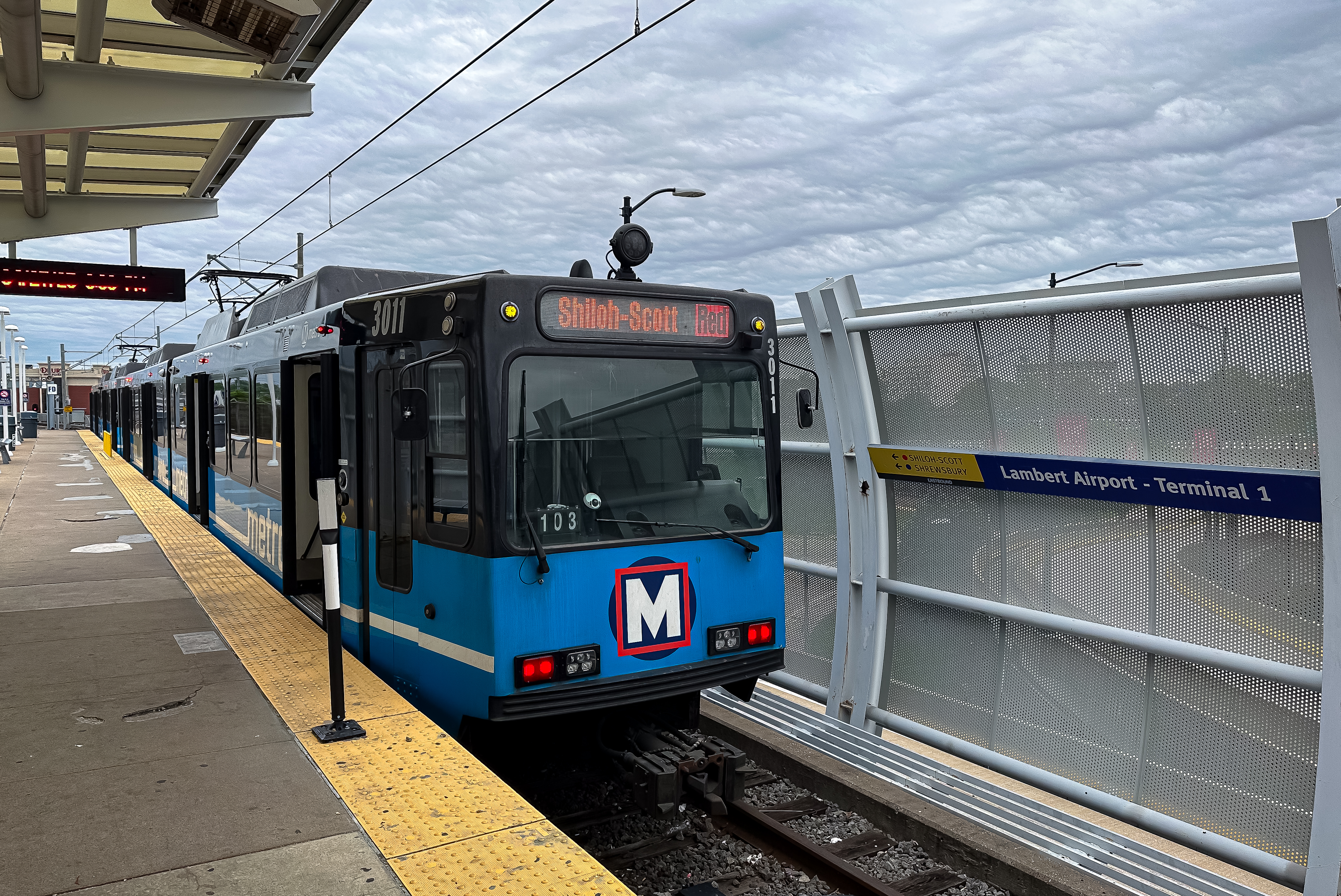
- A Red Line train awaiting departure at Terminal 1

General information
- Location: 10701 Lambert International Boulevard; Edmundson, Missouri
- Coordinates: 38.741182°N 90.364838°W
- Owner: Bi-State Development
- Operator: Metro Transit
- Platforms: 1 island platform
- Tracks: 2

Construction
- Structure type: Elevated
- Accessible: Yes

History
- Opened: June 25, 1994
- Former names: Lambert Airport Main

Passengers
- 2018: 1,060 daily
- Rank: 16 out of 38

Services
Preceding station	MetroLink	Following station
Terminus	Red Line	Lambert Airport Terminal 2 toward Shiloh–Scott
Location

Lambert Airport Terminal 1 station is a light rail station on the Red Line of the St. Louis MetroLink system. This elevated station is connected to the eastern end of Terminal 1, near D Concourse, at St. Louis Lambert International Airport.

== Station layout ==
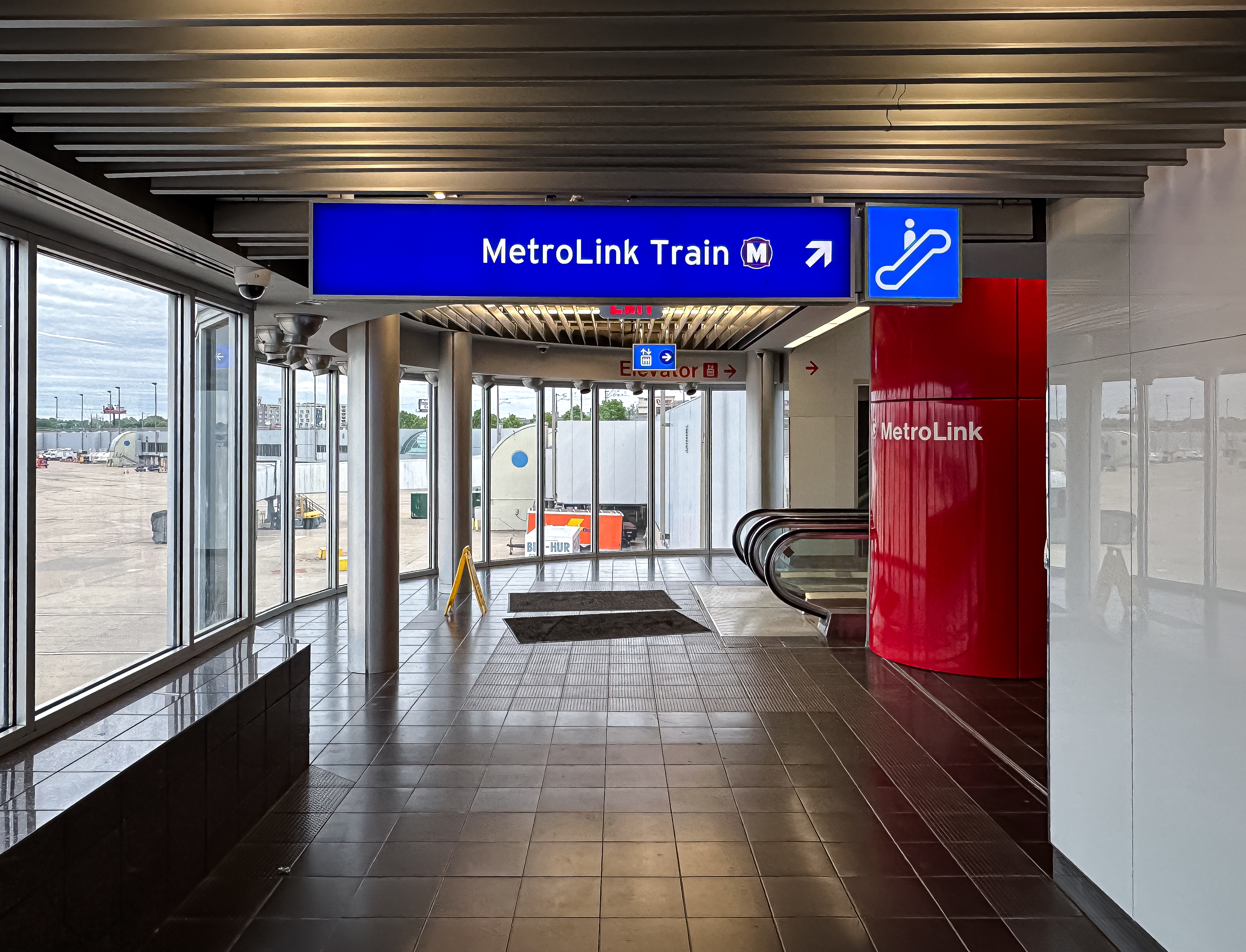
Terminal 1 MetroLink access corridor

The station is accessed via a corridor on the ticketing level of Terminal 1, near Entry 2. An escalator or an elevator then takes passengers up to the platform level.

== Public artwork ==
In 2014, Metro's Arts in Transit program commissioned the work Nucleic Life Formation by Amy Cheng for this station. This piece consists of two abstract mural designs, one over the station's escalators, the other adjacent to the platform entrance. Both designs are suggestive of striated nightscapes crossed by a constellation of “stars” that loosely mimics a DNA double helix.
