= College station (MetroLink) =

Light rail station in St. Clair County, Illinois, US

College

General information
- Location: 2622 Carlyle Avenue; Belleville, Illinois
- Coordinates: 38.516248°N 89.919416°W
- Owner: Bi-State Development
- Operator: Metro Transit
- Platforms: 1 island platform
- Tracks: 2
- Bus stands: 4
- Connections: MetroBus Illinois: 16

Construction
- Structure type: At-grade
- Parking: 623 spaces
- Cycle facilities: Racks, MetroBikeLink Trail
- Accessible: Yes

History
- Opened: May 5, 2001

Passengers
- 2018: 509 daily
- Rank: 30 out of 38

Services
Preceding station	MetroLink	Following station
Belleville toward Lambert Airport Terminal 1	Red Line	Shiloh–Scott Terminus
Location

College station is a light rail station on the Red Line of the St. Louis MetroLink system. The at-grade station serves Southwestern Illinois College on the eastern edge of Belleville, Illinois. It also features MetroBus service and 623 park and ride spaces.

== History ==
College has a connection to the St. Clair County Transit District's 14-mile (23 km) MetroBikeLink shared-use path system. This was the first segment of the MetroBikeLink system when it opened in 2002 and consisted of a 4-mile (6.4 km) trail, running from the Swansea station to Southwestern Illinois College. Here, trail users can connect with pathways on the college campus and the East Belleville YMCA Loop Trail just north of Illinois Route 161.

== Station layout ==
The island platform is accessed via a single ramp on its north end that connects to the bus boarding area and the park and ride lot.

== Notable places nearby ==
- Southwestern Illinois College
