= Belleville station (MetroLink) =

Light rail station in St. Clair County, Illinois, US

Belleville
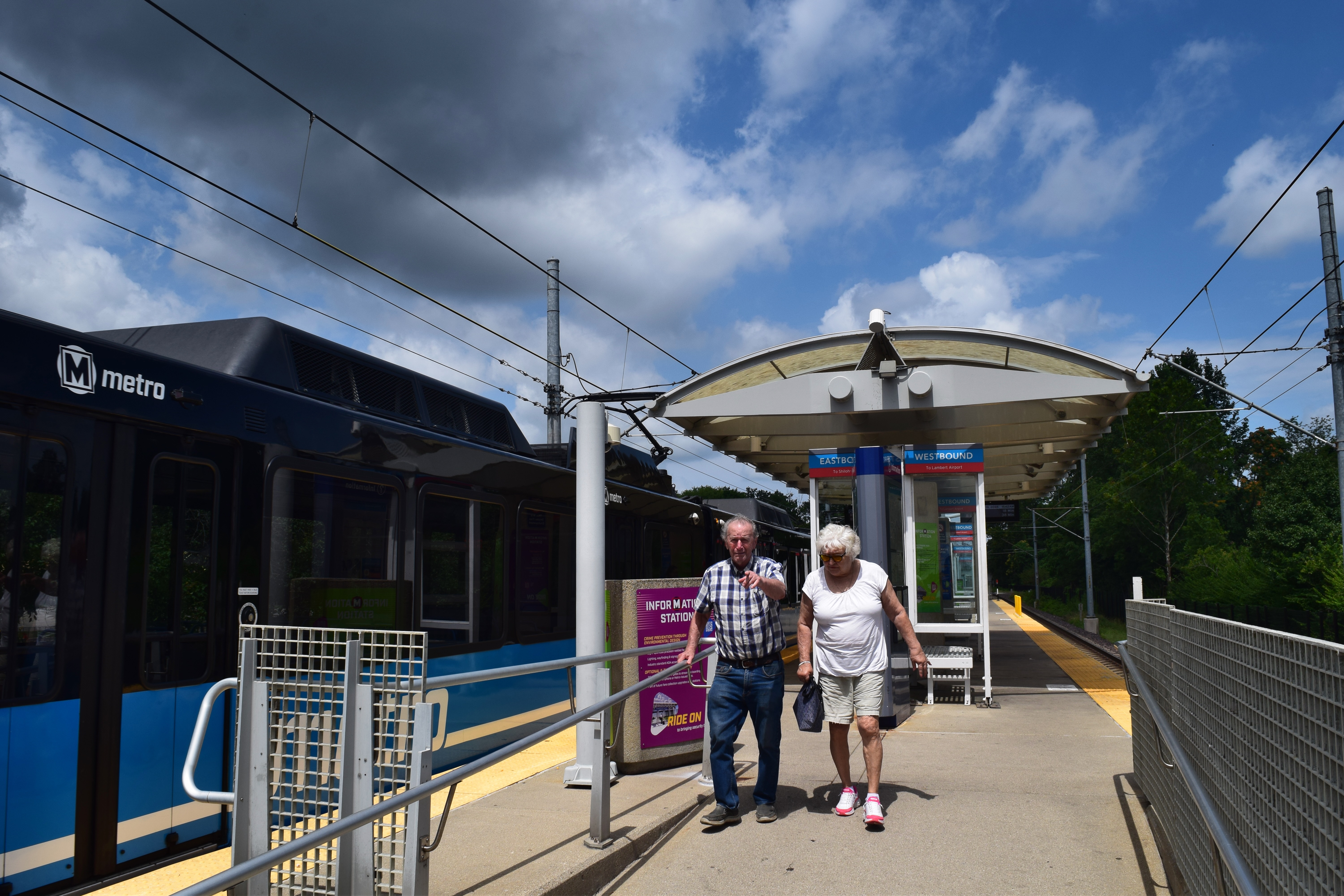
- An eastbound Red Line train at Belleville

General information
- Location: 800 Scheel Street; Belleville, Illinois
- Coordinates: 38.52180°N 89.97432°W
- Owner: Bi-State Development
- Operator: Metro Transit
- Platforms: 1 island platform
- Tracks: 2
- Bus stands: 5
- Connections: MetroBus Illinois: 01, 15, 16, 23

Construction
- Structure type: At-grade
- Parking: 321 spaces
- Cycle facilities: Racks, MetroBikeLink Trail
- Accessible: Yes

History
- Opened: May 5, 2001

Passengers
- 2018: 534 daily
- Rank: 28 out of 38

Services
Preceding station	MetroLink	Following station
Swansea toward Lambert Airport Terminal 1	Red Line	College toward Shiloh–Scott
Location

Belleville station is a light rail station on the Red Line of the St. Louis MetroLink system. This at-grade station bisects Scheel Street in the northern section of Belleville, Illinois approximately one-mile (1.6 km) from the center of town. It features a MetroBus transfer and 321 park and ride spaces.

This station also includes a small retail building with four storefronts near the bus boarding plaza.

== History ==
Belleville has a connection to the St. Clair County Transit District's 14-mile (23 km) MetroBikeLink shared-use path system. This was the first segment of the MetroBikeLink system when it opened in 2002 and consisted of a 4-mile (6.4 km) trail, running from the Swansea station to Southwestern Illinois College. Just south of this station, trail users can connect to the Orchard Loop Connector and to the north, the Richland Creek Greenway.

In 2022, the area between the bus bays and MetroLink entrance was updated into a space with a vibrant-colored “Art Grows in Belleville” theme and includes new custom bike racks, shade structures, a Belleville city logo sign, benches, planters and elevated window artwork. The third "Transit Stop Transformation" project to be completed, it was unveiled on June 26, 2022, by Citizens for Modern Transit, AARP in St. Louis, and Metro Transit in partnership with several local agencies.

== Station layout ==
The island platform is accessed via a single ramp on its east end that connects to the bus boarding area on the south side of the tracks and Scheel Street on the north side.

== Bus connections ==
The following MetroBus lines serve Belleville station:

- 01 Main Street-State Street
- 15 Belleville-O'Fallon
- 16 St. Clair Square
- 23 Belleville-College

== Notable places nearby ==
- Downtown Belleville
