= MidAmerica St. Louis Airport station =

Future light rail station in Illinois, US

MidAmerica St. Louis Airport

General information
- Location: 9660 Airport Boulevard; Mascoutah, Illinois
- Coordinates: 38°32′56″N 89°48′47″W
- Owner: St. Clair County Transit District
- Operator: Metro Transit
- Platforms: 1 island platform
- Tracks: 2

Construction
- Structure type: At-grade
- Parking: Paid parking nearby
- Cycle facilities: MetroBikeLink Trail
- Accessible: Yes

History
- Opening: November 30, 2026

Services
Preceding station	MetroLink	Following station
Shiloh–Scott toward Lambert Airport Terminal 1	Red Line	Terminus
Location

MidAmerica St. Louis Airport station is an under construction St. Louis MetroLink station in Mascoutah, Illinois, adjacent to MidAmerica St. Louis Airport, after which the station is named. When opened, this station will be the eastern terminus of the MetroLink system. It is scheduled to open on November 30, 2026 as part of a 5.2-mile (8.4 km) expansion of the Red Line from Shiloh–Scott station.

== History ==
Plans to extend the MetroLink line to MidAmerica St. Louis Airport received $96 million in funding from the State of Illinois in 2019. The 5.2-mile (8.4 km) extension includes 2.6 miles (4.2 km) of double track, a 2.6-mile (4.2 km) single-track section, and a passenger station at MidAmerica Airport.

Design work was completed in summer 2022, and a request for proposals was issued that November. Construction was expected to begin in summer 2023 with completion targeted for spring 2025. As of March 2025, the station is expected to open in mid-2026.
