= Memorial Hospital station =

Light rail station in St. Clair County, Illinois, US

Memorial Hospital

General information
- Location: 1460 Frank Scott Parkway; Belleville, Illinois
- Coordinates: 38.557600°N 90.015728°W
- Owner: Bi-State Development
- Operator: Metro Transit
- Platforms: 1 island platform
- Tracks: 2
- Bus stands: 3
- Connections: MetroBus Illinois: 14

Construction
- Structure type: Below-grade
- Parking: 431 spaces
- Cycle facilities: Racks, MetroBikeLink Trail
- Accessible: Yes

History
- Opened: May 5, 2001

Passengers
- 2018: 304 daily
- Rank: 37 out of 38

Services
Preceding station	MetroLink	Following station
Fairview Heights toward Lambert Airport Terminal 1	Red Line	Swansea toward Shiloh–Scott
Location

Memorial Hospital station is a light rail station on the Red Line of the St. Louis MetroLink system. This below-grade station is located beneath an overpass on Frank Scott Parkway in Belleville, Illinois and has 431 park and ride spaces across three parking lots.

Memorial Hospital has a connection to the St. Clair County Transit District's 14-mile (23 km) MetroBikeLink shared-use path system.

== Station layout ==
The island platform is accessed via a single ramp that connects to the MetroBikeLink trail and ramps to Frank Scott Parkway.

== Notable places nearby ==
- Memorial Hospital Belleville
