= List of Metro Transit (St. Louis) yards and depots =

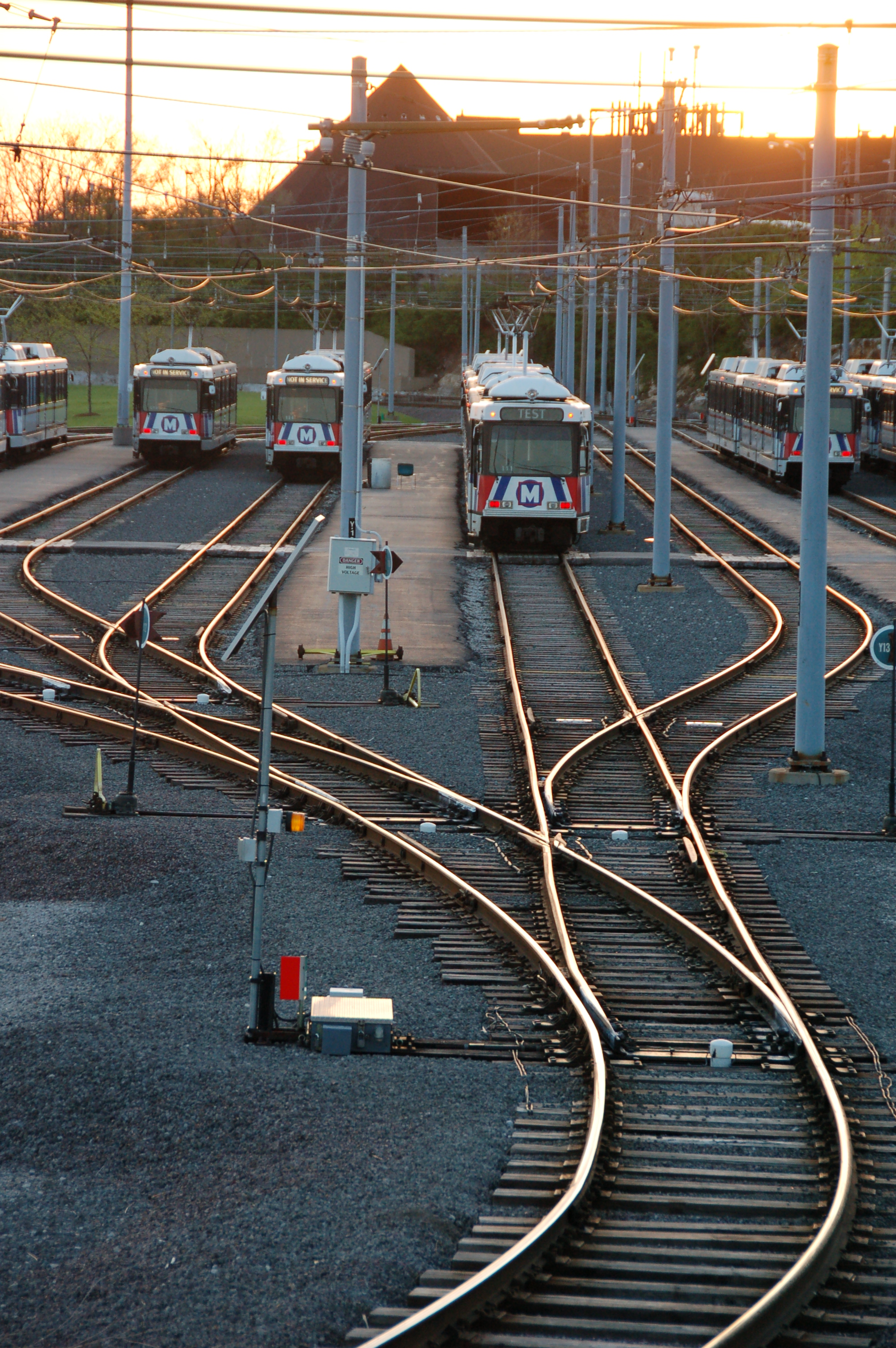
Ewing Yard with some SD-400 and SD-460 cars

Metro Transit, the public transit operator in the Greater St. Louis area, operates two rail yards for the MetroLink light rail system, four bus depots for MetroBus and Metro Call-A-Ride services, and one streetcar barn for the Loop Trolley.

== Rail ==
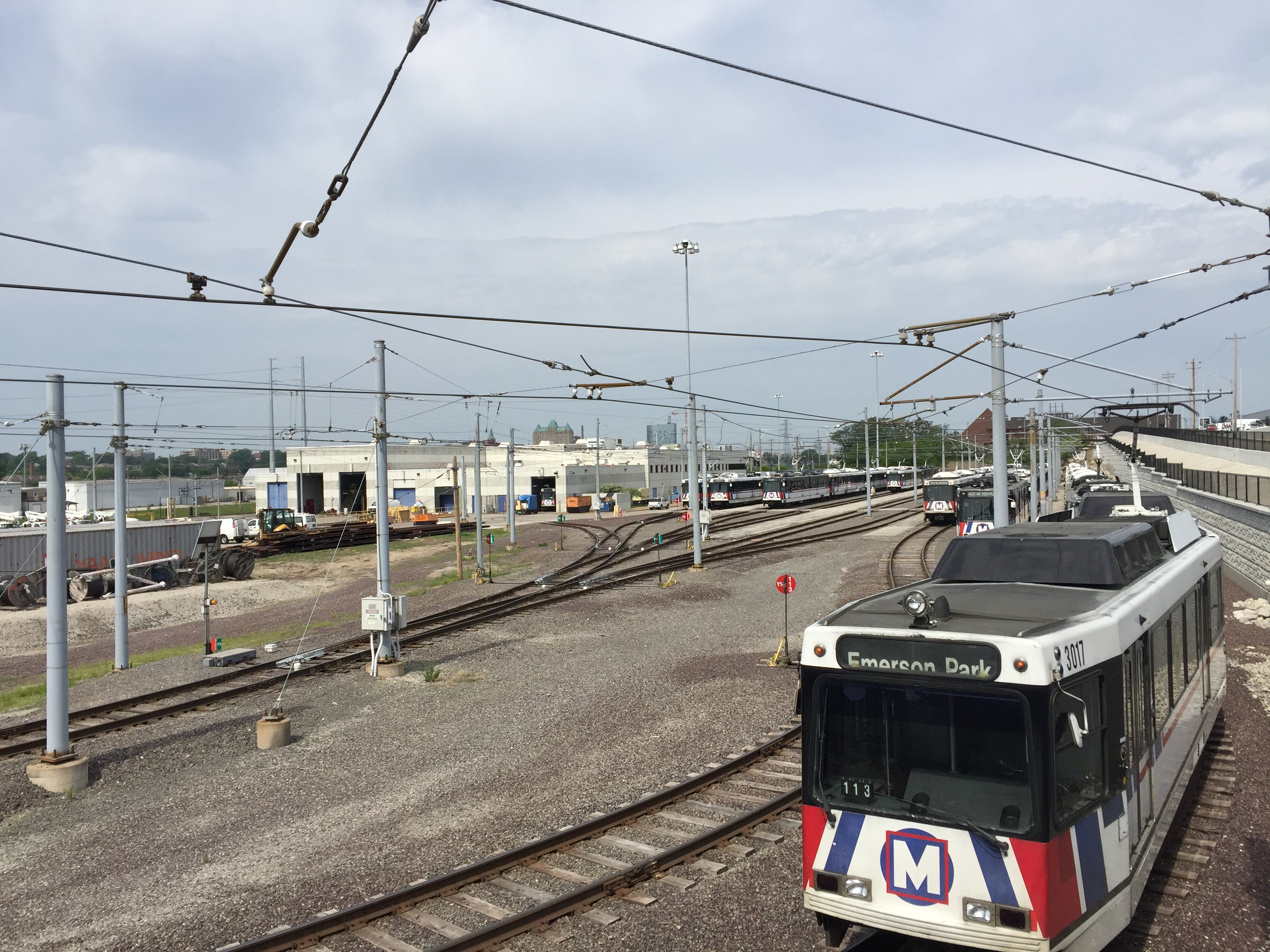
Ewing Yard seen from Jefferson Avenue

Metro operates two rail yards and shops that maintain its SD-400 and SD-460 light rail vehicles, a storage yard, and one streetcar barn for the Loop Trolley:

=== Ewing Yard and Shops ===
The Ewing Yard and Shops are located near downtown St. Louis. The complex is bounded by Jefferson Avenue to the east, Scott Avenue to the north, Ewing Avenue to the west, and Terminal Railroad right-of-way to the south. This facility opened with the initial alignment in 1993 and was built on a former railroad storage and maintenance facility that served Union Station until it closed in 1978.

The yard covers 12-acres that can accommodate 50 light rail vehicles and includes a 71,000 square foot main shop building. Other facilities include a car wash bay, a running repair track, a truck shop, a break and coupler shop, an HVAC shop, and a pantograph shop. In addition, Ewing houses MetroLink's Operational Control Center (OCC), bus communications, and public safety dispatch.

=== 29th Street Yard and Shops ===
The 29th Street Yard and Shops are located in East St. Louis, Illinois and opened in 2001 with the St. Clair County MetroLink extension. The complex sits on reclaimed industrial property along abandoned right-of-way from the St. Louis and O'Fallon Railway.

The yard covers 15-acres that can accommodate 48 light rail vehicles and includes a 51,800 square foot main shop building. This facility has similar repair shops to Ewing and also includes a two track light rail vehicle painting facility that Metro opened in 2009 at a cost of $1.1 million.

=== Sarah Yard ===
Opened in 2002, Sarah is a 2,000 square foot storage yard near the Cortex MetroLink station. It is primarily used to store spare right-of-way components for MetroLink and was used as a staging area for construction of the Cortex station. Prior to construction of the Cortex station the site featured a historic Wabash Railroad signal tower. The tower was demolished in 2017 to allow the MetroLink alignment to shift slightly north for the new station.

=== Loop Trolley Barn ===
The Loop Trolley maintains its two streetcars at 5875 Delmar Boulevard, in a building that had been Delmar High School until 1980.

== Bus ==
Metro Transit operates three garages for MetroBus:

=== Brentwood Garage ===
The Brentwood garage opened in 1983 and is located in central St. Louis County. The 281,066 square foot facility includes infrastructure to charge and maintain Metro's electric bus fleet.

=== DeBaliviere Garage ===
The DeBaliviere garage is a 351,993 square foot facility that opened in 1986 and also includes infrastructure for electric buses. Prior to the Bi-State Development agency suspending streetcar service in 1966, the location of today's DeBaliviere Garage was an outdoor streetcar yard.

=== Illinois Garage ===
The Illinois garage opened in 1984 and is roughly 1.4 miles (2.3 km) from the 29th Street rail yard in East St. Louis. The 287,255 square foot facility serves buses that run on routes sponsored by the St. Clair County Transit District.

== Maintenance ==
=== Central ===
Central opened in 1983 in Midtown St. Louis and has 321,000 square feet of space. Metro conducts heavy repairs across various fleets at this facility including: engine, transmission, and body repairs. It is also the primary shop for Metro's Call-A-Ride service and non-revenue vehicles. In 2022, Metro opened its real-time camera center at this facility as part of the Secure Platform Plan.

Central sits on the former site of Red Stocking Baseball Park.

=== Swansea ===
Swansea is a 16,690 square foot facility in a former strip mall. It is located at the Swansea MetroLink station and provides workspace and storage for the agency's Metro East crews.

== See also ==
- List of MetroLink (St. Louis) stations
