= Swansea station (MetroLink) =

Light rail station in St. Clair County, Illinois, US

Swansea
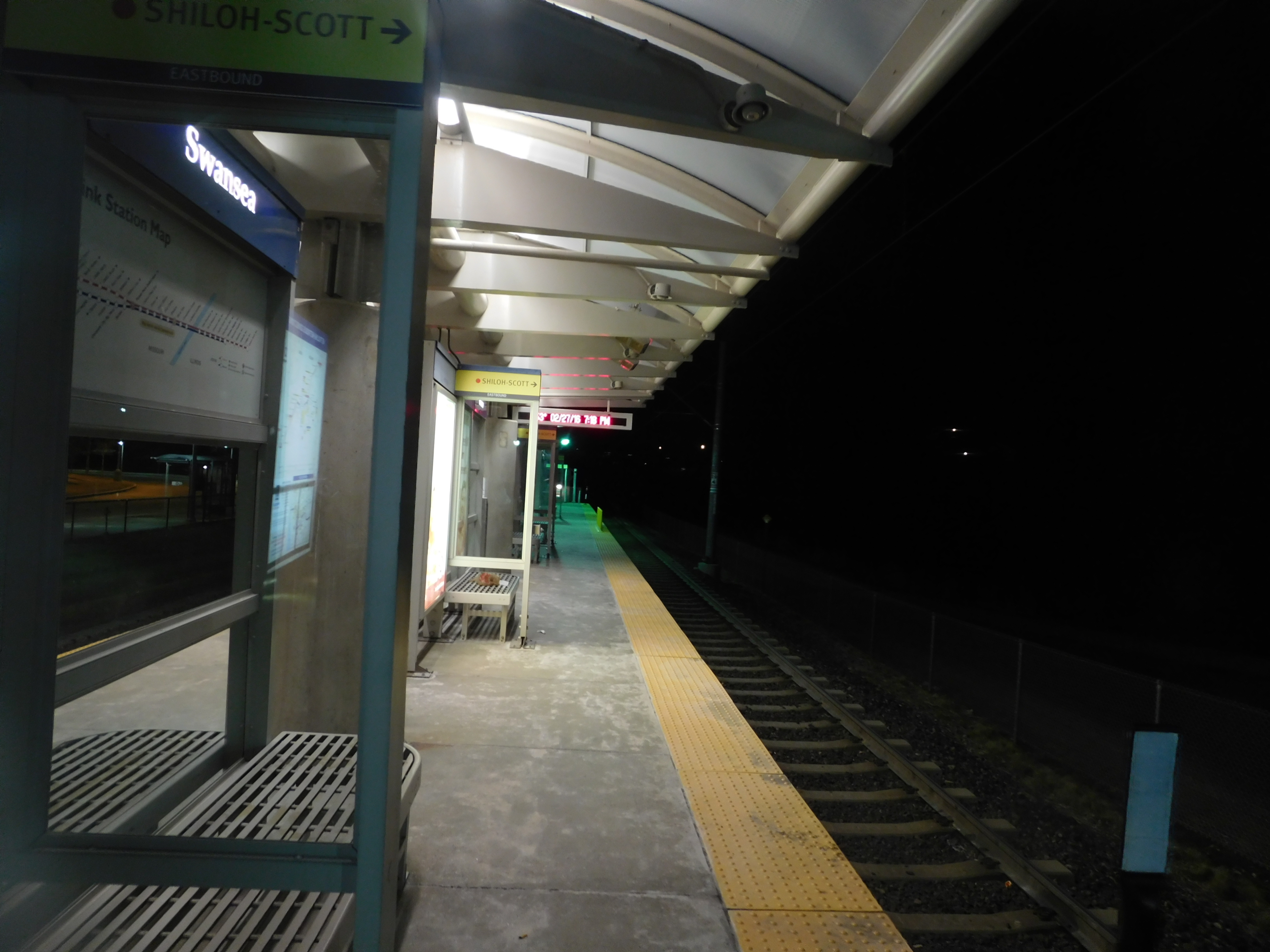
- Swansea station platform

General information
- Location: 236 Metro Way; Swansea, Illinois
- Coordinates: 38.536023°N 89.986916°W
- Owner: Bi-State Development
- Operator: Metro Transit
- Platforms: 1 island platform
- Tracks: 2
- Bus stands: 6
- Connections: MetroBus Illinois: 16

Construction
- Structure type: At-grade
- Parking: 751 spaces
- Cycle facilities: Racks, MetroBikeLink Trail
- Accessible: Yes

History
- Opened: May 5, 2001

Passengers
- 2018: 370 daily
- Rank: 35 out of 38

Services
Preceding station	MetroLink	Following station
Memorial Hospital toward Lambert Airport Terminal 1	Red Line	Belleville toward Shiloh–Scott
Location

Swansea station is a light rail station on the Red Line of the St. Louis MetroLink system. This at-grade station is located in Swansea, Illinois between Illinois State Routes 159 and 161. It is primarily a commuter station with 751 park and ride spaces and MetroBus service.

Also located at this station is a 16,690 square foot maintenance facility that provides workspace and storage for Metro's Illinois crews.

== History ==
Swansea has a connection to the St. Clair County Transit District's 14-mile (23 km) MetroBikeLink shared-use path system. This was the first segment of the MetroBikeLink system when it opened in 2002 and consisted of a 4-mile (6.4 km) trail, running from the Swansea station to Southwestern Illinois College. Just south of this station, trail users can connect to the Richland Creek Greenway in Belleville, Illinois.

In 2019, an $11 million transit-oriented development called Metro Landing of Swansea opened on a vacant lot next to the park and ride lot and caters to adults seeking an independent lifestyle at an affordable cost.

== Station layout ==
The island platform is accessed via a single ramp on its west end that connects to the bus boarding area on the north side of the tracks and the MetroBikeLink trail on the south side.
