= MidAmerica St. Louis Airport =

Airport serving St. Louis, Missouri

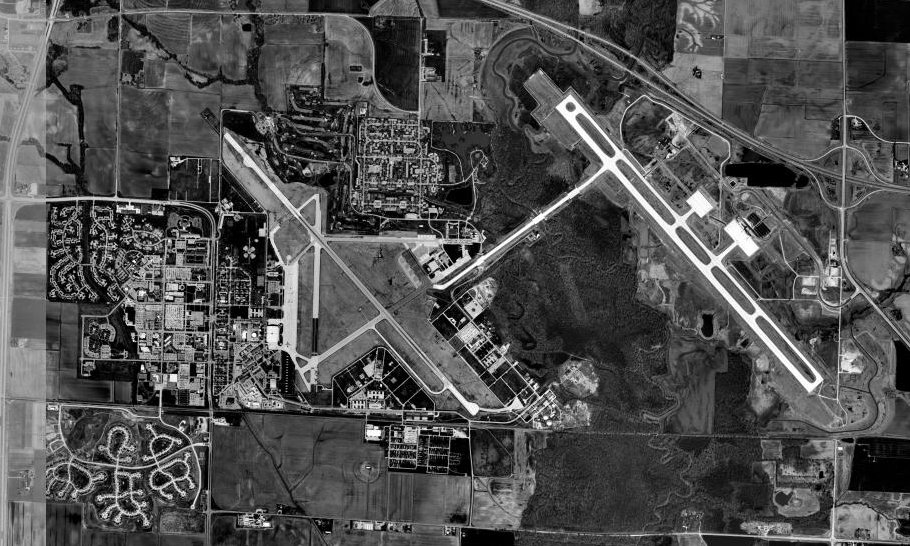
- USGS 1998 orthophoto
- IATA: BLV; ICAO: KBLV; FAA LID: BLV

Summary
- Airport type: Public / Military
- Owner/Operator: St. Clair County, United States Air Force
- Serves: Greater St. Louis
- Location: Belleville, Illinois
- Opened: 1997; 29 years ago
- Time zone: CST (UTC−06:00)
  - Summer (DST): CDT (UTC−05:00)
- Elevation AMSL: 459 ft (140 m)
- Coordinates: 38°32′43″N 089°50′07″W
- Website: flymidamerica.com

Maps
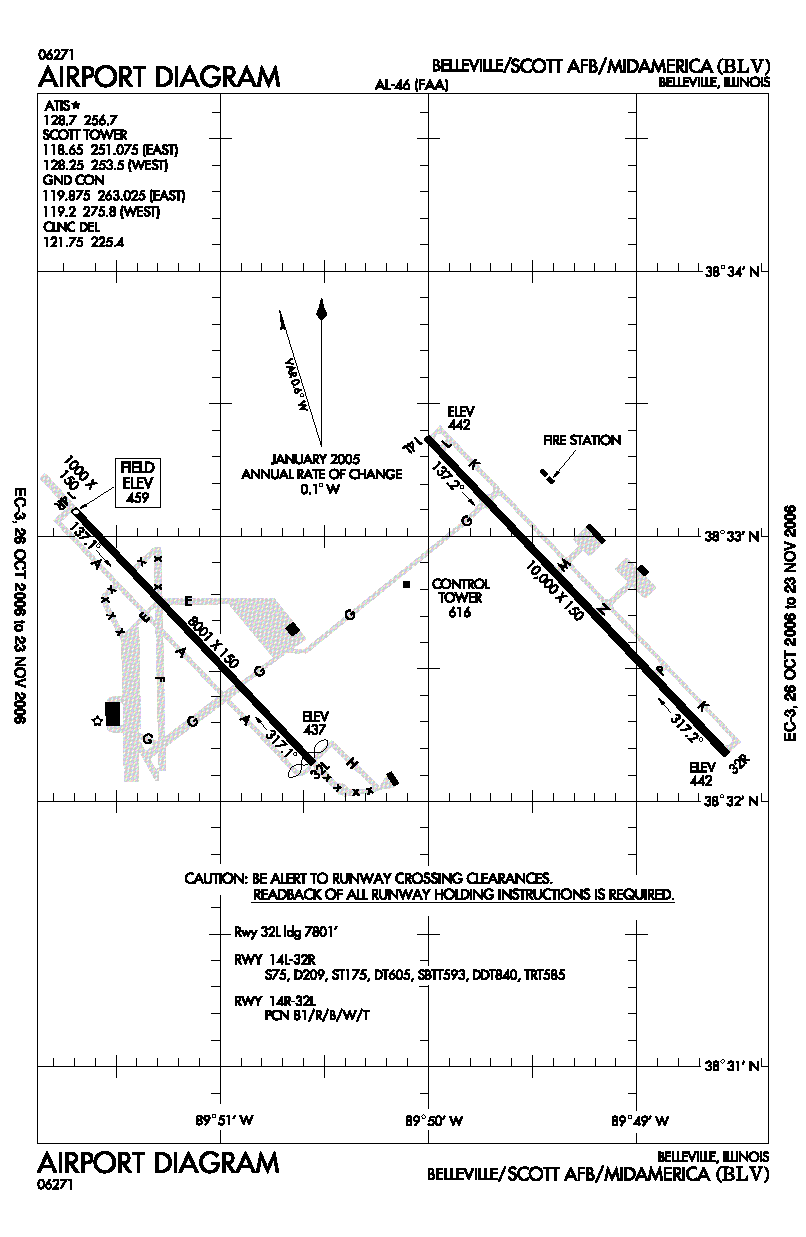
- FAA airport diagram
- Interactive map of MidAmerica St. Louis Airport

Runways
Direction	Length		Surface
Direction	ft	m	Surface
14L/32R	10,000	3,048	Concrete
14R/32L	8,006	2,440	Asphalt/concrete

Statistics (2020)
- Aircraft operations: 25,612
- Based aircraft: 27
- Passengers: 245,028
- Source: Federal Aviation Administration

MidAmerica St. Louis Airport (IATA: BLV, ICAO: KBLV, FAA LID: BLV) is a joint-use airport located next to and connected with Scott Air Force Base. It is located 18 nautical miles [nmi] (33 km; 21 mi) east of downtown St. Louis and 14 nmi (26 km; 16 mi) east of the central business district of Belleville in St. Clair County, Illinois, United States. Opened in 1997, MidAmerica is the secondary domestic passenger airport for the Greater St. Louis metropolitan area, after the larger St. Louis Lambert International Airport. It is currently served by one scheduled commercial airline, Allegiant Air.

The airport had 152,278 passenger enplanements in 2018 (302,000 total passengers), according to the Federal Aviation Administration. It was included in the National Plan of Integrated Airport Systems for 2017–21, which categorized it as a primary commercial service airport because it surpassed 10,000 annual enplanements. It is the fifth-busiest of the 12 commercial airports In Illinois.

== History ==
MidAmerica St. Louis Airport was created to alleviate crowding at St. Louis Lambert International Airport, but had been criticized as a pork barrel project. Featured several times on a "Fleecing of America" segment on the NBC Nightly News, it was called a "Gateway to Nowhere" by Tom Brokaw, costing taxpayers $313 million. Congestion at Lambert Airport has not been a problem since American Airlines ended hub operations at the airport and a new billion-dollar runway opened in 2006.

As of 2021, nearly $125 million of St. Clair County taxpayer funds have been spent covering the airport's deficits. The airport's biggest revenue source is fuel sales to Boeing, which test-flies drones for the U.S. Navy. The airport will be paying its construction debt from 1995 until 2045, costing taxpayers an additional $88 million.

Supporters credit MidAmerica's additional runway with saving Scott AFB from closure during the 2005 Base Realignment and Closure process. They also describe MidAmerica as a "Gateway to the World", citing a new cargo terminal and customs facility designed to handle international cargo.

Passenger service has increased since Allegiant Air restarted service in 2012 with flights to 12 destinations. In 2018, MidAmerica Airport was named "Airport of the Year" for airports that see more than 10,000 passengers annually by the Illinois Department of Transportation. In 2021, a Bureau of Transportation study found it among the nation's five least-expensive airports.

=== Flight testing ===
In late April 2019, the first MQ-25 Stingray test aircraft (T-1 or "Tail 1") was taken by road from Boeing's technical plant at St. Louis's Lambert International Airport across the Mississippi River to MidAmerica St. Louis Airport, which is conjoined to Scott Air Force Base. Test flying was expected to commence at MidAmerica late in 2019, after taxi tests and the Federal Aviation Administration’s certifying the aircraft and granting airspace for flight testing. The first test flight occurred on September 19, 2019.

In Addition: "Boeing plans to build three new, state-of-the-art facilities in St. Louis ... These facilities, as well as the new Advanced Composite Fabrication Center in Arizona, and the new MQ-25 production facility at MidAmerica St. Louis Airport, represent more than a $1 billion investment."

== Facilities ==
=== Passenger facilities ===
From the onset, the passenger terminal was planned for easy expansion if needed. The passenger terminal sits in a 250-foot-wide by 700-foot-long expansion envelope bounded by a runway and parking lot. The initial build-out has two upper-level departure gates with jet bridges and some ground-level gates to serve smaller commuter aircraft.

In September 2020, the airport received $6.5 million in federal grants to expand the terminal. There are four phases to the terminal expansion. The first phase was completed in spring 2020. The second phase began in late 2020 and was to be completed in 2021. The final phase is to be completed by the end of 2023. The project will add 41,000 square feet to the existing terminal. This space will be used for a relocated and upgraded security checkpoint, two additional jet bridges, a service animal relief area, family restrooms, a nursing room, an expanded departure lounge and added room for concessions. It will also better accommodate people with disabilities.

=== Airfield facilities ===
- Dual Category II Instrument Landing Systems
- Simultaneous instrument approaches
- Runway 14L/32R, 10,000 feet
- Runway 14R/32L, 8,006 feet
- Unconstrained Air Traffic Control and air space environment
- Immediate Interstate access via I-64, I-44, I-55 and I-70
- Air cargo facility development sites ranging from 10 to 200+ acres
- An initial air cargo ramp of 258,000 square feet or 5.9 acres
- An air cargo terminal site adjacent to the ramp
- Air rescue and fire Index C facility, capable of adjustment, as operational requirements dictate
- New state-of-the-art control tower, 24-hours daily, seven days a week
- New fuel farm
- Aircraft handling services
- Foreign Trade Zone
- Enterprise Zone

=== Runways and taxiways ===
MidAmerica St. Louis Airport covers 7,003 acres (2,834 ha) and has two runways:

- Runway 14L/32R: 10,000 by 150 feet (3,048 x 46 m), surface: concrete, ILS equipped
- Runway 14R/32L: 8,006 by 150 feet (2,440 x 46 m), surface: asphalt/concrete, ILS equipped

MidAmerica's construction included the creation of the 10,000-foot (3,000 m) 14L/32R (east) runway, adding 1,000 feet (300 m) to the existing west runway, adding passenger and cargo terminals on the east side of the facility, and building a 7,000-foot (2,100 m) taxiway connecting the two runways. A new air traffic control tower staffed by Air Force personnel was constructed midway between the two runways.

In September 2022, construction began on an extension to Taxiway Lima as well as a new Taxiway Bridge over Crooked Creek to connect the airport to a new aviation business park. Taxiway construction was completed in 2023. A new Boeing Production Facility is already underway as the first tenant to build the MQ-25 unmanned aircraft.

=== Maintenance and operations ===
The civil operations are administered by St. Clair County, Illinois, which also pays the maintenance costs for the east runway. Over half of all air operations at the facility utilize the eastern runway.

== Airline and destinations ==
=== Passenger ===
Airlines	Destinations
Allegiant Air	Destin/Fort Walton Beach, Gulf Shores, Orlando/Sanford, Punta Gorda (FL), Sarasota, St. Petersburg/Clearwater; Seasonal: Fort Lauderdale, Jacksonville (FL), Las Vegas, Myrtle Beach, Savannah
Sun Country Airlines	Denver (begins May 28, 2027)

=== Cargo ===
Between late 2009 and August 2010, one air cargo company, LAN Cargo, used the airport to import flowers from Bogota, Colombia, totaling one flight each week until the county abruptly ended the flights.

Both Boeing Defense, Space & Security and North Bay Produce currently have facilities on site. North Bay Produce primarily ships blueberries from Michigan and Chile into the airport; they use a completely refrigerated warehouse for packaging and distribution. Boeing uses the facility at MidAmerica for sub-assemblies for multiple military aircraft.

=== Former ===
- On August 16, 2000, Pan American Airways (Pan Am) debuted at MidAmerica airport. In the spring of 2001, Pan Am was serving the airport as a stop on a Boeing 727-200 route between Orlando Sanford International Airport and Gary/Chicago International Airport. The airline was hit hard by the drop in airline travel after the 9/11 attacks, and ceased to operate at the airport on December 3, 2001.
- Great Plains Airlines began service in late 2003 with flights to Chicago-Midway Airport, Washington-Dulles Airport, and Tulsa. The carrier filed for bankruptcy in January 2004 and ultimately ceased all operations.
- TransMeridian Airlines began service at MidAmerica on November 21, 2004. The Atlanta-based airline filed for bankruptcy on September 29, 2005, then ceased service to all destinations.

== Statistics ==
USDOT's most current data indicates 308,000 passengers used BLV between January 2018 and December 2018 and the airport was ranked 204th in the United States. USDOT's Calendar Year 2016 data indicated 80,000 enplanements (157,000 total passengers), nearly triple the 2015 total. FAA's Calendar Year 2015 data indicated 32,589 enplanements (63,000 total passengers), nearly double the 2014 total. In calendar year 2014, the airport was ranked 363 in the United States with 16,328 passenger enplanements. This was a 20.57% increase over 2013. In calendar year 2013, the dual-use facility was ranked 373 in the United States with 13,542 passenger enplanements. This placed it ninth in the state of Illinois. By comparison, St. Louis Lambert International Airport was ranked 31 in the United States with over 6.21 million enplanements.

For the 12-month period ending December 31, 2020, the airport had 17,500 aircraft operations, an average of 48 per day: 57% military, 32% general aviation, and 11% scheduled commercial. At that time there were 34 aircraft based at this airport: 27 military, 5 helicopters, and 2 single-engine airplanes.

Busiest domestic routes out of BLV (June 2025 – May 2026)
Rank	Airport	Passengers	Carrier
1	Destin/Fort Walton Beach, FL	51,680	Allegiant
2	Punta Gorda, FL	33,820	Allegiant
3	St. Petersburg/Clearwater, FL	25,820	Allegiant
4	Orlando/Sanford, FL	23,140	Allegiant
5	Sarasota, FL	16,630	Allegiant
6	Gulf Shores, AL	14,620	Allegiant
7	Fort Lauderdale, FL	9,240	Allegiant
8	Las Vegas, NV	8,260	Allegiant
9	Jacksonville, FL	7,350	Allegiant
10	Myrtle Beach, SC	4,170	Allegiant

Total passengers (BLV)

Annual domestic passenger traffic
Year	Total passengers	% change
2005	28,000	—N/a
2006	49,550	+77.0%
2007	51,370	+3.7%
2008	47,030	−8.4%
2009	374	−99.2%
2010	274	−26.7%
2011	0	−100.0%
2012	3,830	—N/a
2013	25,550	+567.1%
2014	31,340	+22.7%
2015	62,730	+100.2%
2016	157,433	+151.0%
2017	245,028	+55.6%
2018	302,409	+23.4%
2019	303,801	+0.5%
2020	215,092	−29.2%
2021	318,802	+48.2%
2022	323,743	+1.5%
2023	292,697	−9.6%
2024	303,919	+3.8%
2025	384,000	+26.3%

== Public transportation ==
The St. Clair County Transit District (SCCTD) operates the MidAmerica Airport Shuttle, which offers service between the airport and the Shiloh–Scott station of MetroLink, the St. Louis region's light rail system. The trip takes about 20 minutes, with buses arriving every 40 minutes, starting three hours prior to the first scheduled flight of the day and continuing until 35 minutes after the last flight of the day.

The Red Line will provide direct service from the airport to downtown St. Louis. Additionally, MetroLink provides direct or indirect service to the Central West End, Clayton, Lambert Airport, and suburban areas in both Illinois and Missouri.

SCCTD has built an 5.2-mile (8.4 km) extension of MetroLink from Shiloh–Scott station to the MidAmerica St. Louis Airport station at MidAmerica Airport. The expansion includes a 2.6-mile (4.2 km) double-track section, a 2.6-mile (4.2 km) single-track section and a passenger station at the end of the alignment near the airport. The project received $96 million in funding from the State of Illinois in 2019. Design work was completed in the summer of 2022 and a request for proposals was released that November. In October 2026, construction on the extension was completed, and service will begin in November of 2026.

== See also ==
- List of airports in Illinois
