= Shiloh–Scott station =

Light rail station in St. Clair County, Illinois, US

Shiloh–Scott
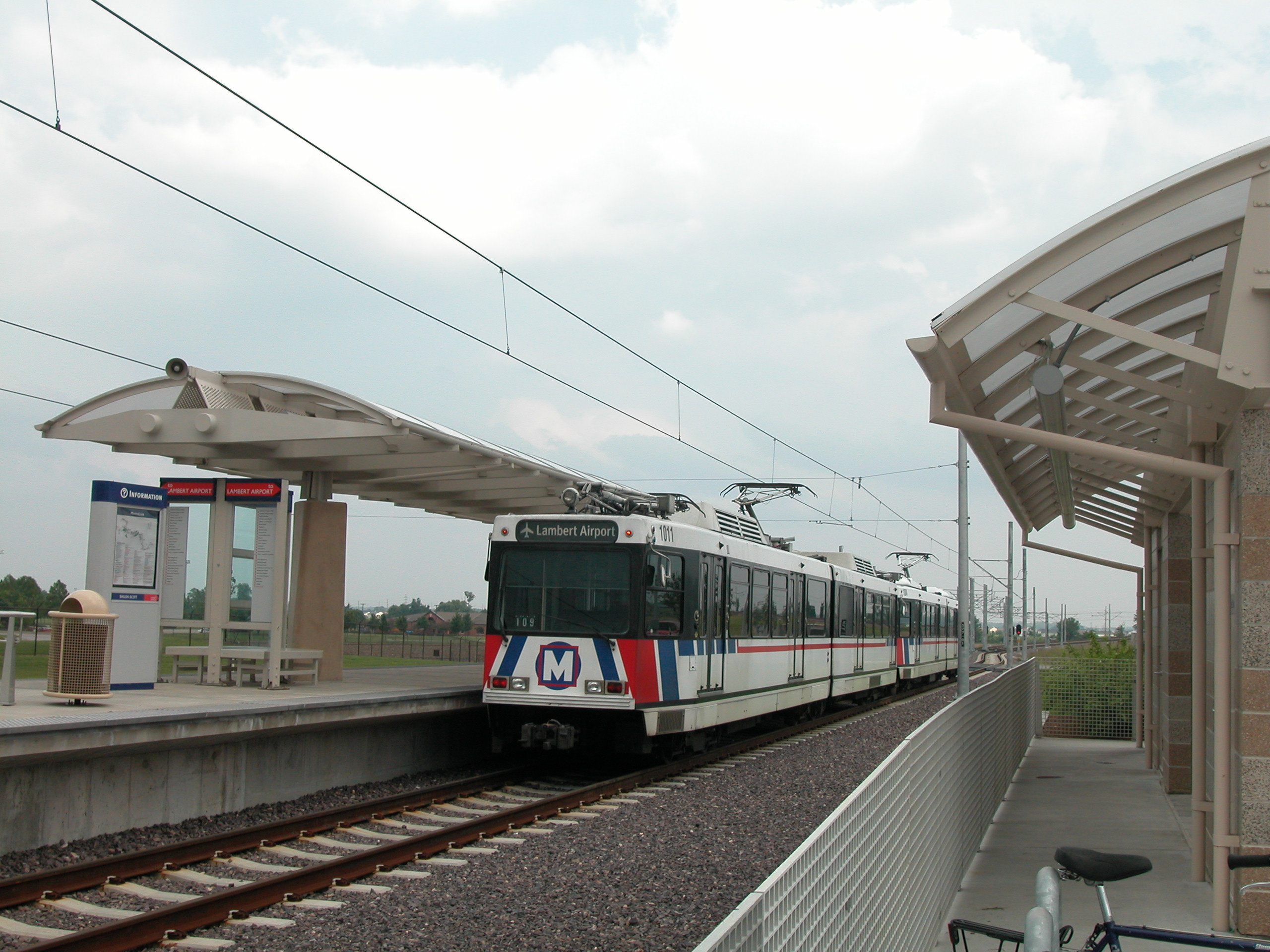
- Shiloh–Scott station platform

General information
- Location: 880 Metro Plaza Lane; Shiloh, Illinois
- Coordinates: 38.53888°N 89.87906°W
- Owner: Bi-State Development
- Operator: Metro Transit
- Platforms: 1 island platform
- Tracks: 2
- Bus stands: 7
- Connections: MetroBus Illinois: 12, 17X, 20X, 21, 21X; MidAmerica Airport Shuttle; SCCTD Flyer: Scott Air Force Base

Construction
- Structure type: At-grade
- Parking: 695 civilian spaces 421 military spaces
- Cycle facilities: Racks, MetroBikeLink Trail
- Accessible: Yes

History
- Opened: June 23, 2003

Passengers
- 2018: 549 daily
- Rank: 27 out of 38

Services
Preceding station	MetroLink	Following station
College toward Lambert Airport Terminal 1	Red Line	Terminus

Future services
Preceding station	MetroLink	Following station
College toward Lambert Airport Terminal 1	Red Line	MidAmerica St. Louis Airport Terminus
Location

Shiloh–Scott station is a light rail station and current terminus of the Red Line of the St. Louis MetroLink system. This at-grade station is located in Shiloh, Illinois, adjacent to Scott Air Force Base.

== History ==
Shiloh-Scott opened on June 23, 2003, as part of Phase 2 of the St. Clair County extension, which extended MetroLink 3.5 miles (5.6 km) from College to this station.

This station is the current terminus for the St. Clair County Transit District's 14-mile (23 km) MetroBikeLink shared-use path system. The 2.9-mile (4.7 km) segment connecting the College station to Shiloh-Scott opened in 2017.

== Station layout ==
The station is divided into two sections: one side is open to the general public and the other side to those with Scott Air Force Base security clearances. Each side has its own park and ride lot.

== Extension in progress ==
In 2019, the St. Clair County Transit District was awarded $96 million in Illinois infrastructure funding to build a 5.2-mile (8.4 km) extension of the Red Line from Shiloh-Scott to MidAmerica St. Louis Airport in Mascoutah. This extension will include two 2.6-mile (4.2 km) segments, a double-track and a single-track segment, along with a station at the airport. Construction on the extension began in 2023 with Metro expecting to begin operations in early 2026.
