= St. Clair County Transit District =

Overview
- Locale: St. Clair County, Illinois
- Transit type: Bus; Light rail Paratransit; Shared-use paths
- Number of lines: 14 bus routes 2 light rail lines 6 shared-use paths
- Number of stations: 11 (light rail) (1 under construction)
- Chief executive: Ken Sharkey
- Headquarters: 27 North Illinois Street; Belleville, Illinois, 62220
- Website: scctd.org

Operation
- Began operation: 1981
- Operators: Alternative Transportation System; Metro Transit

The St. Clair County Transit District (SCCTD) is a transit district that serves fifteen townships in St. Clair County, Illinois, a suburban county southeast of St. Louis. Operation of bus and light rail service is contracted to Metro Transit. Other services include paratransit and a network of shared-use paths.

== History ==
The St. Clair County Transit District was created in 1981 under the authority of the Illinois Mass Transit District Act, it levies a quarter-cent sales tax which funds MetroBus and paratransit service in the member townships.

Light rail first came to St. Clair County in 1993 with the opening of the 5th & Missouri MetroLink station in East St. Louis, the final station on the first 13.9-mile (22.4 km) line. That same year, with the success of the initial MetroLink alignment, St. Clair County voters passed a half-cent sales tax increase by a 2-1 margin to fund an extension to Scott Air Force Base. On May 14, 1994, the East Riverfront infill station opened within the eastern end of the Eads Bridge rail deck.

In 2001, the district opened a 17.4-mile (28.0 km) MetroLink extension to Southwestern Illinois College. The project cost $339.2 million, with $243.9 million paid by the Federal Transit Administration (FTA) and $95.2 million paid by SCCTD. Two years later a $75 million, 3.5-mile (5.6 km) extension brought service to Scott Air Force Base in Shiloh, Illinois. It was funded by a $60 million grant from the Illinois FIRST (Fund for Infrastructure, Roads, Schools, and Transit) Program and $15 million from SCCTD.

In 2002, SCCTD opened the first 4-mile (6.4 km) section of the MetroBikeLink trail system. Today the network has over 39 miles (63 km) of connected trails in Southwestern Illinois.

In 2019, Illinois provided the district $96 million in state funding to extend MetroLink from Shiloh-Scott to MidAmerica St. Louis Airport in Mascoutah. SCCTD began construction on the extension in 2023; Metro expects to begin operations in spring 2026.

== Services ==
=== MetroBus ===
SCCTD sponsors 14 MetroBus routes in St. Clair County:

No.	Name	Notes
1	Main Street - State Street	Route operates primarily along State and Main streets between the 5th & Missouri and Belleville transit centers. Intermediate stops include the Fairview Heights Transit Center and downtown Belleville.
2	Cahokia Heights	Route operates between the 5th & Missouri Transit Center and Cahokia Heights. Generally follows Mississippi Avenue, Falling Springs Road, and Camp Jackson Road. Intermediate stops include the St. Louis Downtown Airport and Cahokia High School.
3	Sauget - Water Street	Route operates primarily along Mississippi Avenue and Water Street between the 5th & Missouri Transit Center and Prairie Du Pont. Intermediate stops include Sauget Business Park.
4	19th & Central	Route operates from the 5th & Missouri Transit Center to 19th and Wilford. Generally follows Broadway, Bond Avenue, 19th Street, Wilford Avenue, and 17th Street.
5	Missouri Avenue - ML King	Route operates from the 5th & Missouri Transit Center and serves locations in central East St. Louis. Generally follows Missouri and St. Louis avenues.
6	Rosemont	Route operates between the Emerson Park and Fairview Heights transit centers. Intermediate stops include the Jackie Joyner-Kersee Center and Washington Park MetroLink stations.
8	Alta Sita	Route operates between the Emerson Park Transit Center and Cahokia Village. Generally follows 25th Street, Bond Avenue, and Route 157.
9	Washington Park	Route operates between the Emerson Park and Washington Park transit centers. Intermediate stops include the Jackie Joyner-Kersee Center MetroLink station.
12	O'Fallon - Fairview Heights	Route operates between the Fairview Heights and Shiloh-Scott transit centers. Serves various locations in O'Fallon including St. Clair Square.
13	Caseyville	Route operates between the Fairview Heights Transit Center and Collinsville. Generally follows Main Street and Morrison Avenue.
14	Memorial Hospital - Westfield Plaza	Route operates between the Memorial Hospital Transit Center and 74th Street at Westchester. Intermediate stops include Memorial Hospital, Country Club Plaza, and Westfield Plaza.
15	Belleville - O'Fallon	Route operates between the Belleville Transit Center and downtown O'Fallon. Intermediate stops include Green Mount Crossing and Memorial Hospital.
16	St. Clair Square	Route operates between the College Transit Center and downtown Collinsville. Generally follows Route 159 with intermediate stops at the Belleville and Swansea transit centers and St. Clair Square.
23	Belleville - College	Route operates between the Belleville and College transit centers. Primarily along State Route 161.

==== Airport Shuttle ====
SCCTD operates a shuttle between the Shiloh-Scott MetroLink station and MidAmerica St. Louis Airport seven days per week on a schedule that accommodates all daily flights. Rides cost $3.00 per one-way trip and each shuttle can accommodate 14 passengers.

=== MetroLink ===
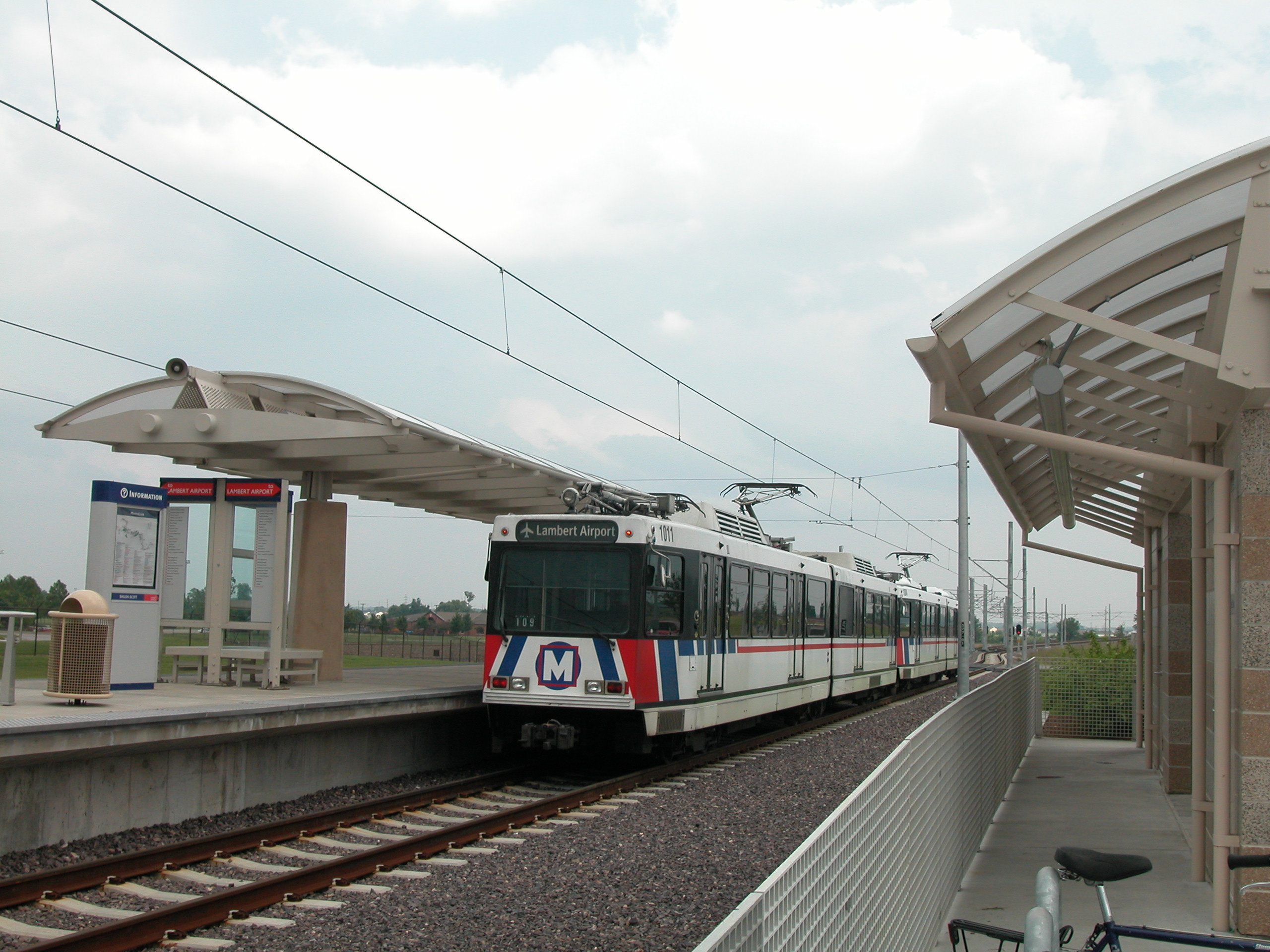
MetroLink at the Shiloh-Scott Station

MetroLink serves 11 light rail stations within St. Clair County. All 11 stations are served by the Red Line, while six are served by the Blue Line.

In 2019, the district was awarded $96 million in Illinois infrastructure funding to build a 5.2-mile (8.4 km) extension of the Red Line from Shiloh-Scott to MidAmerica St. Louis Airport in Mascoutah. This extension will include two 2.6-mile (4.2 km) segments, a double-track and a single-track segment, along with a station at the airport. Construction on the extension began in 2023 with Metro Transit expecting to begin operations in early 2026.

=== Paratransit ===
The St. Clair County Transit District operates paratransit service for riders who are certified as Americans with Disabilities Act (ADA) eligible and those aged 60 and older. The service is operated by the Alternative Transportation System (ATS).

=== SCCTD Flyer ===
The SCCTD Flyer is an app-based, on-demand microtransit service provided by Via Transportation with the St. Clair County Transit District. The Flyer operates in six service zones including; Belleville, Brooklyn, East St. Louis, Fairmount City, Scott Air Force Base, and a Mobility on Demand (MOD) zone around Mascoutah. Rides cost $1.00 per one-way trip to or from Metro Transit Centers and $3.00 per one-way trip from the MOD zone.

== See also ==
- Bi-State Development Agency
- Madison County Transit
- Metro Transit (St. Louis)
- Transportation in St. Louis
