= Metro Transit (St. Louis) =

Public transit operator in the St. Louis metropolitan area

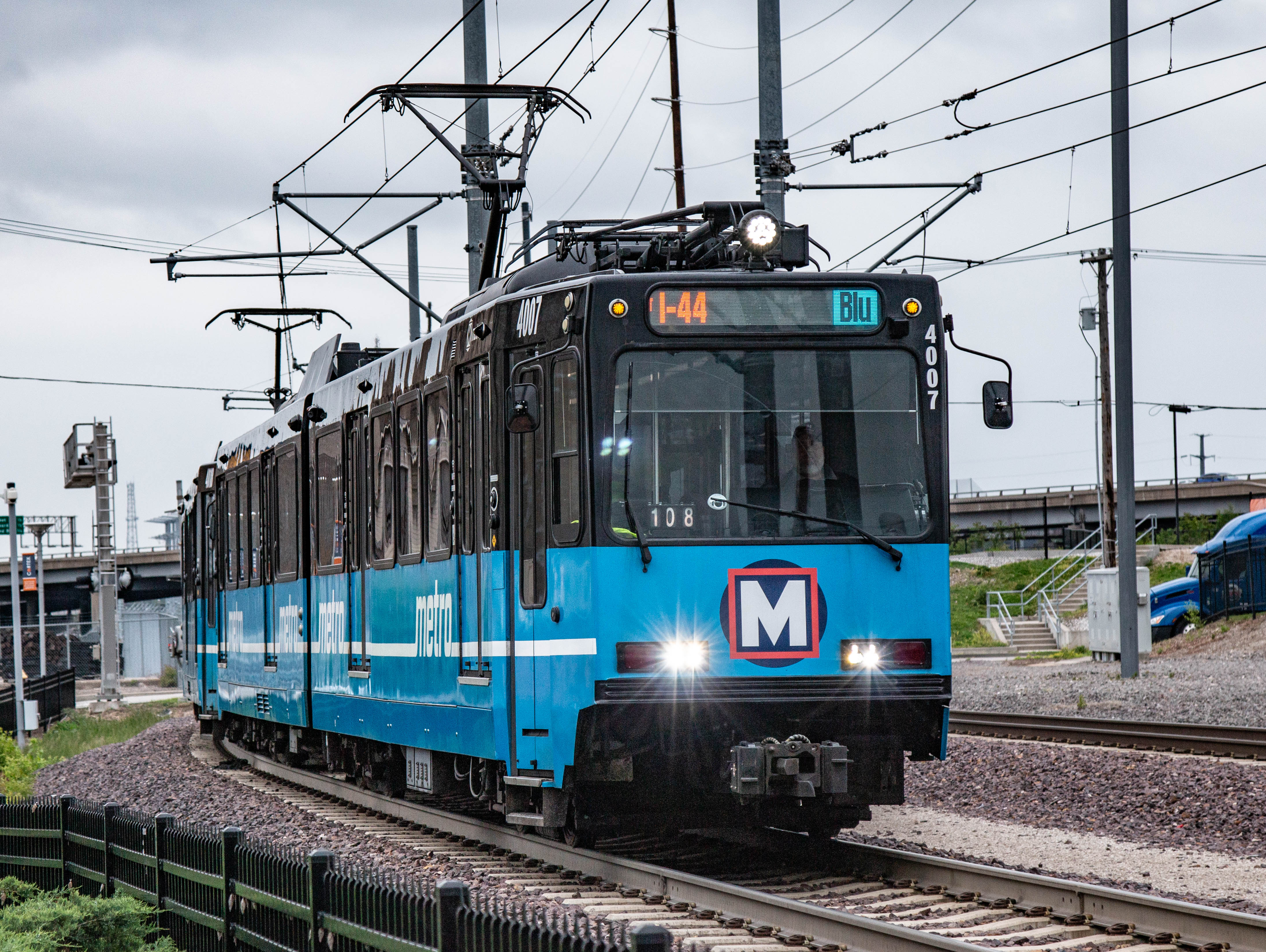
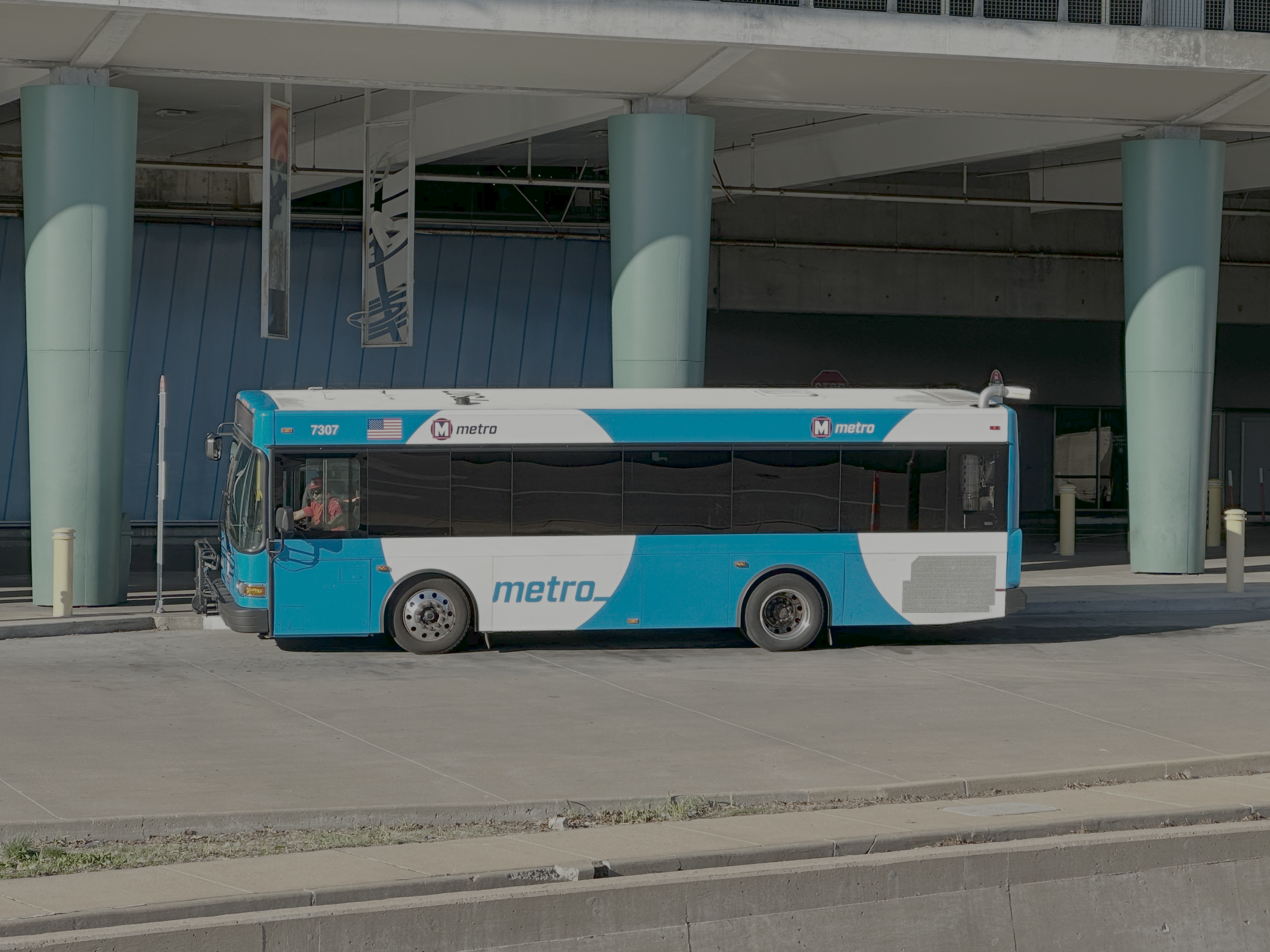
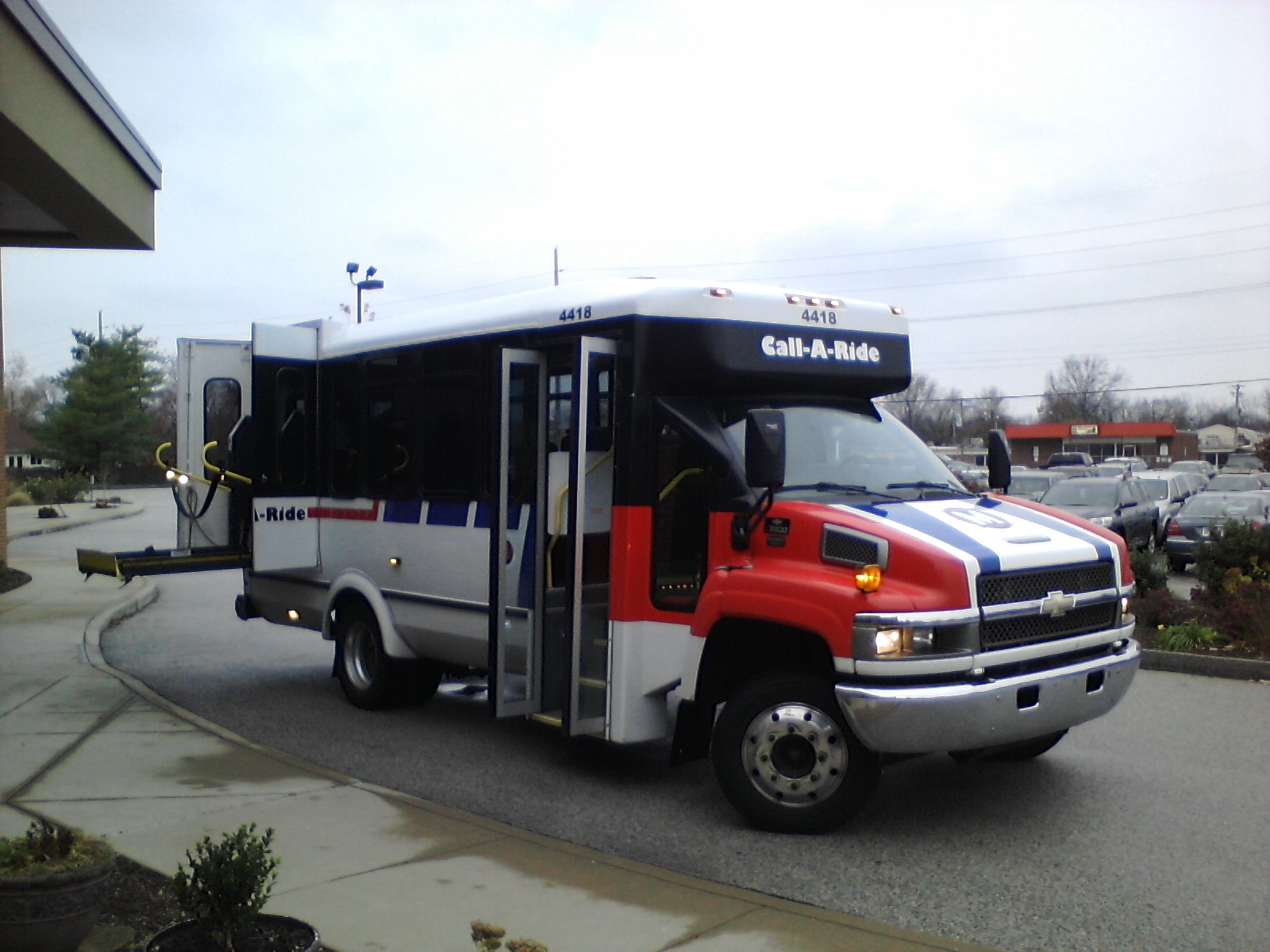
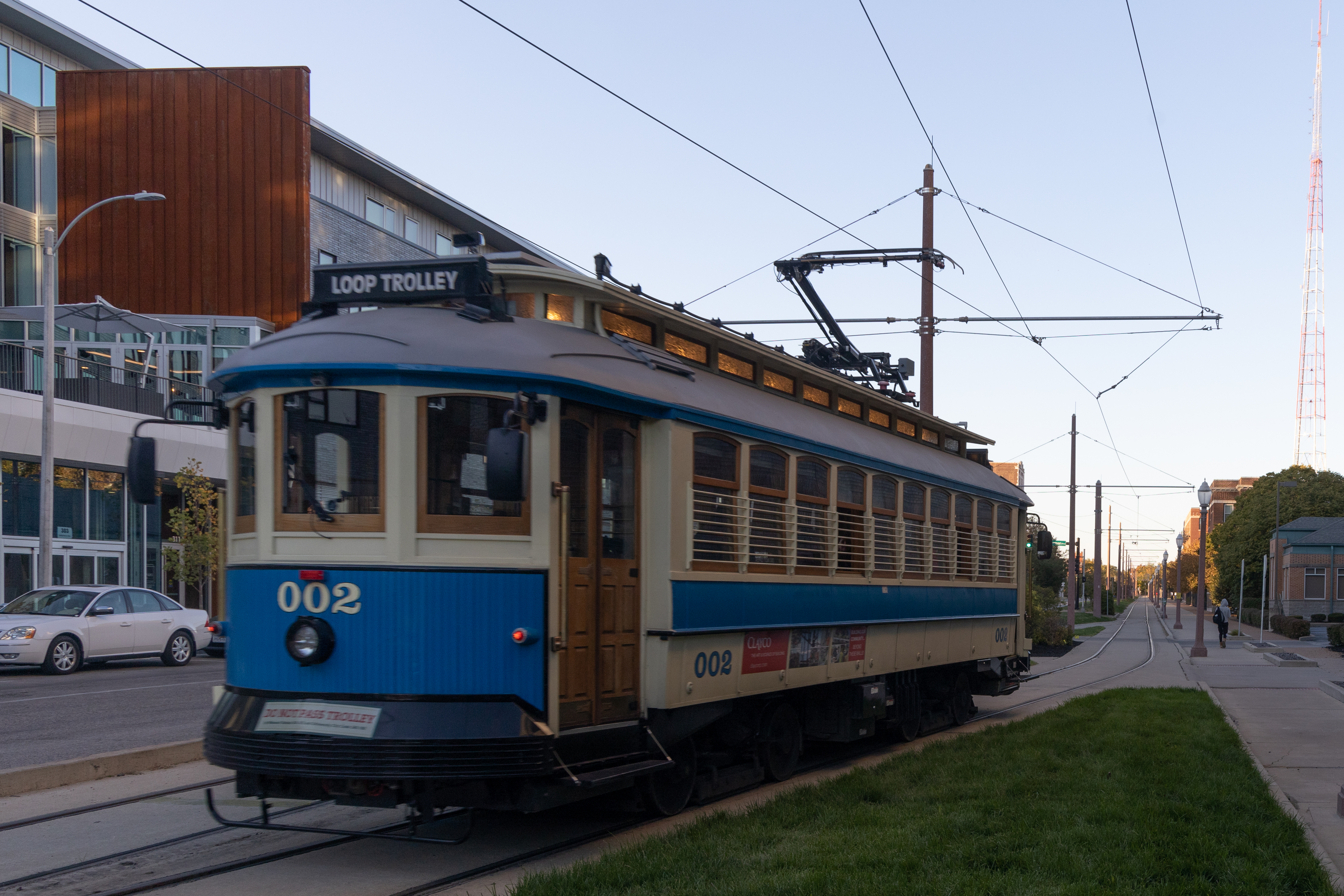
- Metro Transit services: MetroLink, MetroBus, Call-A-Ride, Loop Trolley

Overview
- Owner: Bi-State Development Agency
- Locale: Greater St. Louis, Missouri–Illinois, U.S.
- Transit type: Bus; Light rail Streetcar; Paratransit
- Number of lines: 58 bus routes 2 light rail lines 1 streetcar line
- Number of stations: 5,000+ (bus); 38 (light rail); 10 (streetcar); 25 (transit centers); 26 (park and ride lots)
- Daily ridership: 64,600 (weekdays, Q2 2026)
- Annual ridership: 19,575,000 (2025); 12,350 (2024, Loop Trolley)
- Chief executive: Taulby Roach
- Headquarters: One Metropolitan Square; 211 North Broadway; St. Louis, Missouri, 63102, U.S.
- Website: metrostlouis.org

Operation
- Began operation: 1963; 63 years ago
- Reporting marks: BSDA
- Number of vehicles: 22 Siemens SD-400s; 50 Siemens SD-460s; 276 Diesel buses 24 Electric buses 123 Call-A-Ride vans 2 Gomaco Brill replica streetcars

Metro Transit is the main public transit operator in the Greater St. Louis region, which spans the states of Missouri and Illinois in the Midwestern United States. Its services include bus, light rail, streetcar, microtransit, and paratransit.

Metro Transit's service area includes the city of St. Louis and St. Louis County in Missouri and St. Clair County, Illinois. The agency is an enterprise of the Bi-State Development Agency, an interstate compact established in 1949. In 2025, the system had an annual ridership of 19,575,000, or about 64,600 per weekday as of the second quarter of 2026.

== History ==
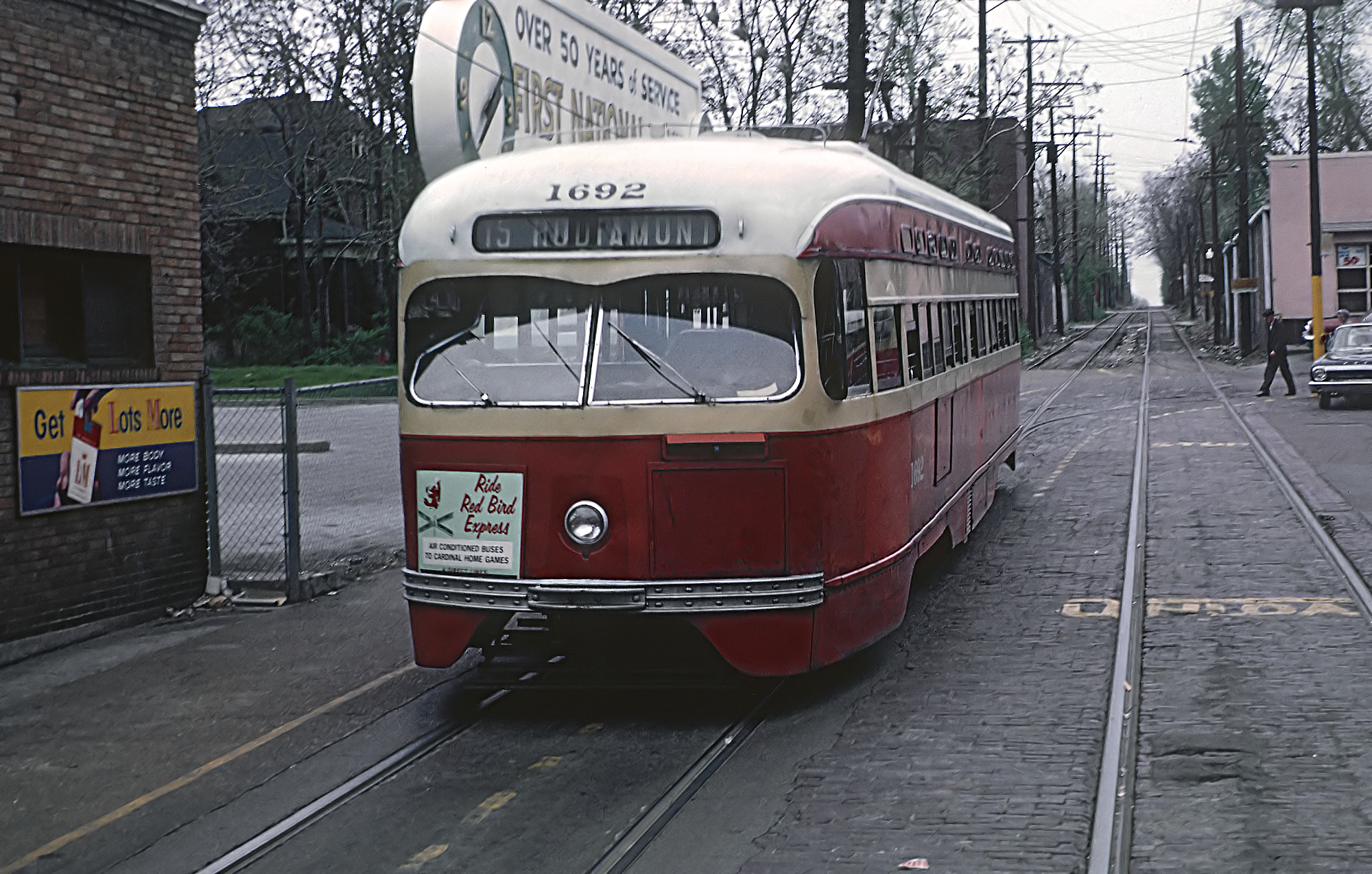
A #15 Hodiamont streetcar near Wellston in April 1963

The enterprise now known as Metro Transit was founded in 1963 when the Bi-State Development Agency, using a $22.5 million bond issue, purchased and consolidated 15 privately owned transit operators to sustain efficient and reliable public transportation in the region. These services would operate under the Bi-State name until 2003, when the agency would begin operating as Metro. In 2015, the Bi-State Development name would be resurrected for the parent organization and the public transit enterprise renamed Metro Transit.

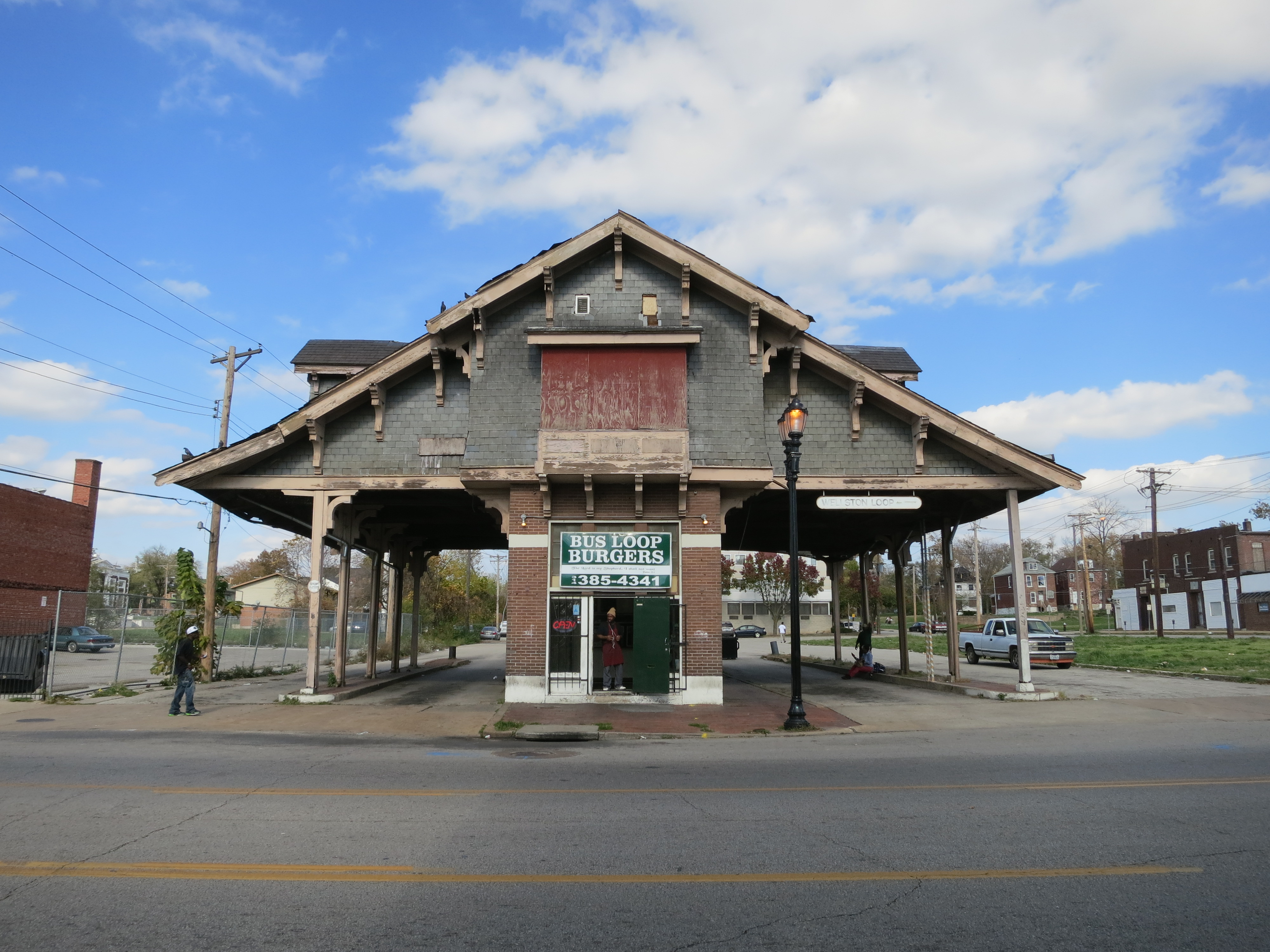
The abandoned Wellston Loop station on the former Hodiamont Line in 2012

In the 1960s, after taking over the private operators, Bi-State consolidated bus lines and in 1966 shut down the St. Louis region's last streetcar service, the Hodiamont line. Its right-of-way was paved over and replaced with buses. In 2018, Great Rivers Greenway began soliciting feedback for turning the 3.5-mile (5.6 km) former transit corridor into a greenway.

In the 1970s, the system became one of the first in the United States to use buses equipped with wheelchair lifts. In June 1973, with a financial crisis approaching, Bi-State threatened to end all bus service at the end of that month. In response, the Missouri General Assembly passed the Transportation Sales Tax Act allowing St. Louis and St. Louis County to levy a half-cent sales tax for public transportation. With the additional funding, Bi-State lowered the bus fare from 40 cents to 25 cents.

In the 1980s, Metro Call-A-Ride began demand-response service to help people whose physical or cognitive disabilities prevented them from independently using regular fixed-route bus service. In 1986, Arts in Transit, Inc. was founded, which is a 501(c)(3) organization that ensures the integration of local art and design in the transit system. In 1987, the East-West Gateway Council of Governments completed a study that recommended light rail with an integrated bus network as the next step forward for the St. Louis region’s public transit system.

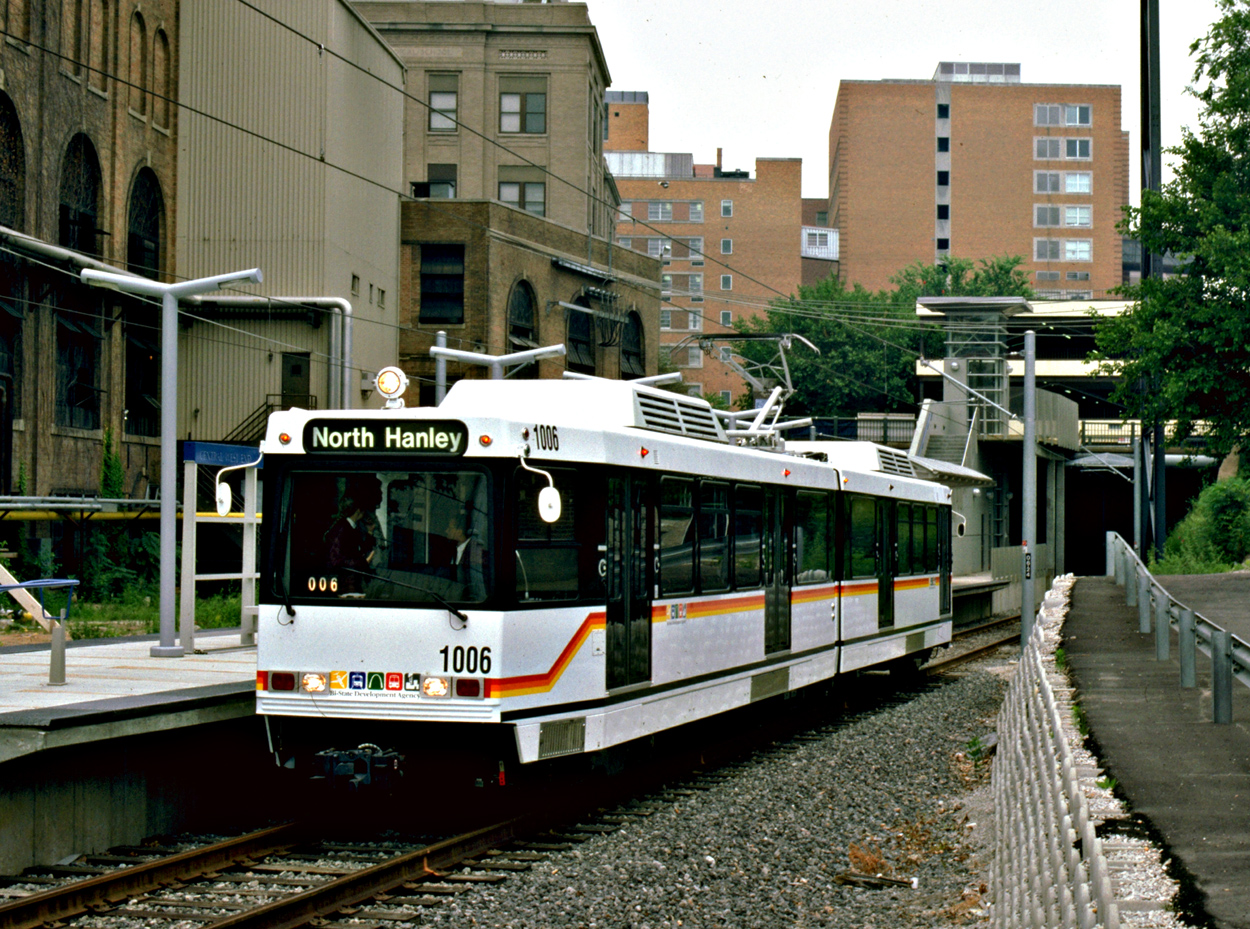
MetroLink at Central West End shortly after opening in 1993

Construction on the region's first light rail line began in 1990 by reusing former railroad rights-of-way including downtown subway tunnels and the Eads Bridge. The first 13.9-mile (22.4 km) segment opened on July 31, 1993, between the North Hanley and 5th & Missouri stations. The remainder of this initial alignment was completed on June 25, 1994, when the extension to Lambert Airport Main opened. Three infill stations have been added to this original alignment. East Riverfront in 1994, Lambert Airport East in 1998, and Cortex in 2018. In 2001, MetroLink doubled in length with a 17.4-mile (28.0 km) extension to Southwestern Illinois College in St. Clair County. Two years later, a 3.5-mile (5.6 km) extension brought service to Shiloh, Illinois. In 2006, Metro opened the 8-mile (13 km) Cross County extension running from the Forest Park-DeBaliviere station to Shrewsbury, Missouri.

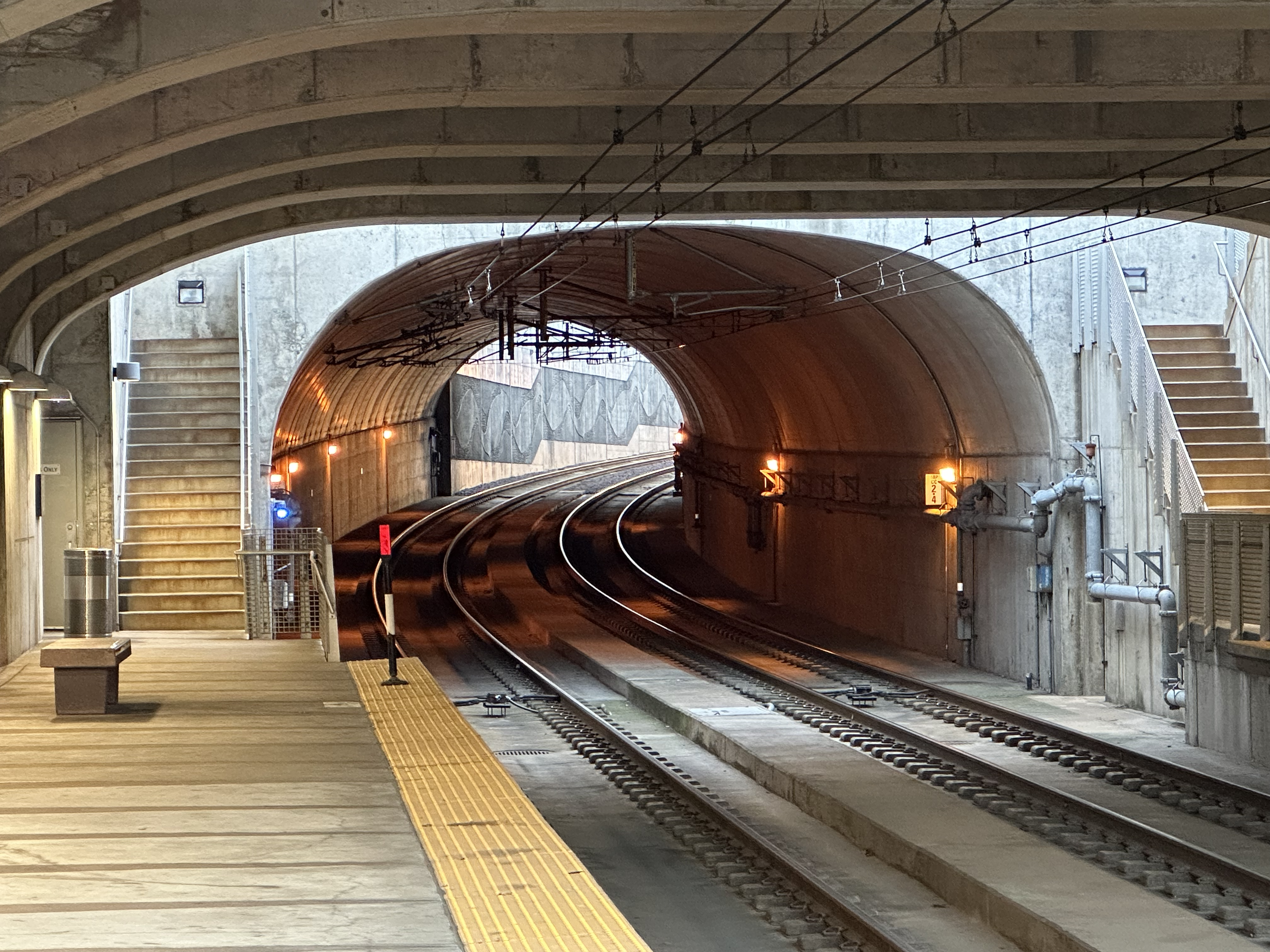
Forsyth MetroLink station on the Blue Line in 2023

After St. Louis County voters defeated Proposition M in 2008, Metro shelved all expansion plans and was forced to cut 24 Missouri bus routes. In 2010, County voters passed Proposition A, a half-cent sales tax increase, to restore service cuts and fund system expansion under the banner of Moving Transit Forward. In 2013, the St. Louis County Council authorized loaning Metro $400 million of surplus Proposition A funds to pay off debt related to the Cross County extension. In 2017, St. Louis City voters passed Proposition 1, a half-cent sales tax increase estimated to generate $12 million per year for MetroLink expansion. In 2019, the State of Illinois provided the St. Clair County Transit District (SCCTD) $96 million in funding to extend MetroLink from Shiloh-Scott to MidAmerica St. Louis Airport in Mascoutah, Illinois. SCCTD began construction on the extension in 2023; Metro is expected to begin operating it in spring 2026.

In 2021, Metro introduced the region's first electric buses: 40-foot and 60-foot articulated models. In February 2022, Bi-State's board voted in favor of Metro taking over operation of the troubled Loop Trolley. Later that year, Metro reopened the trolley and received a $1.26 million grant from the East-West Gateway Council of Governments to operate the service on a seasonal schedule for the next several years. In November 2024, Metro announced the Loop Trolley ended that season within budget and with a 44% increase in ridership.

On July 26, 2022, a flash flood shut down MetroLink for nearly 72 hours and caused roughly $40 million in damage. The flood damaged nearly 5 miles (8.0 km) of track bed, two elevators, two communications rooms, three signal houses and destroyed two MetroLink vehicles and a Call-A-Ride van. By that September, normal Red Line service had resumed while restricted service continued on the Blue Line. On July 31, 2023, Metro received $27.7 million in federal emergency disaster relief funding to help cover the cost of restoration. In March 2024, Blue Line platform and speed restrictions were lifted after repairs on the last signal house were completed.

In May 2023, Metro received a $196.2 million federal grant to purchase new light rail vehicles to replace the remaining SD-400 cars. Six months later, Bi-State's board approved a contract with Siemens Mobility worth up to $390.4 million for as many as 55 battery-hybrid S200 light rail vehicles with delivery expected to begin in early 2027. In September 2024, turnstiles began initial operation at four Illinois stations as part of Metro's Secure Platform Plan. Seven Missouri stations were completed in early 2025 with the remaining stations and an upgraded fare collection system expected to be in place by 2026. In July 2026, the new turnstiles and fare collection system became fully operational at 26 MetroLink stations. The remaining 12 stations became operational on August 17th.

In September 2023, Bi-State's board approved an $18.9 million contract with Northside-Southside Transit Partners to study a potential $1.1 billion MetroLink expansion dubbed the Green Line. A locally preferred alternative (LPA) was selected by the East-West Gateway Council of Governments in February 2024. In September 2025, the proposed light rail line was scrapped due to budgetary constraints and questions over federal funding. However, planning for the corridor continued and would change to study the feasibility of bus rapid transit.

In June 2026, East-West Gateway approved an 11.5-mile (18.5 km) bus rapid transit alignment that features 23 stations and connects to MetroLink at Civic Center in downtown St. Louis. Estimated costs for the line are between $360 million and $590 million with a projected yearly ridership of 1,300,000.

== Services ==
=== MetroBus ===
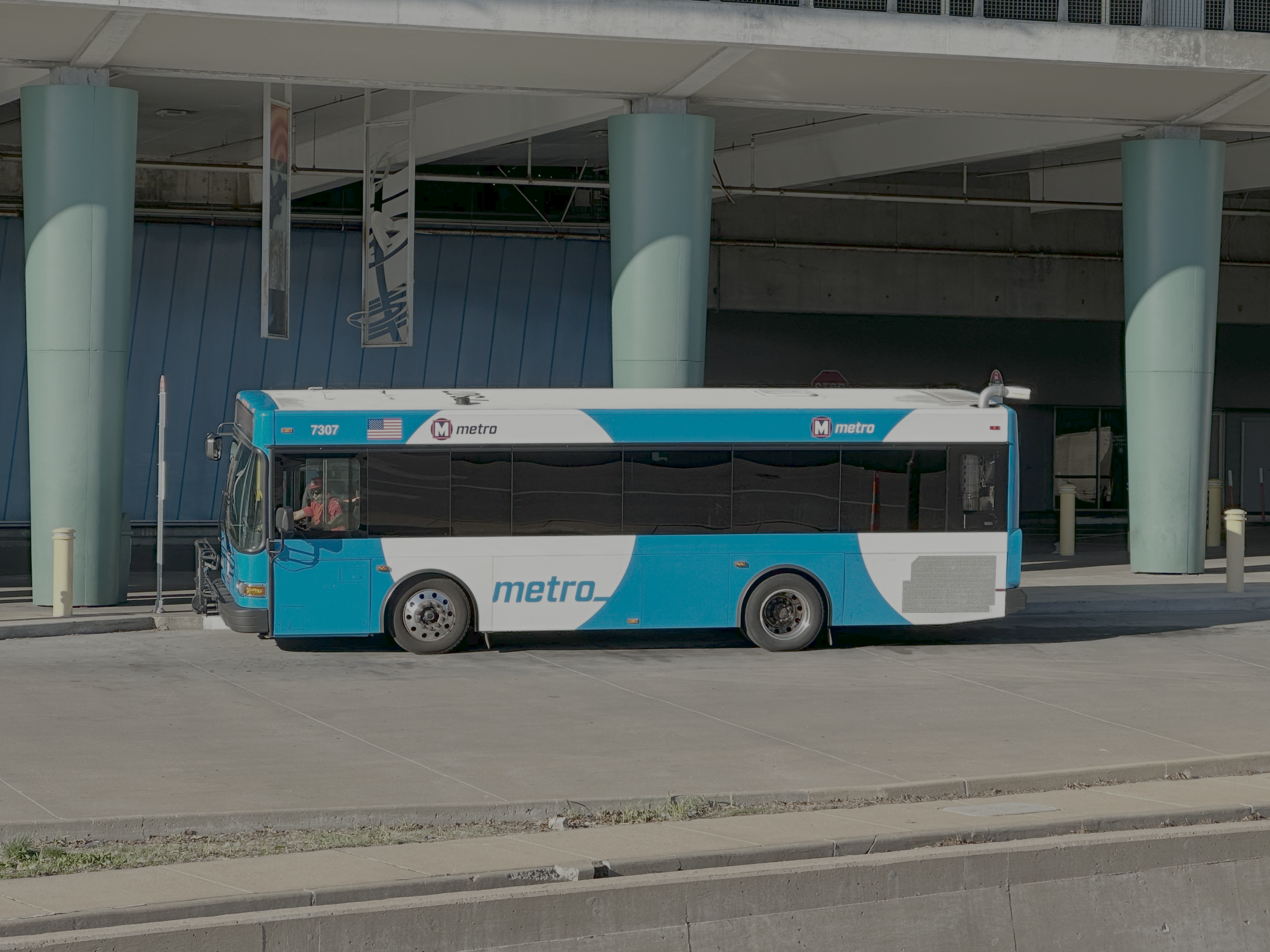
A MetroBus at Clayton in 2026

Since 1963, Metro Transit has continuously provided bus service in the Greater St. Louis region. Metro currently operates 44 fixed bus routes in Missouri and 14 fixed bus routes in Illinois. In September 2019, Metro launched Metro Reimagined, a restructuring of Missouri bus routes that increased frequency on busy routes and discontinued six low-ridership routes. That same year, Metro also removed or relocated more than 360 of the system's 5,400 bus stops. In June 2021, Metro introduced the region's first electric buses including 40-foot and 60-foot articulated models. The 60-foot articulated buses are used exclusively on the #70 Grand bus line, the region's busiest.

In 2020, the onset of the COVID-19 pandemic caused a sharp decline in MetroBus ridership and initiated a labor shortage that had reduced Metro's ability to offer comprehensive service to passengers. In an effort to recruit more drivers, Bi-State's board signed a contract in August 2023 with Amalgamated Transit Union Local 788, which approved salary increases and a signing bonus. By the end of 2024, MetroBus had increased its operator ranks from 556 to 673 allowing it to increase frequency or add service on 35 Missouri and 7 Illinois routes, including the addition of four new routes.

=== MetroLink ===
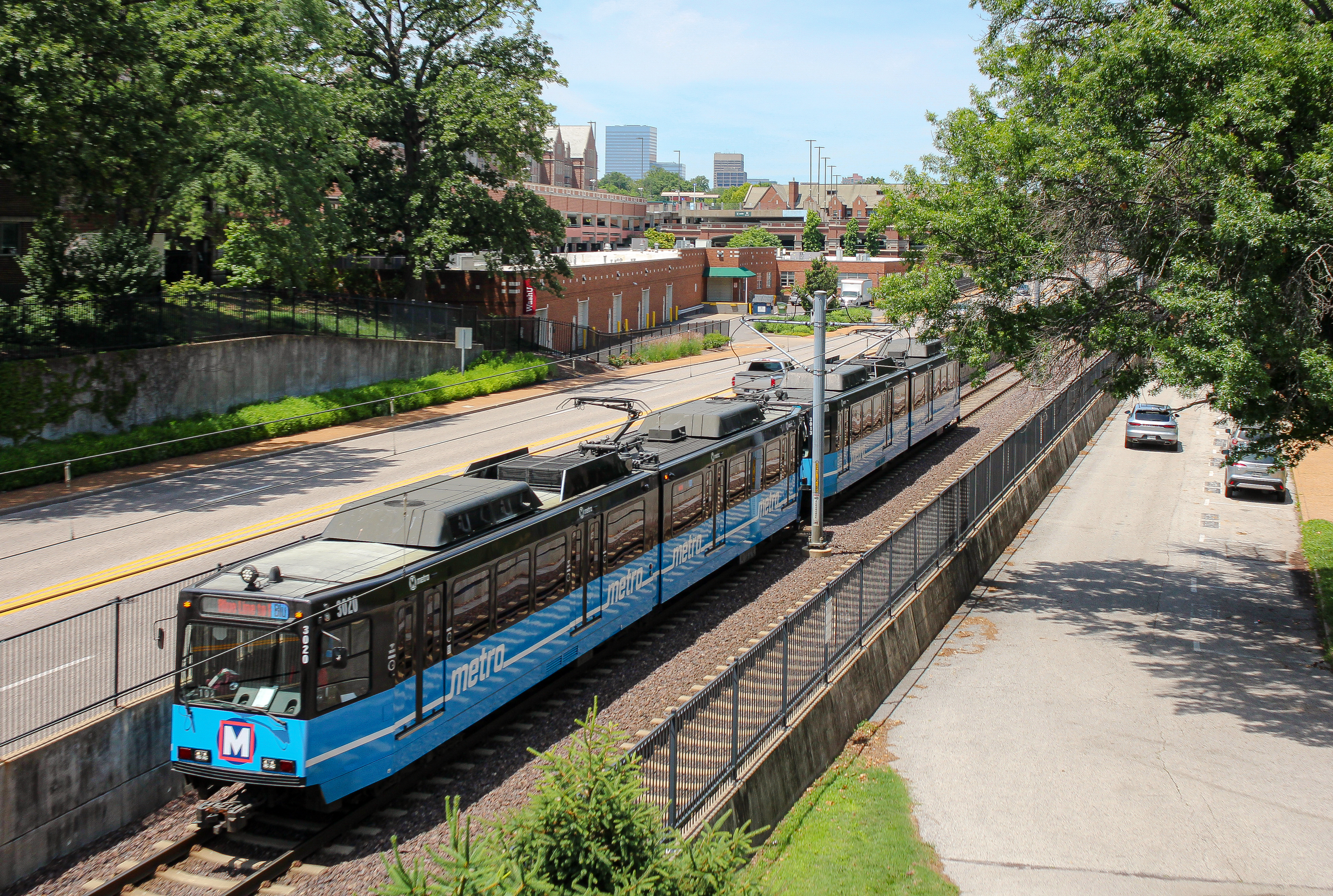
An eastbound MetroLink train on the Blue Line

Since 1993, Metro Transit has operated light rail service in the Greater St. Louis region. Today, the system consists of the Red and Blue lines, with 38 stations and 46 miles (74 km) of track. The Red Line runs from St. Louis Lambert International Airport in northwest St. Louis County to Shiloh, Illinois, near Scott Air Force Base in southeast St. Clair County. The Blue Line, opened in 2006, connects Shrewsbury, Missouri, to the Red Line at Forest Park-DeBaliviere. A 5.2-mile (8.4 km) extension of the Red Line from Shiloh-Scott to MidAmerica St. Louis Airport in Mascoutah broke ground in 2023 and is expected to be operational by 2026.

While officially light rail, MetroLink features many characteristics of a light metro or rapid transit service, including a completely independent right of way, a higher top speed, and level boarding at all platforms.

=== Metro Call-A-Ride ===
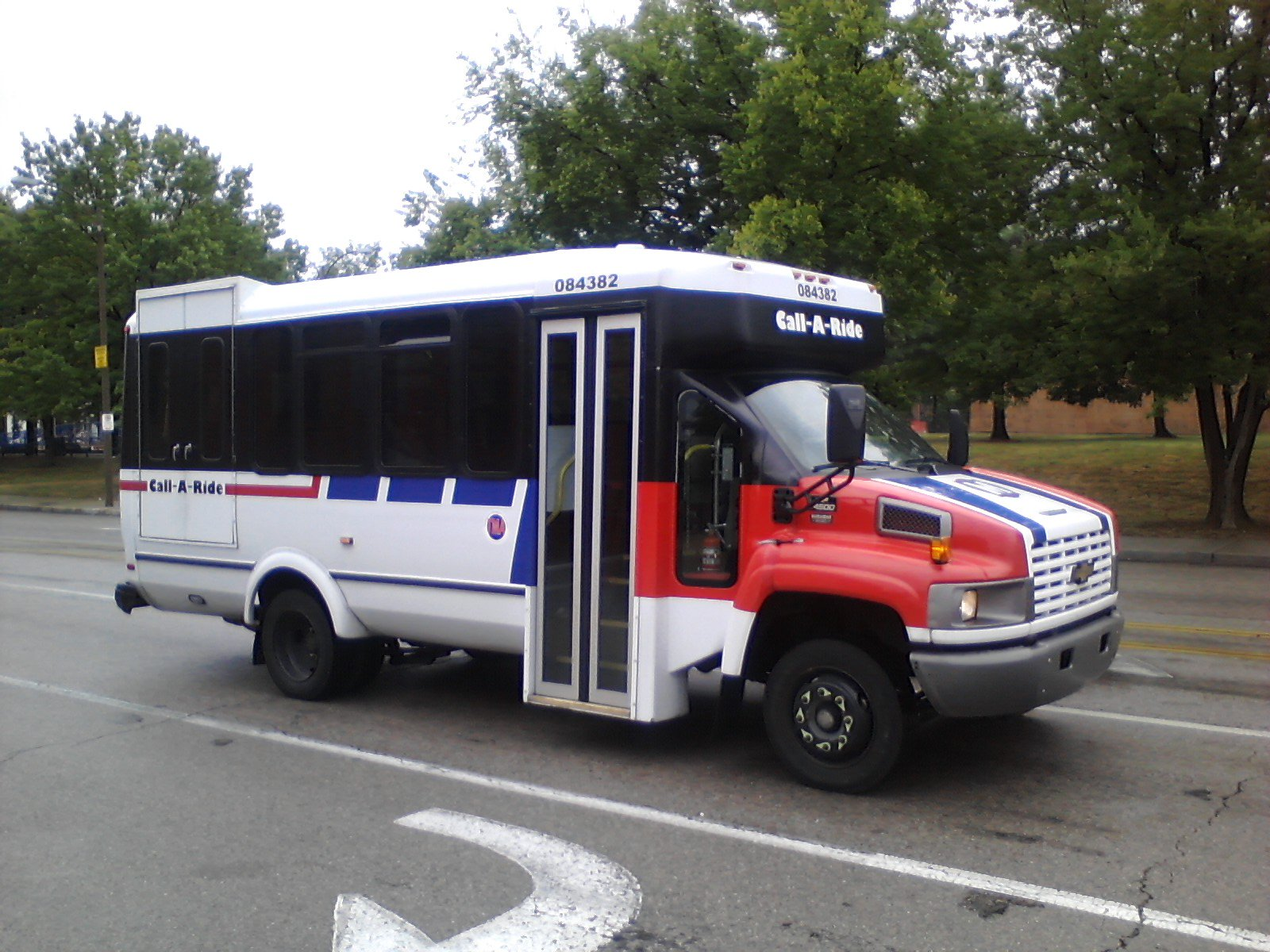
A Metro Call-A-Ride van in 2011

Since 1987, Metro Transit's Call-A-Ride demand response service has provided alternative transportation to residents who have limited access to MetroBus or MetroLink and/or disabled residents who are unable to use those services. In April 2023, in response to operator shortages, Metro announced that it would reduce its service area for Call-A-Ride, primarily in southwest and far north St. Louis County, a move that drew criticism.

=== Via Metro STL ===
Via Metro STL is an app-based, on-demand microtransit service provided by Via Transportation with Metro Transit. The service launched in June 2020 to serve exurban areas of St. Louis County with few bus stops and limited MetroLink service. It provides rides in three service zones; North, South and West. In 2024, the service completed 277,623 rides.

=== Loop Trolley ===
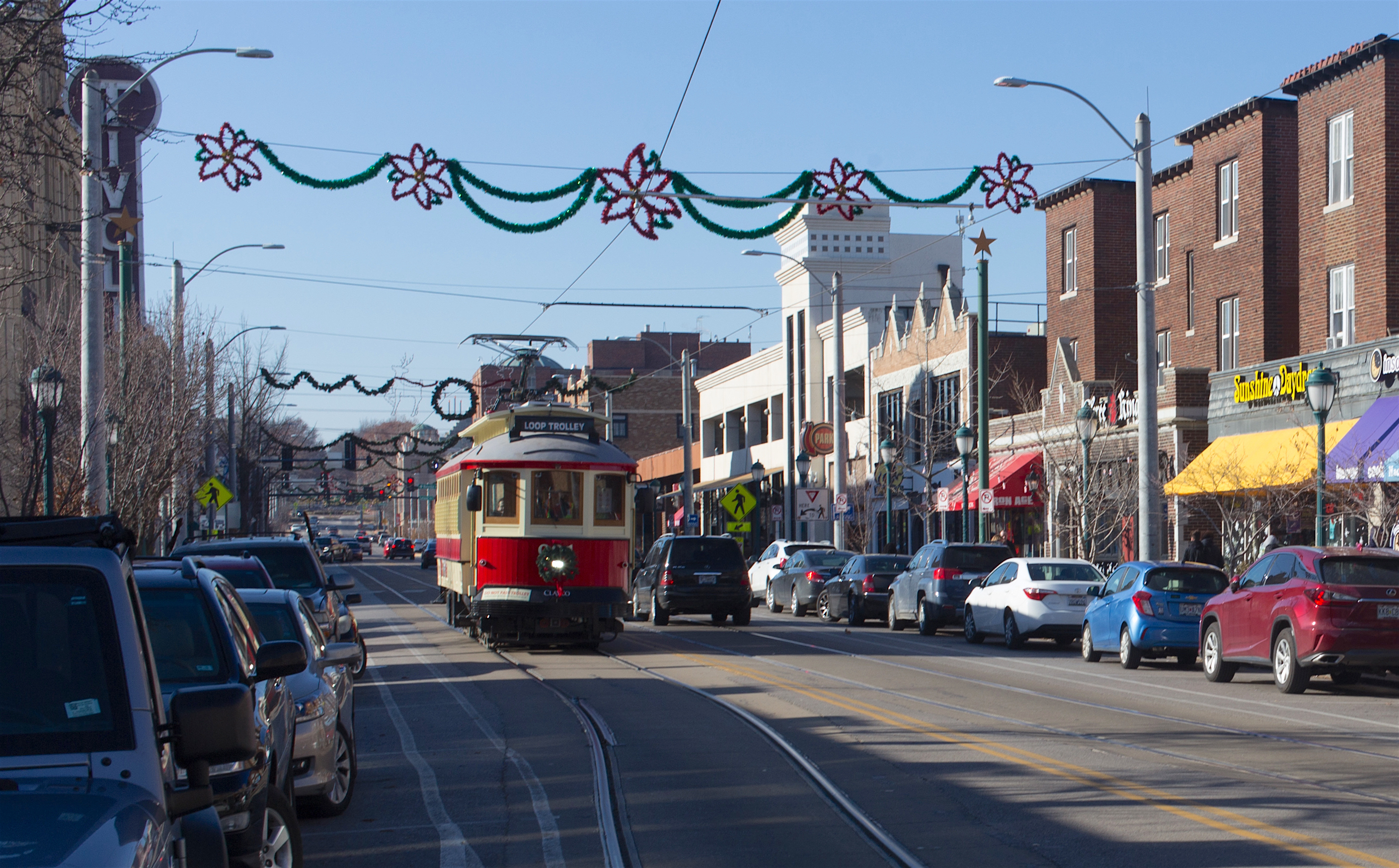
The Loop Trolley on Delmar Boulevard in 2018

The Loop Trolley is a 2.2-mile (3.5 km) heritage streetcar line that runs from City Hall in University City to the Missouri History Museum and Forest Park in St. Louis. The 10-station line travels along Delmar Boulevard through the Delmar Loop and DeBaliviere Avenue between Delmar and Forest Park. Connections can be made to MetroLink at both the Delmar Loop and Forest Park–DeBaliviere stations.

On February 18, 2022, Bi-State's board voted in favor of Metro Transit taking over operations after several financial setbacks and closures. In August 2022, Metro reopened the trolley and received a $1.26 million grant from the East-West Gateway Council of Governments to operate the service on a seasonal schedule for the next several years. In November 2024, Metro announced the Loop Trolley ended that season within budget and with a 44% increase in ridership. Additionally, at its current service level further funding requests would not be necessary.

== Fares ==
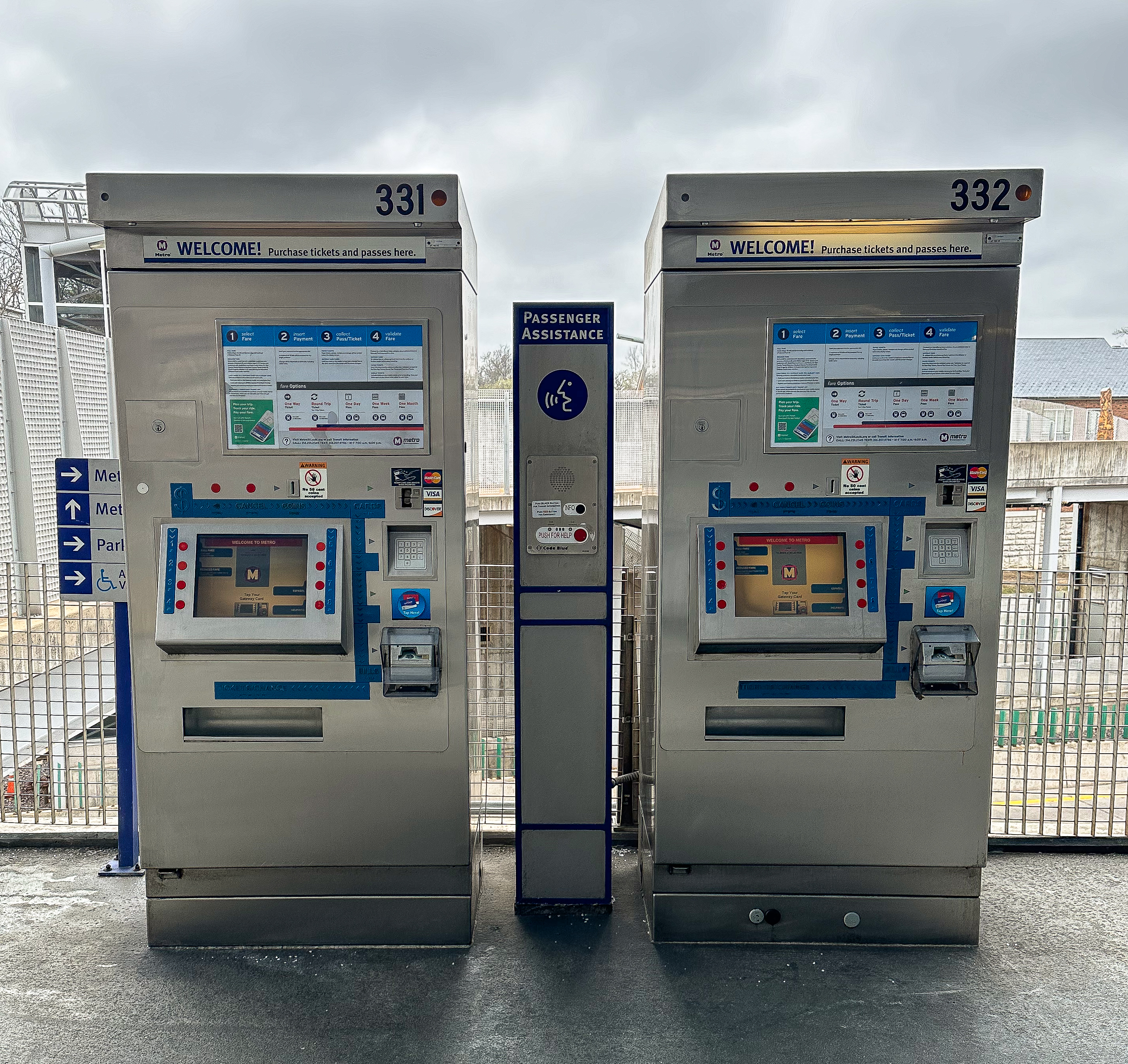
Ticket vending machines at Clayton in 2024

In 2026, Metro Transit converted from a proof-of-payment system to a paid access system. Proof-of-payment required riders to present passes on demand to security personnel while paid access requires riders to purchase a pass or use a mobile app to operate the turnstile.

As of 2026, the base fare is $2.50 when paid in cash or $3 for a two-hour pass with a transfer that can be purchased on the Transit app. When boarding MetroBus, riders with valid passes present them to the operator and those without passes are able to pay exact change into the onboard farebox.

Metro also accepts some fares from Madison County Transit (MCT) on its services. MCT's 2-hour regional pass is accepted as full fare on MetroBus and MetroLink and its senior/ADA passes qualify as reduced fare on Metro services. In addition, Metro's 2-hour pass/transfer is valid for a single bus trip on MCT with no additional charge.

Residents called to jury duty in Metro's service area may travel on MetroBus and MetroLink free of charge.

== Fleet ==
=== Buses ===
Metro Transit operates 308 vehicles for MetroBus, including 276 35- and 40-foot low-emission, low-floor diesel buses made by Gillig; 10 electric 40-foot Gillig buses; and 14 electric 60-foot articulated New Flyer XE60 buses. Electric buses are charged overnight at the Brentwood and DeBaliviere garages, while in-service charging is at the North Broadway Transit Center. Each MetroBus vehicle has a two-bike bike rack, available first-come, first-served.

Metro also operates 123 Call-A-Ride vans.

All MetroBus and Call-A-Ride vehicles have an accessible lift or ramp and include priority seating.

=== Trains ===
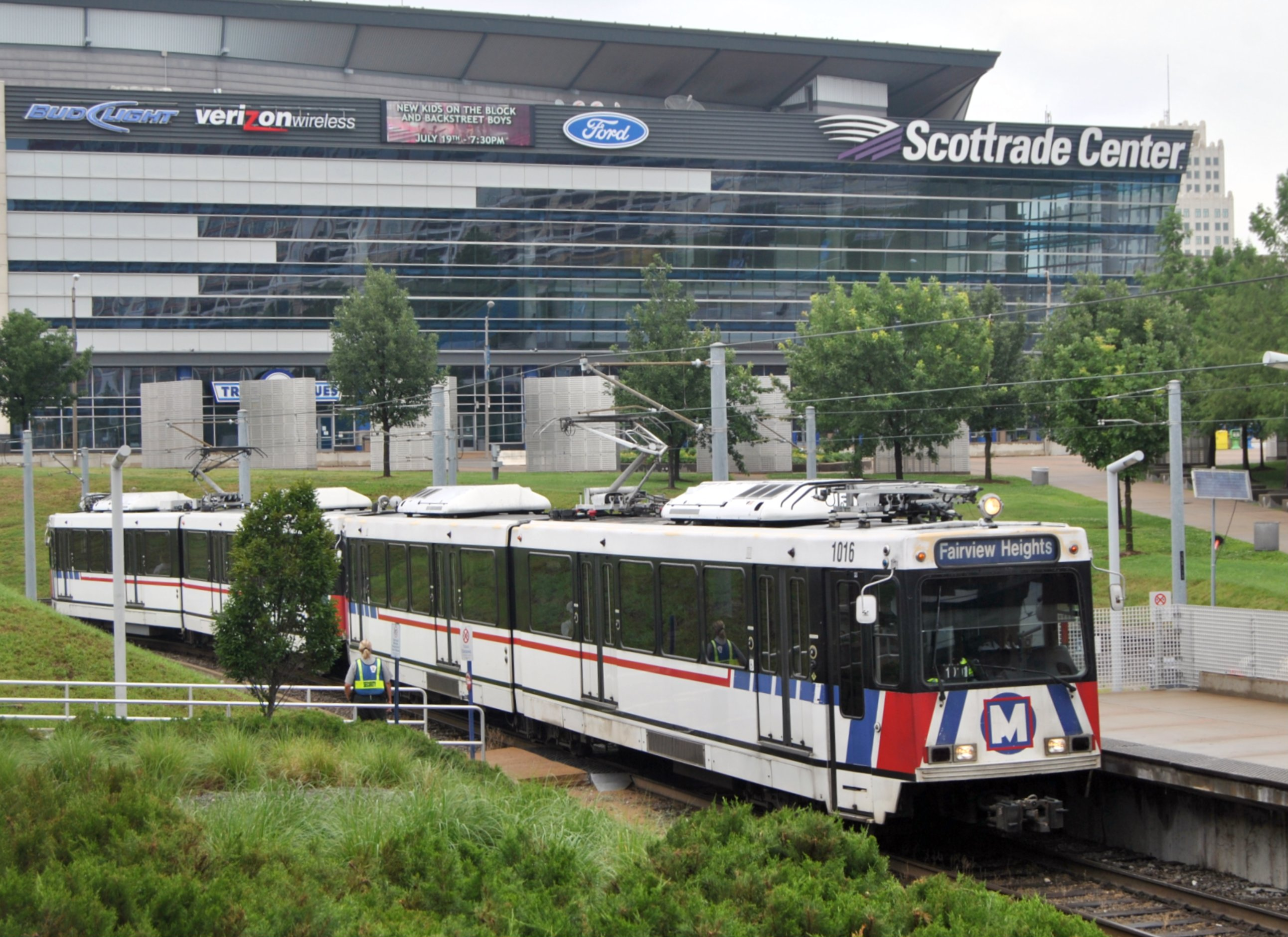
An SD-400 train set with the old livery

At its largest, Metro Transit operated a fleet of 87 Siemens light rail vehicles for MetroLink, including 31 SD-400 cars and 56 SD-460 cars. As of 2024, Metro operated 22 SD-400s and 50 SD-460s. Two SD-460s were destroyed in a July 2022 flash flood. Metro services trains at its Ewing and 29th Street rail yards. All light rail vehicles are accessible and include priority seating and spaces for those using mobility devices. Riders may walk bicycles onto the rear of the first train car and the front and rear of the second car.

In May 2023, Metro received a $196.2 million federal grant to purchase a fleet of new Siemens S200 light rail vehicles to replace the remaining SD-400 cars. Six months later, Bi-State's board approved a contract with Siemens Mobility worth up to $390.4 million for as many as 55 battery-hybrid light rail vehicles to replace aging rolling stock. The onboard traction batteries would allow a train to travel 5 miles (8.0 km) without overhead catenary wire. Delivery of the new vehicles is expected to begin in 2027. Meanwhile, Metro is refurbishing many of the remaining SD-460 cars for continued use.

Metro currently operates two Gomaco-built Council Crest replica streetcars from Portland, Oregon for the Loop Trolley. Both vehicles were modified for wheelchair accessibility to meet ADA regulations before entering service. Previously, the district owned three ex-Melbourne, Australia W2-type streetcars that had operated on Seattle's Waterfront Streetcar, these three units were returned to Gomaco in 2024.

=== Liveries ===
Metro Transit has a similar livery across all of its services except its battery-electric buses and the Loop Trolley. In 2019, Metro began phasing in a new livery for its vehicles. Previously, MetroLink vehicles had a white base with a red stripe running horizontally beneath the windows that turned into a dashed blue stripe near each operator cab. The front included Metro's "M" logo centered between vertical blue, red, and white lines. MetroBus and Metro Call-A-Ride were similar, except the red stripe continued around the rear of the vehicles.

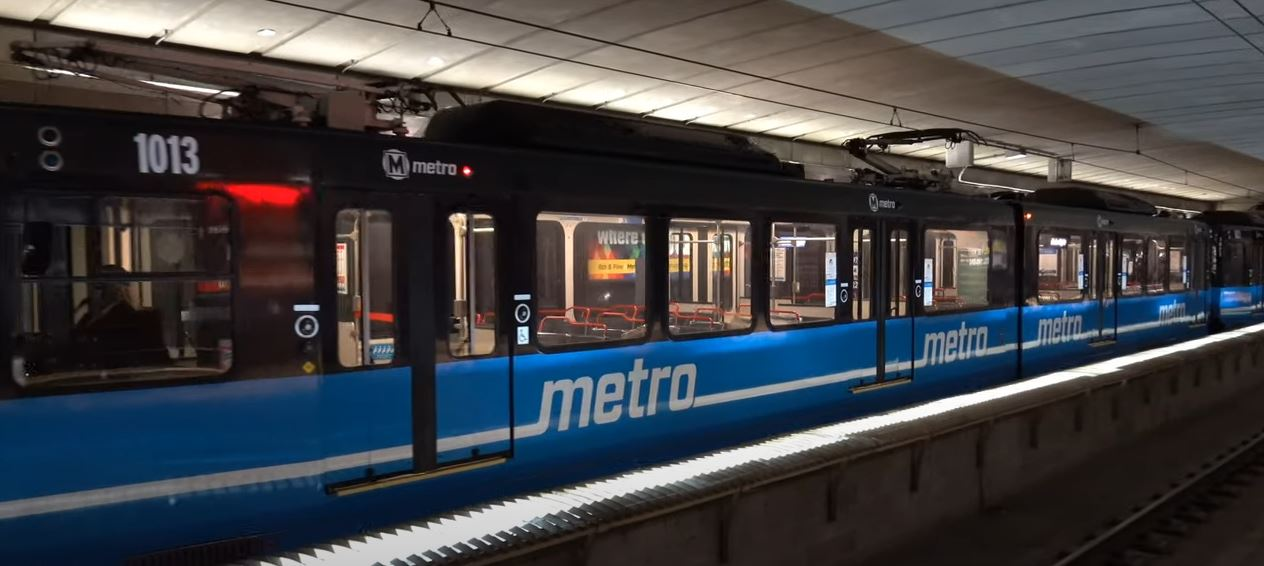
A MetroLink train with the new livery

The new livery is made up of a blue base with white accents. On MetroLink, the stripe was moved further below the windows so the word "metro" could be inlaid within it and the tops of the cars were painted black. Metro Call-A-Ride uses this same design. MetroBus includes two large white circles on either side of the bus. The horizontal stripe has been eliminated, save for a small portion on either side of the word "metro." All three services retained Metro's "M" logo on the front of their vehicles.

Metro's battery-electric buses are a shade of lime green on the front and rear with shades of blue in the center accented by a green leaf pattern. A white stripe runs horizontally near the base with the word "metro" and an image of a power plug inlaid within it. This livery is part of a partnership with Ameren Missouri.

In January 2024, the agency announced that it would cease to sell advertising that covers the exterior of buses and trains, citing aesthetic reasons. The 144 exterior advertisement spaces had generated up to $1.5 million annually through contractor Vector Media but had also drawn complaints.

== Organization ==
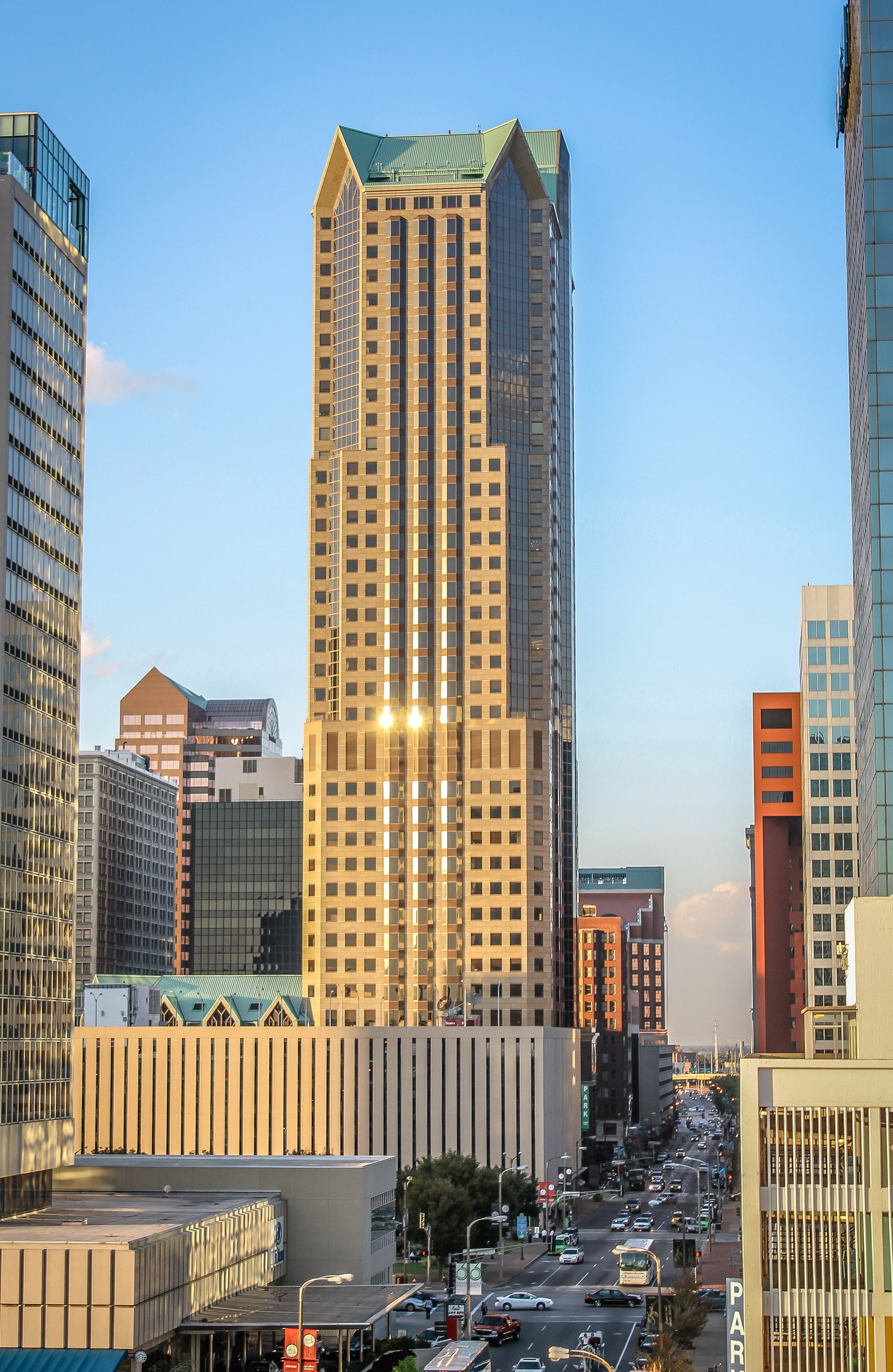
One Metropolitan Square, Metro Transit's headquarters

=== Leadership ===
Metro Transit's executive leadership is made up of President and CEO Taulby Roach and Executive Vice President and COO Ronald D. Forrest. As an enterprise of the Bi-State Development Agency, Metro's leadership answers to Bi-State's Board of Commissioners. As of 2024, the agency had roughly 2,000 employees.

=== Security ===
Security for the Metro system is provided by contracted uniformed police and Metro's own security guards. Known as "bumblebees" for their neon-yellow and black uniforms, Metro security guards enforce fare collection and other rules, patrol trains, and help passengers. The system also has contracts for officers with the St. Louis County Police Department, the St. Louis Metropolitan Police Department, the St. Clair County Sheriff’s Department and the St. Louis City Sheriff’s Department.

Security features in vehicles, stations and transit centers include lights, closed-circuit television monitoring, emergency telephones, police and security patrols, and radio communication between operators and MetroBus and MetroLink control centers.

Kevin Scott is the General Manager of Security for Metro Transit.

=== Funding ===
Metro's operating budget is funded by sales taxes from the city of St. Louis and St. Louis County and the St. Clair County Transit District. Other funds come through federal and state grants and fare-paying passengers. Metro's operating budget in FY2025 is $328,980,534 in addition to a 3-year capital budget of $1,037,311,983. Combined sales tax appropriations between the three supporting jurisdictions is estimated at $312 million in FY2025 with federal grant revenue estimated at $4.2 million and Missouri state funding estimated at $750,000. Passenger revenue is estimated at $21.8 million.

In 1973, the Missouri General Assembly passed the Transportation Sales Tax Act which allowed St. Louis, St. Louis County and Kansas City to levy up to a half-cent sales tax for public transportation. In 1981, the Illinois General Assembly passed the Local Mass Transit District Act allowing counties to levy up to a quarter-cent sales tax for public transportation. Additional ballot initiatives are listed in the table below:

Sales tax ballot initiatives
| Ballot measure | Year | County | Sales tax | Result |
|---|---|---|---|---|
| Transportation Sales Tax Act | 1973 | City of St. Louis | 0.5% | Passed |
| Transportation Sales Tax Act | 1973 | St. Louis | 0.5% | Passed |
| Local Mass Transit District Act | 1981 | St. Clair | 0.25% | Passed |
| Proposition M | 1993 | St. Clair | 0.5% | Passed |
| Proposition M | 1994 | City of St. Louis | 0.25% | Passed |
| Proposition M | 1994 | St. Louis | 0.25% | Passed |
| Proposition M | 1996 | St. Charles | 0.5% | Failed |
| Proposition M | 1996 | St. Charles | 0.5% | Failed |
| Proposition M | 1997 | City of St. Louis | 0.25% | Passed^{†} |
| Proposition M | 1997 | St. Louis | 0.25% | Failed |
| Proposition M | 1997 | Madison | 0.5% | Failed |
| Proposition M | 2008 | St. Louis | 0.5% | Failed |
| Proposition A | 2010 | St. Louis | 0.5% | Passed |
| Proposition 1 | 2017 | City of St. Louis | 0.5% | Passed |
†

== Projects in progress ==
=== MidAmerica Airport extension ===
In 2019, the St. Clair County Transit District was awarded $96 million in Illinois infrastructure funding to build a 5.2-mile (8.4 km) extension of the Red Line from Shiloh-Scott to MidAmerica St. Louis Airport in Mascoutah. This extension will include two 2.6-mile (4.2 km) segments, a double-track and a single-track segment, along with a station at the airport. Construction on the extension began in 2023 with Metro expecting to begin operations in 2026.

=== MetroLink rehabilitation ===
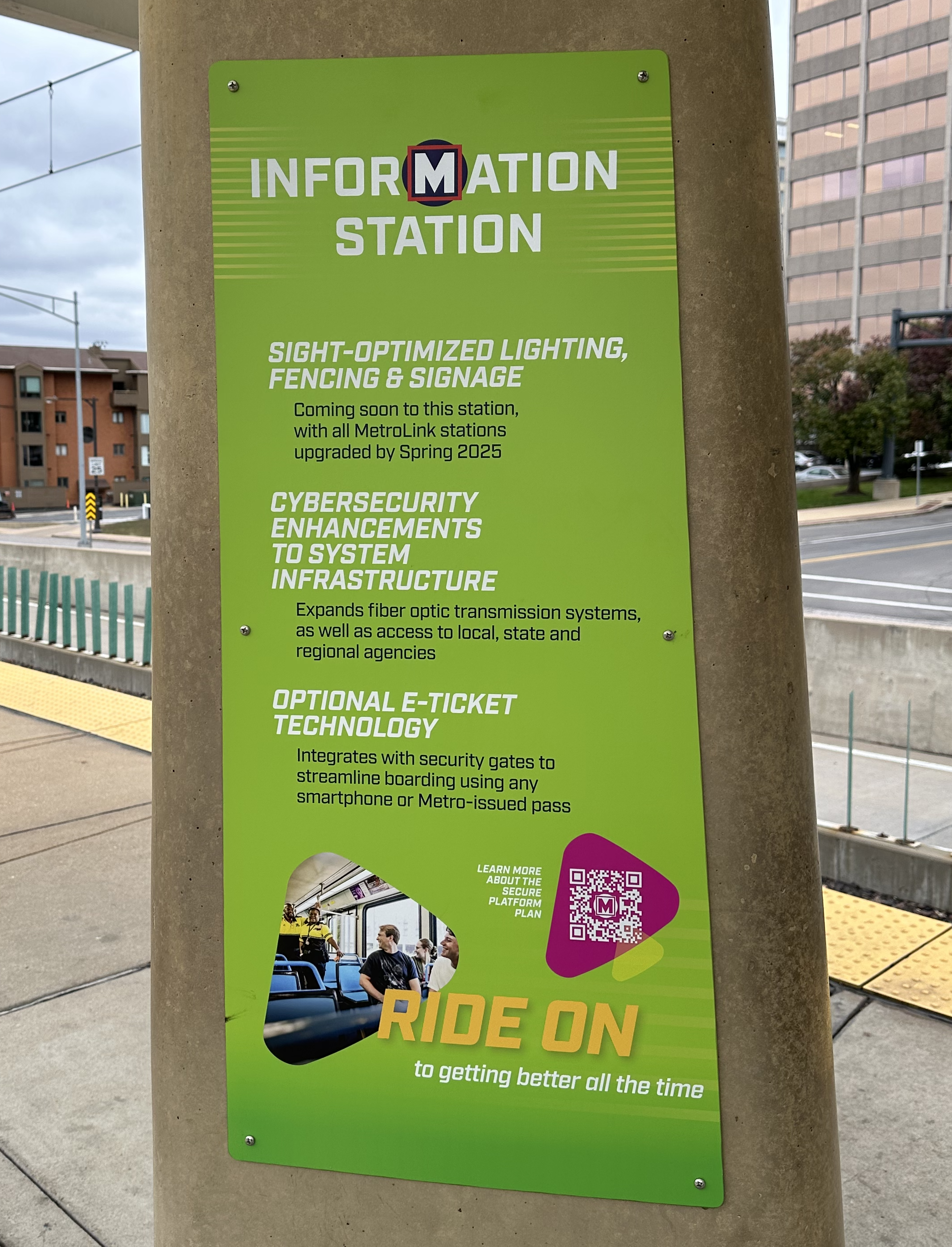
A sign at Clayton in 2024 detailing upcoming station work

In 2023, Metro began a system-wide rehabilitation program that will last several years. That spring, Metro began rehabilitating the downtown subway tunnels, including the Laclede's Landing, Convention Center, and 8th & Pine stations. Elsewhere, catenary wire, curve tracks, platforms, retaining walls, staircases, and system conduit are to be upgraded or replaced.

Beginning in 2025, Metro will start rehabilitating the Union Station tunnel with rehabilitation of the Cross County tunnels beginning in 2026. The latter will include the renovation of the Skinker and University City–Big Bend subway stations and the construction of a storage siding near the Richmond Heights station. In 2026, Metro expects to complete upgrades to the Supervisory Control Automated Data Acquisition (SCADA) and Public Address/Customer Information (PA/CIS) systems. The upgraded SCADA/PA/CIS will operate as an integrated system that monitors and controls operations and will allow Metro to provide real-time arrival information to passengers, such as live displays at stations. Real-time arrival displays began operation at all stations on May 28th, 2026.

=== Secure Platform Plan ===
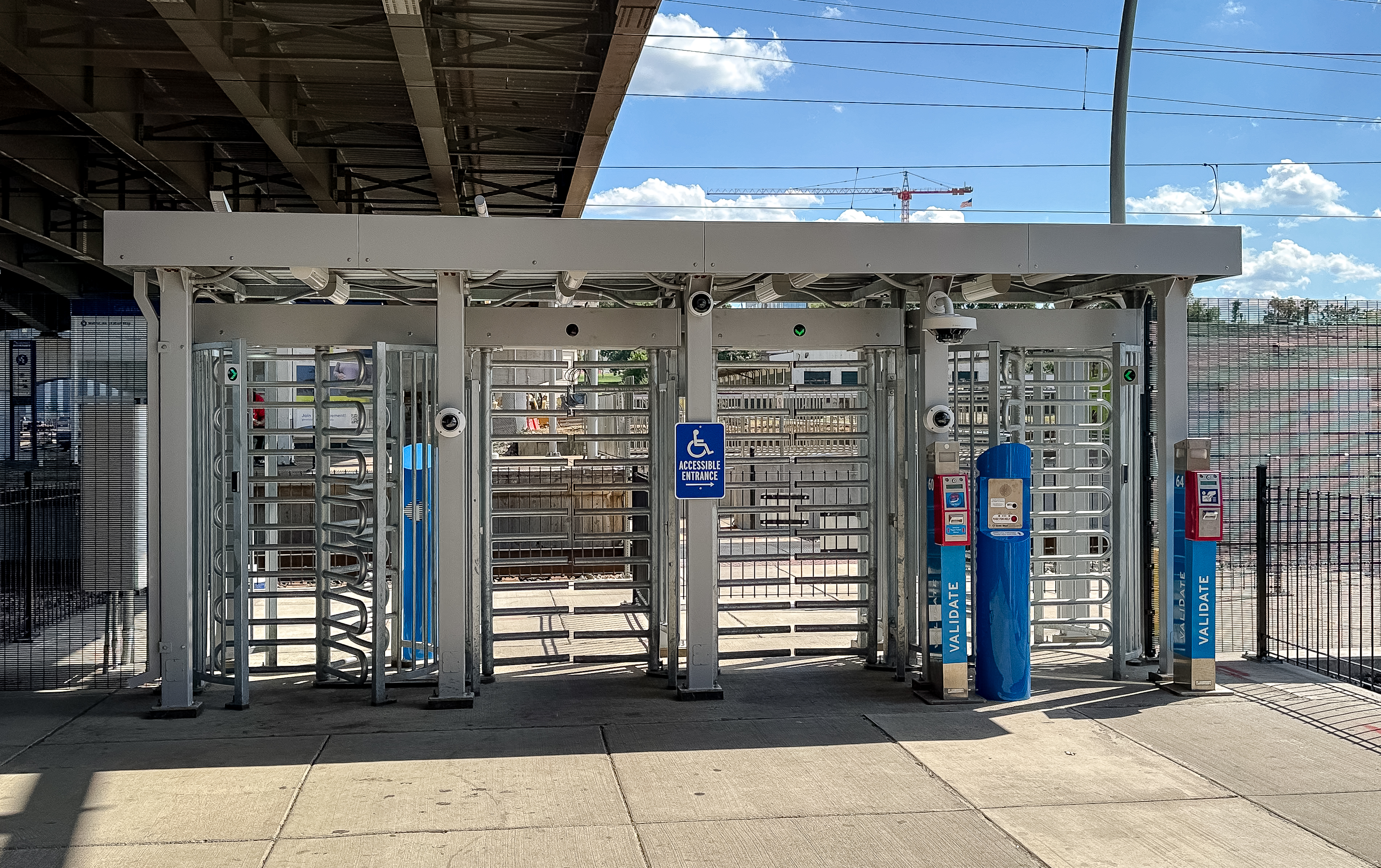
Gates installed as part of the Secure Platform Plan at Grand station

In 2024, Metro Transit began adding turnstiles at all MetroLink stations as part of its $52 million Secure Platform Plan (SPP). Stations will also receive a new fare collection system, more fences, passenger-assist telephones, and more than 1,800 cameras to be monitored at a center opened in November 2022 at Metro's Central Garage.

The SPP will be implemented in three "packages" with full operation expected to begin in 2026. In September 2023, Bi-State awarded a $6.4 million contract to Millstone Weber LLC for the first package covering four Illinois stations. The gates at these first four stations began operating in September 2024. However, due to delays in implementing a new fare collection system, Metro staff will operate the fare gates manually at first. The second package covers seven Missouri stations and is also slated for completion by early 2025. In July 2026, the new turnstiles and fare collection system became fully operational at 26 MetroLink stations. The remaining 12 stations became operational on August 17th.

== Projects in planning ==
=== North-South expansion ===
Green Line project logo

In 2022, Metro proposed a $1.1 billion, 5.6-mile (9.0 km) north-south light rail expansion dubbed the Green Line. Running primarily on Jefferson Avenue, the line would have served about 10 stations between Chippewa Street in South St. Louis and Grand Boulevard in North St. Louis with an estimated daily ridership of 5,000 and $8-9 million in annual operating costs. In 2023, an extension of the Green Line into North St. Louis County was explored with four alternatives that would have continued the line from the Grand/Fairground station along Natural Bridge Avenue to the county line. However, by 2024, County leaders had rejected all four routes primarily due to the unfunded 3-mile (4.8 km) gap between the Grand/Fairground station and the county line along with concerns about federal funding, ridership, right-of-way constraints and other factors.

In September 2025, Metro and St. Louis officials cancelled the Green Line project primarily due to cost concerns. That month's Bi-State Development board meeting saw commissioners vote to update the Program Management Consultant contract to evaluate alternative options for the project, with a focus on bus rapid transit. In that same meeting commissioners approved a study for bus rapid transit in the Jefferson corridor, a project that could cost between $400 and $450 million.

In June 2026, East-West Gateway approved an 11.5-mile (18.5 km) bus rapid transit alignment that features 23 stations and connects to MetroLink at Civic Center in downtown St. Louis. Estimated costs for the line are between $360 million and $590 million with a projected yearly ridership of 1,300,000.

== Previous proposals ==
Many of these services were proposed after the passage of Proposition A in 2010 when Metro Transit released its 30-year plan, Moving Transit Forward.

=== MetroLink ===
Moving Transit Forward identified five potential MetroLink extensions as part of its long-range plan: North-South, Daniel Boone, MetroSouth, MetroNorth, and Madison County. Most of these proposals have never moved beyond the initial study phase because of uncertainties about funding, ridership potential, community support, and other factors.

=== Bus Rapid Transit ===
Moving Transit Forward also identified five potential bus rapid transit lines. Four would have run along highways that connect downtown St. Louis to its suburbs: I-44 to Eureka, I-64 to Chesterfield, I-55 to South County, and I-70 to St. Charles County. A fifth line would have run along Grand Boulevard in St. Louis. As of 2025, Metro and the City of St. Louis are studying a potential bus rapid transit line along Jefferson Avenue in place of the cancelled Green Line light rail project.

=== Commuter rail ===
Initially, two long-distance commuter rail lines were proposed as part of Moving Transit Forward. Both would have run from the Gateway Transportation Center in downtown St. Louis to Alton, Illinois, and the Pacific, Missouri area. Both routes carry existing Amtrak service. Neither has been studied for local commuter rail service.

== See also ==
- List of rail transit systems in the United States
- List of tram and light rail transit systems
- Transportation in St. Louis
