= MetroBus (St. Louis) =

Public bus service for Greater St. Louis, United States

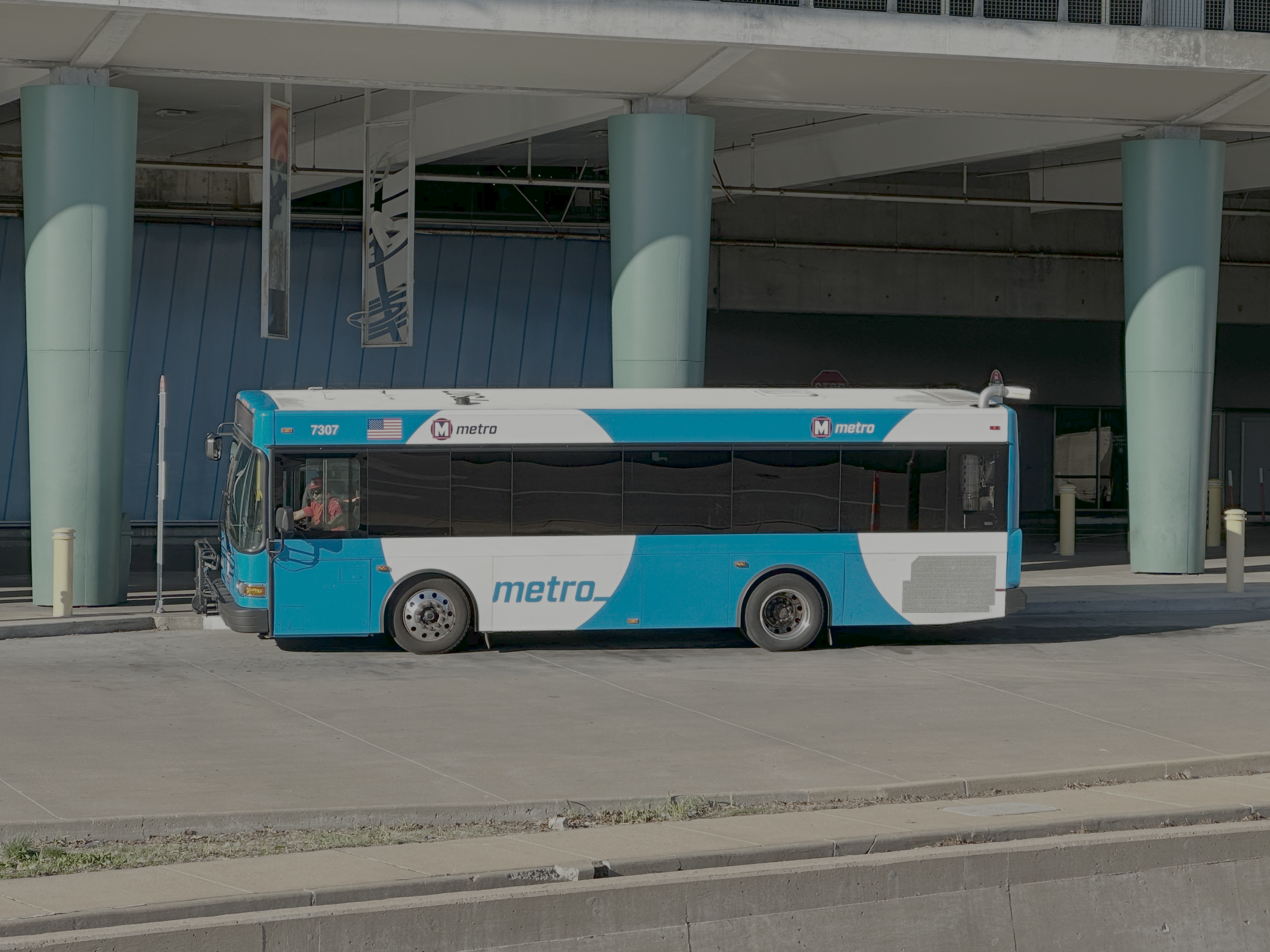
- A MetroBus at the Clayton Transit Center in 2026
- Parent: Bi-State Development Agency
- Founded: 1963; 63 years ago
- Service area: Greater St. Louis, Missouri–Illinois, U.S.
- Service type: Local bus Express bus
- Routes: 58
- Stops: 5,000+
- Hubs: 25 transit centers 23 park and ride lots
- Depots: 3
- Fleet: 276 diesel buses 24 electric buses
- Daily ridership: 41,400 (weekdays, Q2 2026)
- Annual ridership: 11,437,300 (2025)
- Fuel type: Diesel; Electric
- Operator: Metro Transit
- Website: metrostlouis.org/metrobus

MetroBus is a public bus service operated by Metro Transit that serves the Greater St. Louis area. In 2025, the service had an annual ridership of 11,437,300, or about 41,400 per weekday as of the second quarter of 2026.

== Service ==
MetroBus currently operates 58 fixed bus routes in a shared fare system with MetroLink. Of its 58 bus routes, 44 of them operate in St. Louis City and County in Missouri with 14 routes in St. Clair County, Illinois. In September 2019, as part of Metro Reimagined, Metro restructured Missouri bus routes to add increased frequency on busy routes but discontinued six low ridership routes. That same year, Metro also removed or relocated more than 360 of the system's 5,400 bus stops.

In June 2021, Metro introduced the region's first electric buses including 40-foot and 60-foot articulated models. The 60-foot articulated buses are used exclusively on the #70 Grand bus line, the region's busiest.

Beginning with the COVID-19 pandemic in 2020, MetroBus has seen a sharp decline in ridership and it's estimated that full recovery could take several years. In addition, ongoing labor shortages have reduced Metro's ability to offer comprehensive service to its riders. In June 2023, weekend service was reduced on 26 routes and suspended on 4 others. In an effort to recruit more drivers, Bi-State's board signed a contract in August 2023 with Amalgamated Transit Union Local 788, which approved a salary increase for each of the next two fiscal years and a $5,000 signing bonus. However, recruitment remains low and Metro slashed the number of full-time bus driver slots in its 2024 budget by 21%, from 811 to 635.

In 2024, after several successful hiring events, Metro increased frequency on 17 bus routes in Missouri as part of its January service adjustment. At the time of the adjustment, driver ranks had increased to 618, up from 556 in November 2023. By the end of 2024, Metro had increased its operator ranks to 673 allowing it to increase frequency or add service on 35 Missouri and 7 Illinois routes, including the addition of four new routes.

== Routes ==
=== Missouri ===
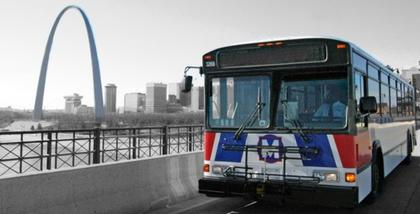
A MetroBus on the Eads Bridge

No.	Name	Notes
1	Gold	Route operates between the Central West End and Mallinckrodt transit centers. This route was originally operated by Washington University as a shuttle service between their medical and Hilltop campuses. Operations were handed over to Metro in 2006.
2	Red	Route operates between the Rock Road and Brentwood I-64 transit centers. Intermediate stops include the Delmar Loop, Skinker and Mallinckrodt transit centers. This route was originally operated by Washington University as a shuttle service between their campuses and other locations. Operations were handed over to Metro in 2006.
4	Natural Bridge	Route operates primarily along Natural Bridge Avenue between the North Hanley and Civic Center transit centers with an intermediate stop at UMSL–South.
8	Shaw-Cherokee	Route operates between the Central West End and Catalan transit centers. Generally follows Taylor, Chouteau, Tower Grove, Shaw, Grand Boulevard, Cherokee, Jefferson, and South Broadway.
9	Oakville	Route operates between the Shrewsbury Transit Center and Telegraph and Baumgartner in Oakville. Generally follows River de Peres Boulevard, Germania/Marceau, Broadway, and Telegraph. Jefferson Baracks is an intermediate destination.
10	Gravois-Lindell	Route operates between the Central West End and Gravois–Hampton transit centers. The northern half of the route generally follows Olive/Lindell to the Civic Center Transit Center while the southern half follows Gravois to Hampton.
11	Chippewa	Route operates between the Civic Center and Shrewsbury transit centers. Generally follows Chouteau, South Jefferson, Chippewa, and Lansdowne.
13	Union	Route operates along Taylor, Lindell, and Union between the Central West End Transit Center and Union and West Florissant in North St. Louis.
16	City Limits	Route operates between the Riverview and Shrewsbury transit centers. Generally follows Jennings Station Road, Skinker/Kienlen, Jamieson Avenue and Lansdowne Avenue.
18	Taylor	Route operates along Taylor, Newstead, and Pope between the Central West End Transit Center and O'Fallon Park.
19	St. Louis Ave	Route operates between the Civic Center and Rock Road transit centers. Generally follows Tucker Boulevard, 13th Street, St. Louis Avenue, and St. Charles Rock Road.
21	Watson Road	Route operates between the Shrewsbury Transit Center and St. Louis Community College–Meramec. Generally follows Watson Road, Kirkwood Road (Lindbergh Boulevard) and Big Bend Boulevard.
30	Arsenal	Route operates between the Civic Center and Shrewsbury transit centers. Generally follows Chouteau, South Broadway, Arsenal, Watson, and Chippewa. Does not service the National Geospatial–Intelligence Agency during snow events.
31	Chouteau	Route operates between the Civic Center Transit Center and the Maplewood Commons shopping center. Generally follows Chouteau and Manchester to Hanley Road. Makes an intermediate stop at the Maplewood–Manchester Transit Center.
32	M.L. King	Route operates between the Civic Center and Rock Road transit centers. Generally follows 14th Street, Olive Street, Tucker Boulevard, Cole Street, Cass Avenue, and Dr. Martin Luther King Drive.
33	Midland	Route operates along Dorsett and Midland roads between the Clayton Transit Center and Westport Plaza.
34	Earth City	Route operates along Interstate 70 and Route 141 (Earth City Expressway) between the North Hanley Transit Center and the Riverport business parks.
35	Rock Road	Route operates along St. Charles Rock Road between the Rock Road Transit Center and DePaul Medical Center.
40	Broadway-Halls Ferry	Route operates between the North County and Civic Center transit centers. Runs primarily along Broadway north of Olive Street and Halls Ferry north of the Riverview Transit Center. In downtown St. Louis, the route is coupled on Locust and Olive streets between 14th Street and Broadway.
41	Lee	Route operates primarily along Riverview Boulevard, Lee Avenue, and 20th Street between the Riverview and Civic Center transit centers. During snow events the route changes to West Florissant Avenue and Union Boulevard.
42	Sarah	Route operates primarily along Sarah Street in North St. Louis between the Central West Transit Center and O'Fallon Park.
49	Lindbergh	Route operates between the North Hanley Transit Center and South County Mall. Generally follows Lindbergh Boulevard and Natural Bridge Avenue.
56	Kirkwood-Webster	Route operates between the Shrewsbury Transit Center and St. Louis Community College–Meramec. Generally follows Big Bend Boulevard, Berry Road, and Lockwood Avenue.
57	Manchester	Route operates primarily along Manchester Road between the Maplewood Transit Center and Wildwood Town Center. Limited service is provided to St. Louis Community College–Wildwood.
58	Chesterfield Valley	Route operates between the Clayton Transit Center and the Chesterfield Valley. Generally follows Interstate 64 with intermediate stops at the Ballas Transit Center, Missouri Baptist Medical Center, and Chesterfield shopping centers.
59	Oakland	Route operates between the Central West End Transit Center and Highland Terrace at St. Mary's Hospital. Generally follows Oakland and Clayton avenues.
60	Shepley-Lilac	Route begins at the Riverview Transit Center and operates primarily along Chambers Road and Lilac Avenue serving destinations in Glasgow Village.
61	Chambers	Route operates between the North Hanley and Riverview transit centers. Generally follows Hanley Road, Airport/Chambers Road, and Bellefontaine Road.
64	Lucas Hunt	Route operates primarily along Lucas-Hunt and Halls Ferry roads between the Rock Road and Riverview transit centers.
70	Grand	Route operates almost entirely along Grand Boulevard between the North Broadway Transit Center and Loughborough Commons. This is Metro's busiest bus route and is operated with 60-foot, battery electric articulated buses.
73	Carondelet	Route operates between the Civic Center Transit Center and South County Mall. Generally follows 12th Street, South Broadway, Virginia and Michigan avenues, and Lemay Ferry Road.
74	Florissant	Route operates primarily along West and North Florissant avenues between the North County and Civic Center transit centers. Limited service is provided to St. Louis Community College–Florissant Valley.
76	North Hanley Shuttle	Route originates at the North County Transit Center. Serves various industrial parks near St. Louis Lambert International Airport and other destinations in Florissant and Hazelwood.
77	Village Square	Route operates primarily along Hanley Road, Dunn Road, Lindbergh Boulevard, and New Halls Ferry Road between the North County and North Hanley transit centers.
78	Bellefontaine	Route operates between the North County and Riverview transit centers. Generally follows New Halls Ferry Road, Parker Road, and Bellefontaine Road and serves Christian Hospital Northeast and the National Personnel Records Center.
79	Ferguson-Clayton	Route operates between the Clayton and North County transit centers, primarily on Hanley Road, Florissant Road, Dunn Road, and Pershall Road. Makes an intermediate stop at the North Hanley Transit Center.
90	Hampton	Route operates primarily on Goodfellow Boulevard and DeBaliviere Avenue in North St. Louis and Hampton Avenue and Germania/Marceau avenues In South St. Louis. This route also serves attractions in Forest Park.
91	Olive	Route operates along Olive Boulevard between the Delmar Transit Center and Chesterfield Village.
94	Page	Route operates along Page between the Civic Center Transit Center and Westport Plaza. Intermediate stops include the Wellston Transit Center.
95	Kingshighway	Route operates primarily along Kingshighway Boulevard between the North Broadway and Gravois–Hampton transit centers. Intermediate stops include the Central West End Transit Center and Barnes-Jewish Hospital.
97	Delmar	Route operates primarily along Delmar Boulevard between the Civic Center and Clayton transit centers with an intermediate stop at the Delmar Loop Transit Center.
98	Ballas-North Hanley	Route operates between the North Hanley and Ballas transit centers. Generally follows New Ballas Road where it serves both Mercy and Missouri Baptist medical centers and then continues along interstates 270 and 70.
100	Hazelwood	Route operates between the North Hanley Transit Center and several business and industrial parks around Hazelwood.

=== Illinois ===
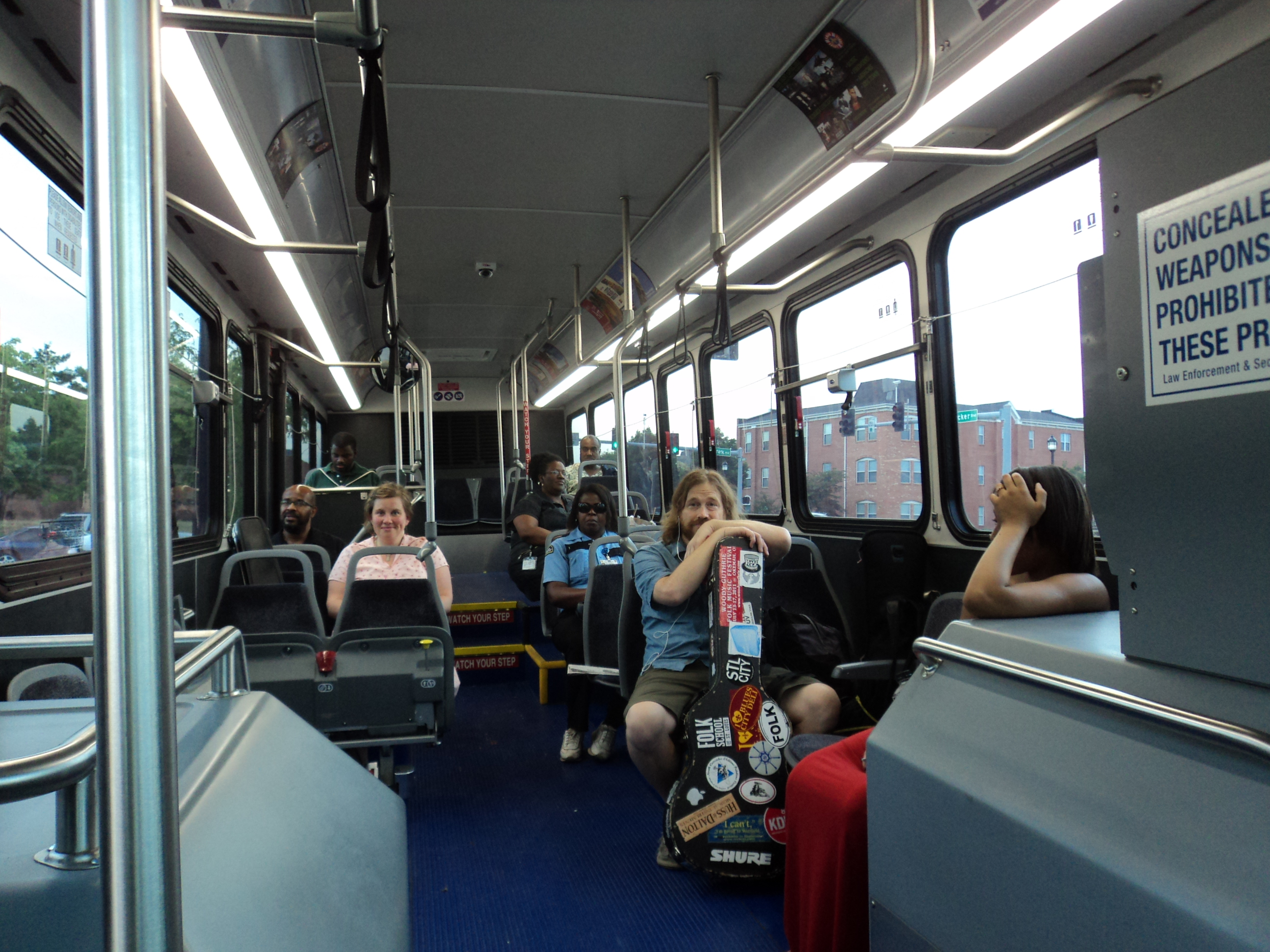
Interior of a MetroBus in 2012

No.	Name	Notes
1	Main Street-State Street	Route operates primarily along State and Main streets between the 5th & Missouri and Belleville transit centers. Intermediate stops include the Fairview Heights Transit Center and downtown Belleville.
2	Cahokia Heights	Route operates between the 5th & Missouri Transit Center and Cahokia Heights. Generally follows Mississippi Avenue, Falling Springs Road, and Camp Jackson Road. Intermediate stops include the St. Louis Downtown Airport and Cahokia High School.
3	Sauget-Water Street	Route operates primarily along Mississippi Avenue and Water Street between the 5th & Missouri Transit Center and Prairie Du Pont. Intermediate stops include Sauget Business Park.
4	19th & Central	Route operates from the 5th & Missouri Transit Center to 19th and Wilford. Generally follows Broadway, Bond Avenue, 19th Street, Wilford Avenue, and 17th Street.
5	Missouri Avenue-ML King	Route operates from the 5th & Missouri Transit Center and serves locations in central East St. Louis. Generally follows Missouri and St. Louis avenues.
6	Rosemont	Route operates between the Emerson Park and Fairview Heights transit centers. Intermediate stops include the Jackie Joyner-Kersee Center and Washington Park MetroLink stations.
8	Alta Sita	Route operates between the Emerson Park Transit Center and Cahokia Village. Generally follows 25th Street, Bond Avenue, and Route 157.
9	Washington Park	Route operates between the Emerson Park and Washington Park transit centers. Intermediate stops include the Jackie Joyner-Kersee Center MetroLink station.
12	O'Fallon-Fairview Heights	Route operates between the Fairview Heights and Shiloh-Scott transit centers. Serves various locations in O'Fallon including St. Clair Square.
13	Caseyville	Route operates between the Fairview Heights Transit Center and Collinsville. Generally follows Main Street and Morrison Avenue.
14	Memorial Hospital-Westfield Plaza	Route operates between the Memorial Hospital Transit Center and 74th Street at Westchester. Intermediate stops include Memorial Hospital, Country Club Plaza, and Westfield Plaza.
15	Belleville-O'Fallon	Route operates between the Belleville Transit Center and downtown O'Fallon. Intermediate stops include Green Mount Crossing and Memorial Hospital.
16	St. Clair Square	Route operates between the College Transit Center and downtown Collinsville. Generally follows Route 159 with intermediate stops at the Belleville and Swansea transit centers and St. Clair Square.
23	Belleville-College	Route operates between the Belleville and College transit centers. Primarily along State Route 161.

== Fares ==
MetroBus operates in a shared fare system with MetroLink. When boarding, riders with valid passes present them to the operator and those without are able to pay exact change into the onboard fare box.

Metro also accepts some fares from Madison County Transit (MCT) on its services. MCT's 2-hour regional pass is accepted as full fare on MetroBus and its senior/ADA passes qualify as reduced fare on Metro services. In addition, Metro's 2-hour pass/transfer is valid for a single bus trip on MCT with no additional charge.

Residents called to jury duty in Metro's service area may travel on MetroBus free of charge.

MetroBus Fare Structure
Metro Fare Type	Mode	Current Fare
Cash Base Fare	Bus	$1.00
Cash (Reduced Fare)*	Bus	$0.50
2-Hour Pass/Transfer^{†}	Bus/Rail	$3.00
2-Hour Pass/Transfer (Reduced Fare)*^{†}	Bus/Rail	$1.50
2-Hour Pass (from Lambert Airport)^{†}	Bus/Rail	$4.00
(10) 2-Hour Passes^{†}	Bus/Rail	$30.00
One-Day Adventure Pass	Bus/Rail	$5.00
Weekly Pass	Bus/Rail	$27.00
Monthly Pass	Bus/Rail	$78.00
Monthly Pass (Reduced Fare)*	Bus/Rail	$39.00
Combo Pass	Bus/Rail	$98.00
University Semester Pass	Bus/Rail	$175.00
* Reduced fares require a Metro reduced fare permit † Two-hour passes can only be purchased as a mobile fare option on the Transit app

== Fleet ==
Metro Transit operates 308 vehicles for MetroBus, including 276 35- and 40-foot low-emission, low-floor diesel buses made by Gillig; 10 electric 40-foot Gillig buses; and 14 electric 60-foot articulated New Flyer XE60 buses. Electric buses are charged overnight at the Brentwood and DeBaliviere garages, while in-service charging is at the North Broadway Transit Center.

All MetroBus vehicles are equipped with an accessible lift or ramp and include priority seating. Additionally, each vehicle is equipped with a two-bike bike rack, available on a first-come, first-served basis.

== Facilities ==
=== Transit centers ===
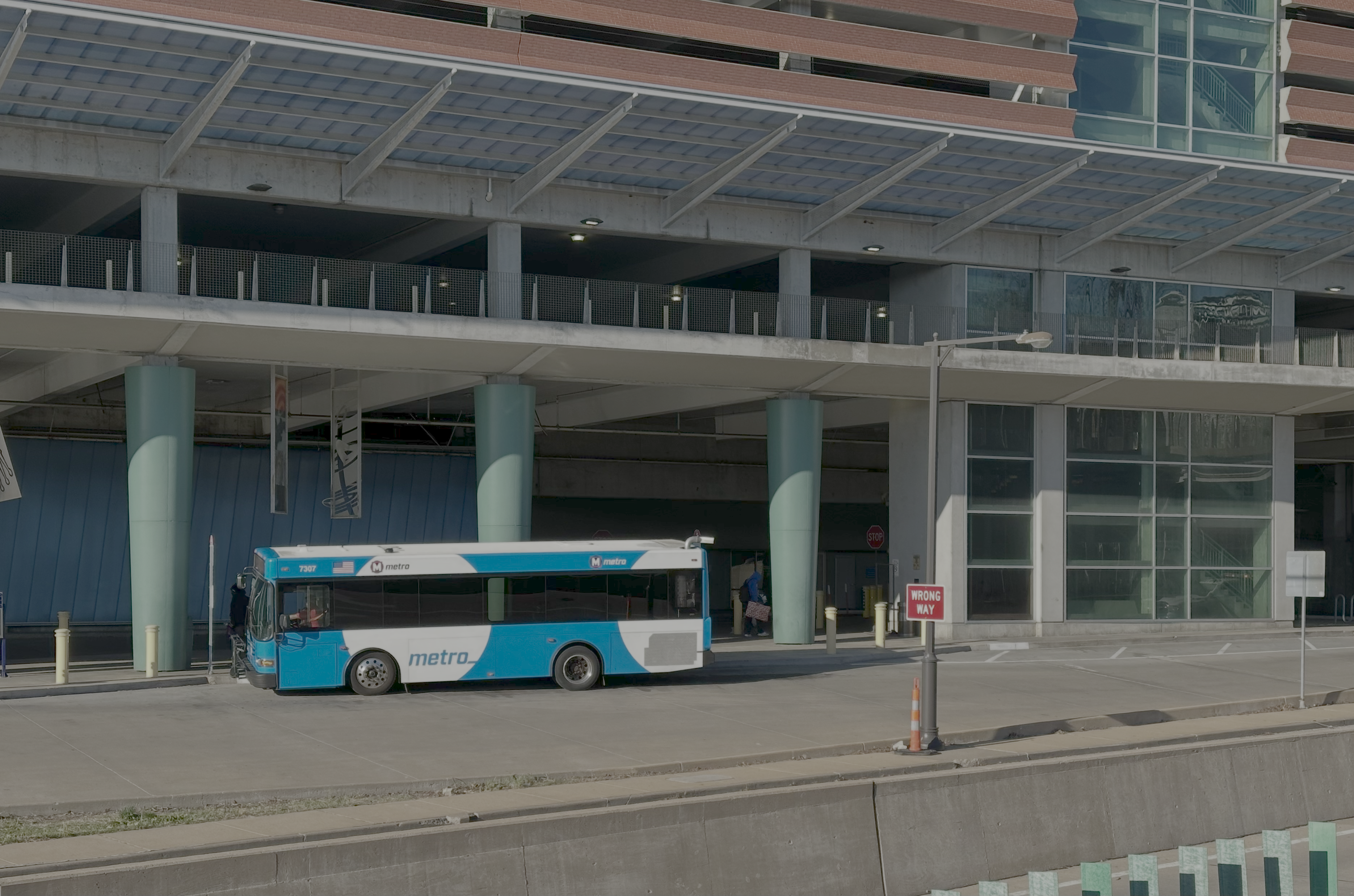
A MetroBus at the Clayton Transit Center in 2026

MetroBus serves a total of 25 transit centers with 15 of them located in Missouri and 10 of them located in Illinois. 19 of them have direct connections with MetroLink.

==== Missouri ====
- Ballas Transit Center
- Brentwood Transit Center
- Catalan Loop Transit Center
- Central West End Transit Center
- Civic Center Transit Center
- Clayton Transit Center
- Delmar Transit Center
- Hampton–Gravois Transit Center
- Maplewood Transit Center
- North Broadway Transit Center
- North County Transit Center
- North Hanley Transit Center
- Riverview Transit Center
- Rock Road Transit Center
- Shrewsbury Transit Center

==== Illinois ====
- 5th & Missouri Transit Center
- Belleville Transit Center
- College Transit Center
- Emerson Park Transit Center
- Fairview Heights Transit Center
- Jackie Joyner Kersee Transit Center
- Memorial Hospital Transit Center
- Shiloh–Scott Transit Center
- Swansea Transit Center
- Washington Park Transit Center

=== Other connections ===
At the Civic Center Transit Center, MetroBus passengers can connect with Amtrak, Greyhound and other national services at the neighboring Gateway Transportation Center. MetroBus also connects with Madison County Transit (MCT) bus routes at various stations and transit centers in the core St. Louis area including Civic Center, 8th & Pine, Convention Center and the Emerson Park Transit Center.

=== Garages ===
Metro Transit operates three garages for MetroBus in the Greater St. Louis region:

- Brentwood Garage
- DeBaliviere Garage
- Illinois Garage

== See also ==
- Bi-State Development Agency
- Madison County Transit
- Metro Call-A-Ride
- MetroLink
