= Casino Queen =

Casino in East St. Louis, Illinois, United States

DraftKings at Casino Queen

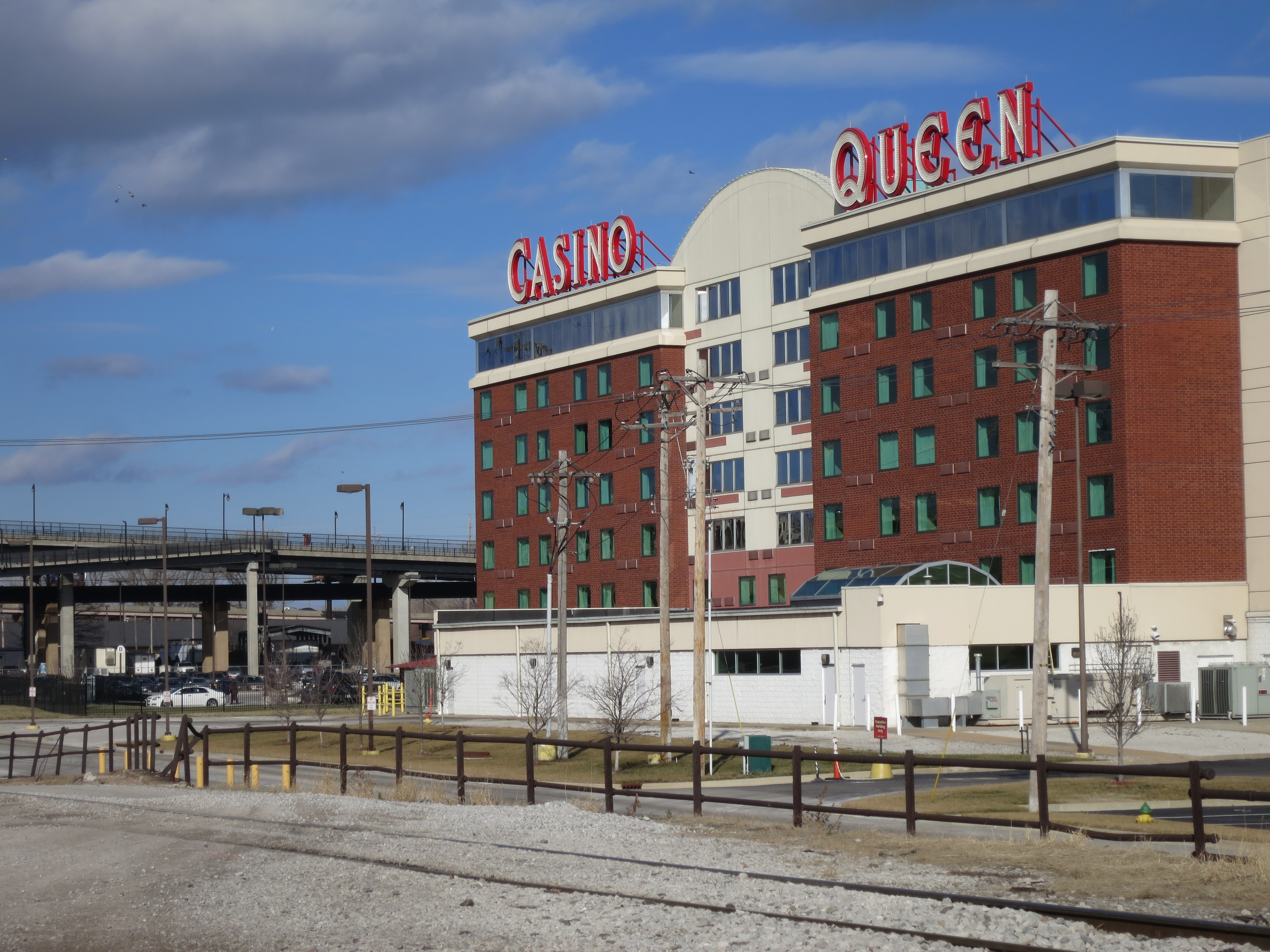
- Casino Queen hotel tower

- Location within Greater St. Louis
- Interactive map of DraftKings at Casino Queen
- Location: East St. Louis, Illinois; 38°37′33″N 90°10′34″W
- Opened: June 23, 1993
- No. of rooms: 157
- Gaming space: 38,000 sq ft (3,500 m^{2})
- Casino type: Riverboat
- Owner: Gaming and Leisure Properties
- Operating license holder: Bally's Corporation
- Previous names: Casino Queen
- Renovated in: 2007, 2022
- Public transit access: Blue Red at East Riverfront
- Website: casinoqueen.com

DraftKings at Casino Queen is a casino located near the Mississippi River in East St. Louis, Illinois, just across the river from St. Louis. It is owned by Gaming and Leisure Properties and operated by Bally's Corporation.

It is still nominally a riverboat casino, but moved onto land in 2007. The gaming floor floats on a basin filled with 340,000 gallons of water, but the rest of the property's amenities are built on dry land.

== History ==
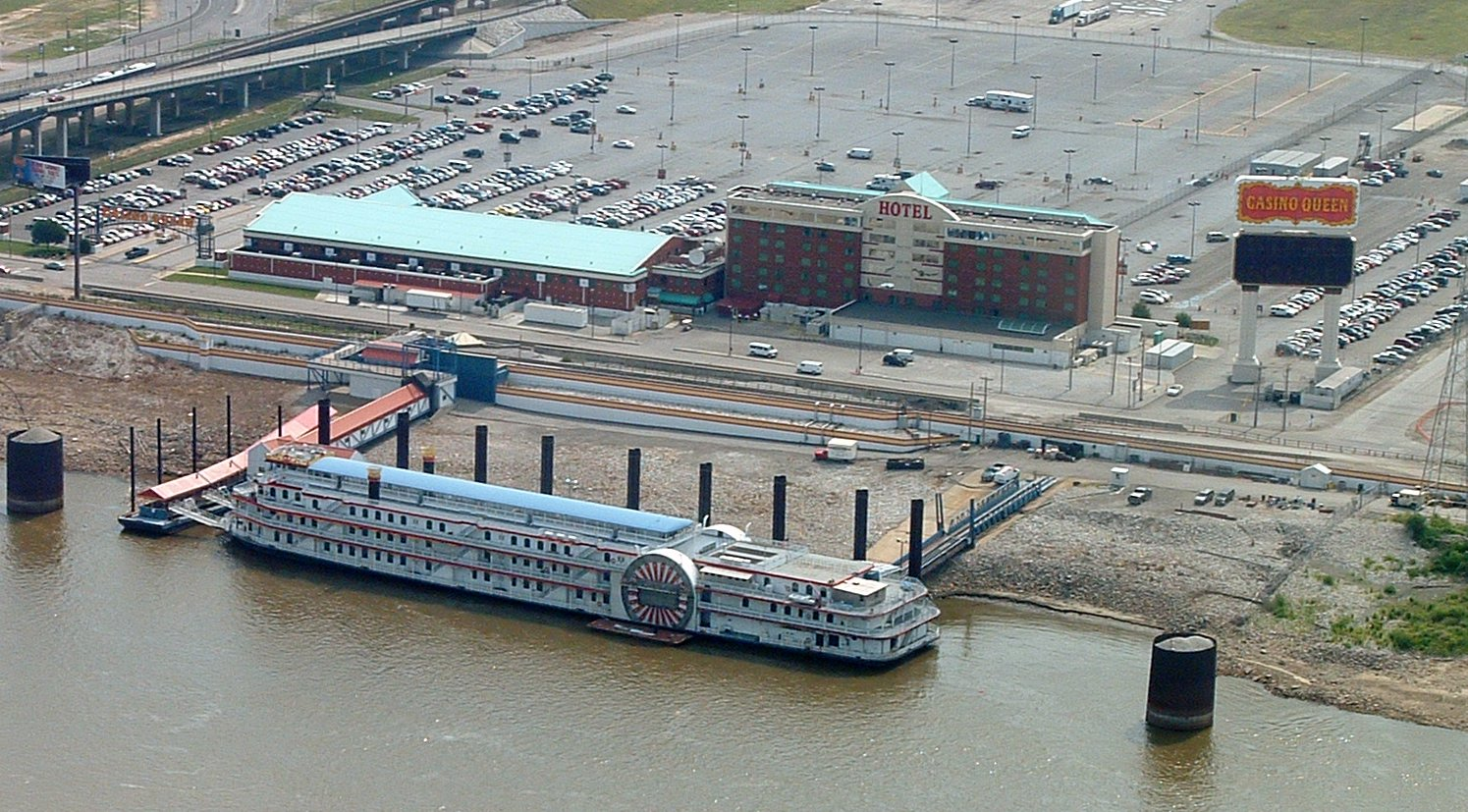
The Casino Queen in 2006 with the White Star One riverboat in the foreground and the hotel tower in the background

Illinois enacted a riverboat casino law in 1990 authorizing licenses for ten casinos to open around the state. One of the licenses was guaranteed to East St. Louis, in an effort to help the financially troubled city. The group that would ultimately open the Casino Queen, led by real estate developer Bill Koman, submitted its proposal to the Illinois Gaming Board in January 1992. With no other proposals before the board, Koman's group was awarded the license in May 1992.

The Casino Queen opened on June 23, 1993. It was viewed positively by most city officials and residents, as the struggling city desperately needed both a revenue source and employment opportunities for its residents. Casino Queen originally operated on a boat called the White Star One.

Construction of a hotel began in 1998. The 157-room hotel, built at a cost of $15 million, opened in January 2000.

Changed regulations led to the casino to be moved inland in 2007, but the gaming floor would still be required to float on water. To meet the requirements, the casino building has a basin filled with 340,000 US gallons (1,300,000 L; 280,000 imp gal) of water on which the gaming floor was placed. The move inland also allowed the casino to add 10,000 additional square feet of gaming space. In 2014, the White Star One was auctioned off and sold for $600,000. Casino Queen has generated over $160 million for the city of East St. Louis between 1993 and 2009.

In 2012, Koman and his partners sold the Casino Queen for $170 million to a newly formed employee stock ownership plan (ESOP), which would steer the casino's profits into the retirement accounts of participating employees. In 2014, to pay down debt taken on to finance the purchase, the ESOP sold the real estate of the Casino Queen to Gaming and Leisure Properties for $140 million, leasing it back for $14 million per year.

In 2020, the casino struck a deal with sports betting provider DraftKings to rebrand the property as DraftKings at Casino Queen. As part of the rebranding, the property will undergo a $10 million renovation that will replace the property's current restaurants and buffet with a full sportsbook, a new all-day restaurant, and a food court with three new quick-service options. The casino will also be integrated into DraftKings' mobile betting app, and also reached an agreement with Fairmount Park Racetrack in nearby Collinsville to operate slots and table games on their property, although sports betting competitor FanDuel has the track's sports-betting license.

In 2025, the casino's parent company merged with Bally's Corporation.

== Property information ==
The casino includes both 1,100 slots and 34 table games in its 38,000 square feet of gaming space. Per Illinois law and unlike neighboring Missouri casinos, it is not open 24 hours a day.

Dining options include: the Bridgeway restaurant, the 3 Woks Noodle Bar restaurant, a That Chickn' Place chicken stand, QBar and Front Street Coffee.

Both a 157-room hotel and a 133-space RV Park are located on the Casino Queen property.

The East Riverfront station of the MetroLink light rail system is located directly next to the casino property.

== See also ==
- List of casinos in Illinois
