= James E. Williams (disambiguation) =

James E. Williams (1930–1999) was an American sailor awarded the Medal of Honor, as well as a law enforcement officer.

James E. Williams may also refer to:

- James E. Williams (Atlanta mayor) (1826–1900), American politician, mayor of Atlanta, Georgia
- James E. Williams (East St. Louis mayor) (1921–1983), American attorney, teacher and first African-American mayor of East St. Louis, Illinois
- USS James E. Williams, a United States Navy destroyer named after the Medal of Honor recipient
