= William E. Mason (East St. Louis mayor) =

American politician

Mayor of East Saint Louis
- In office 1975–1979
- Preceded by: James E. Williams
- Succeeded by: Carl E. Officer

Personal details
- Born: 1933 or 1934 (age 91–92)
- Education: PhD Saint Louis University

William E. Mason is an American politician who was elected as the second African-American mayor of East Saint Louis, Illinois, then the largest city in St. Clair County, Illinois.

Mason served as superintendent of the East Saint Louis school district. On April 1, 1975, Mason defeated the incumbent mayor of East Saint Louis, James E. Williams, one of the few African-American mayors in the country. Mason won by a margin of 6,457 votes to 5,600 in an election marked by low voter turnout. The election was marred by allegations of election fraud and ballot-stuffing. Mason assumed control with more power than previous mayors due to a change to the aldermanic form of government replacing the previous five-member commission model.

Mason's term marked a return to patronage politics with only one of eighteen council members belonging to the prior mayor's independent status with the other seventeen all part of the Democratic political machine. His term began contentiously with Mason dismissing 20 supporters of former Mayor Williams. When a block of alderman passed a resolution seeking to strip him of appointive powers, he subsequently vetoed the resolution. During his term, Mason was successful in soliciting $54 million in federal funds and reducing crime by 21% but was unable to improve on the 30% unemployment rate and halt the declining population. He also left the city in a deep fiscal hole with $20 million in debt, a $1 million fiscal deficit, $3 million in past due loans, and $5 million in unpaid bills. In 1979, he was defeated by a 3 to 1 margin in the Democratic primary by Carl E. Officer. In 1983, he unsuccessfully ran again for mayor in the Democratic primary against Officer.

Preceded by James E. Williams	Mayor of East Saint Louis; 1975–1979	Succeeded by Carl E. Officer
