= Metro Call-A-Ride =

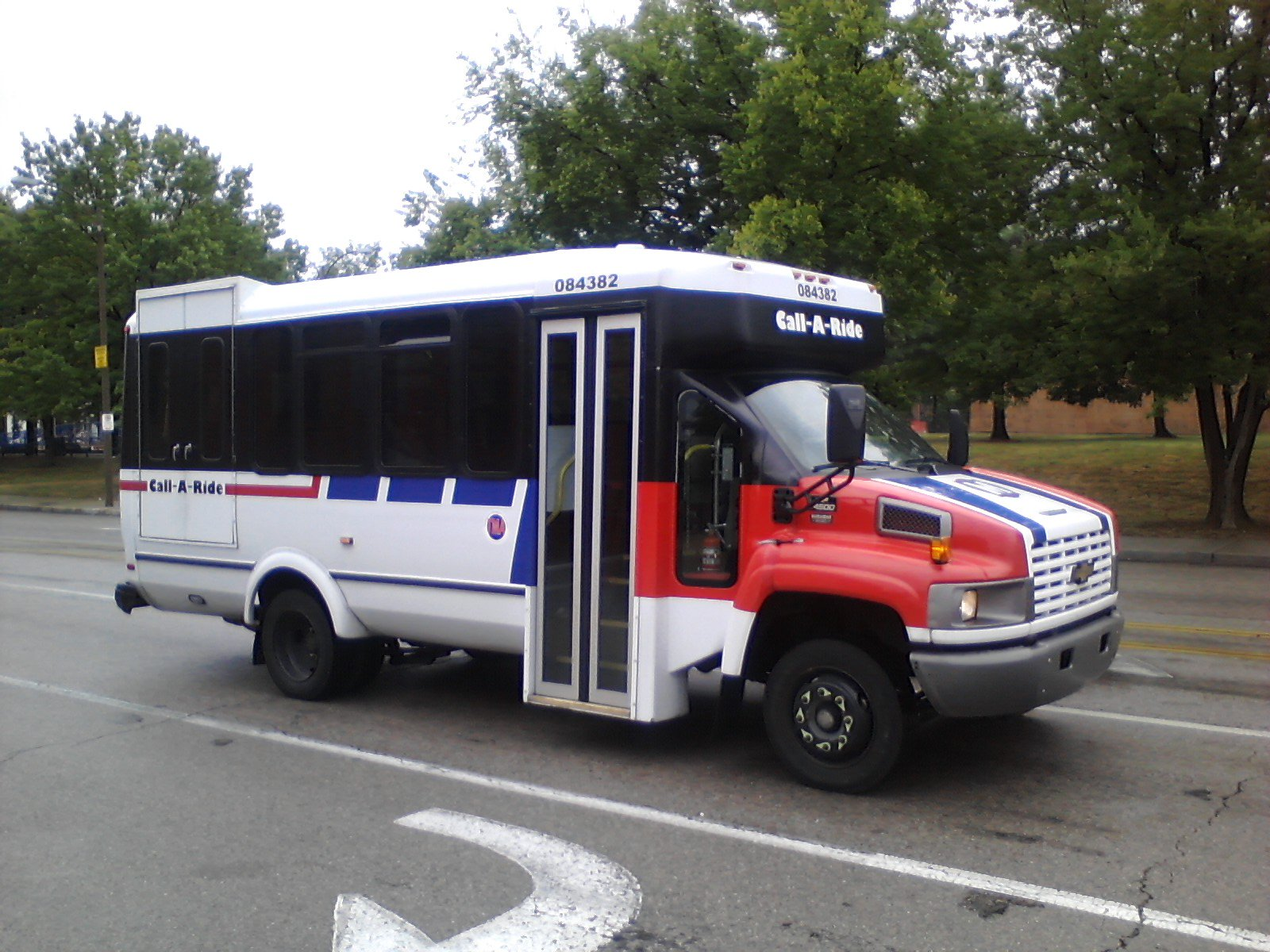
- A Metro Call-A-Ride van in 2011
- Parent: Bi-State Development Agency
- Founded: 1987; 39 years ago
- Service area: City of St. Louis; St. Louis County
- Service type: Paratransit
- Fleet: 123 vans
- Daily ridership: 1,400 (weekdays, Q3 2025)
- Annual ridership: 278,900 (2024)
- Fuel type: Diesel
- Operator: Metro Transit
- Website: metrostlouis.org/metrocallaride

Metro Call-A-Ride is a paratransit service operated by Metro Transit that serves parts of Greater St. Louis. In 2024, the service had an annual ridership of 278,900, or about 1,400 per weekday as of the third quarter of 2025.

== Service ==
Metro Call-A-Ride serves passengers in the city of St. Louis and St. Louis County who have limited access to MetroBus or MetroLink and/or disabled residents who are unable to use those services. Call-A-Ride does not travel on fixed routes like MetroBus and provides service within 3/4 mile of a MetroBus or MetroLink station only when buses and trains are in service.

In April 2023, in response to ongoing operator shortages, Metro announced that it would reduce its service area for Call-A-Ride, primarily in southwest and far north St. Louis County. These reductions in service have led to significant criticism for the transit agency.

During a January 15th, 2024 service adjustment, Metro announced it had increased Call-A-Ride operator ranks to 124, up from 102 in November 2023 but still below the 201 budgeted. Despite the increase in drivers, Metro must reduce missed trips due to the lack of drivers before increasing the Call-A-Ride service area. By the fall of 2024, Call-A-Ride had reduced trip denial rates from 42.5% to less than 1% and increased its operator ranks to 186.

In 2025, Metro launched new scheduling software that includes a smartphone app and web-based portal for managing trips and real-time vehicle tracking updates.

== Fleet ==
Metro's Call-A-Ride fleet is made up of 123 vans equipped with an accessible lift or ramp and priority seating.

=== Roster ===
Call-A-Ride roster as of fiscal year 2022:

Fleet number(s)	Quantity	Year built	Manufacturer	Model	Engine	Transmission
4330-4379	21	2009	ElDorado	Aerotech	GMC Duramax 6.6L	
4401-4425	17	2008	ElDorado	Aerotech	GMC Duramax 6.6L	
4430-4453	19	2008	ElDorado	Aerotech CNG	Cummins Westport ISL G	GM 4-Speed Automatic
4501-4537	37	2015	Champion Defender	Freightliner M2 35	Cummins ISL9	Allison 2500 PTS
4601-4617	17	2016	Champion Defender	Freightliner M2 35	Cummins ISL9	Allison 2500 PTS
4701-4722	22	2019	Arboc	SOI	Ford 3.7L	
4801-4820	20	2020	Arboc	SOI	Ford 3.7L	

== See also ==
- Bi-State Development Agency
- MetroBus
- MetroLink
- List of Metro Transit (St. Louis) yards and depots
