= Emerson Park station (MetroLink) =

Light rail station in St. Clair County, Illinois, US

Emerson Park

General information
- Location: 929 North 15th Street; East St. Louis, Illinois
- Coordinates: 38°37′44″N 90°08′13″W
- Owner: Bi-State Development
- Operator: Metro Transit
- Platforms: 1 island platform
- Tracks: 2
- Bus stands: 10
- Connections: MetroBus Illinois: 06, 08, 09; Madison County Transit: 05, 18, 20X

Construction
- Structure type: At-grade
- Parking: 841 spaces
- Cycle facilities: Rack
- Accessible: Yes

History
- Opened: May 5, 2001

Passengers
- 2018: 1,094 daily
- Rank: 15 out of 38

Services
Preceding station	MetroLink	Following station
5th & Missouri toward Shrewsbury–Lansdowne I-44	Blue Line	JJK Center toward Fairview Heights
5th & Missouri toward Lambert Airport Terminal 1	Red Line	JJK Center toward Shiloh–Scott
Location

Emerson Park station is a light rail station on the Red and Blue lines of the St. Louis MetroLink system. This at-grade station is located near 15th Street and Bowman Avenue in East St. Louis, Illinois. It also serves as a transfer for MetroBus and Madison County Transit and features 841 park and ride spaces.

There is a pedestrian bridge across nearby Interstate 64 that connects this station to other parts of East St. Louis.

== History ==
In 2014, a transit-oriented development called Jazz at Walter Circle opened adjacent to this station. The 74-unit mixed-use apartment building offers more than 100,000 square feet of floor space and includes a full-service grocery store.

In 2021, the area between the bus bays and MetroLink entrance was updated into a space with a vibrant-colored jazz theme, spaces to gather, greenery, shaded seating, canopies, and a mural inspired by design concepts that were submitted by East St. Louis High School students. The second "Transit Stop Transformation" project to be completed, it was unveiled on August 23, 2021 by Citizens for Modern Transit, AARP in St. Louis, and Metro Transit in partnership with several local agencies.

In 2022, the St. Clair County Transit District awarded a $13.5 million contract to construct a new public safety center at this station. The new center opened on July 11, 2024 and houses space for St. Clair County sheriff’s deputies, a backup Metro Transit control center, the St. Clair County CENCOM West 9-1-1 Emergency Dispatch Center and public restrooms for riders.

== Station layout ==
The island platform is accessed via a single ramp on its west end that connects to the bus boarding area and Bowman Avenue. There is a pocket track immediately east of the station allowing some trains to change direction while others continue through the station.

== Bus connections ==
The following MetroBus and regional Madison County Transit lines serve Emerson Park station:

=== MetroBus ===
- 06 Rosemont
- 08 Alta Sita
- 09 Washington Park

=== Madison County Transit ===
- 05 Tri-City Regional
- 18 Collinsville Regional
- 20X Gateway Commerce Center Express
