= East Riverfront station =

Light rail station in St. Clair County, Illinois, US

East Riverfront
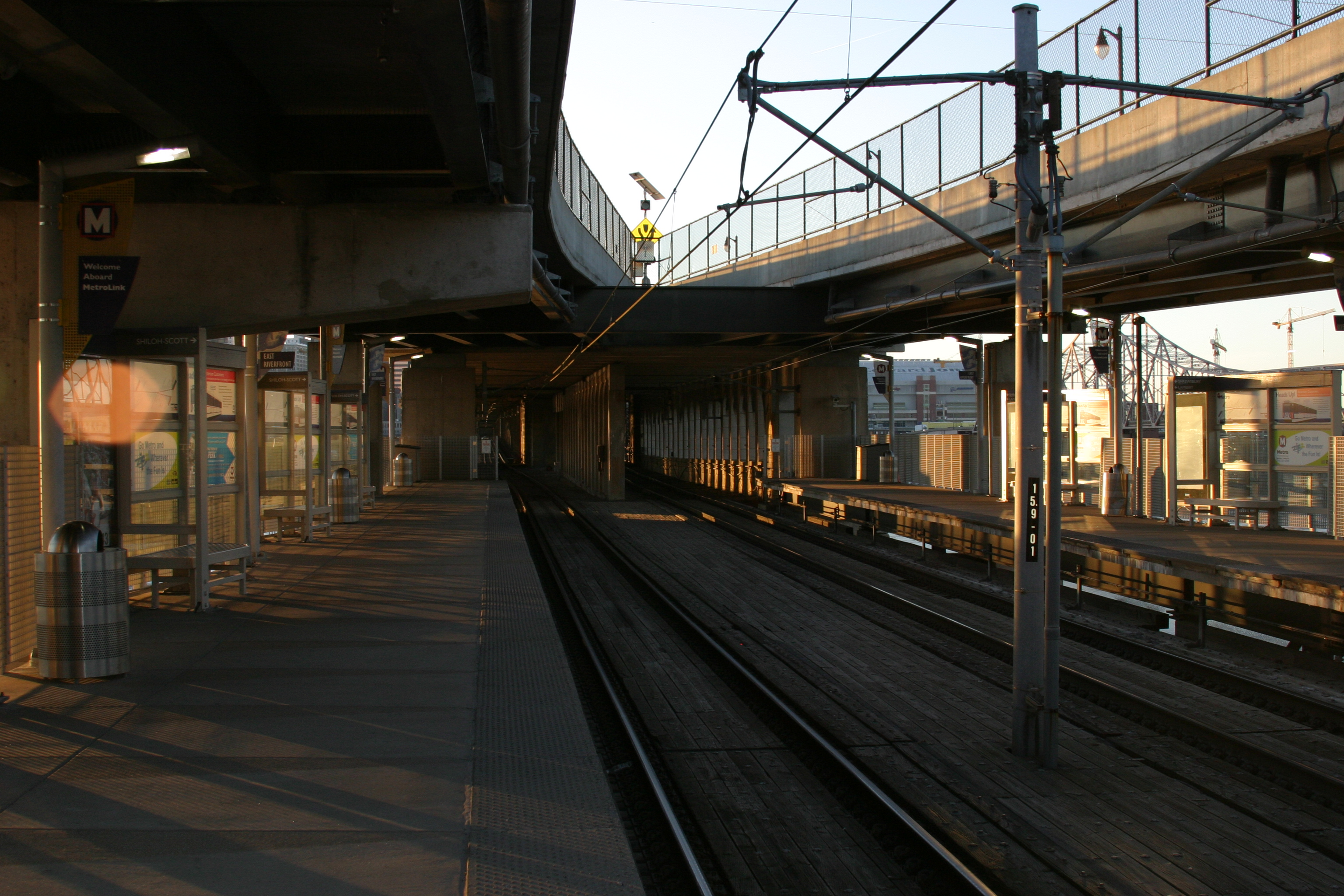
- East Riverfront station platform

General information
- Location: 100 South Front Street; East St. Louis, Illinois
- Coordinates: 38.628507°N 90.174765°W
- Owner: Bi-State Development
- Operator: Metro Transit
- Platforms: 2 side platforms
- Tracks: 2

Construction
- Structure type: Elevated
- Parking: 295 spaces
- Accessible: Yes

History
- Opened: May 14, 1994
- Rebuilt: 2023

Passengers
- 2018: 567 daily
- Rank: 25 out of 38

Services
Preceding station	MetroLink	Following station
Laclede's Landing toward Shrewsbury–Lansdowne I-44	Blue Line	5th & Missouri toward Fairview Heights
Laclede's Landing toward Lambert Airport Terminal 1	Red Line	5th & Missouri toward Shiloh–Scott
Location

East Riverfront is a light rail station on the Red and Blue lines of the St. Louis MetroLink system. This elevated station was built on a reconstructed viaduct east of the historic Eads Bridge near the East St. Louis, Illinois riverfront.

The station is popular with Illinois commuters and has a park and ride lot with 295 spaces.

== History ==
East Riverfront is the westernmost station in Illinois, located on the lower deck of the Eads Bridge before crossing the Mississippi River into Missouri. It opened on May 14, 1994 as an infill station on the original MetroLink alignment.

In January 2023, Metro Transit temporarily closed the East Riverfront station to accommodate platform rehabilitation and staircase replacement with the station reopening on May 29, 2023.

== Station layout ==
The platforms are accessed from Front Street via a set of stairs and an elevator on either side of the Eads Bridge. The eastbound platform can also be accessed via a ramp from the upper-level pedestrian walkway on the south edge of the bridge.

== Notable places nearby ==
- Casino Queen
- Malcolm W. Martin Memorial Park
