= Jackie Joyner-Kersee Center station =

Light rail station in St. Clair County, Illinois, US

Jackie Joyner-Kersee Ctr.

General information
- Other names: JJK Center
- Location: 1003 North 25th Street; East St. Louis, Illinois
- Coordinates: 38°37′24″N 90°07′28″W
- Owner: Bi-State Development
- Operator: Metro Transit
- Platforms: 1 island platform
- Tracks: 2
- Bus stands: 4
- Connections: MetroBus Illinois: 06, 09

Construction
- Structure type: At-grade
- Cycle facilities: Rack
- Accessible: Yes

History
- Opened: May 5, 2001

Passengers
- 2018: 462 daily
- Rank: 32 out of 38

Services
Preceding station	MetroLink	Following station
Emerson Park toward Shrewsbury–Lansdowne I-44	Blue Line	Washington Park toward Fairview Heights
Emerson Park toward Lambert Airport Terminal 1	Red Line	Washington Park toward Shiloh–Scott
Location

Jackie Joyner-Kersee Center station (also known as JJK Center) is a light rail station on the Red and Blue lines of the St. Louis MetroLink system. This at-grade station is adjacent to the Jackie Joyner-Kersee Youth Center and just north of Interstate 64's exit 4B (25th Street) in East St. Louis, Illinois.

This station has no park and ride lot but does feature a kiss and ride turnaround.

== Station layout ==
The island platform is accessed via a single ramp on its west end that connects to the bus boarding area. There is also a set of stairs from the bus loop down an embankment to 25th Street.

== Bus connections ==
The following MetroBus lines serve Jackie Joyner-Kersee Center station:

- 06 Rosemont
- 09 Washington Park

== Notable places nearby ==
- Jones Park
