= Washington Park station (MetroLink) =

Light rail station in St. Clair County, Illinois, US

Washington Park

General information
- Location: 909 North 54th Street; East St. Louis, Illinois
- Coordinates: 38.613685°N 90.095224°W
- Owner: Bi-State Development Agency
- Operator: Metro Transit
- Platforms: 1 island platform
- Tracks: 2
- Bus stands: 3
- Connections: MetroBus Illinois: 06, 09

Construction
- Structure type: At-grade
- Parking: 706 spaces
- Cycle facilities: Rack
- Accessible: Yes

History
- Opened: May 5, 2001

Passengers
- 2018: 599 daily
- Rank: 24 out of 38

Services
Preceding station	MetroLink	Following station
JJK Center toward Shrewsbury–Lansdowne I-44	Blue Line	Fairview Heights Terminus
JJK Center toward Lambert Airport Terminal 1	Red Line	Fairview Heights toward Shiloh–Scott
Location

Washington Park station is a light rail station on the Red and Blue lines of the St. Louis MetroLink system. This at-grade station is located on the city limit line between East St. Louis, Illinois and Washington Park, Illinois.

It primarily serves Illinois commuters via a MetroBus transfer and a park and ride lot with 706 spaces. The park and ride lot is accessed from both North Kings Highway and St. Clair Avenue.

== Station layout ==
The island platform is accessed via a ramp that leads to the bus transfer and parking lot to the north of the tracks and North 53rd Street to the south of the tracks.

== Bus connections ==
The following MetroBus lines serve Washington Park station:

- 06 Rosemont
- 09 Washington Park

== Notable places nearby ==
- East St. Louis Senior High School
- Frank Holten State Park
