= Malcolm W. Martin Memorial Park =

Gateway Geyser venue

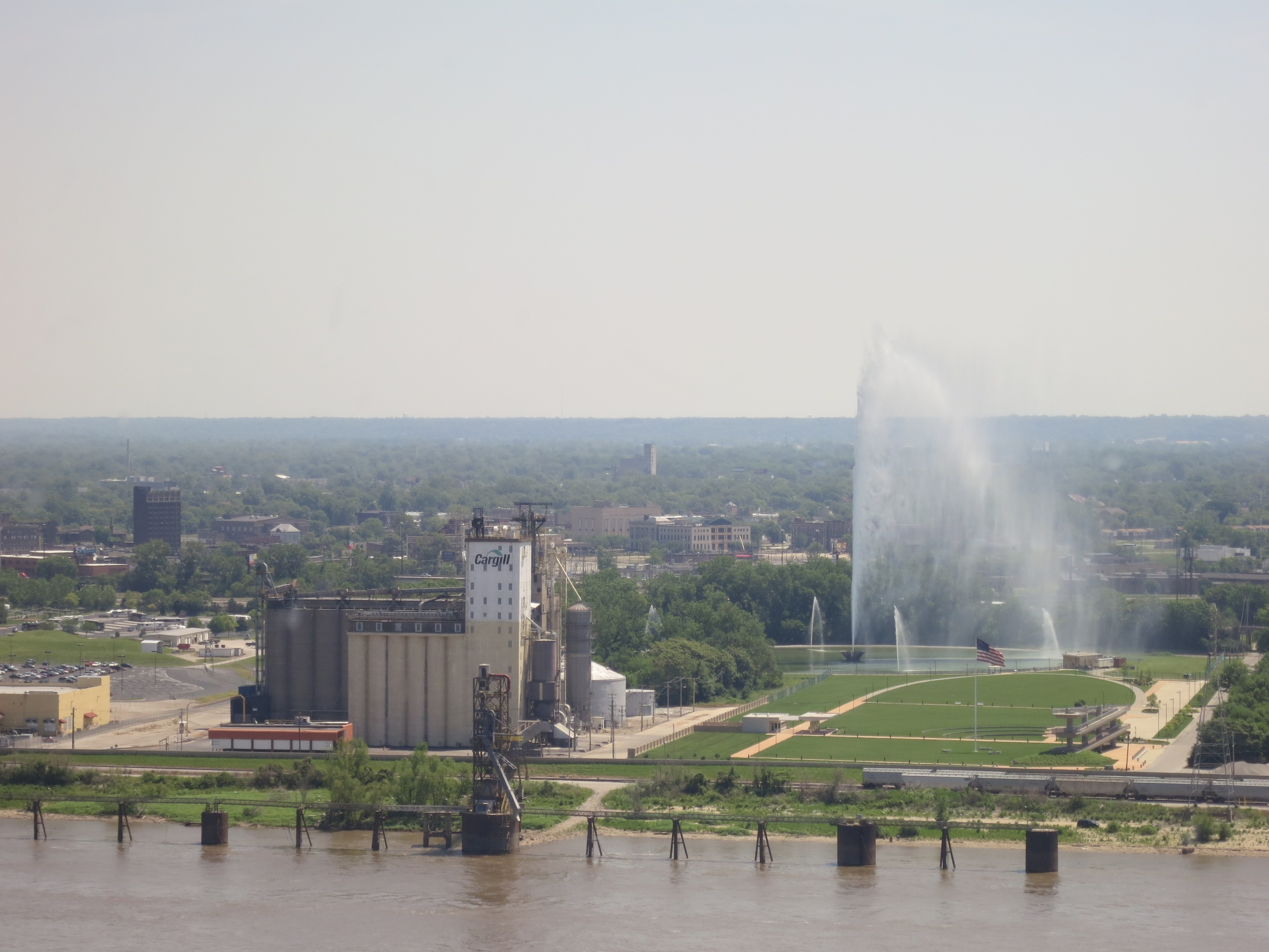

- Location within Illinois
- Location: East St. Louis, Illinois, United States
- Coordinates: 38°37′22″N 90°10′14″W
- Area: 31.4 acres (12.7 ha)
- Opened: 2009
- Parking: On site, south side.
- Public transit: East Riverfront
- Facilities: Gateway Arch viewpoint and Mississippi River Overlook; Gateway Geyser
- Website: Metro East Park and Recreation District

Malcolm W. Martin Memorial Park is a park on the east side of the Mississippi River in East St. Louis, Illinois, directly across from the Gateway Arch and the city of St. Louis, Missouri. For 29 years, its major feature was the Gateway Geyser, a fountain that lifted water up to 630 feet (192 m), the same height as the Arch. Four smaller fountains around the Geyser represent the four rivers which converge near the two cities: The Mississippi, Missouri, Illinois, and Meramec. The geyser was closed in 2023 due to costs of refurbishment and to prepare the park for being handed over to the National Park Service as an extension of the Gateway memorial. The park also includes an elevated viewing point overlooking the river.

== History ==
=== Vision ===
Arch designer Eero Saarinen conceptualized a memorial touching both banks of the Mississippi River, but funding was not provided for the east side as the extensive Gateway Arch National Park (then known as the Jefferson National Expansion Memorial) took shape in St. Louis, of which the Arch is the most prominent element. One of the many supporters of the 1947 effort to fund that landmark was St. Louis attorney Malcolm W. Martin. After two decades without development on the Illinois side, Martin founded the Gateway Center of Metropolitan St. Louis to fund land acquisition for a park there, in 1968. He headed a federal committee in 1987 planning its design, and won an award for his work the following year.

Martin came home to St. Louis after graduating from Yale in 1933 to get his law degree from St. Louis City College of Law. He left for Europe in World War II and contributed to the Normandy D-Day invasion. Upon his second return to St. Louis, he became involved in many aspects of the community, including as a member of the St. Louis Board of Education and a founder of the area's PBS affiliate.

=== Realization ===
Work began with the installation of a 100-foot (30 m) flagpole, shortly after Gateway Center purchased the site from Illinois Central Railroad. The fountain first gushed on May 27, 1995, with Martin at the switch, and when he died in 2004, he left $5 million for the addition of the Mississippi River Overlook and completion of the park. On June 17, 2005, ownership of the site was transferred to the Metro East Park and Recreation District, and the park officially opened in June 2009. Gateway Center continues to pay for the park, but MEPRD owns and maintains it.

== Features ==
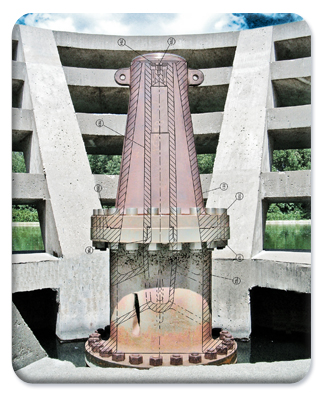
Technical drawing transposed over Gateway Geyser nozzle photo.

- Gateway Geyser
- Mississippi River Overlook
- Malcolm W. Martin Statue
- Web camera
- Green space and concrete paths
- Benches throughout the park
- Free parking lot on site
- 24-hour security station

The overlook platform provides scenic views of the St. Louis Arch and city skyline, the river, and the fountain. It officially opened June 6, 2009.

The geyser has one scheduled eruption every day from May 1 to September 30. Each eruption lasts 10-minutes and is dependent on wind, weather, and drought conditions. The Gateway Geyser hibernates October through April.

== Design ==
The Gateway Geyser was designed and constructed by St. Louis–based Hydro Dramatics. Three 800-horsepower (600 kW) pumps power the fountain, discharging 7,500 U.S. gallons of water per minute (50 L/s) at a speed of 250 feet (76 m) per second. The fountain has an axial thrust of 103,000 pounds-force (460 kN); water is jetted out of the 6-foot (1.8 m)-tall aerated nozzle at a pressure of 550 pounds per square inch (3.8 MPa). The four smaller fountains use 125-horsepower pumps, and each is fed by water from an 8-acre (3.2 ha), million-gallon (3.8m l) lake in which they sit. The Geyser has an electronic system that shuts it down when winds exceed 13 miles per hour (20.9 km/h).

The Overlook is a five-tiered rising walkway that culminates in a platform 40 feet (12 m) above the bank of the river. It is made of concrete and steel, with lighted railings on all sides. A bronze statue of Martin is sitting at the top, facing the view of the Arch that he helped preserve. A live web camera provides constant access to the scene. The statue was designed by St. Louis sculptor Harry Weber.

== Gallery ==
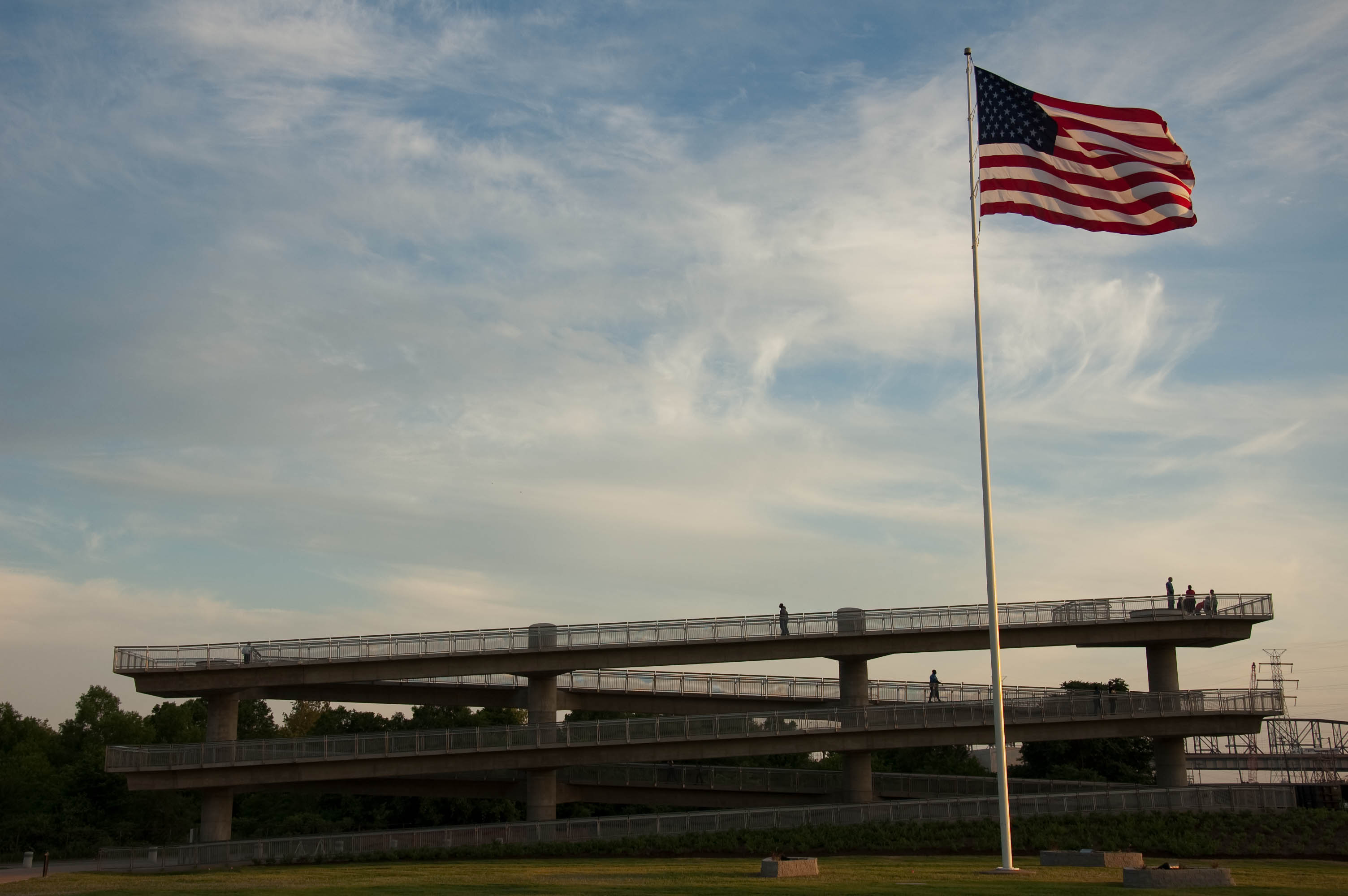
Malcolm W. Martin Memorial Park overlook platform and flag, June 2009

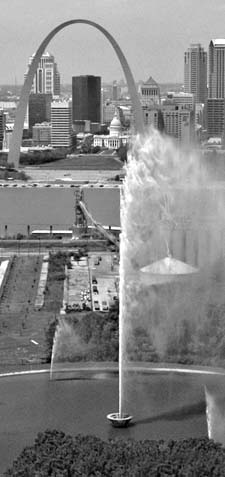
Gateway Fountain Looking West past the 600' tall Gateway Fountain, in 2005

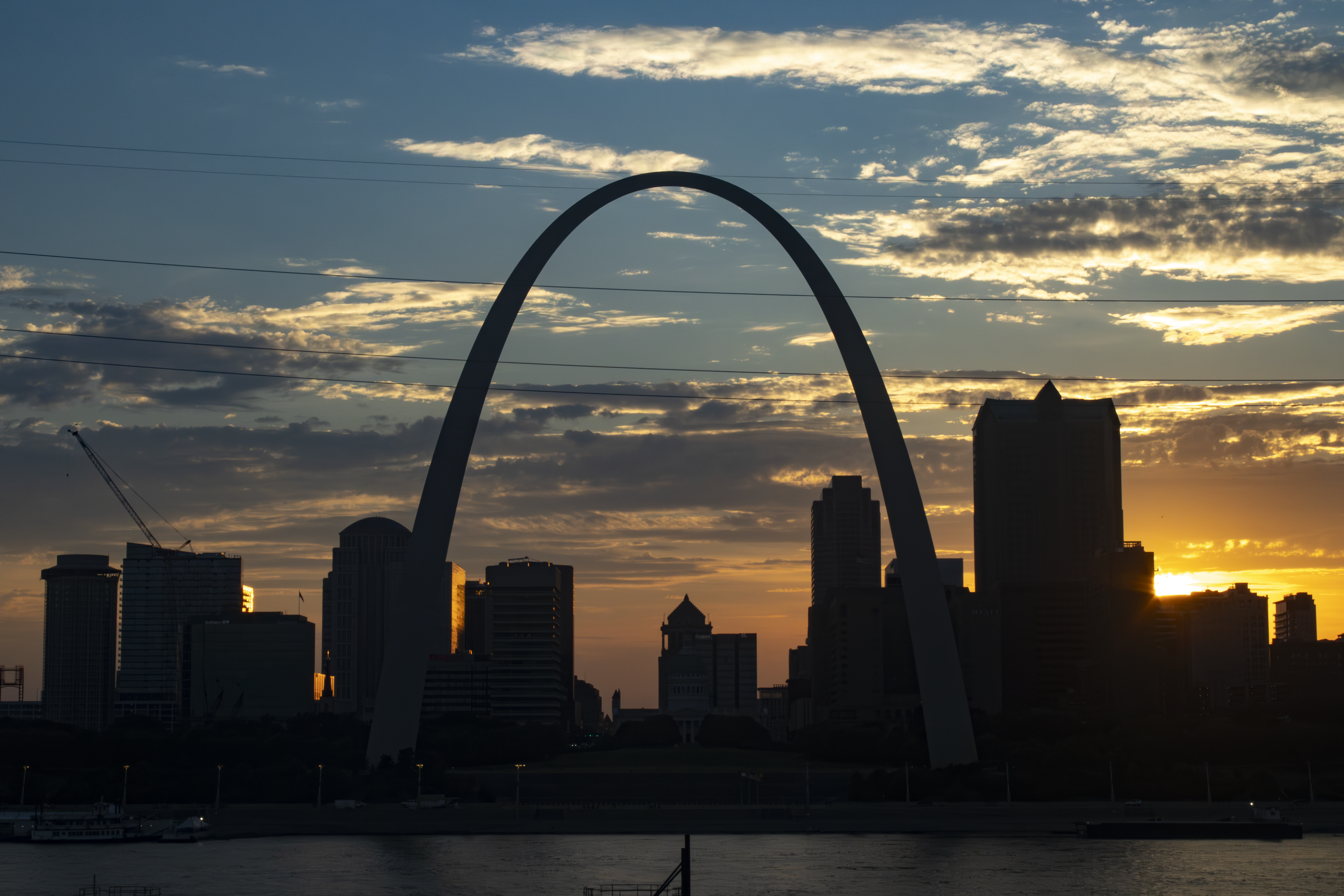
View from the overlook.
