= Madison County Transit =

Public transit and bike trail system in Madison County, Illinois, U.S.

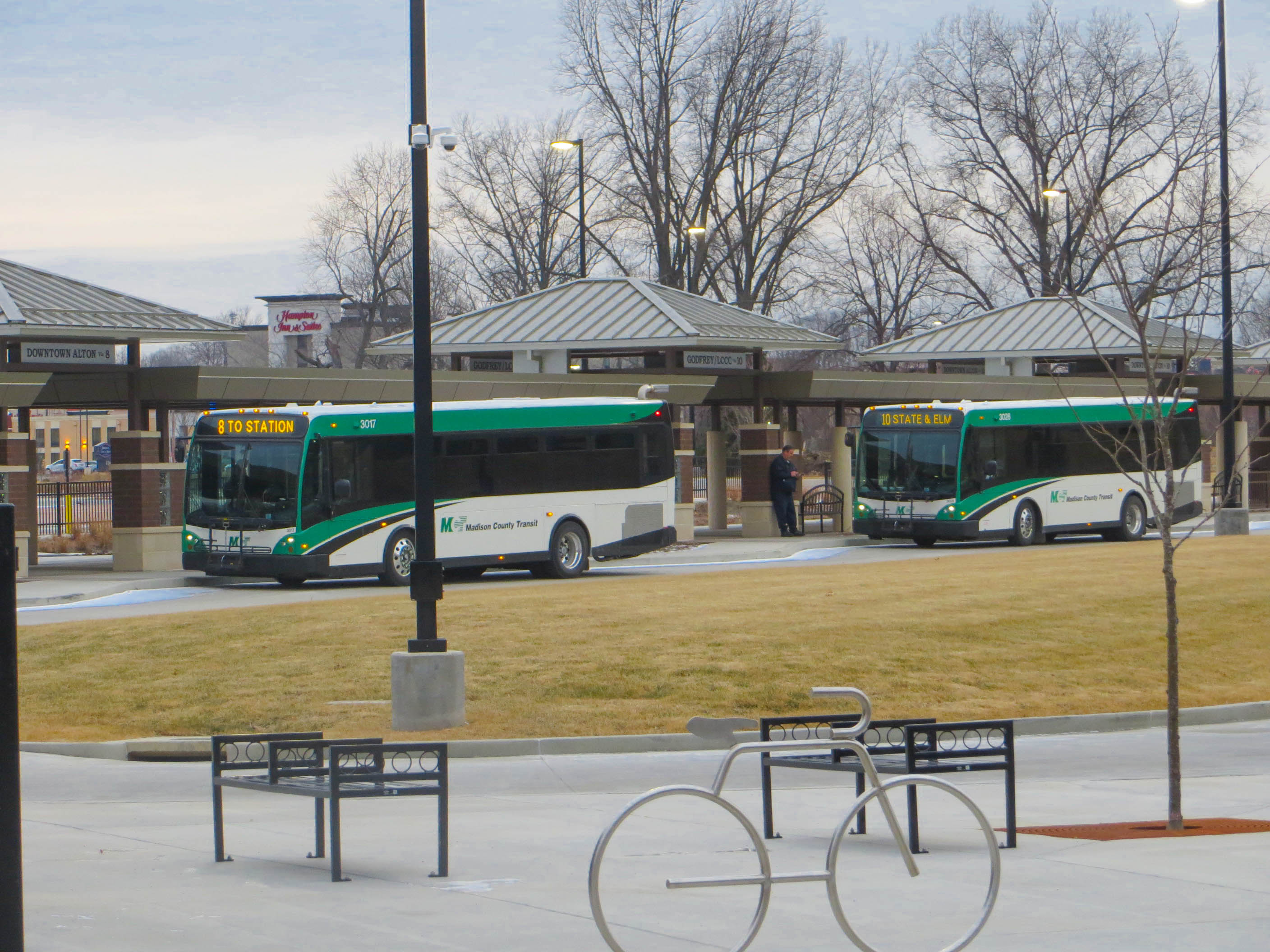
- Two MCT buses at the Alton multimodal station
- Founded: 1980
- Headquarters: 1 Transit Way; Pontoon Beach, Illinois, 62040, U.S.
- Service area: Madison County, Illinois; St. Clair County, Illinois; St. Louis, Missouri
- Service type: Bus; Paratransit; Shared-use paths
- Alliance: Metro Transit; St. Clair County Transit District
- Routes: 22 bus routes 12 shared-used paths
- Hubs: 5 transit centers 18 park and ride lots
- Fleet: 88 Diesel buses 26 Paratransit vans
- Daily ridership: 5,600 (weekdays, Q2 2026)
- Annual ridership: 1,681,400 (2025)
- Chief executive: SJ Morrison
- Website: mct.org

Madison County Transit (MCT) is a public transit operator that serves Madison County, Illinois, a suburban county northeast of St. Louis. Its services include bus, microtransit, paratransit, and a "rails to trails" network. In 2025, the system had an annual ridership of 1,681,400, or about 5,600 per weekday as of the second quarter of 2026.

== History ==
=== Interurban era ===
An Illinois Terminal train on Hadley Street in 1928 before realignment

Public transit in Madison County previously included interurban lines operated by the Illinois Terminal Railroad (ITC). These lines connected commuters with Danville, Illinois to the east, Peoria, Illinois to the north, and St. Louis to the west. The first Madison County alignment opened between Granite City and Staunton on June 4, 1906. In November of that year, the ITC reached the corner of Third Street and Broadway in East St. Louis, Illinois, near the Eads Bridge. However, owners of the bridge refused trackage rights so passengers were forced to transfer to steam trains to enter St. Louis.

With the bulk of Illinois Terminal traffic traveling between Madison County and St. Louis, ITC decided to build its own bridge over the Mississippi River to a new terminal. The McKinley Bridge and a new street-running alignment in St. Louis entered service on October 10, 1910 with a passenger terminal opening in December 1911 at 12th Street and Lucas Avenue.

By the late 1920s, the Illinois Terminal and partner railroads operated freight and passenger service to Madison County communities including; Alton, Edwardsville, Hartford, and Wood River. In 1927, the Venice High Line opened between the McKinley Bridge and the St. Louis, Troy & Eastern Railway in Madison. The 1.8-mile (2.9 km) long trestle was built to bypass busy surface streets and crossed over eight railroads and one yard. Much of the trestle had been demolished by 2006.

Due to street traffic and congestion at its terminals in St. Louis, ITC began a track realignment and terminal replacement project in 1930. In January 1933, a new 2.6-mile (4.2 km) elevated/subway alignment and Central Terminal Building were put into full service. The project eliminated seven streetcar crossings, 29 grade crossings, and improved running time by seven minutes.

On March 8, 1953, service between Alton and St. Louis was ended due to declining profitability and ridership. In 1956, ITC abandoned the trackage between Edwardsville and Madison and filed to end its remaining 134 daily train trips between St. Louis and Granite City due to declining profitability and ridership. In 1958, the McKinley Bridge was sold to the City of Venice for $13.5 million. Later that year, ITC car 457 made the last scheduled run on the Illinois Terminal system.

The 2.6-mile (4.2 km) elevated/subway trackage remained in use until 2004 to deliver newsprint rolls to the St. Louis Post-Dispatch, whose basement loading docks were accessed via the subway. After closing in 2004, the elevated section of the alignment was purchased by Great Rivers Greenway for $1.5 million for conversion into an elevated park. A $33.8 million project to fill the subway portion of the alignment beneath Tucker Boulevard in downtown St. Louis was completed in 2013.

=== Modern era ===
The Madison County Transit District was created in 1980 by the Madison County Board to improve transportation within the county. In 1981, the Illinois General Assembly passed the Local Mass Transit District Act allowing counties to levy up to a quarter-cent sales tax for public transportation. Shortly after, the Metro East Mass Transit District began levying a quarter-cent sales tax in both Madison and St. Clair counties.

In 1985, Agency for Community Transit Inc. (ACT), a 501(c)(3) corporation was formed to provide paratransit service for residents of Madison County. Today, the agency operates MCT's bus, microtransit, and paratransit services. In the early 1990s, MCT began its “rails to trails” program with the goal of preserving former rail corridors for future transit use and interim trail use. Today, the system has 138 miles (222 km) of trails.

In May 2024, the district opened a new 26,416 square foot headquarters building on its campus in Pontoon Beach, Illinois. That August, the district launched MCT Micro, a microtransit service that operates within Collinsville, Bethalto, College Hills, Edwardsville, Troy, and Maryville, with partial service to Glen Carbon.

== Services ==
=== Bus ===
Madison County Transit currently operates 18 local bus routes and four express bus routes. Local routes operate within Madison and St. Clair counties while express routes provide service to downtown St. Louis in Missouri. In 2008, MCT launched the Summer Youth Pass which allows those 18 years of age or younger to ride for free between Memorial Day and Labor Day. That same year, Illinois Public Act 095-0708 went into effect, allowing all elderly/disabled people to ride bus services for free. All buses are equipped with security cameras, an accessible lift or ramp and priority seating, and have the ability to "kneel" or lower themselves closer to the ground during boarding. Additionally, all buses are equipped with bike racks as part of MCT's "bike and bus" program with an estimated 1,700 cyclists riding each month.

Fixed route bus service is operated by Agency for Community Transit Inc. (ACT).

=== Paratransit ===
Since 1985, Madison County Transit has provided a paratransit service called Runabout for elderly and disabled residents. Riders must register with ACT to use the service and have a verified disability or be 65 years of age or older. MCT estimates annual ridership at 36,000 riders with an average monthly ridership between 1,800 and 3,700 riders.

In 2024, MCT launched MCT Micro, a microtransit service that operates within Collinsville, Illinois. Riders schedule a $1.00 ride via a smartphone app called MCT Micro while those without app access can call MCT to schedule a ride. Both Runabout and MCT Micro are operated by ACT.

=== MCT Trails ===
MCT Trails launched in the early 1990s to preserve former rail corridors for future transit use and interim trail use. Today, the system is made up of 138 miles (222 km) of pathways across 12 trails. There are 22 tunnels, 49 bridges, and 1,585 acres of green space across the network. Roughly $45 million has been spent on the trail system to date.

Major trails include:

- Confluence Trail: The Confluence Trail is a 20.5-mile (33.0 km) asphalt and rock trail running along the Mississippi River between Venice, Illinois and Alton, Illinois. A connection to the Great Rivers Greenway District's Mississippi Greenway and Riverfront Trail in St. Louis can be made via the McKinley Bridge.
- Goshen Trail: The Goshen Trail is a 19.5-mile (31.4 km) asphalt trail and considered the "spine" of the network. It begins near South Roxana and ends in O'Fallon, Illinois and is the only trail that connects Madison County with St. Clair County, Illinois.
- Nickel Plate Trail: The Nickel Plate Trail is a 28.5-mile (45.9 km) asphalt and limestone trail and is the longest trail in the network. It begins in New Douglas, Illinois and ends in Pontoon Beach, Illinois.
- Quercus Grove Trail: The Quercus Grove Trail is a 18.9-mile (30.4 km) asphalt and limestone trail traveling between downtown Edwardsville and rural Staunton, Illinois.
- Schoolhouse Trail: The Schoolhouse Trail is a 15.5-mile (24.9 km) asphalt trail traveling between Troy and Madison, Illinois.

== Fares ==
When boarding a bus, riders with valid passes present them to the operator and those without passes are able to pay exact change into the onboard farebox.

Additionally, MCT accepts most Metro Transit fares on its services, however, this excludes mobile fares.

Madison County Transit Fare Structure
Fare Type	Mode	Current Fare
Local	Bus	$1.00
Express	Bus	$3.00
Local (Half Fare)*	Bus	$0.50
Express (Half Fare)*	Bus	$1.50
2-Hour Regional Pass	Bus	$3.00
Day Pass	Bus	$5.00
7 Day Pass^{†}	Bus	$15.00
Student Monthly Pass	Bus	$15.00
Local 30 Day Pass^{†}	Bus	$40.00
Local Monthly Pass	Bus	$40.00
System Monthly Pass	Bus	$70.00
MCT Micro	Van	$1.00
* Reduced fares require an MCT Half Fare ID or Metro reduced fare permit † Only available as a mobile fare option on the Token Transit app

== Fixed bus routes ==
=== MCT Local ===
Bus routes that travel within Madison County and to St. Clair County, Illinois:

No.	Name	Notes
1	Riverbend	Route operates between the Granite City and Alton stations. Serves Hartford Library and several retail stores. Connection to MCT Confluence Trail.
2	Granite City Shuttle	Route operates between Venice, Illinois and Northgate. Serves Gateway Regional Medical Center and several retail stores. Connection to MCT Nature Trail.
4	Madison-Edwardsville	Route operates between Madison, Illinois and Edwardsville, Illinois. Serves Southwestern Illinois College, Southern Illinois University Edwardsville, and the Madison County courthouse.
6	Roxana-Pontoon Beach	Route operates between Pontoon Beach, Illinois and the Wood River station. Also serves Roxana, Illinois.
7	Alton-Edwardsville	Route operates between Alton, Illinois and Edwardsville. Serves Wood River, Illinois and the Alton Regional Multimodal Station.
8	Central Shuttle	Route operates between the downtown Alton bus station and the Alton Regional Multimodal Station. Also serves Alton Square Mall and St. Anthony's Hospital.
9	Washington Shuttle	Route operates between the downtown Alton bus station and Alton Square Mall.
10	State & Elm Shuttle	Route operates between the Alton Regional Multimodal Station and downtown Alton. Serves Alton Square Mall and Lewis and Clark Community College.
11	Brown Shuttle	Route operates between the downtown Alton bus station and Cottage Hills, Illinois.
13	Troy-Glen Carbon	Route operates between Glen Carbon, Illinois and Troy, Illinois. Serves Anderson Hospital.
14	Highland-SIUE	Route operates between Southern Illinois University Edwardsville and Highland, Illinois.
16	Edwardsville-Glen Carbon Shuttle	Route operates between the downtown Edwardsville bus station and Glen Carbon. Connections to MCT Goshen, Nature and Nickel Plate trails.
17	Cougar Shuttle	A free route connecting various locations on the campus of Southern Illinois University Edwardsville.
18	Collinsville Regional	Route operates between the Collinsville bus station and the Emerson Park Transit Center in East St. Louis. Serves Fairmount Park Racetrack.
19	Edwardsville-Collinsville	Route operates between Collinsville, Illinois and the downtown Edwardsville bus station. Connections to MCT Nature, Nickel Plate and Schoolhouse trails.
20	Gateway Commerce Center-Emerson Park	Route operates between the Gateway Commerce Center in Pontoon Beach and the Emerson Park Transit Center in East St. Louis.
21	West Collinsville Shuttle	Route operates solely in Collinsville. Serves retail stores and local government facilities.
22	University Shuttle	Route operates between Southern Illinois University Edwardsville and the downtown Edwardsville bus station. Connections to MCT Goshen, Nature, Nickel Plate and Watershed trails.

=== MCT Express ===
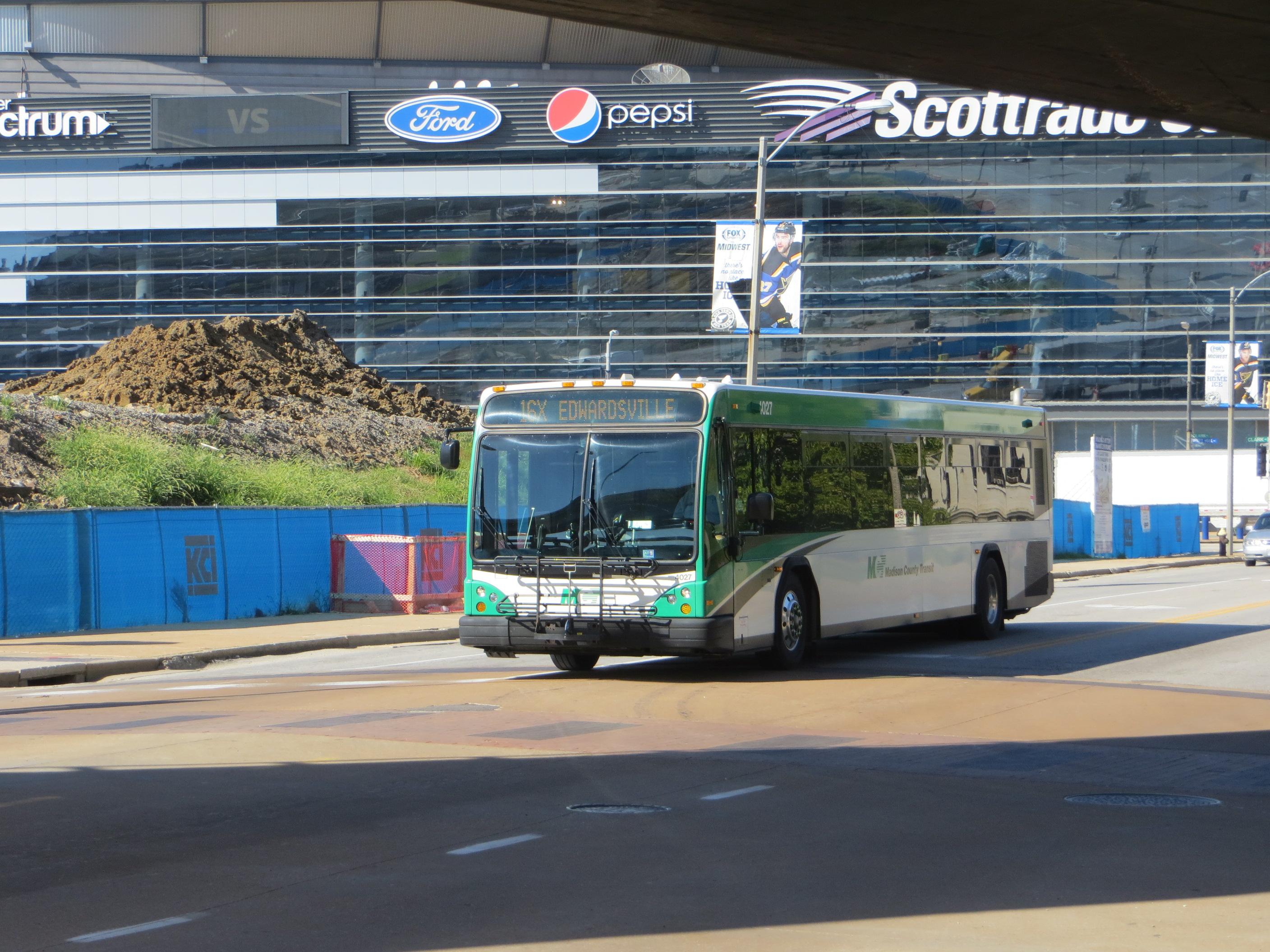
An MCT express bus in downtown St. Louis

Bus routes that travel between Madison County and downtown St. Louis:

No.	Name	Notes
1X	Riverbend Express	Route operates between downtown St. Louis and Godfrey, Illinois. Serves several attractions in downtown St. Louis and Alton Square Mall.
5	Tri-City Regional	Route operates between the Emerson Park Transit Center in East St. Louis, Illinois to Granite City station. Select trips serve downtown St. Louis.
14X	Highland Express	Route operates between downtown St. Louis and Highland, Illinois. Serves the Convention Center MetroLink station.
16X	Edwardsville-Glen Carbon Express	Route operates between downtown St. Louis and the downtown Edwardsville bus station. Serves Collinsville and Glen Carbon.

=== Special Service ===
During The Muny season, Madison County Transit operates the Muny Express service between the Illinois communities of Alton, Edwardsville and Highland and the theater in St. Louis.

== Fleet ==
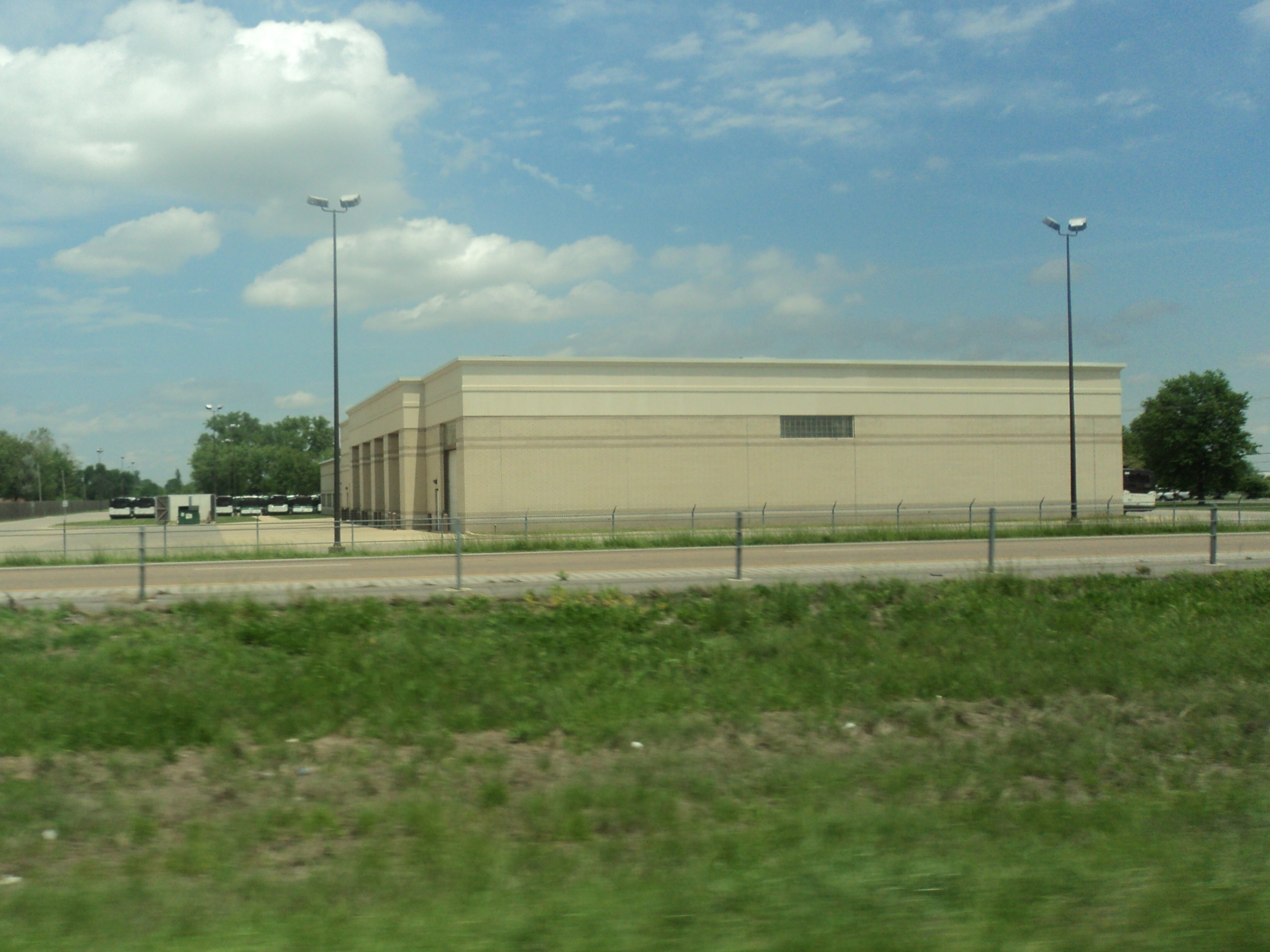
Madison County Transit garage

Madison County Transit operates a fleet of 88 fixed route buses and 26 paratransit vans. All vehicles have an accessible lift or ramp and include priority seating. Additionally, all buses have a bike rack, available first-come, first-served.

Buses and vans are serviced and stored at the district's only depot, located on their headquarters campus in Pontoon Beach, Illinois.

== Organization ==
=== Leadership ===
Madison County Transit is managed by a five-member Board of Trustees appointed by the Madison County Board. Its managing director is SJ Morrison. As of 2024, the district had 220 full-time employees and 63 part-time employees.

=== Funding ===
Madison County Transit's operating budget is primarily funded by sales taxes from the Local Mass Transit District Act and support from the Illinois Department of Transportation. Other funds come from federal grants and fare-paying passengers. MCT's projected operating budget for FY2025 is $40,352,000. Sales tax receipts and IDOT assistance are estimated at $12.8 million and $21 million, respectively. Other estimated receipts include $1,890,000 in federal funds and $1.9 million in fares.

Sales tax ballot initiatives
Ballot measure	Year	Sales tax	Result
Local Mass Transit District Act	1981	0.25%	Passed
Proposition M	1997	0.5%	Failed

== Defunct plans ==
=== Light rail ===
In 1997, Madison County voters rejected a half-cent sales tax for light rail expansion.

In 2005, the East-West Gateway Council of Governments, in conjunction with MCT and Metro Transit, studied extending MetroLink into Madison County. The study recommended two alignments that would have begun near the 5th & Missouri station in East St. Louis with service to Granite City, Collinsville, Wood River, and Glen Carbon between 21–23 miles (34–37 km) away. The alignment would have split in Madison, Illinois with one branch ending in Alton and the other in Edwardsville. However, with no local funding source the project never moved beyond the initial study phase.

== See also ==
- Bi-State Development Agency
- Metro Transit (St. Louis)
- St. Clair County Transit District
- Transportation in St. Louis
