= James E. Williams (East St. Louis mayor) =

American politician

Mayor of East Saint Louis
- In office 1971–1975
- Preceded by: Alvin G. Fields
- Succeeded by: William E. Mason

Personal details
- Born: September 15, 1921
- Died: February 13, 1983 (aged 61)
- Education: B.A. Wilberforce University; M.S.Iowa State University; J.D. Saint Louis University School of Law

James Estel Williams Sr. (September 15, 1921 – February 13, 1983) was an American attorney, teacher, and politician who became the first black mayor of East St. Louis, Illinois.

On April 6, 1971, Williams as a political newcomer and independent defeated Virgil Calvert, another black candidate who had been a member of the city council by a vote of 10,813 to 8,202. On April 1, 1975, he was defeated by William E. Mason, a Democrat who was a school district superintendent and who became the city's second black mayor. After serving as mayor, he served as board of education president from 1976 to 1978.

Williams was born in the state of Kentucky. He graduated from Saint Louis University School of Law in 1962, from Iowa State University in 1948 with a masters of science degree in animal husbandry, and from Wilberforce University in Ohio with an undergraduate degree. He had taught farming techniques for the Veterans Administration in Owensboro, Kentucky, and science class in Lincoln Ridge, Kentucky. Williams had been a member of the American Bar Association, the Illinois Bar Association, and the American Trial Layers Association. He was also drafted into the U.S. Army during World War II.

Williams died February 13, 1983, at Barnes Hospital in St. Louis, Missouri, at age 61 after suffering from heart disease. His wife Lillian Harrison Croom Williams (1922-2019) had worked as a teacher and also graduated from Wilberforce University, the nation's first private historically black university. Their son James E. "Jimmy" Williams Jr., a former U.S. Navy Pilot, has been the president and CEO of Estel Foods which operates McDonald's franchises in Illinois and Missouri for which he has received numerous awards.

Williams was buried at Sunset Gardens of Memory Cemetery in Millstadt, Illinois, until 2019 when his wife died, and they we both placed at Jefferson Barracks National Cemetery in Lemay, Missouri.

Preceded by	Mayor of East Saint Louis; 1971–1975	Succeeded by William E. Mason
