= East St. Louis, Illinois =

City in Illinois, United States

- City
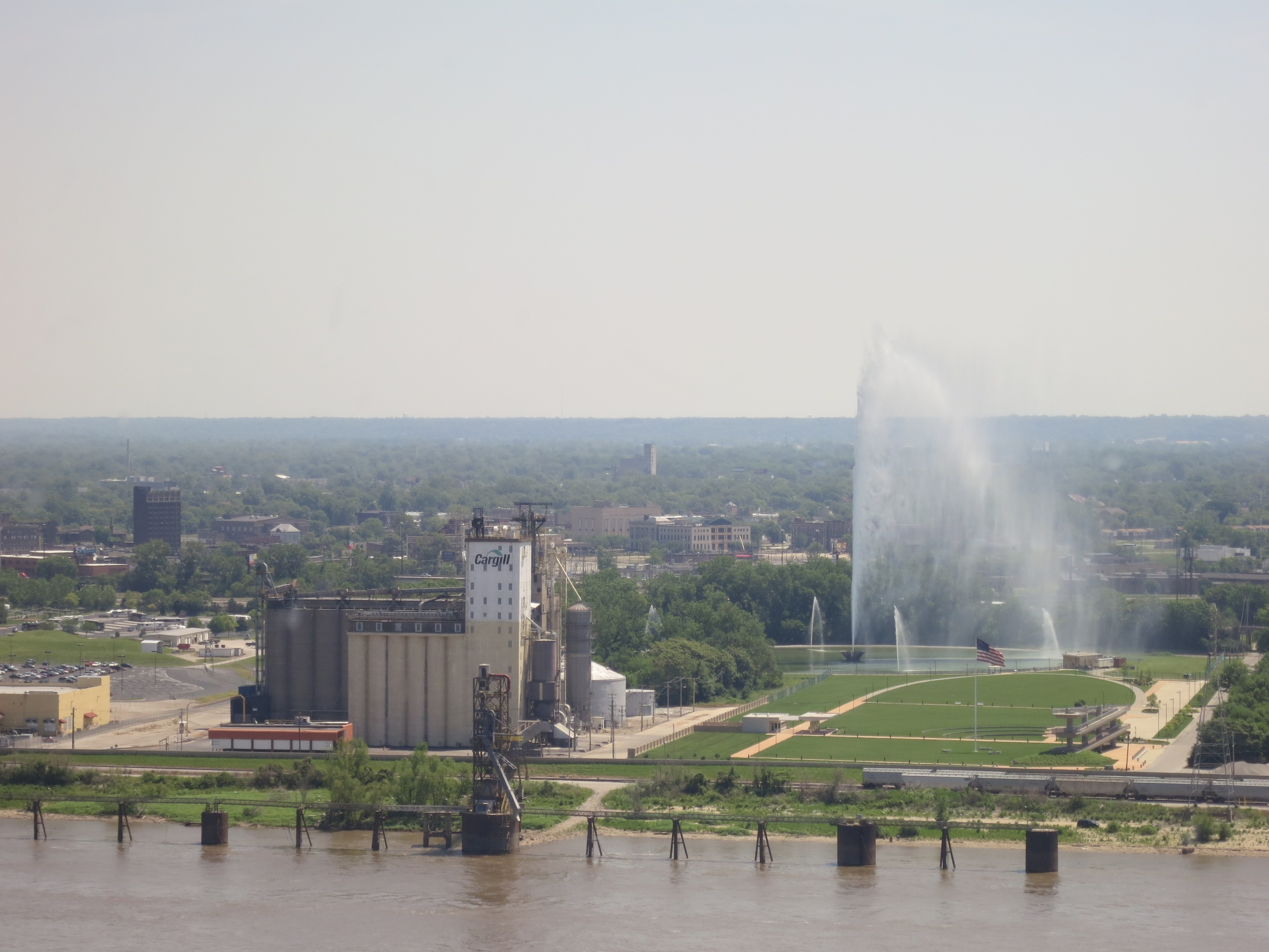
- East St. Louis and the Gateway Geyser in 2012

- Flag Seal

- Location of East St. Louis in St. Clair County, Illinois

- Location within Illinois Location within the United States
- Coordinates: 38°37′30″N 90°9′27″W
- Country: United States
- State: Illinois
- County: St. Clair
- Township: East St. Louis (coterminous)
- Founded: June 6, 1820
- Incorporated: February 16, 1865

Government
  - Type: Council–manager

Area
  - Total: 14.30 sq mi (37.03 km^{2})
  - Land: 13.92 sq mi (36.05 km^{2})
  - Water: 0.38 sq mi (0.98 km^{2})
- Elevation: 413 ft (126 m)

Population (2020)
  - Total: 18,469
  - Estimate (2023): 17,642 ▼
  - Density: 1,326.9/sq mi (512.33/km^{2})
- Time zone: UTC−6 (CST)
  - Summer (DST): UTC−5 (CDT)
- ZIP Codes: 62201–62207
- Area code: 618
- FIPS code: 17-163-22268
- Website: cesl.us

East St. Louis or East Saint Louis, also known as ESTL, is a city in St. Clair County, Illinois, United States. It is across the Mississippi River from downtown St. Louis, Missouri, and the Gateway Arch National Park. East St. Louis is in the Metro East region of Southern Illinois. East St. Louis was Illinois's fourth-largest city in 1950, when its population peaked at 82,366. As of the 2020 census, the city had a population of 18,469, less than one-quarter of the 1950 census and a decline of almost one-third since 2010.

== History ==
Native Americans had long inhabited both sides of the Mississippi River. The Mississippian culture rulers organized thousands of workers to construct complex earthwork mounds at what later became St. Louis and East St. Louis. The center of this culture was the urban complex of Cahokia, located to the northeast of present-day East St. Louis within Collinsville, Illinois. Before the Civil War, settlers reported up to 50 mounds in the area that became East St. Louis, but most were lost to 19th-century development and later roadbuilding.

East St. Louis lies within the fertile American Bottom area of the present day Metro East area of St. Louis, Missouri. This name was given after the United States acquired the Louisiana Purchase in 1803, and more European Americans began to settle in the area. The village was first named "Illinoistown".

East St. Louis was founded in 1797 by Captain James Piggott, a Revolutionary War veteran. In that year Piggott began operating a ferry service across the Mississippi River, connecting Illinoistown with St. Louis, which had been founded by ethnic French families. When Piggott died in 1799, his widow sold the ferry business, moved to St. Louis County and remarried. One of the Piggotts' great-great-granddaughters became known as actress Virginia Mayo (Virginia Clara Jones).

The municipality called East St. Louis was established on April 1, 1861. Illinoistown residents voted on a new name that day, and 183 voted to rename the town East St. Louis. Though it started as a small town, East St. Louis soon grew to a larger city, influenced by the growing economy of St. Louis, which in 1870 was the fourth-largest city in the United States.

=== Great Railroad Strike of 1877 ===
Extensive industrial growth followed the American Civil War, helped by the city's proximity to coal mines in Illinois. Early industry included meatpacking and stockyards, concentrated in one area to limit their nuisance to other jurisdictions.

Many businessmen became overextended in credit, and a major economic collapse followed the Panic of 1873. This was due to railroad and other manufacturing expansion, land speculation, and general business optimism caused by large profits from inflation. The economic recession began in the East and steadily moved West, crippling the railroads, the main system of transportation. In response, railroad companies began dramatically lowering workers' wages, forcing employees to work without pay, and cutting jobs and paid work hours. These wage cuts and additional money-saving tactics prompted strikes and massive unrest.

While most of the strikes in the eastern cities during 1877 were accompanied by violence, the late July 1877 St. Louis strike was marked by a bloodless and quick takeover by dissatisfied workers. By July 22, the St. Louis Commune began to take shape, as representatives from almost all the railroad lines met in East St. Louis. They soon elected an executive committee to command the strike and issued General Order No. 1, halting all railroad traffic other than passenger and mail trains. John Bowman, the mayor of East St. Louis, was appointed arbitrator of the committee. He helped the committee select special police to guard the property of the railroads from damage. The strike and the new de facto workers' government, while given encouragement by the largely German-American Workingmen's Party and the Knights of Labor (two key players in the organization of the Missouri general strike), were run by no organized labor group.

The strike also closed packing industry houses surrounding the National Stock Yards. At one plant, workers allowed processing of 125 cattle in return for 500 cans of beef for the workers. Though the East St. Louis strike continued in an orderly fashion, across the river in St. Louis there were isolated incidents of violence. Harry Eastman, the East St. Louis workers' representative, addressed the mass of employees:

Go home to your different wards and organize your different unions, but don't keep coming up here in great bodies and stirring up excitement. Ask the Mayor, as we did, to close up all the saloons ... keep sober and orderly, and when you are organized, apply to the United Workingmen for orders. Don't plunder ... don't interfere with the railroads here ... let us attend to that.

The strikers held the railroads and city for about a week, without the violence that took place in Chicago and other cities. The federal government intervened, and on July 28 US troops took over the Relay Depot, the Commune's command center, and the strike ended peacefully.

=== Great Cyclone of 1896 ===
On May 27, 1896, a tornado struck St. Louis and East St. Louis. The deadliest tornado ever to hit the cities, the 20-minute storm killed 137 people in St. Louis and 118 in East St. Louis. Its destruction spanned 10 miles (16 km), including the railyards and commercial districts of East St. Louis, destroying 311 buildings and severely damaging 7,200 more. The cost was estimated between $10 million and $12 million, at a time when a two-story brick house could be purchased for $1,500.

=== East St. Louis riots of 1917 ===
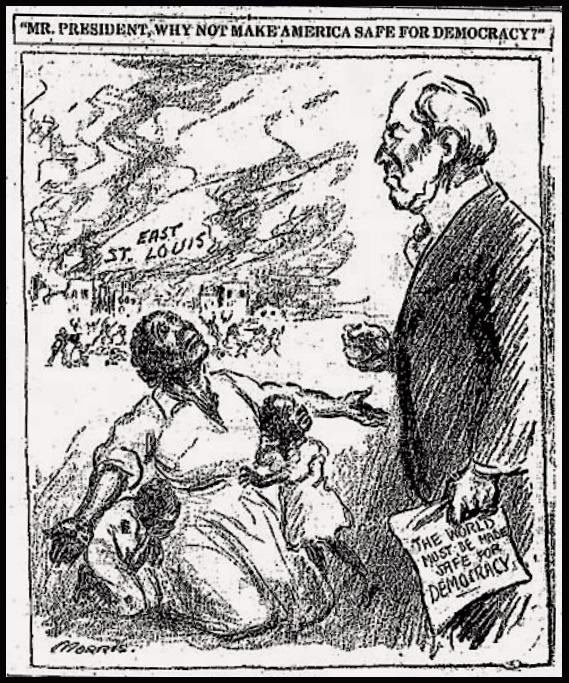
1917 political cartoon on the massacre. The caption reads, "Mr. President, why not make America safe for democracy?", referring to President Woodrow Wilson's catchphrase "The world must be made safe for democracy".

East St. Louis in 1917 had a strong industrial economy boosted by US economic participation in demands related to World War I; although war was declared in April, the nation did not meaningfully enter the war until that fall. Industry was dominated by European immigrant workers, who had been coming to industrial cities since the late 19th century. Here and across the country, they repeatedly tried to organize in efforts to gain better wages and working conditions. In the summer of 1916, 2,500 white workers struck the nearby meat packing plants of National City. Companies recruited black workers, sometimes importing them from the South. While the white workers won a wage increase, the companies retained some black workers, firing white ones. Such economic competition raised tensions between the groups in a period when the number of blacks in East St. Louis had increased dramatically due to the first Great Migration, when African Americans left poor rural areas of the South to escape Jim Crow oppression and seek jobs in the industrial cities of the North and the Midwest. From 1910 to 1917, the black population nearly doubled in East St. Louis.

The United States established a draft which would bring in many workers to the military. As the war prevented immigration from Europe even before the U.S. entered the war, major companies had begun to recruit black workers from the South to fill demand. When white workers went on strike in April 1917 at the Aluminum Ore Company, the employer hired blacks as strikebreakers. The American Steel Company also recruited blacks. They were available in part during this period because the U.S. Army initially rejected many black volunteers in the years before an integrated military. This was also the period of resentment on both sides and the arrival of new workers created fears for job security at a time of union organizing and labor unrest, and raised social tensions. At a large labor meeting of white workers held in City Hall on May 28, men also traded rumors of fraternizing between black men and white women. An inflammatory speaker said, "East St. Louis must remain a white man's town." Three thousand white men left the meeting and headed as a mob for downtown, where they randomly attacked black men on the street. The Illinois governor called in National Guard to prevent further rioting. Still, rumors circulated that the black members of the community were planning an organized retaliation, and tensions remained high.

On July 1, 1917, a black man allegedly attacked a white man. After hearing of this, whites drove by black homes near 17th and Market and fired shots into several of them. When police came to investigate a gathering of a large group of local black residents, their car was mistaken for that of the attackers, and several in the crowd at 10th and Bond fired on the police, killing two detectives. The next morning, thousands of whites mobbed the black sections of the city, indiscriminately beating, shooting, and killing men, women, and children. The rioters burned entire sections of the city and shot black residents as they escaped the flames. They also hung several black residents. The rioters destroyed buildings and physically attacked people; they "killed a 14-year-old boy and scalped his mother. Before it was over, 244 buildings were destroyed." Other sources say 300 buildings were destroyed.

The city had 35 police officers, but they were seen to be doing little to suppress the violence. The governor called in National Guard troops to try to control the situation; they arrived on July 3, but several accounts reported that they joined in the rioting. Most of the violence ended that day, but reports continued afterward of isolated assaults on black citizens. Afterward, the city Chamber of Commerce called for the resignation of the Police Chief and greater oversight of police operations. Losses in property damage were high, including railroad warehouses and carloads full of goods that were burned, as well as railroad cars.

Though official reports suggested that the East St. Louis race riot resulted in the deaths of 39 black citizens and 9 whites, other estimates put the figure much higher, with estimates of 100 to 250 black citizens being killed.

W. E. B. Du Bois of the NAACP came to investigate the riots personally. His organization's photographer published photos of the destruction in the November issue of The Crisis. Congress also held an investigation.

In New York City on July 28, 10,000 black people marched down Fifth Avenue in a Silent Parade, carrying signs and protesting the East St. Louis riots. The march was organized by the National Association for the Advancement of Colored People (NAACP), W. E. B. Du Bois, and groups in Harlem. Women and children were dressed in white; the men were dressed in black.

=== 20th century ===
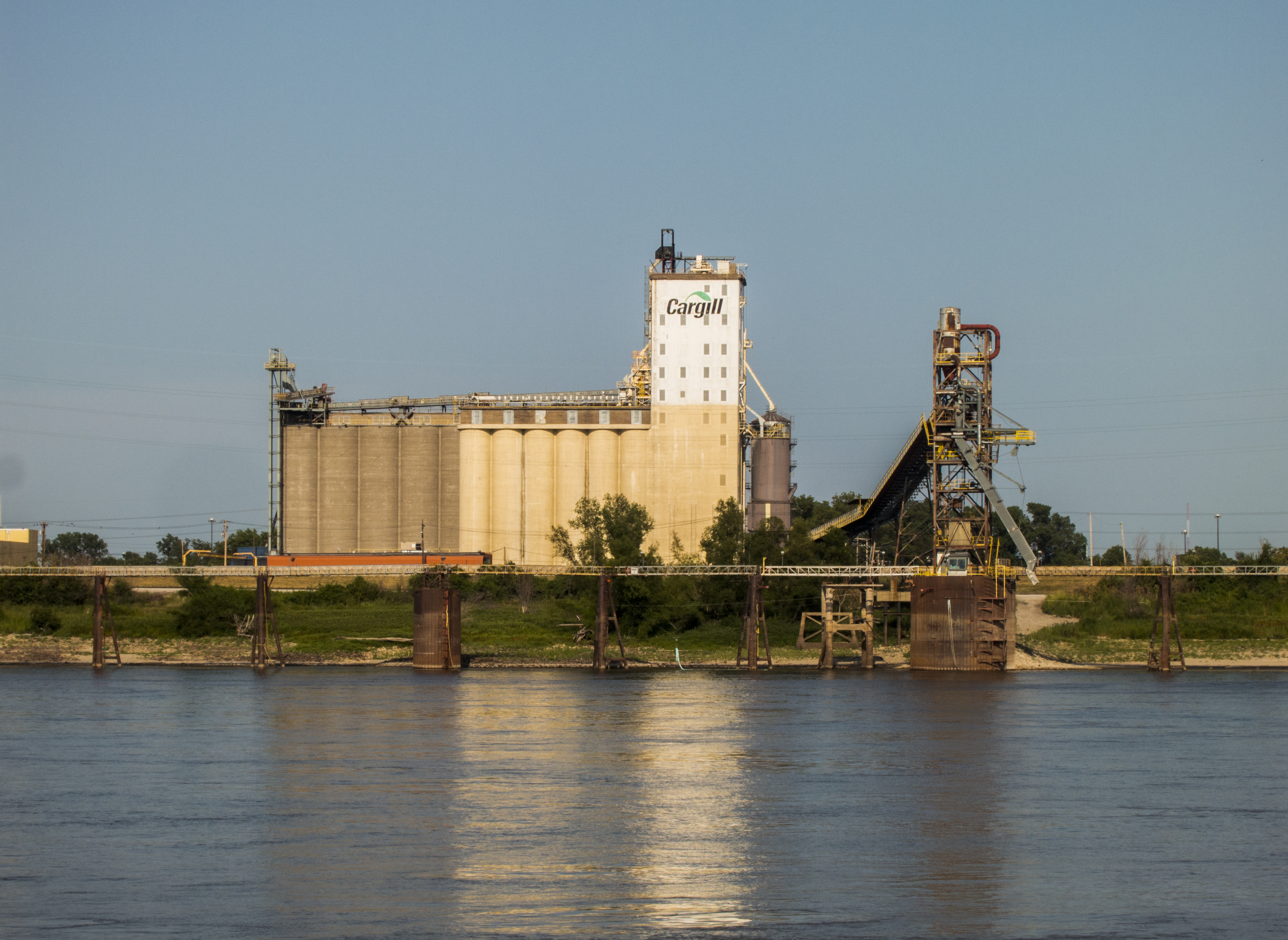
Cargill grain elevator in East St. Louis

East St. Louis continued to have an industry-based economy. During and after World War II, many workers made decent livings. It was named an All-America City in 1959 by the National Civic League. East St. Louis celebrated its centennial in 1961. It was known as the "Pittsburgh of the West". Its population reached a peak of 82,366 residents in the 1950 census, the fourth-largest city in Illinois at the time.

Through the 1950s and later, the city's musicians were an integral creative force in blues, rock and roll, and jazz. Some left and achieved national recognition, such as Ike & Tina Turner. The jazz trumpeter Miles Davis, who became internationally known, was born in nearby Alton and grew up in East St. Louis. The 1999 PBS series River of Song featured these musicians in its coverage of music from cities along the Mississippi River.

The city suffered from the mid-century restructuring of heavy industry and railroads, which led to widespread job losses. As many local factories began to close due to the changes within the industry, the railroad and meatpacking industries also cut back and moved jobs out of the region. This led to a precipitous loss of working- and middle-class jobs. The city's financial conditions deteriorated. Elected in 1951, Mayor Alvin Fields tried funding measures that resulted in raising the city's bonded indebtedness and the property tax rate. More businesses closed as workers left the area to seek jobs in other regions. The more established white workers had an easier time gaining jobs in other localities, and the city population became increasingly Black. Contaminated brownfield sites were expensive and difficult to redevelop.

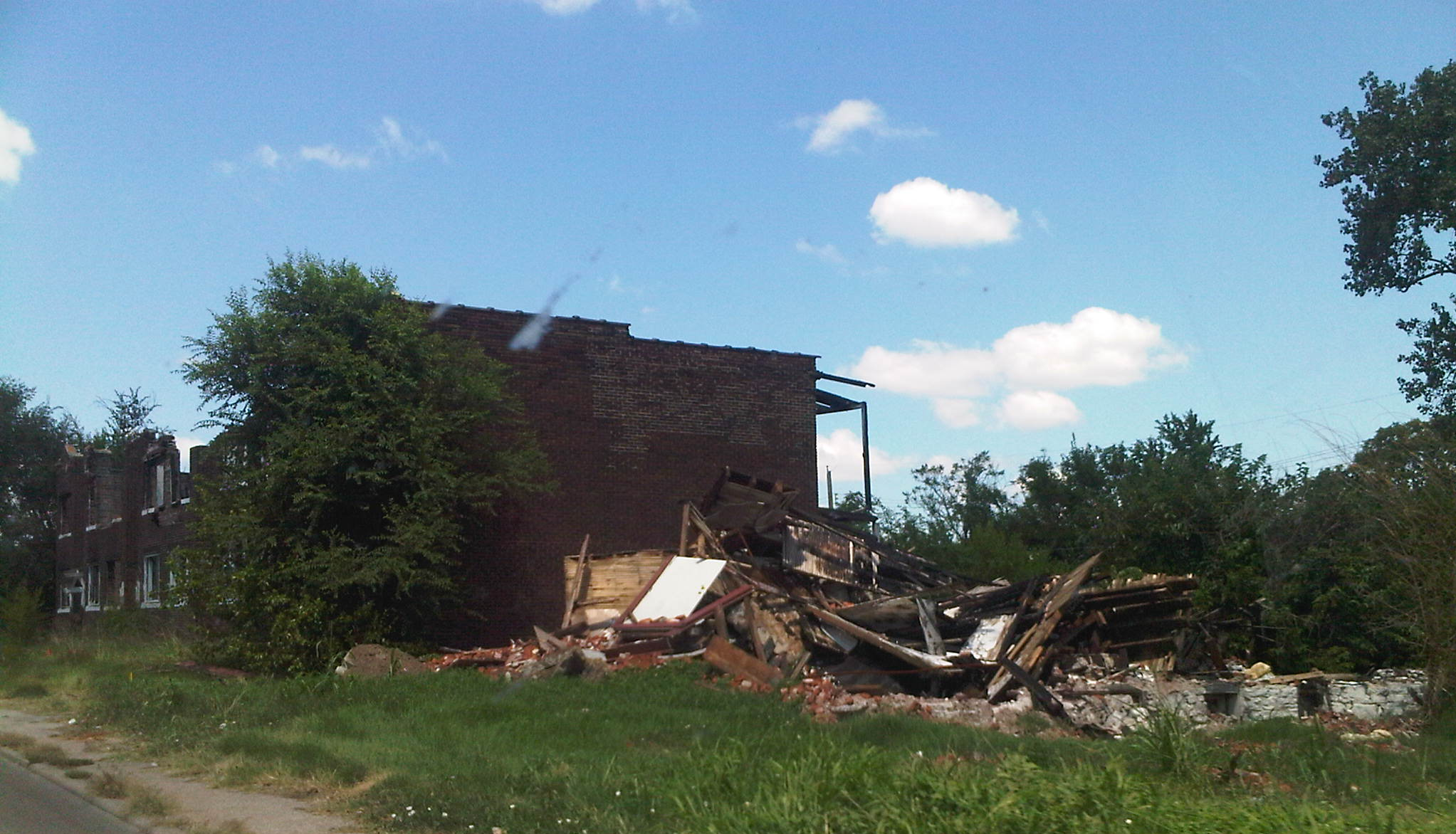
Urban blight in East St. Louis

Street gangs appeared in city neighborhoods. Like other cities with endemic problems by the 1960s, violence added to residential mistrust and adversely affected the downtown retail base and the city's income.

The construction of freeways also contributed to East St. Louis's decline. They were constructed through and broke up functioning neighborhoods and community networks, adding to the social disruption of the period. The freeways made it easier for residents to commute back and forth from suburban homes, so wealthier people moved out to newer housing. East St. Louis adopted a number of programs to try to reverse decline—the Model Cities program, the Concentrated Employment Program, and Operation Breakthrough—but they did not offset the loss of industrial jobs due to national restructuring.

In 1971, James E. Williams was elected as the city's first black mayor. He was unable to do much about the overwhelming economic problems. In 1975, William E. Mason was elected mayor; his term marked a return to patronage politics, and the city sank deeper into debt and reliance on federal funding. In 1979, Carl Officer was elected mayor (the youngest in the country at that time, at age 25). Despite hopes for improvement, conditions continued to decline. Middle-class citizens continued to leave the city. People who could get jobs moved to places with work and a decent quality of life. Lacking sufficient tax revenue, the city cut back on maintenance, sewers failed, and garbage pickup ceased. Police cars and radios stopped working. The East St. Louis Fire Department went on strike in the 1970s.

Structure fires destroyed so many consecutive blocks that much of the post-Armageddon film Escape from New York was filmed in East St. Louis.

In 1990, the State of Illinois passed (65 ILCS 5/Art. 8 Div. 12) The Financially Distressed City Law. Under this law, Governor James R. Thompson provided $34 million in loans to East St. Louis, with the stipulation that an appointed five-member board, the East St. Louis Financial Advisory Authority, manage the city's finances. In 1990 the state legislature approved riverboat gambling in an effort to increase state revenue. The opening of the Casino Queen riverboat casino generated the city's first new source of income in nearly 30 years.

In 1991, Gordon Bush was elected mayor. Several major industries operating in the area had gained separate incorporation as jurisdictions for the land where their plants are sited. These "communities" have virtually no residents, and the shell jurisdictions are outside East St. Louis's tax base (see Sauget, Illinois), but residents of the city suffer from contaminated air and other adverse environmental effects of these sites. At the same time, the city's tax base is too poor for it to maintain its infrastructure, including the sanitary sewers, many of which have broken and overflowed in residential neighborhoods and schools.

In 1994, the Gateway Geyser was added to the city's waterfront, facing the St. Louis Arch. On the grounds of Malcolm W. Martin Memorial Park, it was the world's second-tallest fountain. Designed to complement the Gateway Arch in St. Louis, it shot water to a height of 630 feet (190 m), the same height as the Arch. The geyser was closed in 2023 due to costs of refurbishment and to prepare the park for being handed over to the National Park Service as an extension of the Gateway memorial.

=== 21st century ===
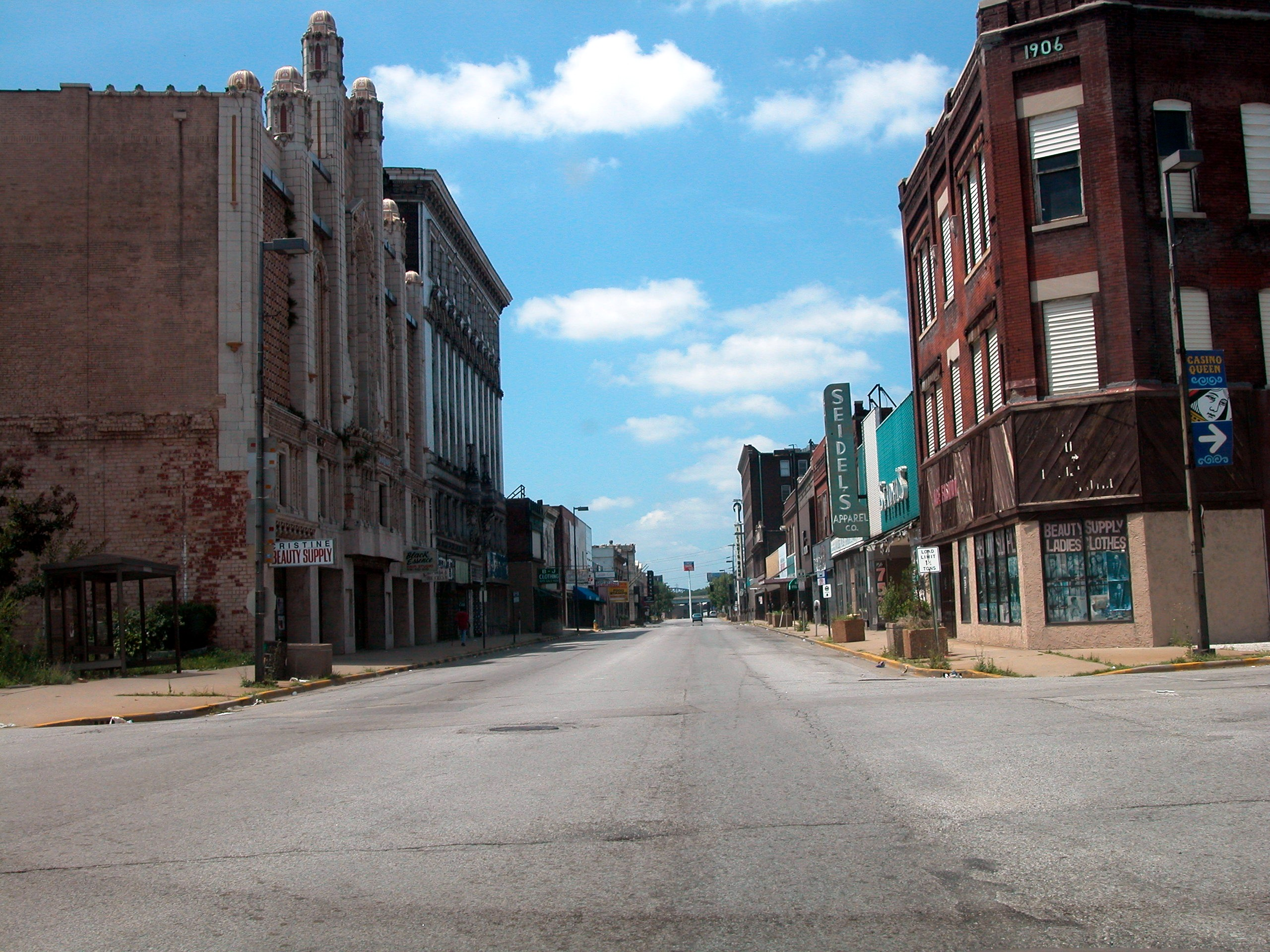
Downtown East St. Louis Historic District in 2003, with Majestic Theatre at left

Since 2000, the city has completed several redevelopment projects: in 2001, it opened a new library and built a new city hall. Public-private partnerships have resulted in a variety of new retail developments and housing initiatives. The St. Louis MetroLink light rail connects the city by transit to St. Louis, which has a stronger economy, and such efforts have sparked renewal.

Because of depopulation, the city has many abandoned properties and extensive urban blight. Sections of "urban prairie" can be found where vacant buildings were demolished, and whole blocks have become overgrown with vegetation. Much of the territory surrounding the city remains undeveloped, bypassed by developers who chose more affluent suburban areas. Many old "inner city" neighborhoods abut large swaths of corn and soybean fields or otherwise vacant land. In addition to agricultural uses, several truck stops, strip clubs, and semi-rural businesses surround blighted areas in the city.

In 2010, the East St. Louis community gardening movement began to develop plots for "urban farming", as was done in North St. Louis. Inspired by Detroit's planned use of vacant land for green development, community associations, nonprofits and universities have collaborated to spark green development in East St. Louis.

As of 2023, about 2,200 people, or 12% of the population live in public housing owned by the East St. Louis Housing Authority. All these residents make less than $9,000 per year, meaning the Authority is highly dependent upon state and federal funding to continue operating its aging housing stock.

=== Archeological remains ===
In the early 1990s, archeological surveys and excavations prior to the construction of Interstate 55/70 revealed evidence of important prehistoric structures in the East St. Louis area. Both sides of the river had earlier been reported as having numerous earthwork mounds when Europeans and Americans first settled in the area. Unfortunately, most of these cultural treasures in St. Louis and on the east side were lost to development.

Illinois researchers discovered the remains of several earthwork mounds. In the East St. Louis area, 50 mounds had been mapped before the Civil War, and seven remain visible today. The largest is estimated to have been originally 40 feet (12 m) high and would have nearly covered a football field. Around the remains of this mound, researchers have discovered evidence of burial mounds, a large plaza, a wooden defensive palisade, and several other Mississippian culture structures. These indicate that it was a ritual center. The 500-acre (200 ha) prehistoric site is now called the East St. Louis Mound Center. The state and University of Illinois are trying to develop coordinated projects with East St. Louis and businesses to use the mounds and artifacts as attractions for heritage tourism.

It was built by the Mississippian culture, which extended throughout the Ohio and Mississippi valleys. It reached its peak in this region about AD 1100–1200 at the nearby major center of Cahokia, a designated UNESCO World Heritage Site within the present-day boundaries of Collinsville. A complex urban center estimated to have had a population of perhaps 20,000, this site is about 5 miles (8 km) from East St. Louis.

In 2012, archeological work prior to construction of the Stan Musial Bridge across the Mississippi discovered artifacts and evidence of a formerly unidentified 900-year-old suburb of Cahokia in present-day East St. Louis. This site had not been mapped in the 19th century, and was unknown. The Mississippian culture site is in a present industrial wasteland. Researchers found evidence of more than 1,000 dwellings and the base of an earthen pyramidal mound. It would have been one of dozens of mounds when the community was active, based on the size of the residential population of this site. The discovery of the site led scholars to increase their estimates of the total population of the Mississippians at Cahokia and in the area, now thought to have been about 20,000. They did not have the time to excavate the entire area. It is on private land and subject to risk of destruction by development.

== Geography ==
East St. Louis township

East St. Louis is located at 38°37′N 90°8′W (38.616, −90.133).

According to the 2010 census, East St. Louis has an area of 14.37 square miles (37.22 km^{2}), of which 13.99 square miles (36.23 km^{2}), or 97.36%, is land and 0.38 square miles (0.98 km^{2}), or 2.64%, is water.

=== Climate ===
East St. Louis, like all of Southern Illinois, is classified as humid subtropical by the Köppen classification, having hot, humid summers and cool winters. On July 14, 1954, the temperature in East St. Louis allegedly reached 117 °F (47 °C), the highest temperature ever recorded in America east of the Mississippi River. It is not considered a formal record as the city had no weather station.

== Demographics ==
Historical population
Census	Pop.	Note	%±
1870	5,044		—
1880	9,185		82.1%
1890	15,169		65.1%
1900	29,734		96.0%
1910	58,540		96.9%
1920	66,785		14.1%
1930	74,397		11.4%
1940	75,603		1.6%
1950	82,366		8.9%
1960	81,728		−0.8%
1970	70,029		−14.3%
1980	55,239		−21.1%
1990	40,944		−25.9%
2000	31,542		−23.0%
2010	27,006		−14.4%
2020	18,469		−31.6%
2023 (est.)	17,642		−4.5%
U.S. Decennial Census; 2010 2020

=== Racial and ethnic composition ===
East St. Louis city, Illinois – Racial and ethnic composition Note: the US Census treats Hispanic/Latino as an ethnic category. This table excludes Latinos from the racial categories and assigns them to a separate category. Hispanics/Latinos may be of any race.
Race / Ethnicity (NH = Non-Hispanic)	Pop 1990	Pop 2000	Pop 2010	Pop 2020	% 1990	% 2000	% 2010	% 2020
White alone (NH)	641	363	219	222	1.57%	1.15%	0.81%	1.20%
Black or African American alone (NH)	40,061	30,702	26,378	17,536	97.84%	97.34%	97.67%	94.95%
Native American or Alaska Native alone (NH)	46	49	22	30	0.11%	0.16%	0.08%	0.16%
Asian alone (NH)	21	24	24	15	0.05%	0.08%	0.09%	0.08%
Native Hawaiian or Pacific Islander alone (NH)	N/A	9	3	3	N/A	0.03%	0.01%	0.02%
Other race alone (NH)	16	10	19	52	0.04%	0.03%	0.07%	0.28%
Mixed race or Multiracial (NH)	N/A	155	208	442	N/A	0.49%	0.77%	2.39%
Hispanic or Latino (any race)	159	230	133	169	0.39%	0.73%	0.49%	0.92%
Total	40,944	31,542	27,006	18,469	100.00%	100.00%	100.00%	100.00%

=== 2020 census ===
As of the 2020 census, East St. Louis had a population of 18,469. The median age was 39.6 years. 25.1% of residents were under the age of 18 and 18.6% of residents were 65 years of age or older. For every 100 females there were 84.0 males, and for every 100 females age 18 and over there were 79.3 males age 18 and over.

100.0% of residents lived in urban areas, while 0.0% lived in rural areas.

There were 7,611 households in East St. Louis, of which 28.2% had children under the age of 18 living in them. Of all households, 14.6% were married-couple households, 26.2% were households with a male householder and no spouse or partner present, and 53.1% were households with a female householder and no spouse or partner present. About 38.6% of all households were made up of individuals and 16.3% had someone living alone who was 65 years of age or older.

There were 9,298 housing units, of which 18.1% were vacant. The homeowner vacancy rate was 2.2% and the rental vacancy rate was 13.4%.

Racial composition as of the 2020 census
Race	Number	Percent
White	231	1.3%
Black or African American	17,596	95.3%
American Indian and Alaska Native	34	0.2%
Asian	20	0.1%
Native Hawaiian and Other Pacific Islander	3	0.0%
Some other race	85	0.5%
Two or more races	500	2.7%

=== 2000 census ===
As of the census of 2000, there were 31,542 people, 11,178 households, and 7,668 families residing in the city. The population density was 2,242.9 inhabitants per square mile (866.0/km^{2}). There were 12,899 housing units at an average density of 917.2 per square mile (354.1/km^{2}). The racial makeup of the city was 97.74% Black or African-American, 1.23% White, 0.19% Native American, 0.08% Asian-American, 0.03% Pacific Islander, 0.19% from other races, and 0.55% from two or more races. Hispanic or Latino of any race were 0.73% of the population.

There were 11,178 households, out of which 33.2% had children under the age of 18 living with them, 21.9% were married couples living together, 40.6% had a female householder with no husband present, and 31.4% were non-families. 27.8% of all households were made up of individuals, and 10.4% had someone living alone who was 65 years of age or older. The average household size was 3.80 and the average family size was 4.02.

In the city, the population was spread out, with 32.8% under the age of 18, 9.7% from 18 to 24, 24.6% from 25 to 44, 20.3% from 45 to 64, and 12.5% who were 65 years of age or older. The median age was 31 years. For every 100 females, there were 81.5 males. For every 100 females age 18 and over, there were 72.5 males.

The median income for a household in the city was $21,324, and the median income for a family was $24,567. Males had a median income of $27,864 versus $21,850 for females. The per capita income for the city was $11,169. About 31.8% of families and 35.1% of the population were below the poverty line, including 48.6% of those under the age of 18 and 25.2% of those ages 65 and older.

=== Crime ===
A 2007 study in the journal Homicide Studies reported, "East St. Louis has consistently experienced a high violent crime rate and continues to report a substantial number of annual homicides." In 2013, East St. Louis's per capita homicide rate was about 18 times the national average, and it had the highest homicide rate of any U.S. city.

According to the FBI Uniform Crime Reports, in 2015 East St. Louis (with a population of 26,616), had 19 cases of murder and non-negligent manslaughter, 42 cases of rape, 146 cases of robbery, 682 cases of aggravated assault, and 12 cases of arson. In 2016, NeighborhoodScout released rankings indicating that East St. Louis had the highest murder rate of any U.S. city.

East St. Louis has also been the location of two killer duos: Girvies Davis and Richard Holman, serial killers who killed four people during armed robberies in 1978 and 1979; and Andre Jones and Freddie Tiller, serial and spree killers responsible for eight murders between 1971 and 1979.

== Government ==
The city is governed by an elected mayor and city council.

=== Mayors ===
Mayors of East St. Louis, Illinois

Mayor	Years	Notes
John B. Bowman	1865–1866	
John B. Lovington	1867	
John B. Bowman	1868	
Vital Jarrot	1869–1870	
Dennis Ryan	1871–1872	Died in office.
John B. Bowman	1872–1874	
Samuel S. Hake	1875–1876	
John B. Bowman	1877–1878	
Maurice Joyce	1879–1880	
John J. McLean	1881–1882	
O. R. Winton	1883–1884	
Maurice Joyce	1885–1886	
Melbern M. Stephens	1887–1895	
Henry F. Bader	1895–1897	
Melbern M. Stephens	1897–1903	
Silas Cook	1903–1911	
Charles S. Lambert	1911–1913	
John Chamberlin	1913–1915	
Frank Mollman	1915–1919	
Melbern M. Stephens	1919–1927	
Frank Doyle	1927–1933	Died in office.
James T. Crow	1933–1939	
John T. Connors	1939–1951	
Alvin G. Fields	1951–1971	
James E. Williams	1971–1975	First African-American mayor.
William E. Mason	1975–1979	
Carl E. Officer	1979–1991	
Gordon D. Bush	1991–1999	
Debra A. Powell	1999–2003	First woman mayor.
Carl E. Officer	2003–2007	
Alvin Parks Jr.	2007–2015	
Emeka Jackson-Hicks	2015–2019	
Robert Eastern III	2019–2023	
Charles Powell III	2023–Present	

Several social services organizations operate in East St. Louis, including Lessie Bates Davis Neighborhood House, Catholic Urban Programs, Christian Activity Center, and The Delta Childcare Center of Delta Sigma Theta sorority, East St. Louis Alumnae Chapter, and The Jackie Joyner-Kersee Foundation.

The Southwestern Illinois Correctional Center, operated by the Illinois Department of Corrections, is located near East St. Louis and provides some jobs.

=== Fire department ===
East St. Louis is protected by 31 paid, professional firefighters. They are organized into three divisions of operations: Administration, Firefighting/Hazard Mitigation, and Fire Prevention/Arson Investigation. The department operates from three fire stations in the city: Engine 422 at 17th St. and Lincoln Ave., Engine 425 and Ladder 419 at 17th St. and Central Ave., and Engine 426 at 72nd St. and State St. The Chief of Department is Jason Blackmon.

The East St. Louis Fire Department has struggled to provide protection and service while undergoing repeated budget cuts. It laid off 22 firefighters in May 2013. According to a National Fire Report, approximately 49 percent of all emergency calls the East St. Louis Fire Department responds to are structural fires.

== Education ==
The city is served by East St. Louis School District 189. As of 2017, the district operates an early childhood learning center, 5 elementary schools, 2 middle schools, and one high school, East St. Louis High School. Until 1998, East St. Louis Lincoln High School also served portions of the city.

There are two private K–8 schools in East St. Louis: Sister Thea Bowman Catholic School and Unity Lutheran Christian Elementary School. Sister Thea Bowman Catholic School is operated under the Roman Catholic Diocese of Belleville. There were previously four Catholic elementary schools: St. Joseph, St. Martin of Tours, St. Patrick, St. Philip, Holy Angels and St. Adalbert. In 1989 they consolidated at the St. Philip location as Bowman.

Starting in 1894, St. Teresa Academy was established by the Sisters of the Most Precious Blood, as a high school for young women. The school closed in 1974.

In 1929 Central Catholic High School for Boys was established with the name being changed to Assumption High School in 1953. Women were welcomed to Assumption in 1974 after St. Teresa Academy closed. Later, Assumption closed in 1989.

== Media ==
One television station is licensed to, but does not operate from, the city: Ion Television affiliate WRBU (Channel 46), which serves the entire St. Louis market. In the past, it served as St. Louis's UPN and MyNetworkTV affiliate. On FM, sports station WXOS (101.1) and non-commercial Contemporary Christian music station WCBW (89.7) are licensed to East St. Louis.

The Metro-East Journal, originally the East St. Louis Journal, was published in the city from 1888 to 1979. The East St. Louis Monitor was a newspaper published from 1963 to 2024.

== Transportation ==
East St. Louis has five St. Louis MetroLink stations: East Riverfront, 5th & Missouri, Emerson Park, JJK Center, and Washington Park.

Interstate 55, Interstate 64, Interstate 70, and U.S. Route 40 run through East St. Louis and are linked to St. Louis by the Poplar Street Bridge and Stan Musial Bridge. Before it was decommissioned, the fabled U.S. Route 66 also shared a concurrency with these Interstate highways. U.S. Route 50 also shared a concurrency before it was rerouted to run concurrently with Interstate 255.

The closest airport is the St. Louis Downtown Airport, in Cahokia, Illinois, just south of East St. Louis.

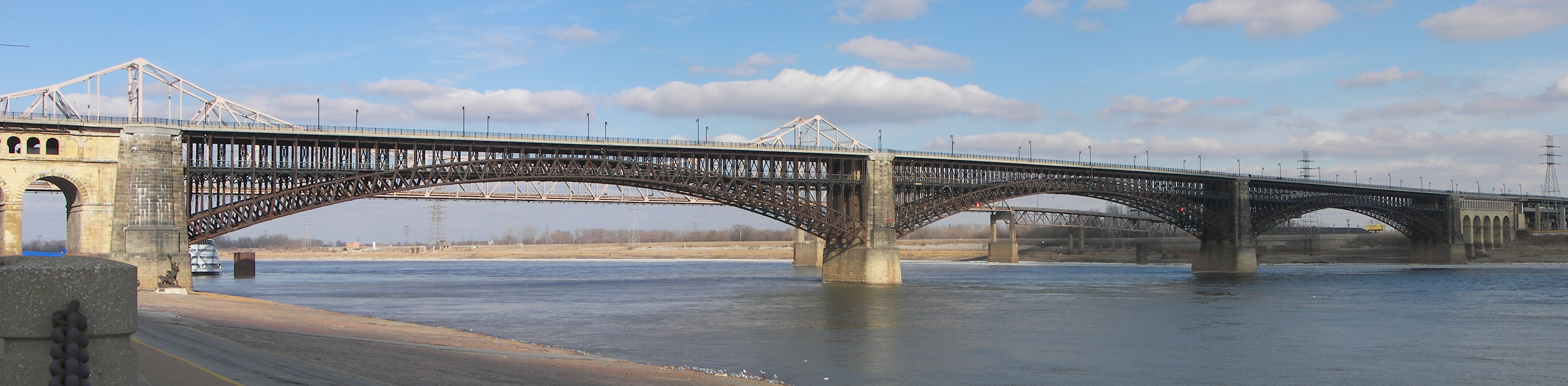
The Eads Bridge from the St. Louis side of the river, looking into East St. Louis

== Other sources ==
- Heaps, Willard Allison. "Target of Prejudice: The Negro". Riots, U.S.A., 1765–1970. New York: The Seabury Press, 1970. 108–117.
- Kozol, Jonathan. "Life on the Mississippi". Savage Inequalities: Children in America's Schools. Crown, 1991. 7–39. ISBN 0-517-58221-X
- "Race Rioters Fire East St. Louis and Shoot or Hang Many Negroes; Dead Estimated at from 20 to 76". The New York Times, July 3, 1917.
