= History of Washington University in St. Louis =

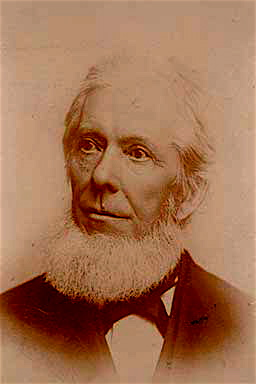
William Greenleaf Eliot, first president of the Board of Trustees

Washington University's origins were in seventeen St. Louis business, political, and religious leaders concerned by the lack of institutions of higher learning in the Midwest. The effort to found the university was spearheaded by Missouri State Senator Wayman Crow, and Unitarian minister William Greenleaf Eliot, grandfather of the Nobel Prize laureate poet T. S. Eliot. Its first chancellor was Joseph Gibson Hoyt. Crow secured the university charter from the Missouri State Legislature in 1853 and handled further political maneuvering. While Eliot was in charge of raising funds for the university, he accepted the position as President of the Board of Trustees. Early on Eliot was able to solicit some support from the local business community, including John O'Fallon, one of the wealthiest people in St. Louis, even briefly considering naming the university the O'Fallon Institute. However, Eliot failed in securing a permanent endowment. In fact Wash U is unique among other American universities, in not having any prior financial endowment to begin with; the school had no religious backing, wealthy patron, or government support. Therefore, financial problems plagued the university for several decades after its founding.

The name of the university was still unclear; in the three years following its inspection the university bore three different names. The board first approved Eliot Seminary but this title was eventually replaced in favor of the Washington Institute, because of William Eliot's stiff opposition to the name. Not only was Eliot personally uncomfortable with the idea of naming a university after himself, but he also objected to the establishment of a seminary which would inherently be charged with teaching a religious faith, in favor of a purely non-sectarian university. Under pressure from Eliot, the Board of Trustees created a task force charged with naming the university, headed by Samuel Treat. Several months later Treat's committee proposed naming the University the Washington Institute, after the nation's first president George Washington. However, in the midst of finance problems the Board of Trustees, voted to name the university the O'Fallon Institute in order to secure funds from John O'Fallon, the wealthiest individual in St. Louis. Treat felt the name was unsuitable and persuaded the board to drop the name in favor of the Washington Institute. Naming the university after the nation's first president only six years before the American Civil War during a time of bitter national division was no coincidence on the part of Treat. George Washington was universally admired by Americans and hailed as the father of America, and the country's greatest president. Treat felt that the university should be a force of unity in a strongly the divided Missouri. In 1856 the university amended its name to Washington University. The university's only amended its name once more in 1976 when the board of trustees voted to add the suffix in St. Louis to distinguish the university from the nearly two dozen universities bearing Washington's name.

Although sanctioned as a university, Washington University functioned primarily as a night school located on 17th Street and Washington Avenue, in the heart of the bustling St. Louis Downtown. Once again plagued by the lack of resources, the university was forced to use public buildings. Classes began on October 22, 1854, at the Benton School building. At first the university paid for the evening classes, but as their popularity grew, the bill was transferred to the St. Louis public schools. Eventually the board was able to secure funds for the construction of Academic Hall and a half dozen other buildings. Later the university divided into three departments; the Manual Training School, Smith Academy, and the Mary Institute.

In 1867 the university opened the first private non-sectarian law school west of the Mississippi River. The law school was the first undergraduate division of the university to admit women and is believed to have been among the first law schools in the United States to do so. In 1869, Lemma Barkeloo and Phoebe Couzins enrolled. Barkeloo passed the Missouri bar examination during her first year and did not complete the program. Couzins continued her studies and became one of the first women in the country to earn a law degree, receiving her LL.B. in 1871. The inclusion of women did not become a consistent practice until 17 years later. The law school was advertised as The St. Louis Law School.

In 1874, the general assembly granted diploma privilege to the university. When the legislature reintroduced a bar exam for all candidates in 1879, the law school catalog emphasized that the courts had ruled the diploma privilege still applied despite the new law.

The Museum of Fine Arts, located at Locust and Nineteenth, was established in 1881. Crow donated the museum to both the university and the people of St. Louis as a memorial to his son.

By 1882 the university had expanded to numerous departments, housed in buildings spread across downtown St. Louis. However, by the 1890s, the university was on the brink of financial collapse, until Robert Sommers Brookings, president of the Board of Trustees, undertook the task of rebuilding the universities finances, and acquiring land for a new campus. Brookings was instrumental in raising money for the university, since Eliot, the primary fundraiser for the university, had died.

== Modern era ==
Washington University spent its first half century in downtown St. Louis bound by Washington Ave., Lucas Place, and Locust Street. By the 1890s, due to the dramatic expansion of the Manual School, and a new benefactor in Robert Brookings, the university began to move west. The university Board of Directors began a process to find suitable ground, and hired the architecture firm Olmsted, Olmsted & Eliot of Boston. A committee of Robert S. Brookings, Henry Ware Eliot, and William Huse found a site of 103 acres (0.42 km^{2}) just beyond Forest Park, located west of the city limits in St. Louis County. The elevation of the land was thought to resemble the Acropolis and inspired the nickname of "Hilltop" campus, renamed the Danforth campus in 2006 to honor former chancellor William "Bill" H. Danforth. In 1899 the university opened a design contest for the new campus. A plan for a row of quadrangles, submitted by Cope & Stewardson Philadelphia, won unanimously. The cornerstone of the first building, Busch Hall, was laid on October 20, 1900. Construction on Brookings Hall and other buildings began shortly thereafter. To solve financial problems, the new buildings were leased as the headquarters of the Louisiana Purchase Exposition (also known as the 1904 St. Louis World's Fair). Academic use of the new site began immediately after the Fair with services in the chapel on January 30, 1905. The delay caused by the Fair allowed the university to construct ten buildings instead of the seven originally planned.

Washington University ended racial segregation in its undergraduate divisions in 1952, making it the last of the city's major colleges and universities to give full admittance to African Americans. During the mid- and late 1940s, the university was the target of critical editorials in the local African American press, letter-writing campaigns by churches and the local Urban League, and legal briefs by the NAACP intended to strip its tax-exempt status. In spring 1949, a Washington University student group, the Student Committee for the Admission of Negroes (SCAN), began campaigning for full racial integration. The administration continued to hold that full desegregation "would place the University outside of the community," as Vice-Chancellor Leslie Buchan claimed in 1951, and could spark "incidents on campus." However, under mounting internal and external pressure, the board of trustees in May 1952 passed a resolution desegregating the school's undergraduate divisions.

== Recent history ==
The campus was the venue for four Presidential debates, and one vice presidential debate: the first 1992 Presidential debate on October 11, 1992, the third 2000 Presidential debate on October 17, 2000, the second 2004 presidential election on October 8, 2004, the 2008 Vice-Presidential debate on October 2, and the second 2016 Presidential debate on October 9, 2016. The university was also scheduled to host a debate in 1996, but that debate was cancelled when the candidates chose not to participate.

In 2002, Washington University co-founded the Cortex Innovation Community in St. Louis's Midtown neighborhood. Cortex is the largest innovation hub in the midwest, home to offices of Square, Microsoft, Aon, Boeing, and Centene. The innovation hub has generated more than 3,800 tech jobs in 14 years.

In the summer of 2002, Brookings Hall Room 300 was transformed into the Mission Control center for Steve Fossett's sixth and ultimately successful attempt to circumnavigate the planet in a balloon—the Spirit of Freedom.

At the start of the fall 2006 semester, the St. Louis Metro opened the Cross–County extension of its light rail MetroLink system. Three of the nine new stations directly serve the University (Skinker, University City-Big Bend, and Forsyth). On July 1, 2006, the university began offering free Metro passes—the U Pass—to all full-time students, faculty, and staff.

In 2019, Washington University unveiled a $360 million campus transformation project known as the "East End Transformation". The transformation project, built on the original 1895 campus plan by Olmsted, Olmsted & Eliot, encompassed 18 acres of the Danforth Campus, adding five new buildings, expanding the university's Mildred Lane Kemper Art Museum, relocating hundreds of surface parking spaces underground, and creating an expansive new park.
