= Maplewood–Manchester station =

Light rail station in St. Louis County, Missouri, US

Maplewood–Manchester
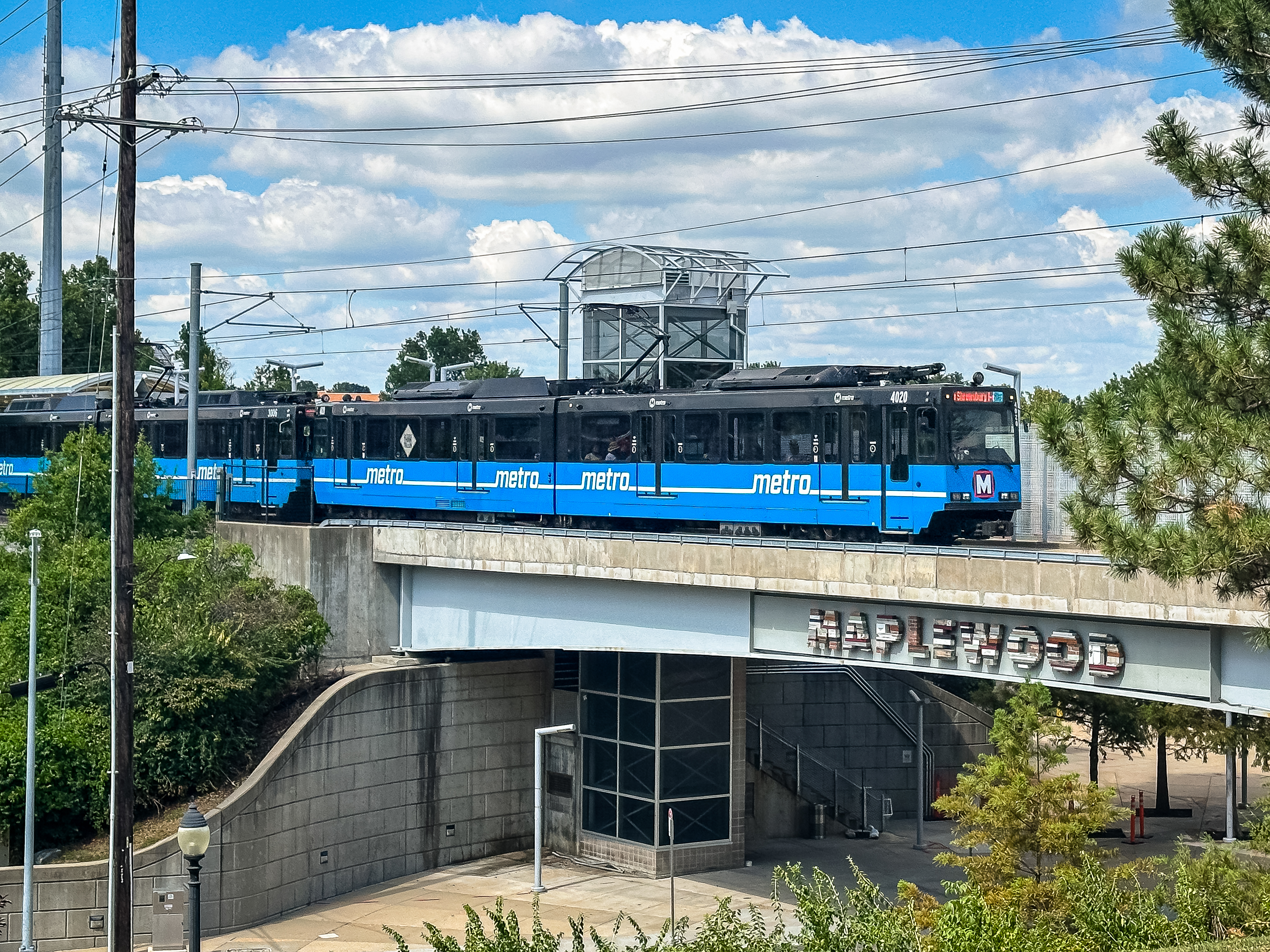
- A westbound train departs Maplewood-Manchester in 2025

General information
- Location: 7911 Manchester Road; Maplewood, Missouri
- Coordinates: 38.614139°N 90.331426°W
- Owner: Bi-State Development
- Operator: Metro Transit
- Platforms: 1 island platform
- Tracks: 2
- Bus stands: 4
- Connections: MetroBus Missouri: 31, 57

Construction
- Structure type: Embankment
- Cycle facilities: Rack
- Accessible: Yes

History
- Opened: August 26, 2006

Passengers
- 2018: 770 daily
- Rank: 22 out of 38

Services
Preceding station	MetroLink	Following station
Sunnen toward Shrewsbury–Lansdowne I-44	Blue Line	Brentwood I-64 toward Fairview Heights
Location

Maplewood–Manchester station is a light rail station on the Blue Line of the St. Louis MetroLink system. This station is located on an embankment near Manchester Road (Route 100) between South Hanley Road and Laclede Station Road in Maplewood, Missouri.

== Station layout ==
The station is accessed by an elevator and stairs on the north side of Manchester Road and stairs on the south side of Manchester. Walkways built along its viaducts connect the station to large industrial and retail facilities to the north and south.

== Bus connections ==
The following MetroBus lines serve Maplewood–Manchester station:

- 31 Chouteau
- 57 Manchester

== Public artwork ==
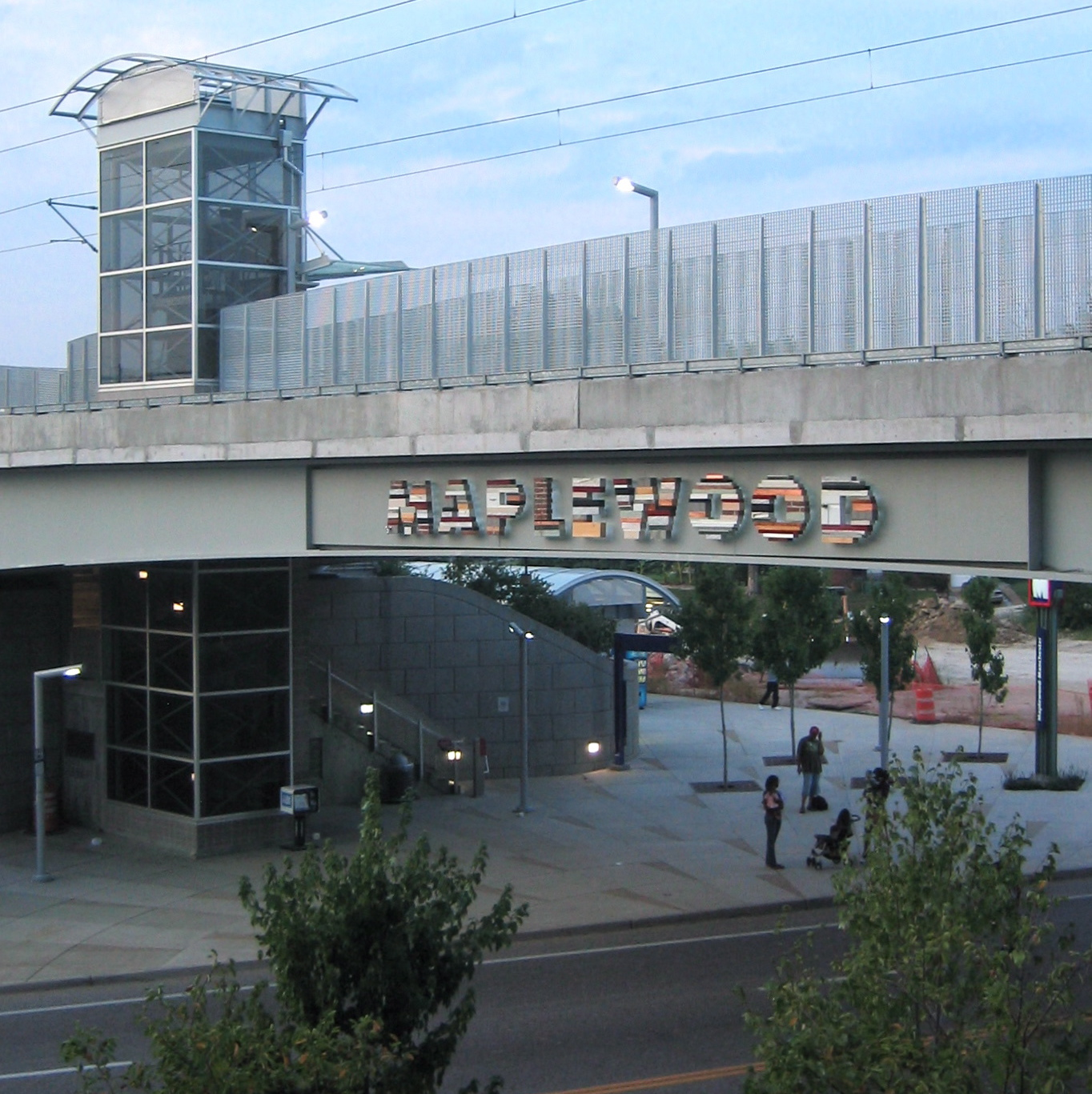
If You Lived Here You’d be Home by Janet Zweig

In 2007, Metro's Arts in Transit program commissioned the work If You Lived Here You’d be Home by Janet Zweig for this station. Two sculptures illuminate both sides of the station viaduct. The artwork seen while entering Maplewood from the west is the word “MAPLEWOOD” written forwards. The letterforms were created from new construction materials, referencing the renovations occurring in Maplewood and the city's future. While leaving Maplewood from the east, commuters will be presented with that same sign; however, it is “reflected” and is constructed of salvaged materials from two local houses that were demolished. This reflected side is meant to remind viewers of Maplewood’s past.

== Notable places nearby ==
- Downtown Maplewood
