= Clayton station =

Light rail station in St. Louis County, Missouri, US

Clayton
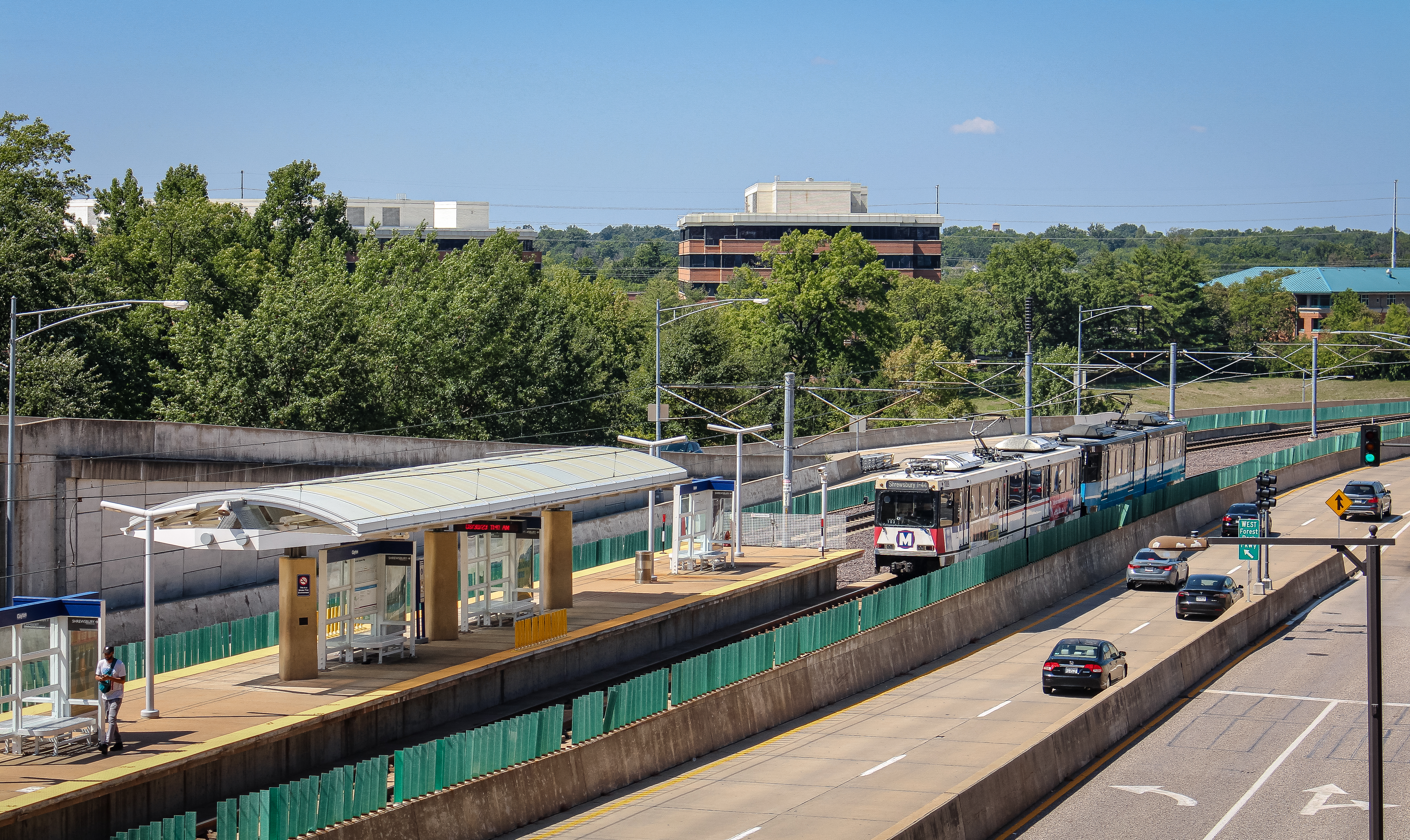
- A Blue Line train departs Clayton in 2023

General information
- Location: 275 South Central Avenue; Clayton, Missouri
- Coordinates: 38.64563°N 90.33996°W
- Owner: Bi-State Development
- Operator: Metro Transit
- Platforms: 1 island platform
- Tracks: 2
- Bus stands: 6
- Connections: MetroBus Missouri: 33, 58, 79, 97

Construction
- Structure type: At-grade
- Parking: 800 paid spaces
- Cycle facilities: Racks
- Accessible: Yes

History
- Opened: August 26, 2006

Passengers
- 2018: 913 daily
- Rank: 18 out of 38

Services
Preceding station	MetroLink	Following station
Richmond Heights toward Shrewsbury–Lansdowne I-44	Blue Line	Forsyth toward Fairview Heights
Location

Clayton station is a light rail station on the Blue Line of the St. Louis MetroLink system. This at-grade station is located in the median of Forest Park Parkway between South Central Avenue and South Meramec Avenue in downtown Clayton.

Public parking is available in the attached county garage. However, this parking is not supplied by Metro, therefore charges may apply.

== Station layout ==
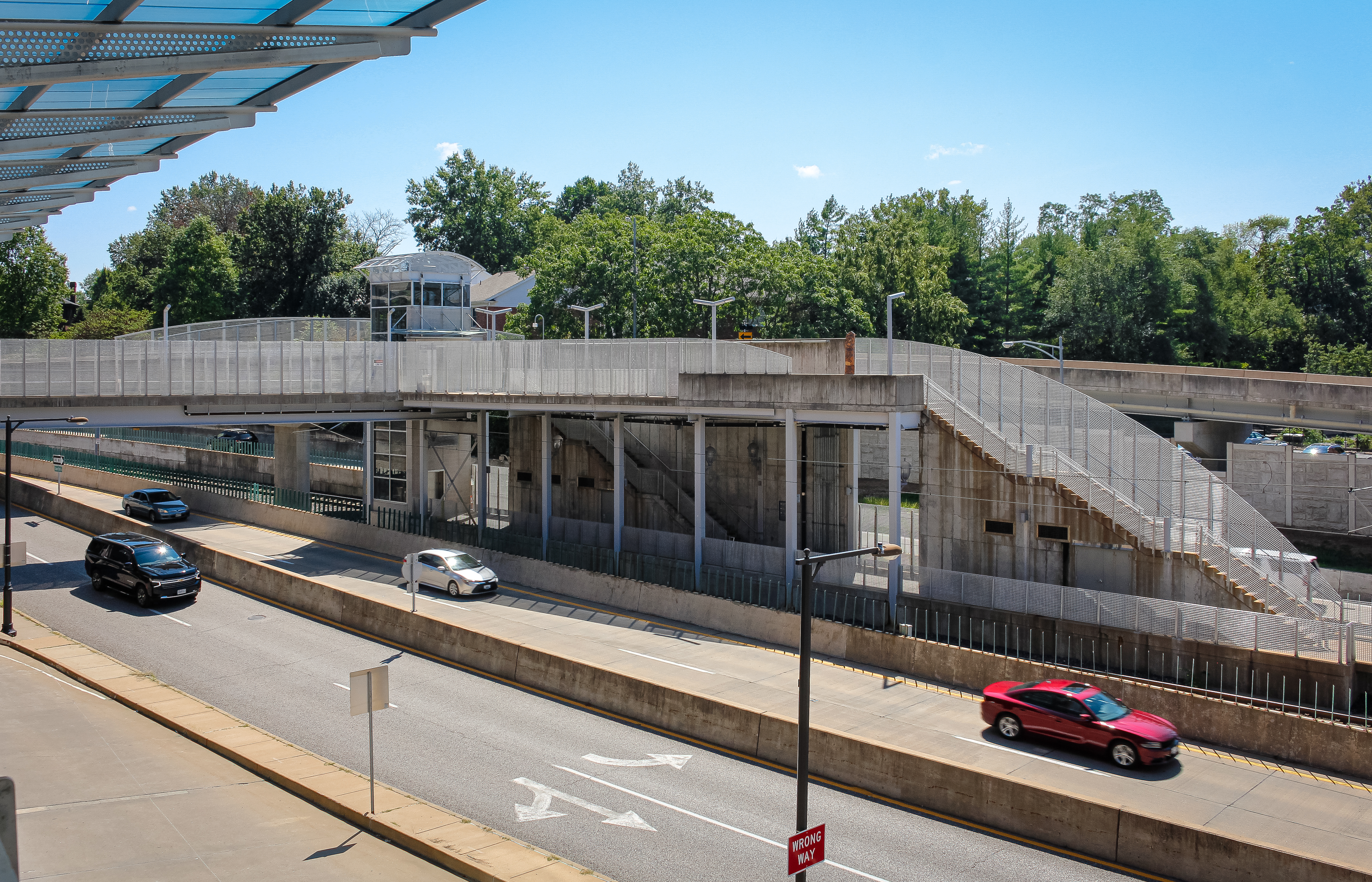
Station access over Forest Park Parkway

The platform is accessed via stairs and an elevator from a pedestrian bridge connected to the adjacent Clayton MetroBus Center and parking garage.

== Bus connections ==
The following MetroBus lines serve the adjacent Clayton MetroBus Center:

- 33 Midland
- 58 Chesterfield Valley
- 79 Ferguson-Clayton
- 97 Delmar

== Public artwork ==
In 2004, Metro's Arts in Transit program commissioned the work Oasis by Catherine Woods for the adjacent MetroBus transfer center. The panels of laminated glass are inspired by the four basic alchemical elements; earth, air, fire, and water. Included in the design is a fifth element based on the idea of good fortune. This concept takes the form of four aluminum panels suspended alongside the glass pieces. They are pierced with abstract silhouettes inspired by symbols of good luck and symbols from Peruvian, Chinese, and African cultures.

In 2008, the Arts in Transit program commissioned a work for the MetroLink station. Titled Grandfather Clocks and created by Carol Fleming, the three glazed ceramic sculptures are reminiscent of the old, regal railroad clocks.

== Notable places nearby ==
- Centennial Greenway
- Downtown Clayton
- Shaw Park
- St. Louis County Government Complex
