= Forest Park–DeBaliviere station =

Light rail station in St. Louis, Missouri, US

Forest Park–DeBaliviere
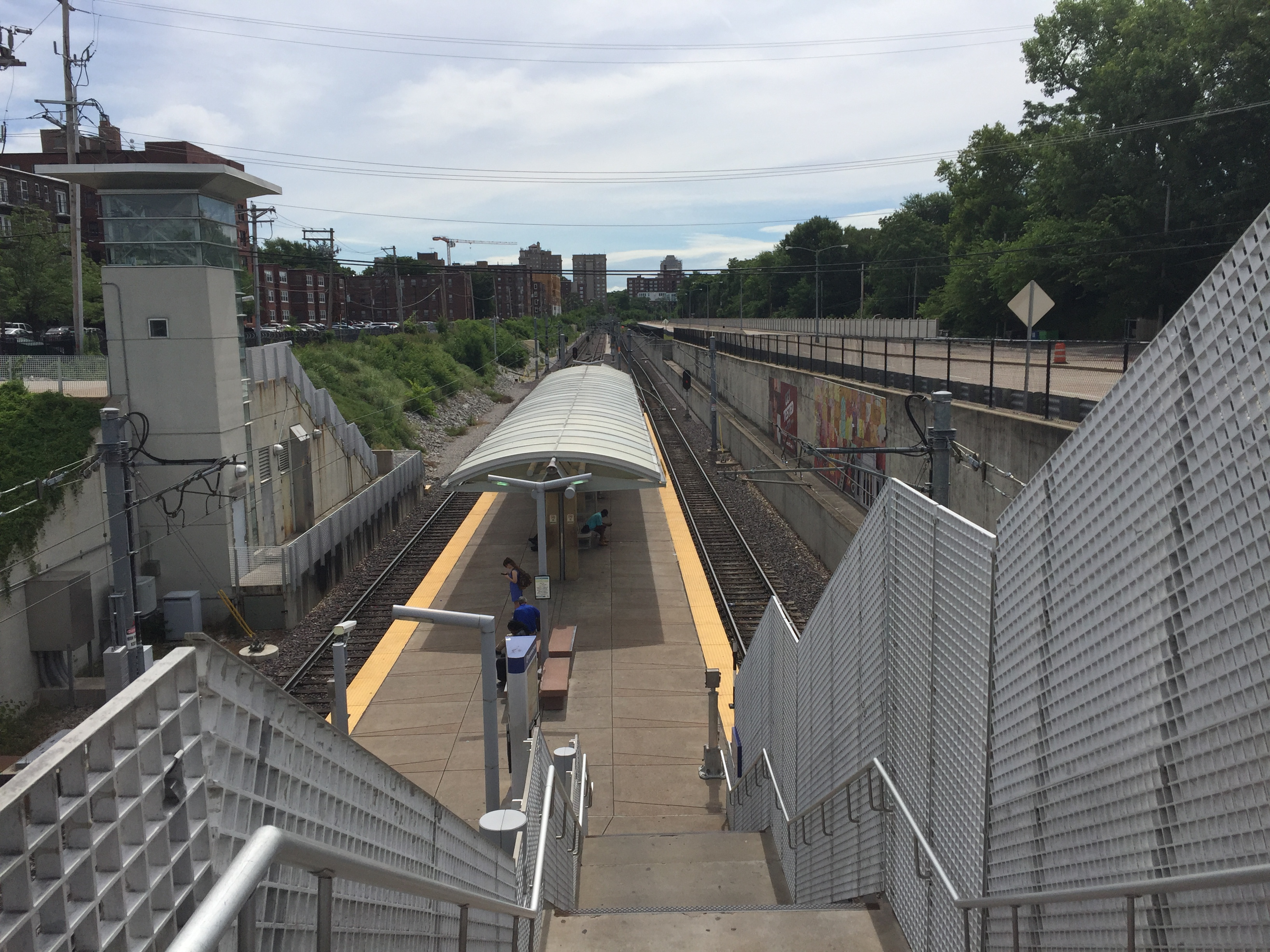
- Forest Park–DeBaliviere platform

General information
- Location: 250 DeBaliviere Avenue; St. Louis, Missouri
- Coordinates: 38.647813°N 90.284689°W
- Owner: Bi-State Development
- Operator: Metro Transit
- Platforms: 1 island platform
- Tracks: 2
- Connections: MetroBus Missouri: 01, 90; Loop Trolley

Construction
- Structure type: Below-grade
- Parking: 115 spaces
- Cycle facilities: Racks, St. Vincent Greenway
- Accessible: Yes

History
- Opened: July 31, 1993
- Rebuilt: 2006
- Former names: Forest Park

Passengers
- 2018: 3,711 daily
- Rank: 2 out of 38

Services
| Preceding station | MetroLink | Following station |
|---|---|---|
| Skinker toward Shrewsbury–Lansdowne I-44 | Blue Line | Central West End toward Fairview Heights |
| Delmar Loop toward Lambert Airport Terminal 1 | Red Line | Central West End toward Shiloh–Scott |
Location

Forest Park–DeBaliviere station is a light rail station on the Red and Blue lines of the St. Louis MetroLink system. This below-grade station is located at the northeast corner of Forest Park Parkway and DeBaliviere Avenue in St. Louis and is designated as the primary transfer point between the two lines.

The Loop Trolley, a seasonally operated heritage streetcar service that travels along DeBaliviere Avenue and Delmar Boulevard, has a stop adjacent to the entrance of the station.

== History ==
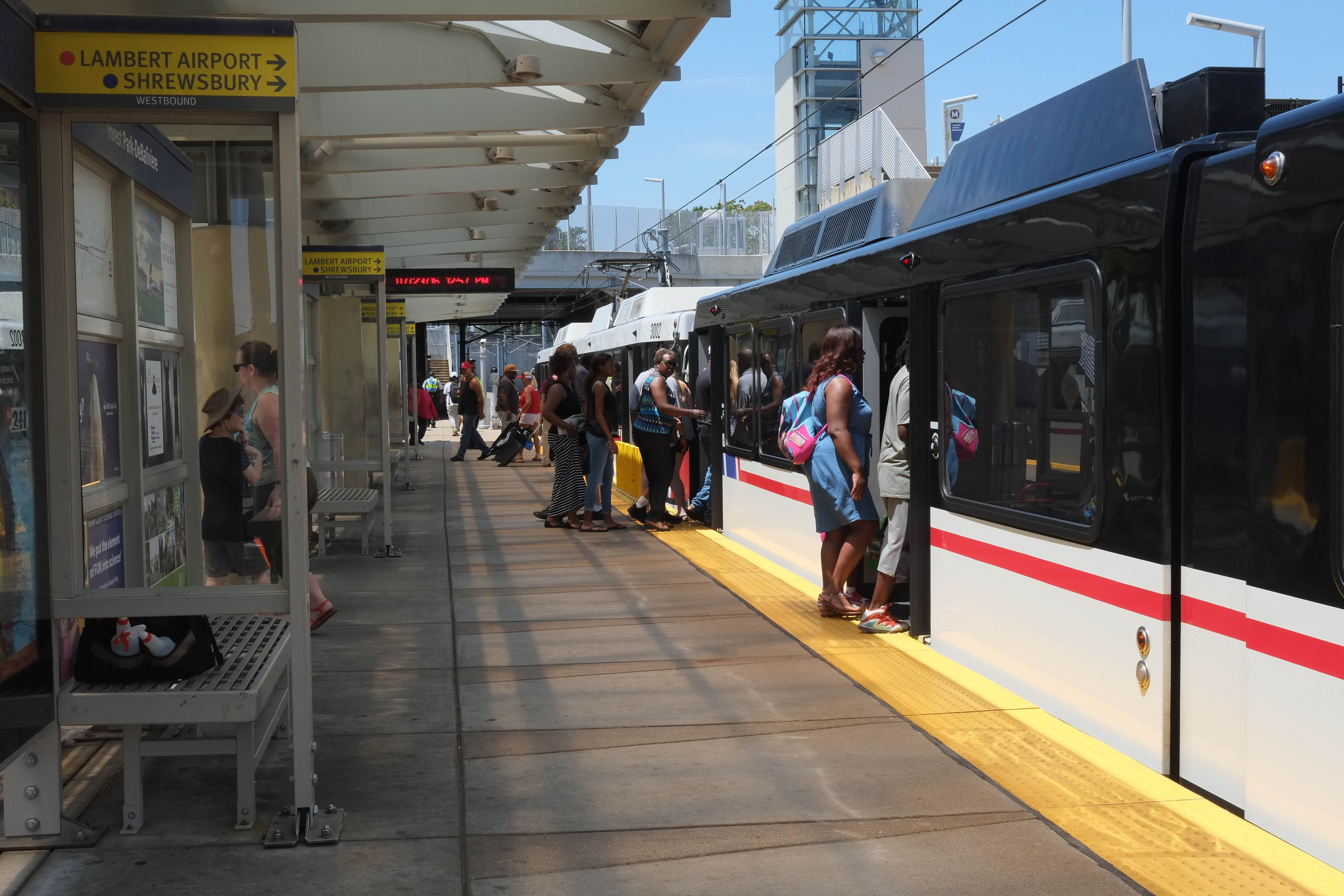
Passengers board a train at Forest Park–DeBaliviere station

The station opened on July 31, 1993, as one of the original MetroLink stations. It was originally constructed with side platforms and a single entrance serving the westbound platform. Access to the eastbound platform required walking the length of the westbound platform and crossing the tracks at the end.

As part of MetroLink's Cross County extension the station was reconstructed with an island platform to allow cross platform transfers between the Red and Blue lines. The entrance was also relocated to DeBaliviere Avenue with an elevator and staircase on both sides of the street. The elevator and staircase from the original westbound platform still exist and are used for maintenance access.

In 2022, two developments opened on the former park and ride lot and strip mall adjacent to the station. One of the largest transit oriented developments in St. Louis to date, the two projects brought 437 new residential units and nearly 40,000 square feet of new commercial space to the area surrounding the station. Included in the garage are 115 free park and ride spaces for Metro customers.

On July 26, 2022, the Forest Park-DeBaliviere station was impacted by a flash flood that shut down MetroLink for nearly 72 hours and caused roughly $40 million in overall damage. Damage at Forest Park-DeBaliviere included both elevators, a communications room and three signal houses. By September, normal Red Line service had resumed while restricted service continued on the Blue Line. On July 31, 2023, Metro received $27.7 million in federal emergency disaster relief funding to help cover the cost of flood damage.

In March 2024, Blue Line platform and speed restrictions were lifted with the last damaged signal house now operational.

== Station layout ==
The platform is accessed via an elevator or set of stairs on either side of DeBaliviere Avenue.

== Public artwork ==
In 2016, Metro's Arts in Transit program commissioned the work Vehicle.Destination.Imagination. by Con Christeson and Catharine Magel for this station. The mural, located along the south retaining wall, combines three-dimensional elements with vibrant colors to celebrate the spirit of the St. Louis region.

In 2022, artist JONUHHM painted a mural depicting several vibrantly colored birds called Better by your side on a wall next to the station's bus turnaround.

== Notable places nearby ==
- Dwight Davis Tennis Center
- Forest Park
- Missouri History Museum
- The Muny
- Saint Louis Art Museum
- Saint Louis Zoo
- St. Vincent Greenway
