= Brentwood I-64 station =

Light rail station in St. Louis County, Missouri, US

Brentwood I-64
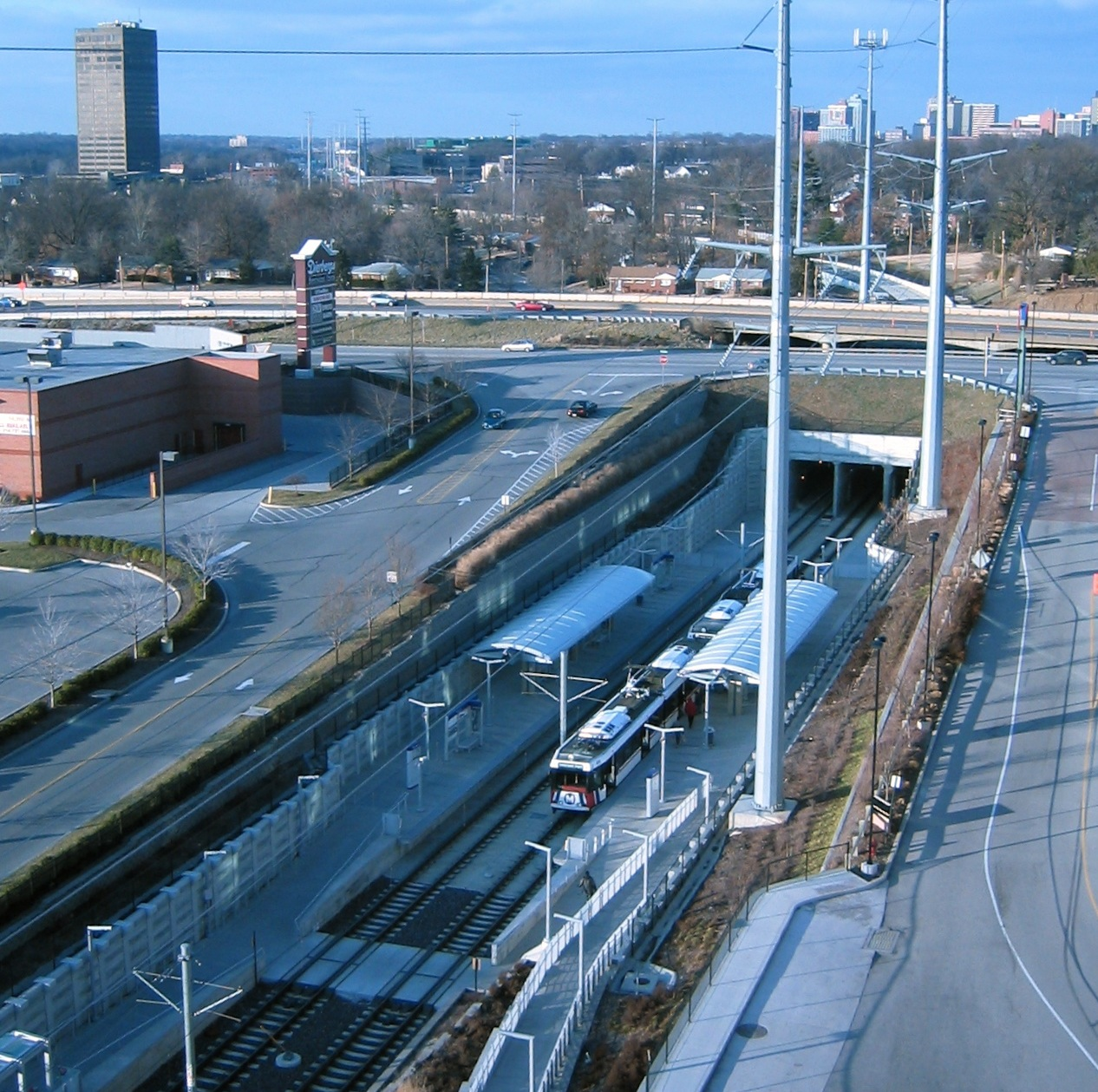
- A westbound Blue Line train at Brentwood I-64

General information
- Location: 8398 Eager Road; Brentwood, Missouri
- Coordinates: 38.628455°N 90.338080°W
- Owner: Bi-State Development
- Operator: Metro Transit
- Platforms: 2 side platforms
- Tracks: 2
- Bus stands: 1
- Connections: MetroBus Missouri: 02, 31

Construction
- Structure type: Below-grade
- Parking: 940 spaces
- Cycle facilities: Rack
- Accessible: Yes

History
- Opened: August 26, 2006

Passengers
- 2018: 916 daily
- Rank: 17 out of 38

Services
Preceding station	MetroLink	Following station
Maplewood–Manchester toward Shrewsbury–Lansdowne I-44	Blue Line	Richmond Heights toward Fairview Heights
Location

Brentwood I-64 station is a light rail station on the Blue Line of the St. Louis MetroLink system. This below-grade station is located near Eager Road in Brentwood, Missouri, just southeast of the Interstate 64/Interstate 170 interchange.

The station includes 918 park and ride spaces and 22 long-term spaces in the neighboring Brentwood Garage. The garage opened on June 12, 2007 and includes a MetroBus transfer, retail spaces, and a fourth floor connection to the Meridian development.

== Station layout ==
The station sits at the south portal of the Eager Road Tunnel and its platforms can be accessed from an entrance on Musick Memorial Drive and two entrances on Hanley Industrial Court.

== Bus connections ==
The following MetroBus lines serve Brentwood I-64 station:

- 02 Red
- 31 Chouteau
