= Sunnen station =

Light rail station in St. Louis County, Missouri, US

Sunnen
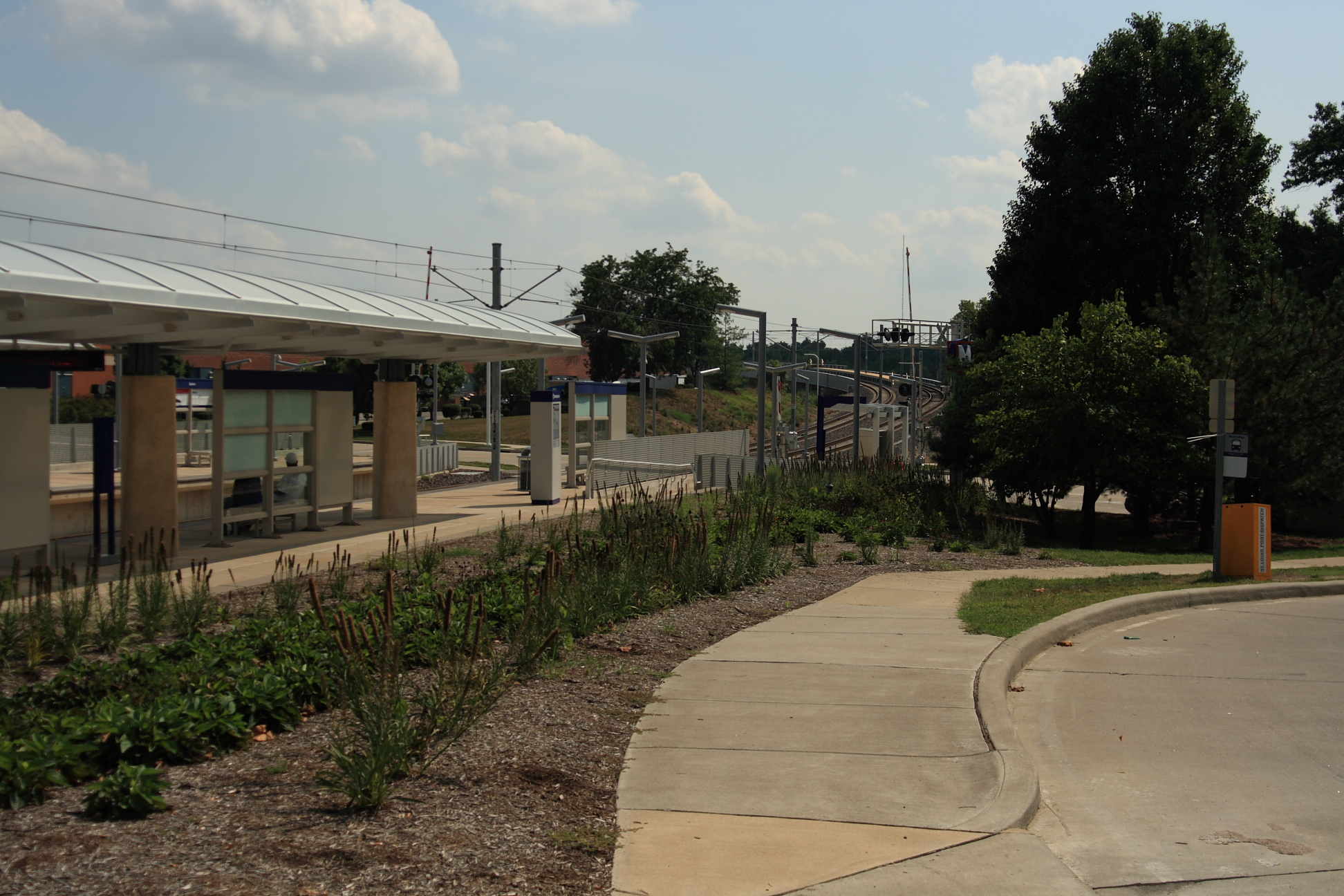
- Sunnen station platform

General information
- Location: 21 Sunnen Drive; Maplewood, Missouri
- Coordinates: 38.607558°N 90.330211°W
- Owner: Bi-State Development
- Operator: Metro Transit
- Platforms: 2 side platforms
- Tracks: 2

Construction
- Structure type: At-grade
- Parking: 96 spaces
- Cycle facilities: Rack
- Accessible: Yes

History
- Opened: August 26, 2006

Passengers
- 2018: 243 daily
- Rank: 38 out of 38

Services
Preceding station	MetroLink	Following station
Shrewsbury–Lansdowne I-44 Terminus	Blue Line	Maplewood–Manchester toward Fairview Heights
Location

Sunnen station is a light rail station on the Blue Line of the St. Louis MetroLink system. This at-grade station is located on Sunnen Drive adjacent to the only level crossing on the Cross County alignment. It is the least used station on the MetroLink system.

The station has a park and ride lot with 96 spaces and includes a kiss-and-ride area.

== Station layout ==
The platforms are accessed by stairs and ramps at each end of the station.
