= University City–Big Bend station =

Light rail station in St. Louis County, Missouri, US

University City–Big Bend
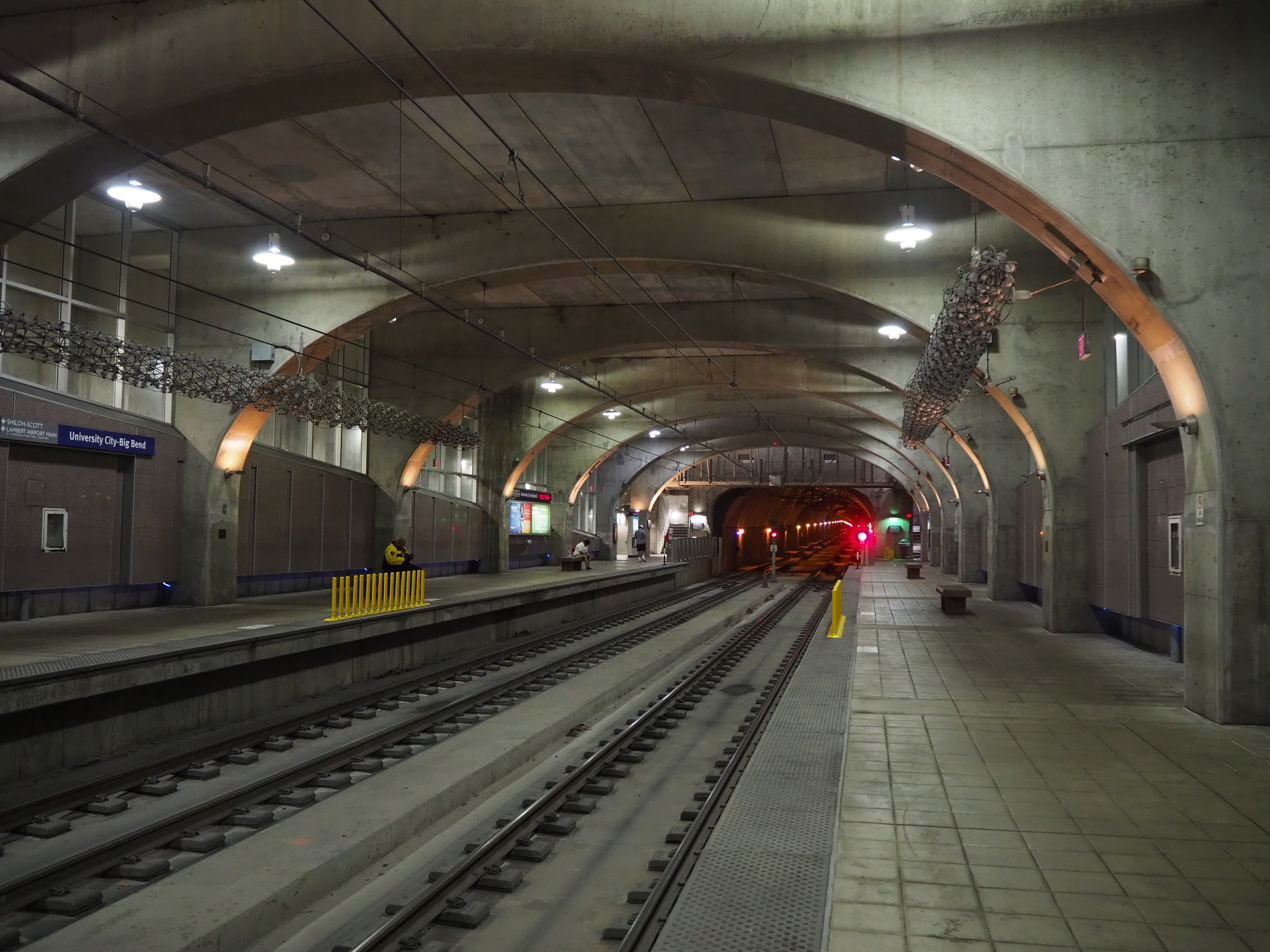
- Westbound platform at University City–Big Bend station

General information
- Location: 7000 Forest Park Parkway; University City, Missouri
- Coordinates: 38.65170°N 90.31524°W
- Owner: Bi-State Development Agency
- Operator: Metro Transit
- Platforms: 2 side platforms
- Tracks: 2
- Connections: MetroBus Missouri: 05

Construction
- Structure type: Underground
- Cycle facilities: Racks
- Accessible: Yes

History
- Opened: August 26, 2006

Passengers
- 2018: 486 daily
- Rank: 31 out of 38

Services
Preceding station	MetroLink	Following station
Forsyth toward Shrewsbury–Lansdowne I-44	Blue Line	Skinker toward Fairview Heights
Location

University City–Big Bend station is a light rail station on the Blue Line of the St. Louis MetroLink system. This subway station is located beneath the intersection of Big Bend Boulevard and Forest Park Parkway and primarily serves passengers arriving on foot from nearby universities and surrounding neighborhoods.

The station's entrances are clad in brick that matches neighboring buildings on Washington University's campus.

== Station layout ==
The station has an entrance at each corner of the intersection of Forest Park Parkway and Big Bend Boulevard, with an elevator at the northwest entrance, stairs at the southwest entrance, and ramps at the two eastern entrances. The station is located within the Big Bend Tunnel.

== Notable places nearby ==
- Delmar Loop
- Fontbonne University
- Washington University in St. Louis, Danforth Campus
