= Brentwood, Missouri =

City in St. Louis County, Missouri, United States

- City
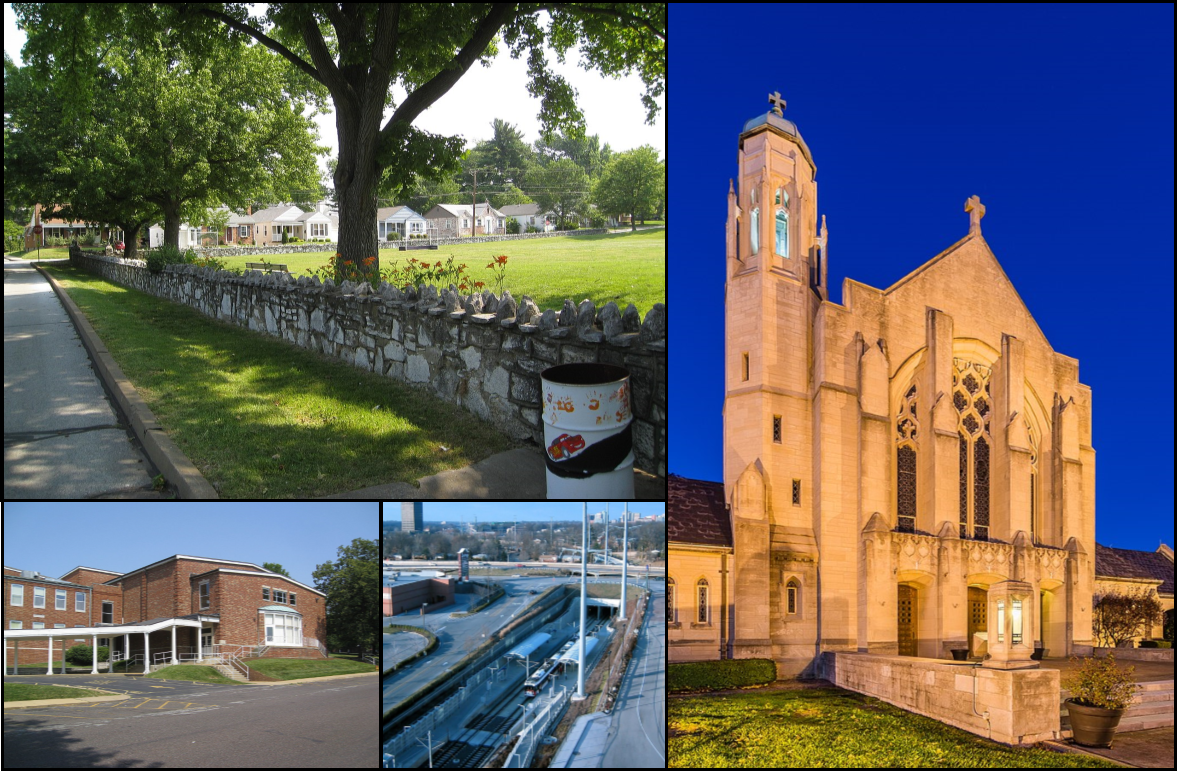
- Top left: Neighborhood near Mark Twain Elementary School; Right: St. Mary Magdalen Catholic Church; Bottom left: Brentwood High School; Bottom middle: Brentwood I-64 station

- Flag Logo
- Motto: City of Warmth
- Location of Brentwood, Missouri
- Coordinates: 38°37′10″N 90°20′51″W
- Country: United States
- State: Missouri
- County: St. Louis
- Township: Clayton
- Incorporated (village): December 15th, 1919
- Incorporated (city): April 12th, 1929

Government
  - Mayor: David Dimmitt

Area
  - Total: 1.95 sq mi (5.06 km^{2})
  - Land: 1.95 sq mi (5.06 km^{2})
  - Water: 0 sq mi (0.00 km^{2})
- Elevation: 492 ft (150 m)

Population (2024)
  - Total: 8,111
  - Density: 4,215.2/sq mi (1,627.48/km^{2})
- Time zone: UTC-6 (Central (CST))
  - Summer (DST): UTC-5 (CDT)
- ZIP code: 63144
- Area code: 314
- FIPS code: 29-08236
- GNIS feature ID: 2393411
- Website: City of Brentwood official website

Brentwood is an inner-ring suburb of St. Louis in Clayton Township, St. Louis County, Missouri, United States. The population was 8,233 at the 2020 census.

== History ==
The area that is Brentwood consists of three land purchases: that of Louis J. Bompart who acquired his lot first in 1804, that of the Gay family, and that of the Marshall family. In the 1870s, a man by the name of Thomas Madden arrived and soon became the businessman of the community. He operated a rock quarry, and constructed a tavern, a barbershop, a grocery store, and a blacksmith shop. Due to Madden's prominence in the community, the town was then named Maddenville.

With a location on the Manchester Trail, a route that was mostly frequented by mail coaches and prairie schooners going west, Maddenville in the 1800s became a prosperous town on the outskirts of St. Louis, to which it was connected by a streetcar line.

In 1919, it was discovered by the residents of Maddenville that the inhabitants of the neighboring Maplewood were planning to elect whether or not to annex their town. To avoid annexation and to establish their own school district, the residents decided to incorporate Maddenville into a village. On December 15, 1919, the town of Maddenville officially became the village of Brentwood.

During the late 1920s, the village earned an unhealthy reputation for its numerous gambling houses and illegal activities that took place around the intersection of Manchester Road and Brentwood Boulevard. The first mayor, James L. Willingham (in office from 1929 to 1931), ran on the promise to clean Brentwood up and eliminate the casinos, along with the hoodlums who hung around them, which he did. The town then became once again attractive for families. On April 12, 1929, Willingham signed ordinance 1A, which established Brentwood as a city and determined its boundaries.

== Geography ==
According to the United States Census Bureau, the city has a total area of 1.96 square miles (5.08 km^{2}), all land.

== Demographics ==
=== Racial and ethnic composition ===
Brentwood city, Missouri – Racial and ethnic composition Note: the US Census treats Hispanic/Latino as an ethnic category. This table excludes Latinos from the racial categories and assigns them to a separate category. Hispanics/Latinos may be of any race.
Race / Ethnicity (NH = Non-Hispanic)	Pop 2000	Pop 2010	Pop 2020	% 2000	% 2010	% 2020
White alone (NH)	7,039	6,891	6,674	91.50%	85.55%	81.06%
Black or African American alone (NH)	135	241	339	1.75%	2.99%	4.12%
Native American or Alaska Native alone (NH)	15	5	15	0.19%	0.06%	0.18%
Asian alone (NH)	267	545	498	3.47%	6.77%	6.05%
Native Hawaiian or Pacific Islander alone (NH)	0	1	1	0.00%	0.01%	0.01%
Other race alone (NH)	7	12	17	0.09%	0.15%	0.21%
Mixed race or Multiracial (NH)	97	137	389	1.26%	1.70%	4.72%
Hispanic or Latino (any race)	133	223	300	1.73%	2.77%	3.64%
Total	7,693	8,055	8,233	100.00%	100.00%	100.00%

Historical population
Census	Pop.	Note	%±
1930	2,819		—
1940	4,383		55.5%
1950	7,504		71.2%
1960	12,250		63.2%
1970	11,248		−8.2%
1980	8,209		−27.0%
1990	8,150		−0.7%
2000	7,693		−5.6%
2010	8,055		4.7%
2020	8,233		2.2%
U.S. Decennial Census

=== 2020 census ===
As of the 2020 census, Brentwood had a population of 8,233, with 4,152 households and 1,785 families.

The population density was 4,222.1 per square mile (1,627.1/km^{2}), and housing density was 2,185.6 units per square mile (842.3/km^{2}).

The median age was 35.5 years. 17.3% of residents were under the age of 18 and 14.5% were 65 years of age or older. For every 100 females, there were 89.9 males, and for every 100 females age 18 and over there were 85.0 males age 18 and over.

100.0% of residents lived in urban areas, while 0.0% lived in rural areas.

Of the 4,152 households, 20.0% had children under the age of 18. Of all households, 33.9% were married-couple households, 22.0% had a male householder with no spouse or partner present, and 36.2% had a female householder with no spouse or partner present. About 44.1% of all households were made up of individuals and 12.4% had someone living alone who was 65 years of age or older. The average household size was 2.0 and the average family size was 2.9.

There were 4,445 housing units, of which 6.6% were vacant. The homeowner vacancy rate was 1.7% and the rental vacancy rate was 7.0%.

=== Income and poverty ===
The 2016–2020 5-year American Community Survey estimates show that the median household income was $80,486 (with a margin of error of +/- $12,274) and the median family income was $108,087 (+/- $20,991). Males had a median income of $57,155 (+/- $8,764) versus $49,109 (+/- $6,748) for females. The median income for those above 16 years old was $54,071 (+/- $3,427). Approximately, 1.9% of families and 3.5% of the population were below the poverty line, including 3.6% of those under the age of 18 and 4.0% of those ages 65 or over.

=== 2010 census ===
As of the census of 2010, there were 8,055 people, 4,136 households, and 1,832 families living in the city. The population density was 4,109.7 inhabitants per square mile (1,586.8/km^{2}). There were 4,410 housing units at an average density of 2,250.0 per square mile (868.7/km^{2}). The racial makeup of the city was 87.5% White, 3.1% African American, 0.1% Native American, 6.8% Asian, 0.6% from other races, and 1.9% from two or more races. Hispanic or Latino of any race were 2.8% of the population.

There were 4,136 households, of which 20.8% had children under the age of 18 living with them, 33.6% were married couples living together, 8.0% had a female householder with no husband present, 2.8% had a male householder with no wife present, and 55.7% were non-families. 46.1% of all households were made up of individuals, and 9.5% had someone living alone who was 65 years of age or older. The average household size was 1.94 and the average family size was 2.86.

The median age in the city was 35 years. 18.4% of residents were under the age of 18; 7.9% were between the ages of 18 and 24; 37.4% were from 25 to 44; 24% were from 45 to 64; and 12.4% were 65 years of age or older. The gender makeup of the city was 46.1% male and 53.9% female.

=== 2000 census ===
As of the census of 2000, there were 7,693 people, 3,929 households, and 1,775 families living in the city. The population density was 3,948.4 inhabitants per square mile (1,524.5/km^{2}). There were 4,088 housing units at an average density of 2,098.1 per square mile (810.1/km^{2}). The racial makeup of the city was 92.68% White, 1.81% African American, 0.19% Native American, 3.48% Asian, 0.32% from other races, .0278 Hispanic or Latino of any race were 1.73% of the population.

There were 3,929 households, out of which 19.7% had children under the age of 18 living with them, 35.3% were married couples living together, 7.8% had a female householder with no husband present, and 54.8% were non-families. 46.5% of all households were made up of individuals, and 11.2% had someone living alone who was 65 years of age or older. The average household size was 1.96 and the average family size was 2.88.

In the city the population was spread out, with 19.2% under the age of 18, 7.2% from 18 to 24, 40.2% from 25 to 44, 19.0% from 45 to 64, and 14.4% who were 65 years of age or older. The median age was 36 years.

The median income for a household in the city was $60,643, and the median income for a family was $63,311. Males had a median income of $47,113 versus $38,924 for females. The per capita income for the city was $30,645. About 3.4% of families and 5.5% of the population were below the poverty line, including 5.7% of those under age 18 and 7.7% of those age 65 or over.

== Transportation ==
=== Public transportation ===
Brentwood is served by the Blue Line of the St. Louis region's MetroLink light rail system. The city has one station, Brentwood I-64. Metro Transit also operates the Brentwood Transit Center located on Musick Memorial Drive. It connects the Brentwood I-64 light rail station with MetroBus routes and paratransit services.

=== Major roads and highways ===
Major arterial routes in Brentwood include Brentwood Boulevard, Hanley Road, and Manchester Road. The interchange of Interstate 64 and Interstate 170 is just north of the city limits in Richmond Heights.

== Education ==
Brentwood School District operates two elementary schools, one middle school, and Brentwood High School. The town also contains one additional catholic private school, Saint Mary Magdalen Catholic School, which hosts students grades K-8. The school is an extension of the local Catholic church with the same name.

The town has a lending library, the Brentwood Public Library.

== See also ==
- List of cities in Missouri
