= Skinker station =

Light rail station in St. Louis, Missouri, US

Skinker
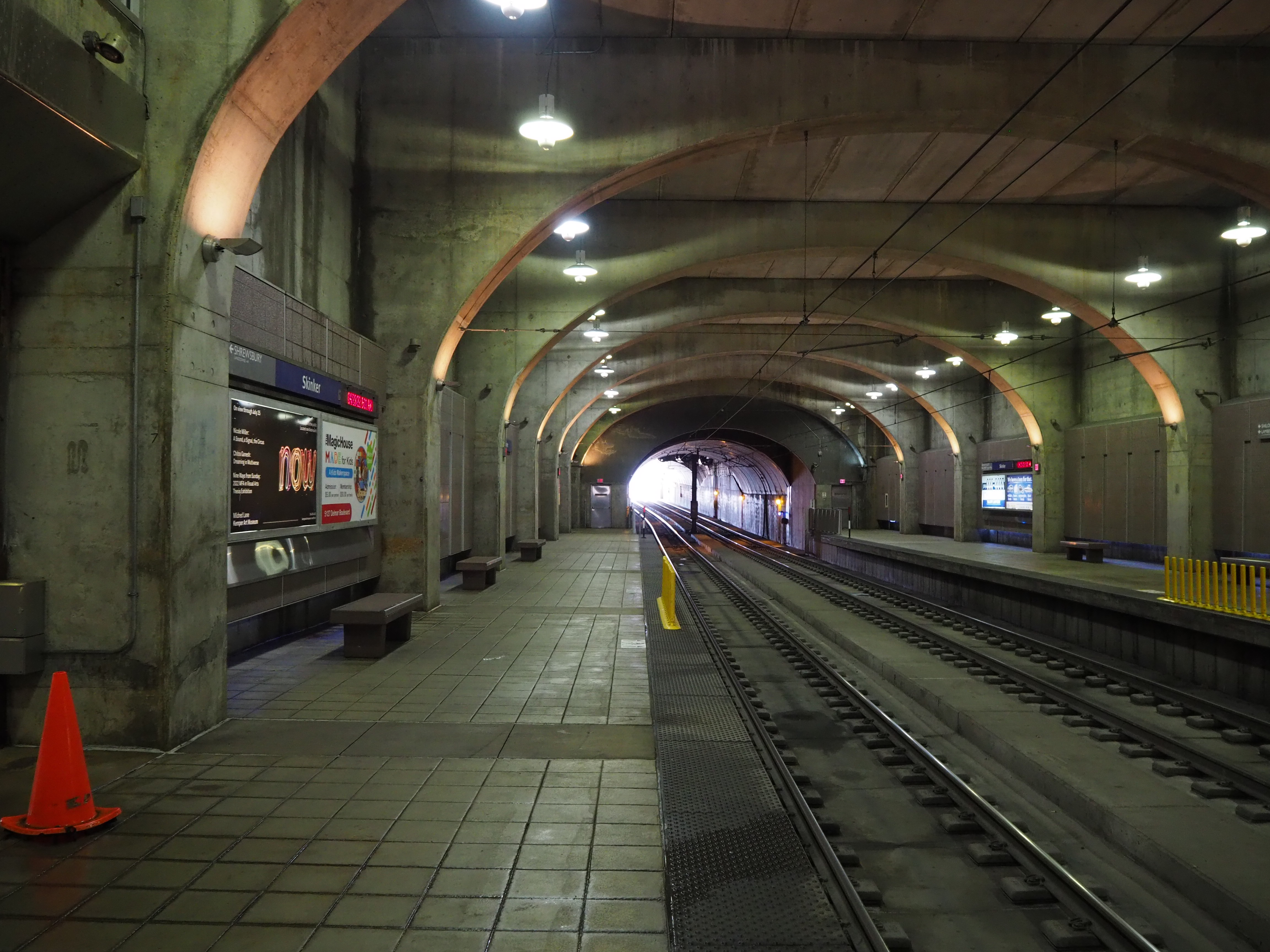
- Westbound platform at Skinker station, looking east

General information
- Location: 260 North Skinker Boulevard; St. Louis, Missouri
- Coordinates: 38.649202°N 90.300653°W
- Owner: Bi-State Development
- Operator: Metro Transit
- Platforms: 2 side platforms
- Tracks: 2
- Connections: MetroBus Missouri: 01, 02, 05, 16

Construction
- Structure type: Underground
- Cycle facilities: Racks
- Accessible: Yes

History
- Opened: August 26, 2006

Passengers
- 2018: 887 daily
- Rank: 20 out of 38

Services
Preceding station	MetroLink	Following station
University City–Big Bend toward Shrewsbury–Lansdowne I-44	Blue Line	Forest Park–DeBaliviere toward Fairview Heights
Location

Skinker station is a light rail station on the Blue Line of the St. Louis MetroLink system. This subway station is located beneath the intersection of Skinker Boulevard and Forest Park Parkway near the boundary of St. Louis and University City, Missouri.

The station's entrances are clad in brick that matches neighboring buildings on Washington University's campus.

== Station layout ==
There are two entrances to the station, one on the northeast corner of the intersection of Skinker Boulevard and Forest Park Parkway featuring stairs and an elevator, and one on the southwest corner featuring stairs and a ramp. Each entrance leads to a bridge over the tracks from which both platforms can be accessed.

The station is located within the Skinker Tunnel, but the tracks are located above-ground immediately outside of the tunnel in both directions; on the south side of Forest Park Parkway to the east of the station and on the north side to the west.

== Public artwork ==
In 2006, Metro's Arts in Transit program commissioned the work Speed Shift by Erwin Redl for this station. Located on the mezzanine crosswalk overlooking the platforms, two pairs of rectangular LED boards face each other from both ends of the gangway. Strips of horizontal light zip toward the centers of the rectangles in accordance with synchronized beeping sounds.

== Notable places nearby ==
- Delmar Loop
- Forest Park
- Mildred Lane Kemper Art Museum
- Washington University in St. Louis, Danforth Campus
