= Forsyth station =

Light rail station in St. Louis County, Missouri, US

Forsyth
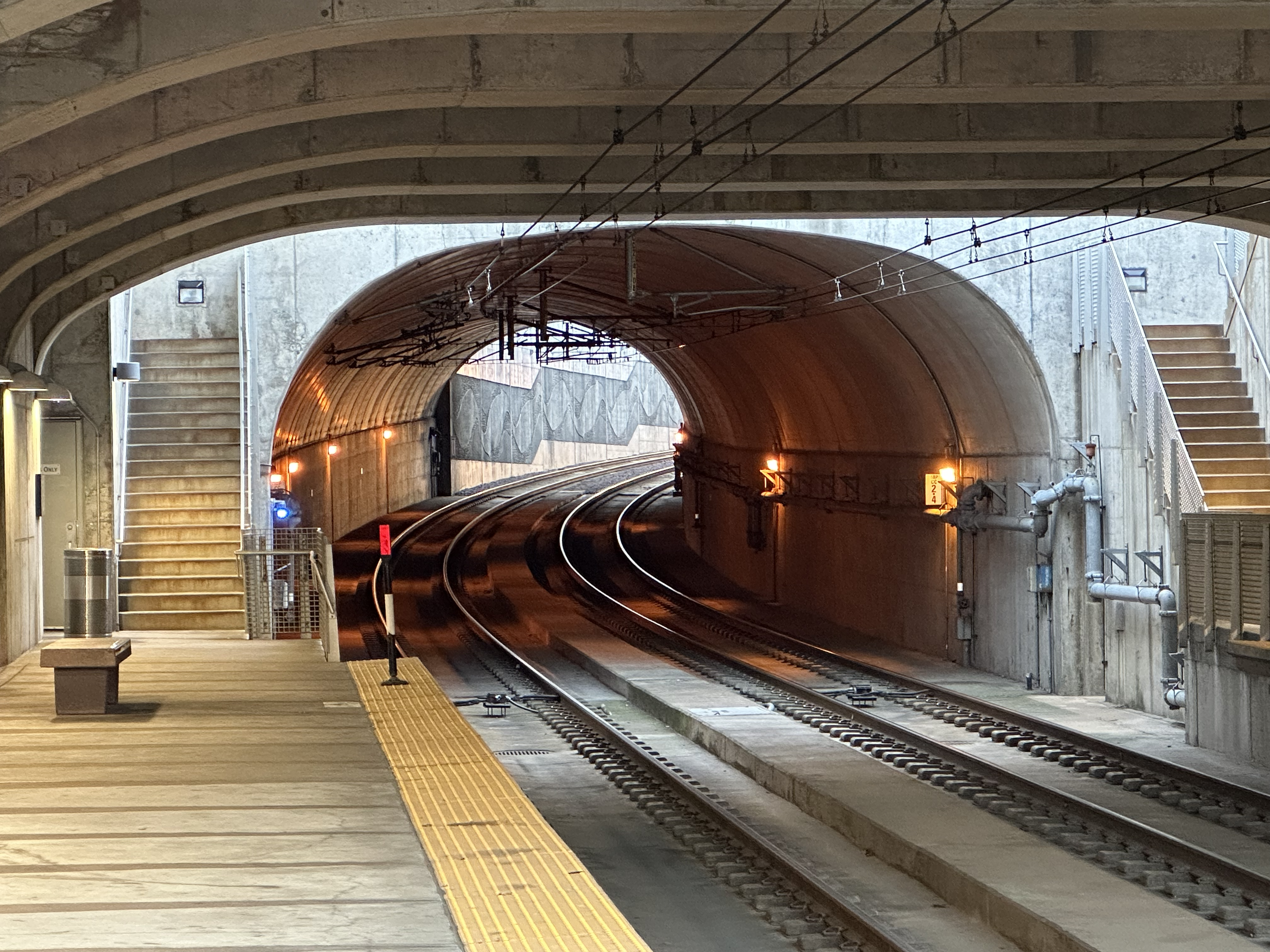
- Forsyth station in 2023

General information
- Location: 7411 Forsyth Boulevard; University City, Missouri
- Coordinates: 38.649061°N 90.328117°W
- Owner: Bi-State Development
- Operator: Metro Transit
- Platforms: 2 side platforms
- Tracks: 2

Construction
- Structure type: Below-grade
- Cycle facilities: Rack
- Accessible: Yes

History
- Opened: August 26, 2006

Passengers
- 2018: 362 daily
- Rank: 36 out of 38

Services
Preceding station	MetroLink	Following station
Clayton toward Shrewsbury–Lansdowne I-44	Blue Line	University City–Big Bend toward Fairview Heights
Location

Forsyth station is a light rail station on the Blue Line of the St. Louis MetroLink system. This below-grade station is located beneath the intersection of Forest Park Parkway and Forsyth Boulevard near the border of University City and Clayton.

== Station layout ==
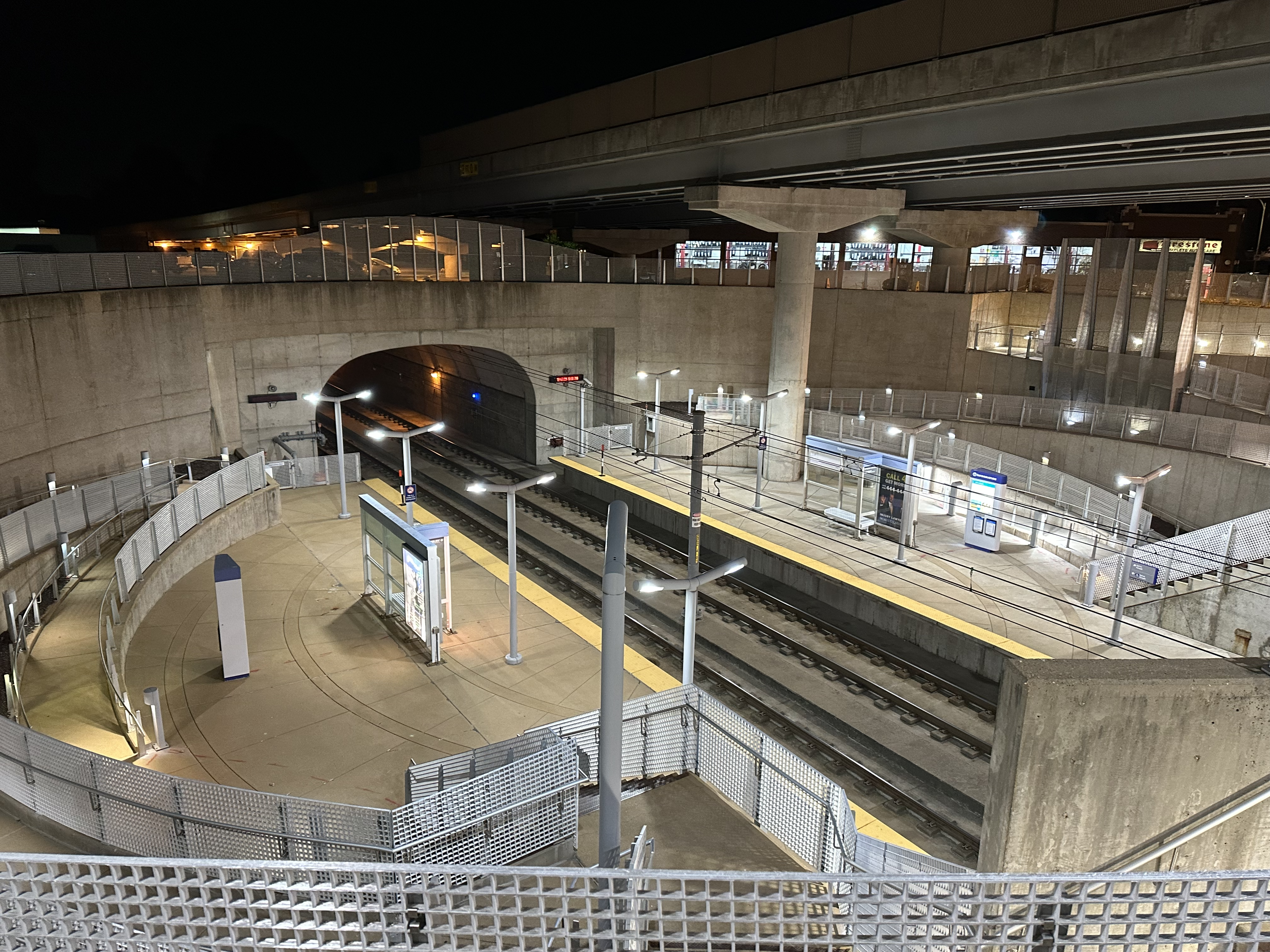
Forsyth platforms in 2023

The station sits within an open cut of the Big Bend Tunnel with its platforms partially beneath the Forsyth overpass for shelter. The platforms are reached by stairs on Forsyth's south side and by stairs and circular switchback ramps on its north side.

== Public artwork ==
In 2006, Metro's Arts in Transit program commissioned the work Hoi Polloi by Lindsey Stouffer for this station. Its perforated stainless-steel screens appear to shimmer as people walk by, due to an optical illusion known as the moiré effect. At night, the screens are lit from within, diffusing light like enormous lanterns.

== Notable places nearby ==
- Downtown Clayton
- The Ritz-Carlton Saint Louis
- Washington University in St. Louis, West Campus
