= Forest Park Parkway (St. Louis) =

Road in Missouri, United States

- Forest Park Avenue
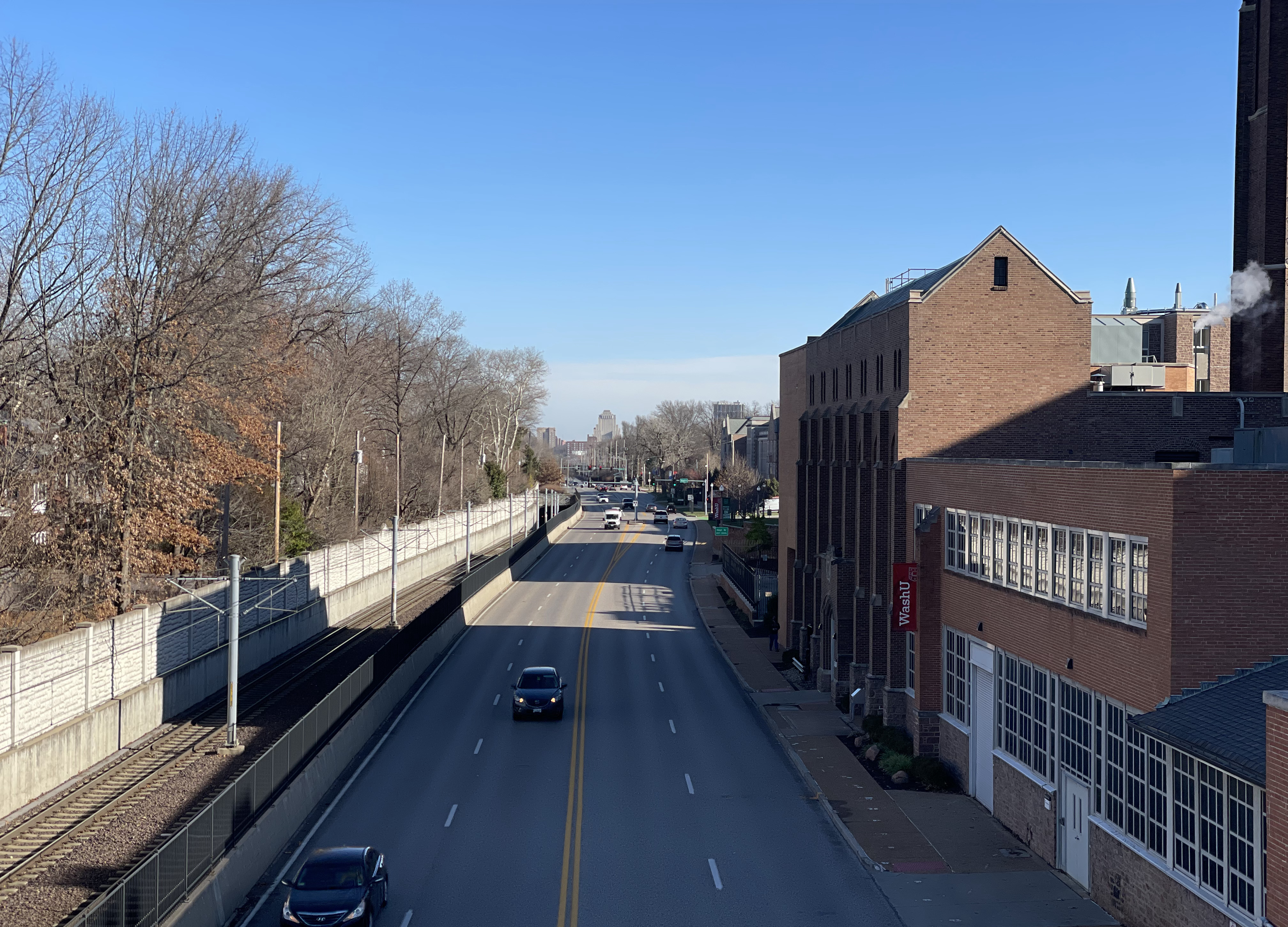
- Forest Park Parkway as seen from the Washington University overpass looking east.
- Namesake: Forest Park
- Type: Parkway
- Maintained by: St. Louis County, St. Louis
- Length: 6.8 mi (10.9 km)
- Location: Clayton–St. Louis, Missouri
- Postal code: 63105, 63130, 63112, 63108, 63110, 63103
- East end: I-64 in St. Louis
- West end: I-170 in Clayton

Forest Park Parkway is a parkway in Clayton, Missouri and St. Louis that runs from Interstate 170, becomes Forest Park Avenue at Kingshighway Boulevard, and ends at Market Street and Interstate 64. It is considered an arterial snow route. Its right-of-way has carried various railroad lines throughout much of its history.

== History ==
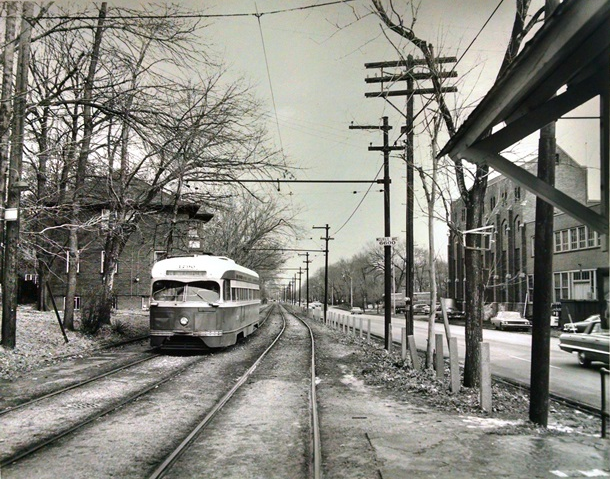
A #14 University-Clayton streetcar along Millbrook in the 1960s

The corridor began life in the 19th century as a heavy rail line used by the Rock Island and Wabash railroads along with local streetcars. The segment between the Terminal Railroad's Central Belt Subdivision (near present day Interstate 170) and Forsyth Junction (now the junction of MetroLink's Red and Blue lines) was abandoned by the Rock Island in 1931. Prior to its abandonment, the railroad operated a passenger depot at Clayton, near the spot of today's MetroLink station. In the 1940s, before the suspension of streetcar service in the St. Louis area, the portion of this corridor between Pershing and DeBaliviere avenues carried the #1 Kirkwood and the #14 University-Clayton streetcar lines. Service on the Kirkwood line ended in 1950 with service on the University-Clayton line ending in 1963. The Wabash Railroad continued to operate freight service east and north of Forsyth Junction until 1988.

Millbrook Boulevard was built in a portion of the abandoned Rock Island right-of-way and in 1959, construction began on Forest Park Parkway, an urban renewal project which saw Millbrook renamed and extended from Skinker Boulevard to Kingshighway. Here, the Parkway meets Forest Park Avenue which runs east to its present terminus at Market Street and Compton Avenue at Interstate 64 in Midtown St. Louis.

In 2017, the city of St. Louis and BJC Healthcare opened a reconstructed at-grade intersection between Forest Park Avenue and Kingshighway Boulevard. Previously, Forest Park Avenue dipped below-grade and passed beneath Kingshighway as it became Forest Park Parkway. Currently, the intersection with Grand Boulevard still has this underpass feature as motorists enter and exit I-64.

== MetroLink ==
=== Airport/Central Corridor ===
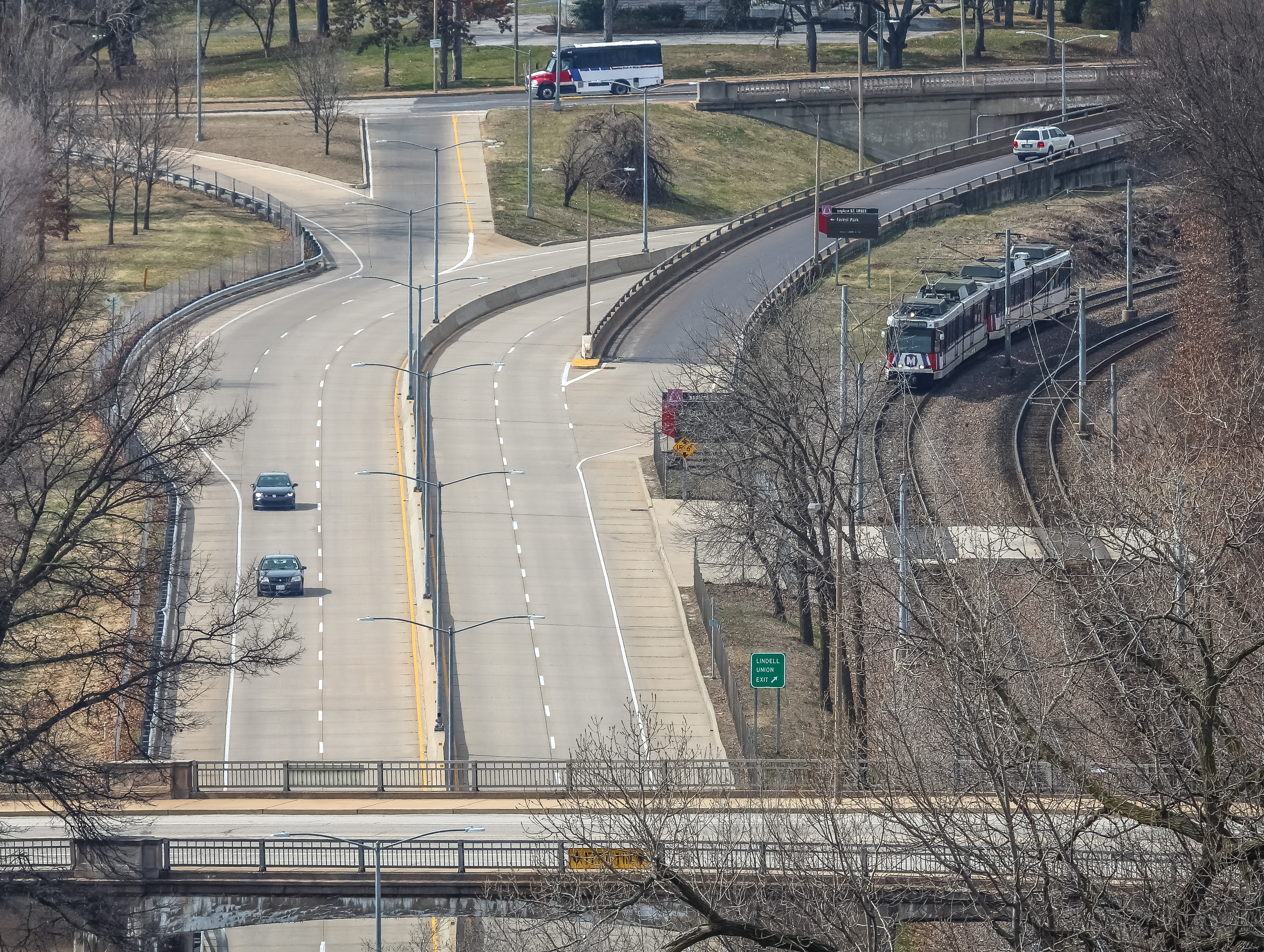
A MetroLink train passes next to Forest Park Parkway within Forest Park

In 1993, MetroLink's initial route opened between St. Louis Lambert International Airport and East St. Louis, Illinois. Roughly 7.8 miles (12.6 km) of the abandoned Wabash right-of-way between Normandy in North St. Louis County and Grand Boulevard in St. Louis were reused. The Forest Park-DeBaliviere station was built at the former Forsyth Junction, where the Rock Island and Wabash railroads once met.

=== Cross County Extension ===
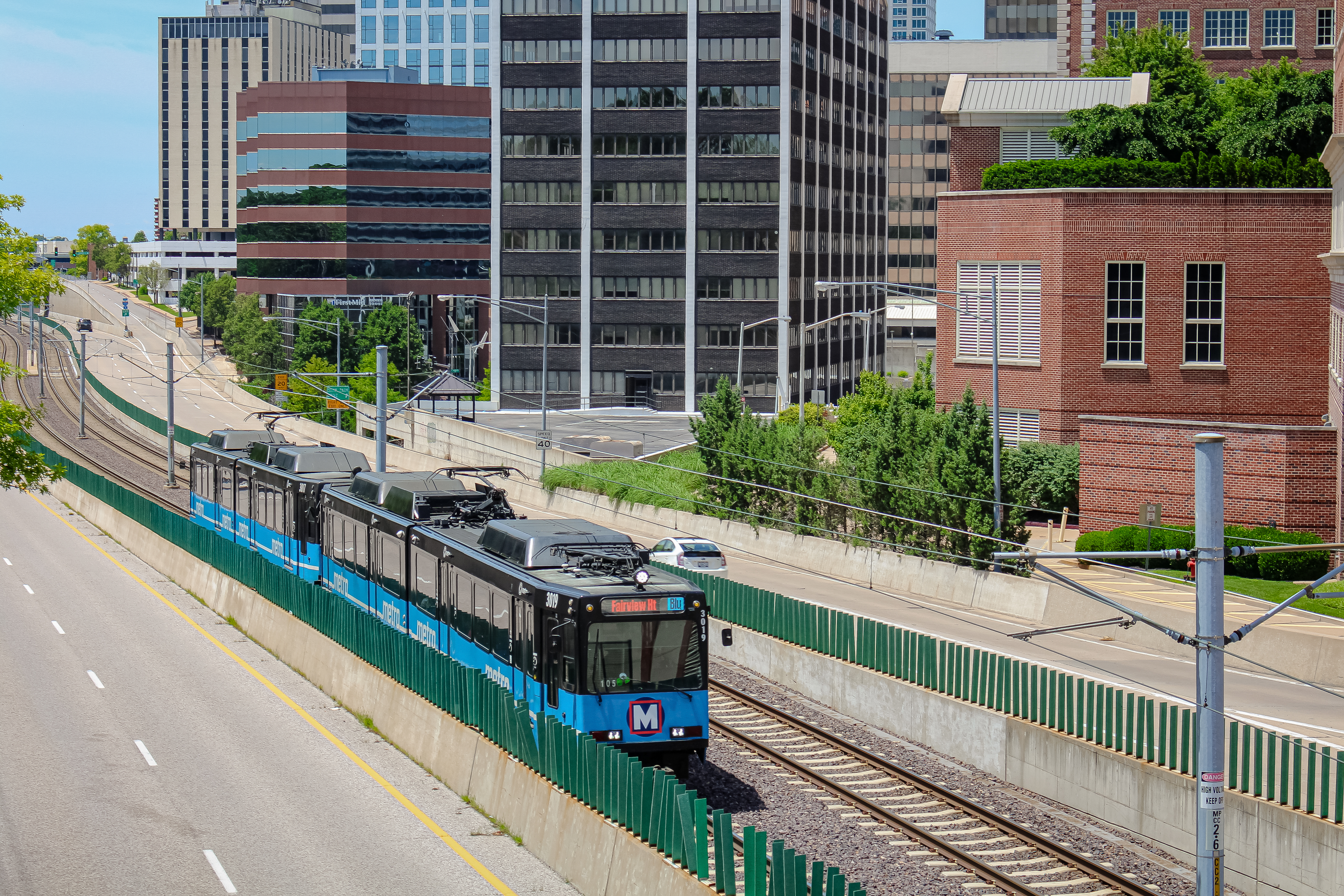
MetroLink's Blue Line running in the median of Forest Park Parkway in downtown Clayton

In June 1999, the East-West Gateway Council of Governments released conceptual designs for the Cross County MetroLink extension including at-grade, below-grade and elevated portions. Initially, trains were to run at-grade in the median of Forest Park Parkway with stations between Forest Park and Clayton. After considering feedback from local residents, Metro opted to move this segment into cuts and subway tunnels along the former streetcar right-of-way and place the Skinker and University City-Big Bend stations underground. These changes were finalized in 2002 but led to delays and cost overruns on the extension. However, construction began in 2003 and the extension opened on August 26, 2006.

== Major intersections and stations ==
County	Location	mi	km	Destination / Intersection	Notes
City of St. Louis		0.00	0.00	Market Street/Interstate 64	Beginning of Forest Park Avenue
City of St. Louis		0.6	0.96	Vandeventer Ave	
City of St. Louis		2.0	3.21	Kingshighway Blvd	Western terminus of avenue, start of parkway
City of St. Louis		2.6	4.18	Lindell/Union Blvd	Eastbound entrance and exit, westbound exit
City of St. Louis		3.2	5.14	DeBaliviere Ave	
City of St. Louis		4.1	6.59	Skinker Blvd	
St. Louis County	University City	4.8	7.72	Big Bend Blvd	
St. Louis County	University City	5.2	8.36	Pershing Ave	No access for eastbound traffic
St. Louis County	University City	6.2	9.97	Bemiston Ave (Shaw Park Drive)	Eastbound entrance and westbound exit
St. Louis County	Clayton	6.3	10.13	Central Ave (Government Center)	Eastbound exit and westbound entrance
St. Louis County	Clayton	6.4	10.29	Brentwood Blvd	Eastbound exit and westbound entrance
St. Louis County	Clayton	6.8	10.94	Interstate 170	Western terminus

Station	Location	Service	Type	Points of interest
Forest Park–DeBaliviere	250 DeBaliviere Avenue	Red Blue	Below-grade	Forest Park, Loop Trolley, Missouri History Museum, The Muny
Skinker	260 North Skinker Boulevard	Blue	Underground	Delmar Loop, Forest Park, Saint Louis Art Museum, Washington University in St. Louis
University City–Big Bend	7000 Forest Park Parkway	Blue	Underground	Fontbonne University, University City, Washington University in St. Louis
Forsyth	7411 Forsyth Boulevard	Blue	Below-grade	Carondelet Plaza, Downtown Clayton, University City
Clayton	275 South Central Avenue	Blue	At-grade	Downtown Clayton, Shaw Park, St. Louis County Government Center
