= Blue Line (St. Louis MetroLink) =

Light rail line in the Greater St. Louis area

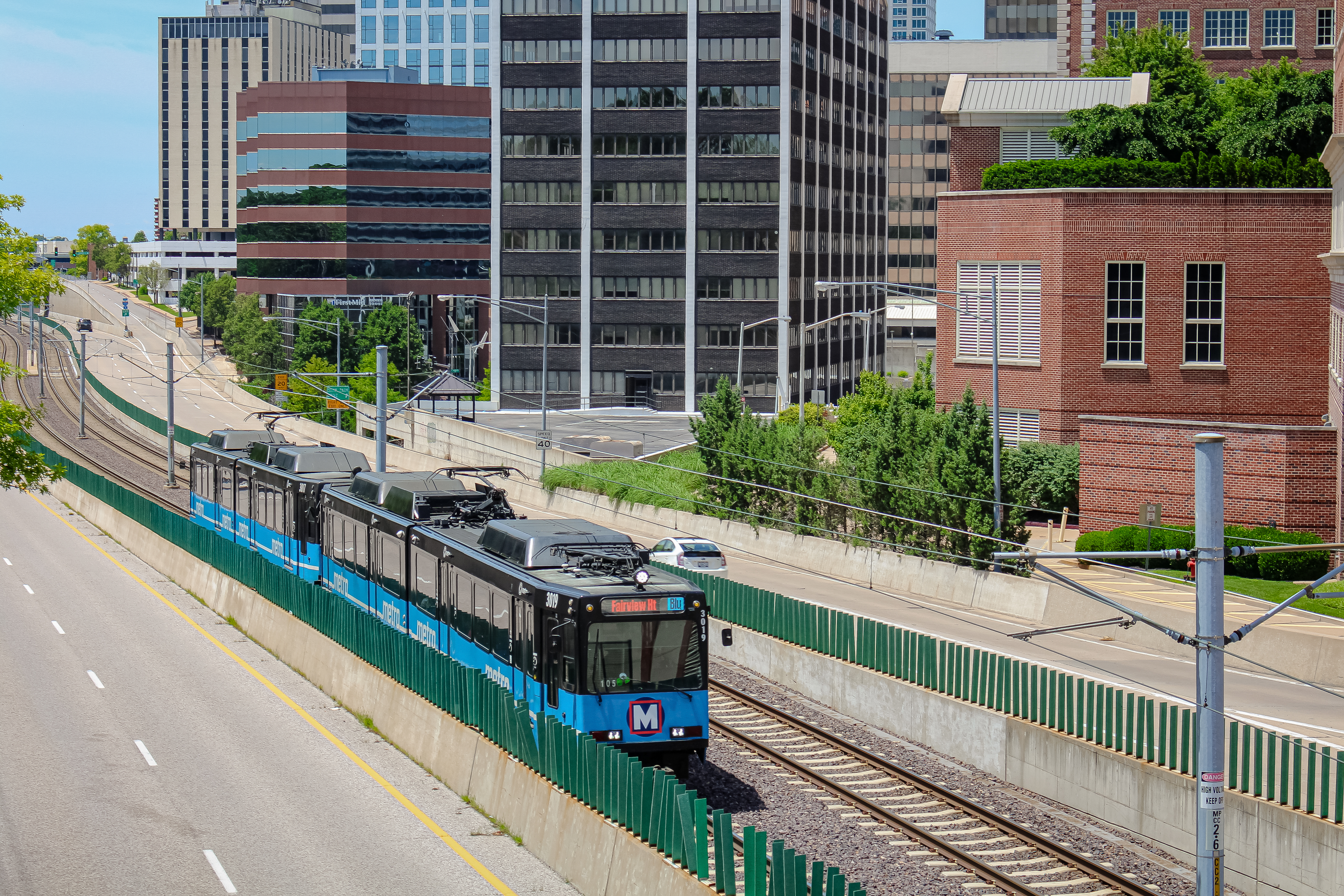
- A Blue Line train in Clayton in 2024

Overview
- Other name: Cross County Extension
- Status: Operational
- Owner: Bi-State Development Agency
- Locale: Greater St. Louis, Missouri–Illinois, U.S.
- Termini: Shrewsbury-Lansdowne I-44 (west); Fairview Heights (east)
- Stations: 25
- Website: metrostlouis.org/metrolink

Service
- Type: Light rail
- System: St. Louis MetroLink
- Operator: Metro Transit
- Depots: Ewing Yard and Shops; 29th Street Yard and Shops

History
- Opened: August 26, 2006
- Previous names: Shrewsbury Branch

Technical
- Line length: 24 mi (39 km)
- Character: Elevated, subway, at-grade
- Track gauge: 4 ft 8 1/2 in (1,435 mm) standard gauge
- Electrification: Overhead line, 750 V DC
Route map
Blue Line highlighted in blue

The Blue Line is the newest and shortest line of the MetroLink light rail service in Greater St. Louis. It serves 25 stations across three counties and two states.

While officially light rail, the Blue Line features many characteristics of a light metro or rapid transit service, including a completely independent right of way, a higher top speed, and level boarding at all platforms.

== History ==
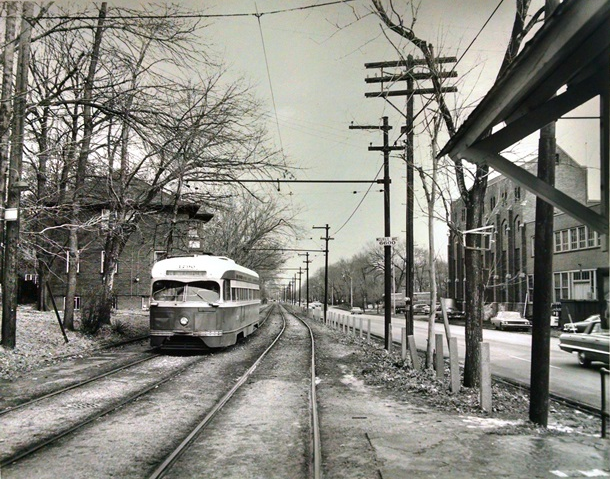
A #14 University-Clayton streetcar in the 1960s. Today, the Blue Line operates in this right of way.

Much of the Blue Line follows former railroad right of way. Starting north from Shrewsbury, the alignment crosses BNSF's Southeastern Junction and follows former Terminal Railroad Association of St. Louis right of way to Clayton, briefly along Interstate 170. The stretch running eastward along Forest Park Parkway between Clayton and the Forest Park–DeBaliviere station was a Rock Island railroad right of way until it was abandoned in 1931. The section between Pershing and DeBaliviere avenues carried the #1 Kirkwood and the #14 University-Clayton streetcar lines until 1963.

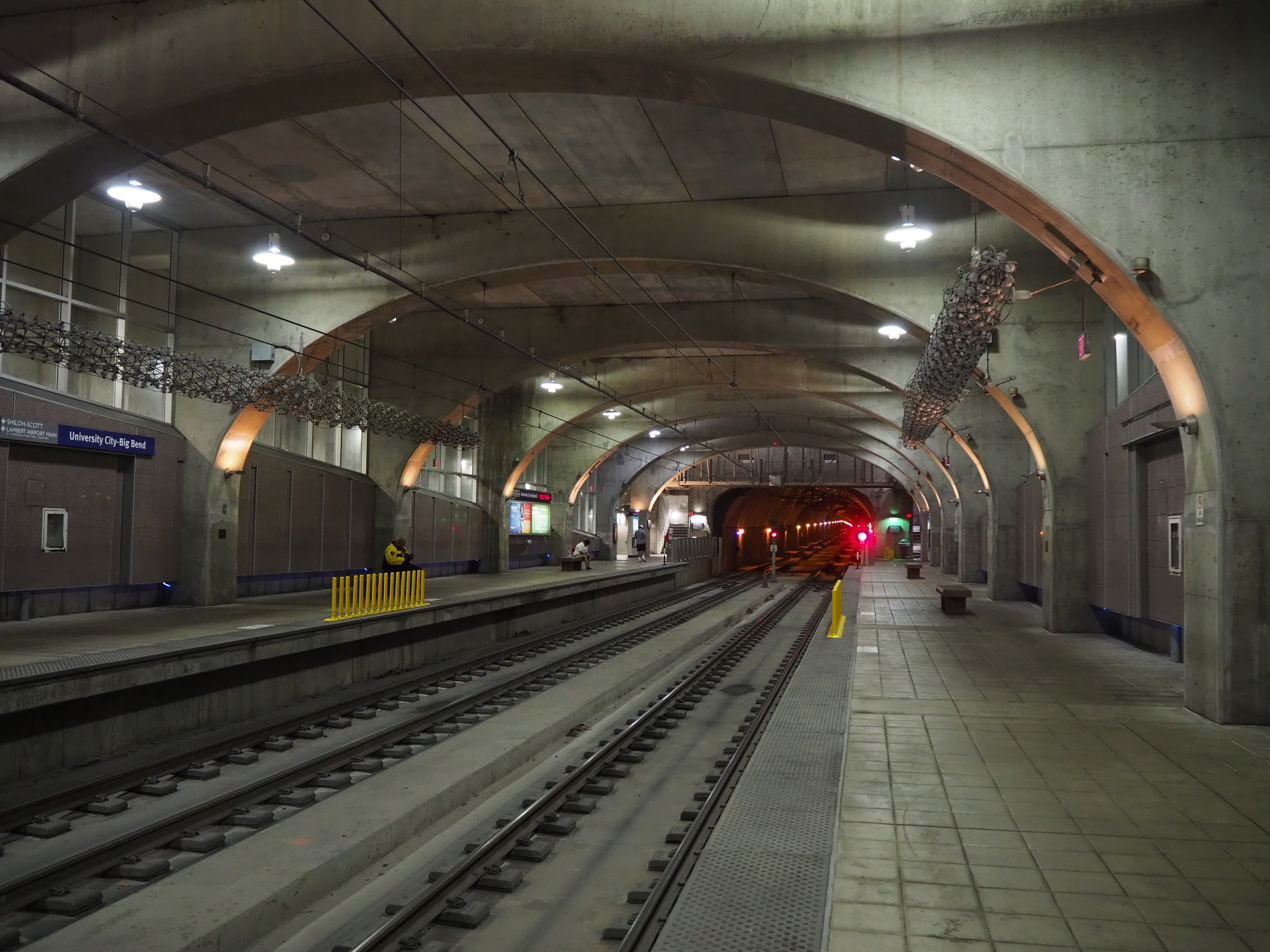
The westbound platform at University City-Big Bend on the Blue Line

In 1999, East-West Gateway staff members submitted an updated conceptual design for Segment 1 of the Cross County extension between Forest Park and Shrewsbury. Metro did not seek federal funding, instead issuing $430 million in bonds against Proposition M sales taxes. After several delays and design changes, construction began on April 9, 2003 with an estimated cost of $550 million.

Citing repeated delays and cost overruns, Metro fired and then sued its general contractor, Cross County Collaborative, in the summer of 2004. Metro sought $81 million in damages for fraud and mismanagement while the Collaborative counter-sued for $17 million for work that Metro hadn't paid for. On December 1, 2007, a jury awarded the Collaborative $2.56 million.

The 8-mile (12.9 km) Cross County extension opened on August 26, 2006 with a final cost of $676 million and added nine stations between Forest Park-DeBaliviere and Shrewsbury–Lansdowne I-44. From its 2006 opening until October 27, 2008, the Blue Line was known as the Shrewsbury branch.

In 2013, the St. Louis County Council authorized loaning Metro $400 million of surplus Proposition A funds to pay off debt related to the Cross County extension.

On July 26, 2022, a flash flood shut down MetroLink for nearly 72 hours, causing roughly $40 million in damage, including to two elevators, two communications rooms, and three signal houses. While the Red Line resumed normal service in September, Blue Line service would be limited for nearly two years. On July 31, 2023, Metro received $27.7 million in federal emergency disaster relief funding to help with the repairs. In March 2024, the last damaged signal house was restored to operation and Blue Line platform and speed restrictions were lifted.

== Route ==
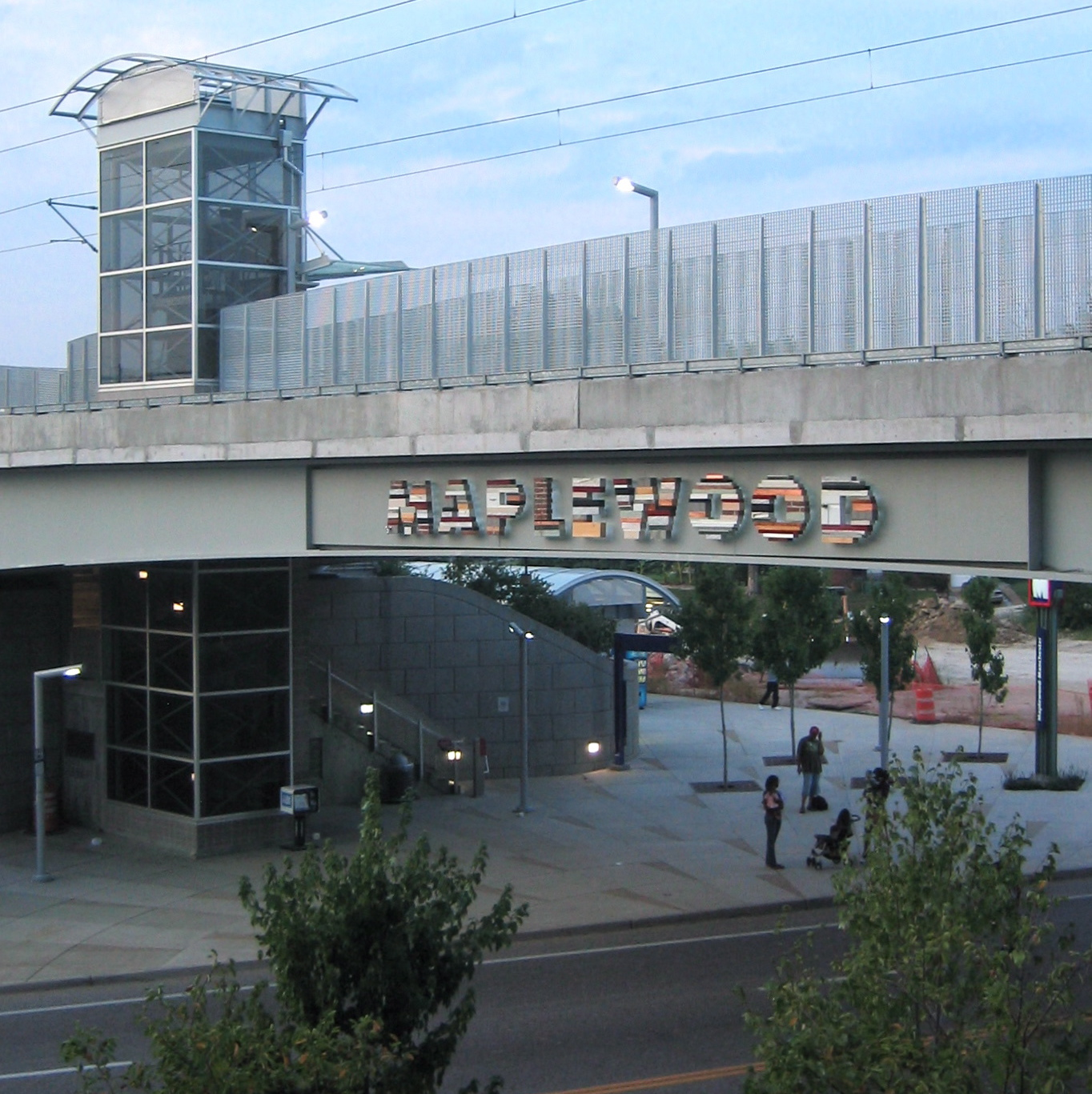
A view of the viaduct carrying the Blue Line over Manchester Road in Maplewood, Missouri.

The 24-mile (39 km) Blue Line alignment starts in Shrewsbury, Missouri (Shrewsbury-Lansdowne I-44) just west of the River des Peres. It crosses over Interstate 44 and continues north to the next two stations located in Maplewood, Missouri (Sunnen and Maplewood/Manchester). The line continues north to the Brentwood I-64 station, located in Brentwood, Missouri just south of Interstate 64. It proceeds north in a tunnel under Interstate 64, continuing to the Richmond Heights station serving the Saint Louis Galleria shopping mall. The line then proceeds through a sharp turn east to the Clayton station in the median of Forest Park Parkway in Clayton, Missouri where it serves the Central Business District of St. Louis County. It continues to the Forsyth station where it enters a tunnel traveling to the University City-Big Bend subway station. Entering St. Louis City, the Blue Line stops at the Skinker subway station serving nearby Washington University. At the following station, Forest Park-DeBaliviere, the Blue Line meets the Red Line; the two services then share the alignment until the Blue Line terminates at the Fairview Heights station in Illinois.

=== Shared Alignment ===
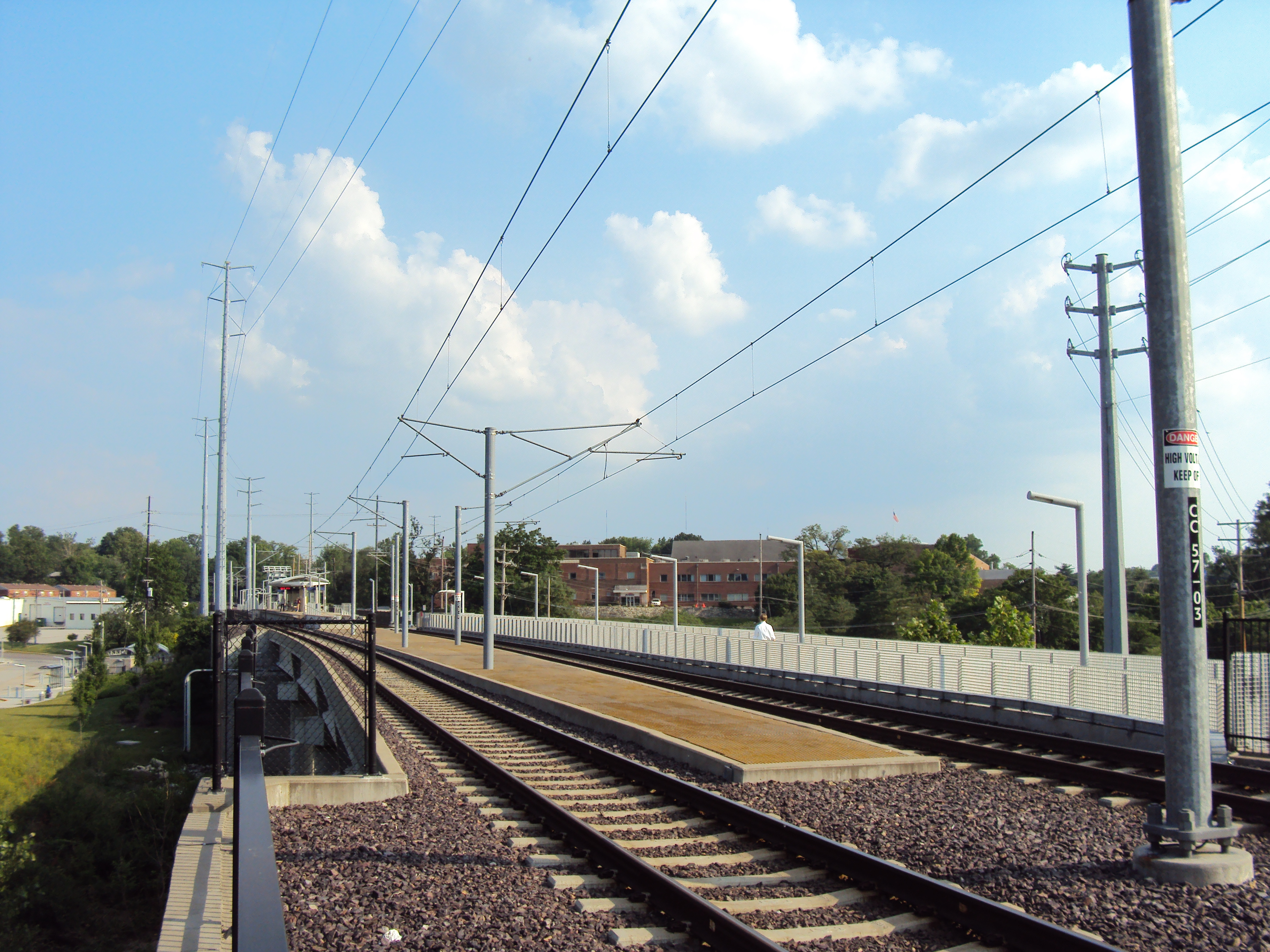
Blue Line tracks near the Maplewood-Manchester station.

In all, the Blue and Red lines share tracks for 16 stations. From west to east: the Central West End and Cortex stations that serve the Central West End neighborhood, Washington University Medical Center, and Cortex Innovation Community. The Grand station transfers with the busy #70 MetroBus line and serves Saint Louis University and its hospital. Next, the Union Station, Civic Center, Stadium, 8th & Pine, Convention Center, and Laclede's Landing stations serve downtown St. Louis and its many destinations. A connection to the proposed Green Line BRT is planned at Civic Center station. Crossing the historic Eads Bridge into Illinois, the line serves the East Riverfront, 5th & Missouri, Emerson Park, Jackie Joyner-Kersee Center, and Washington Park stations in East St. Louis, Illinois. At the next station, Fairview Heights, the Blue Line terminates and the shared alignment ends.

=== Stations ===
From Shrewsbury−Lansdowne I-44 to Fairview Heights (west to east)

Station	Transfer	City/town served	County	Opening date
Shrewsbury–Lansdowne I-44		Shrewsbury	St. Louis County	August 26, 2006
Sunnen		Maplewood	St. Louis County	August 26, 2006
Maplewood–Manchester		Maplewood	St. Louis County	August 26, 2006
Brentwood I-64		Brentwood	St. Louis County	August 26, 2006
Richmond Heights		Richmond Heights	St. Louis County	August 26, 2006
Clayton		Clayton	St. Louis County	August 26, 2006
Forsyth		Clayton	St. Louis County	August 26, 2006
University City–Big Bend		University City	St. Louis County	August 26, 2006
Skinker		Independent city of St. Louis		August 26, 2006
Forest Park–DeBaliviere	Red	Independent city of St. Louis		July 31, 1993
Central West End	Red	Independent city of St. Louis		July 31, 1993
Cortex	Red	Independent city of St. Louis		July 31, 2018
Grand	Red	Independent city of St. Louis		July 31, 1993
Union Station	Red	Independent city of St. Louis		July 31, 1993
Civic Center	Red Green (planned)	Independent city of St. Louis		July 31, 1993
Stadium	Red	Independent city of St. Louis		July 31, 1993
8th & Pine	Red	Independent city of St. Louis		July 31, 1993
Convention Center	Red	Independent city of St. Louis		July 31, 1993
Laclede's Landing	Red	Independent city of St. Louis		July 31, 1993
East Riverfront	Red	East St. Louis	St. Clair County	May 14, 1994
5th & Missouri	Red	East St. Louis	St. Clair County	July 31, 1993
Emerson Park	Red	East St. Louis	St. Clair County	May 5, 2001
Jackie Joyner-Kersee Center	Red	East St. Louis	St. Clair County	May 5, 2001
Washington Park	Red	East St. Louis	St. Clair County	May 5, 2001
Fairview Heights	Red	Fairview Heights	St. Clair County	May 5, 2001

=== Operations ===
The Blue Line operates on 20 minute headways beginning at 5:08 A.M. for eastbound trains, which originate from Shrewsbury-Lansdowne I-44, and at 4:13 A.M. for westbound trains, which originate at Jackie Joyner-Kersee Center. The final six eastbound trains terminate at different stations: 11:40 P.M. at Fairview Heights, 11:50 P.M., 12:10 A.M. and 12:30 A.M. at Emerson Park, and 12:37 A.M. and 1:07 A.M at Civic Center. The final westbound train terminates at Shrewsbury-Lansdowne I-44 at 12:33 A.M.

== Public artwork ==
In 2002, Metro's Arts in Transit program commissioned a group of artists to join architects and engineers during the design phase of the Cross County extension. This practice of artist participation during system design began during the design and construction of the initial 1993 MetroLink alignment. The work of these artists involved exploration of landscape alternatives, designing the paving patterns for concrete adjacent to stations, and creating the “flow”-patterned retaining walls running along the tracks in the below-grade stretches of the alignment.

In 2006, the Arts in Transit program commissioned a work made for at-grade stretches of the alignment. An overlay of lacy aluminum silhouettes, titled A Walk in the Park, embellishes the concrete privacy fence, called the Catlin Wall, which runs parallel to the tracks between the Skinker and Forest Park-DeBaliviere stations. Created by Andy Cross, Carl Harris, and Ty de LaVenta, the work is a series of cut metal panels depicting trees, vines, leaves, and trellises.

== Projects in progress ==
=== System rehabilitation ===
In 2023, Metro began a system-wide rehabilitation program that will last several years. Work on the Blue Line will include the rehabilitation of the Cross County tunnels along with the Skinker and University City–Big Bend stations. Included is the construction of a storage siding near the Richmond Heights station. Elsewhere, catenary wire, curve tracks, platforms, retaining walls, staircases, and system conduit are to be upgraded or replaced.

In 2026, Metro expects to complete upgrades to the Supervisory Control Automated Data Acquisition (SCADA) and Public Address/Customer Information (PA/CIS) systems. The upgraded SCADA/PA/CIS will operate as an integrated system that monitors and controls operations and will allow Metro to provide real-time arrival information to passengers, such as live displays at stations.

== Previous proposals ==
Previously proposed extensions of the Blue Line are defunct; regional leaders have said their priority is the proposed Green Line expansion in the city of St. Louis.

=== Cross County ===
1. MetroSouth. This 6–12-mile (9.7–19.3 km) extension was envisioned as Cross County Segment 2 and would have extended the current Blue Line from its terminus in Shrewsbury further south beyond Interstates 270/255 to Butler Hill Road. A third alternative would have ended at Watson Road. An environmental impact study was completed in 2004; however, selection of an LPA was deferred due to the lack of local funding sources as well as other factors.
2. MetroNorth. This approximately 12-mile (19 km) extension was envisioned as Cross County Segment 3 and would have extended the current Blue Line from Clayton towards Florissant, Missouri. Some of this segment would have followed the former Terminal Railroad Association of St. Louis' Central Belt right-of-way paralleling Interstate 170.
3. Daniel Boone. This 8–10-mile (13–16 km) extension would have branched off the Cross County corridor near Olive Boulevard along disused Rock Island Railroad right-of-way. It would then turn west and follow existing trackage operated by Central Midland Railway to Page Avenue where the line would continue to Westport Plaza. An approximately 12-mile (19 km) extension to Chesterfield would have been a potential Phase 2 of the Daniel Boone branch. The alignment would have continued west following Page Avenue and Highway 364 then turning towards Creve Coeur Lake Memorial Park. From there it would have headed to Spirit of St. Louis Airport in the Chesterfield Valley.

== See also ==
- Bi-State Development Agency
- Green Line (MetroLink)
- Red Line (MetroLink)
- Metro Transit
- St. Clair County Transit District
- List of St. Louis MetroLink stations
