= Maplewood, Missouri =

- City
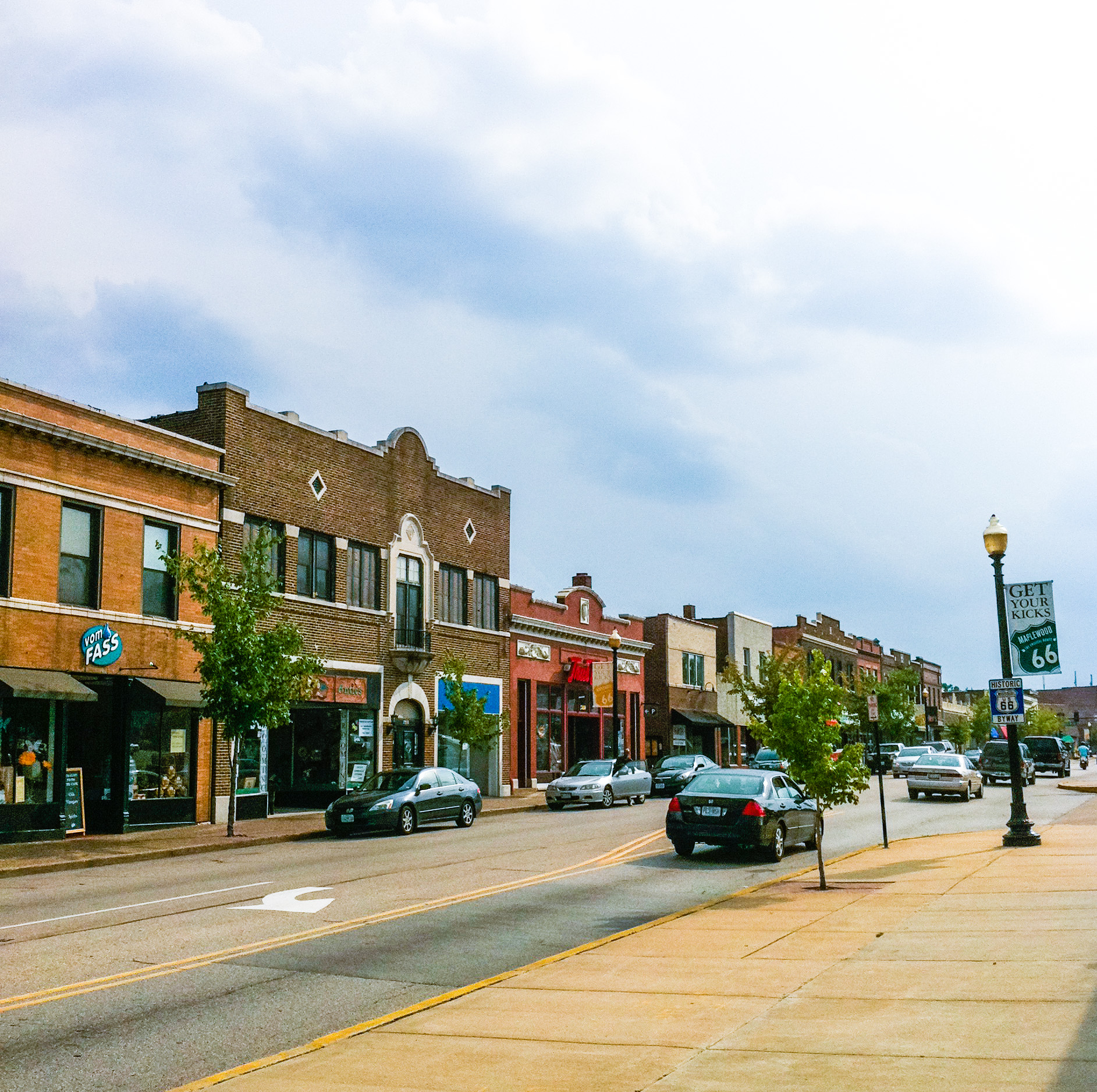
- Manchester Road passes through Maplewood, Missouri

- Location of Maplewood, Missouri
- Coordinates: 38°36′44″N 90°19′26″W
- Country: United States
- State: Missouri
- County: St. Louis

Government
  - Mayor: Barry Greenberg

Area
  - Total: 1.56 sq mi (4.05 km^{2})
  - Land: 1.56 sq mi (4.05 km^{2})
  - Water: 0 sq mi (0.00 km^{2})
- Elevation: 518 ft (158 m)

Population (2020)
  - Total: 8,269
  - Density: 5,283.8/sq mi (2,040.07/km^{2})
- Time zone: UTC-6 (Central (CST))
  - Summer (DST): UTC-5 (CDT)
- FIPS code: 29-45830
- GNIS feature ID: 2395847
- Website: City of Maplewood official website

Maplewood is an inner-ring suburb of St. Louis, located in St. Louis County, Missouri, United States. As of the 2020 census, Maplewood had a population of 8,269.

== History ==
Maplewood was established around the turn of the 20th century. Maplewood was one of the early suburbs of St. Louis. Located just outside the city limits, Maplewood was located at the end of one of St. Louis's streetcar lines and was also located near major railroads.

It was built as a bedroom community. Advertising suggested that people should get away from the city (in an era of common and sooty commercial, industrial, and domestic coal burning) and enjoy the fresh air of less densely populated areas like Maplewood. Maplewood's historic residential areas were mostly built from 1900 to 1910 and a number of well-preserved homes remain. Several of these homes have remained in the same family for generations.

Maplewood is currently being revitalized by an influx of restaurants, businesses, and shops around Manchester Ave., Sutton Ave., and the Greenwood Historic District.

Up until 2018, under a local nuisance ordinance, a person who called the police for domestic violence more than twice in 180 days could face eviction. In 2012, a woman was evicted from her home after she had called the police four times to request protection from physical assaults by her ex-boyfriend. She became homeless in the process. In 2017, the ACLU filed a lawsuit on behalf of the victim, claiming that the Maplewood nuisance ordinance violated the First Amendment right to petition the government for assistance, as well as the rights to travel, equal protection and due process. In 2018, the ordinance was revised to eliminate language that allowed officials to fine or evict people who were victims of crime.

In 2021, residents of Maplewood elected Nikylan Knapper as the city's first black mayor.

== Geography ==
According to the United States Census Bureau, the city has a total area of 1.56 square miles (4.04 km^{2}), all land.

== Demographics ==
Historical population
Census	Pop.	Note	%±
1910	4,976		—
1920	7,431		49.3%
1930	12,657		70.3%
1940	12,875		1.7%
1950	13,416		4.2%
1960	12,552		−6.4%
1970	12,785		1.9%
1980	10,960		−14.3%
1990	9,962		−9.1%
2000	9,228		−7.4%
2010	8,046		−12.8%
2020	8,269		2.8%
U.S. Decennial Census

=== Racial and ethnic composition ===
Maplewood city, Missouri – Racial and ethnic composition Note: the US Census treats Hispanic/Latino as an ethnic category. This table excludes Latinos from the racial categories and assigns them to a separate category. Hispanics/Latinos may be of any race.
Race / Ethnicity (NH = Non-Hispanic)	Pop 2000	Pop 2010	Pop 2020	% 2000	% 2010	% 2020
White alone (NH)	6,922	5,783	6,001	75.01%	71.87%	72.57%
Black or African American alone (NH)	1,461	1,381	1,084	15.83%	17.16%	13.11%
Native American or Alaska Native alone (NH)	28	16	14	0.30%	0.20%	0.17%
Asian alone (NH)	389	279	269	4.22%	3.47%	3.25%
Native Hawaiian or Pacific Islander alone (NH)	6	11	6	0.07%	0.14%	0.07%
Other race alone (NH)	12	15	42	0.13%	0.19%	0.51%
Mixed race or Multiracial (NH)	205	254	505	2.22%	3.16%	6.11%
Hispanic or Latino (any race)	205	307	348	2.22%	3.82%	4.21%
Total	9,228	8,046	8,269	100.00%	100.00%	100.00%

=== 2020 census ===
As of the 2020 census, Maplewood had a population of 8,269. The median age was 34.7 years. 17.8% of residents were under the age of 18 and 10.8% of residents were 65 years of age or older. For every 100 females there were 99.0 males, and for every 100 females age 18 and over there were 97.4 males age 18 and over.

The population density was 5,300.6 inhabitants per square mile (2,041.7/km^{2}).

100.0% of residents lived in urban areas, while 0.0% lived in rural areas.

There were 4,453 households in Maplewood, of which 19.6% had children under the age of 18 living in them. Of all households, 26.4% were married-couple households, 30.7% were households with a male householder and no spouse or partner present, and 34.1% were households with a female householder and no spouse or partner present. About 50.3% of all households were made up of individuals and 9.1% had someone living alone who was 65 years of age or older.

There were 4,842 housing units, of which 8.0% were vacant. The homeowner vacancy rate was 1.9% and the rental vacancy rate was 4.8%.

=== Income and poverty ===
The 2016–2020 5-year American Community Survey estimates show that the median household income was $49,833 (with a margin of error of +/- $6,469) and the median family income was $71,939 (+/- $4,544). Males had a median income of $40,494 (+/- $13,044) versus $38,790 (+/- $1,407) for females. The median income for those above 16 years old was $38,922 (+/- $1,549). Approximately, 10.4% of families and 11.3% of the population were below the poverty line, including 12.6% of those under the age of 18 and 18.6% of those ages 65 or over.

=== 2010 census ===
At the 2010 census there were 8,046 people, 4,269 households, and 1,769 families living in the city. The population density was 5,963.8 inhabitants per square mile (2,302.6/km^{2}). There were 4,889 housing units at an average density of 3,403.3 per square mile (1,314.0/km^{2}). The racial makeup of the city was 74.1% White, 17.2% African American, 0.2% Native American, 3.5% Asian, 0.1% Pacific Islander, 1.3% from other races, and 3.5% from two or more races. Hispanic or Latino of any race were 2.22%.

Of the 4,269 households 18.6% had children under the age of 18 living with them, 25.3% were married couples living together, 12.2% had a female householder with no husband present, and 58.6% were non-families. 48.6% of households were one person and 6.5% were one person aged 65 or older. The average household size was 1.88 and the average family size was 2.78.

The age distribution was 19.1% under the age of 20, 9.1% from 20 to 24, 37.0% from 25 to 44, 26.9% from 45 to 64, and 7.9% 65 or older. The median age was 34.7 years. The city was 50.2% male and 49.8% female.

=== 2000 census ===
At the 2000 census there were 9,228 people, 4,815 households, and 2,041 families living in the city. The population density was 5,963.8 inhabitants per square mile (2,302.6/km^{2}). There were 5,266 housing units at an average density of 3,403.3 per square mile (1,314.0/km^{2}). The racial makeup of the city was 76.16% White, 15.93% African American, 0.33% Native American, 4.23% Asian, 0.07% Pacific Islander, 0.72% from other races, and 2.58% from two or more races. Hispanic or Latino of any race were 2.22%.

Of the 4,815 households 19.1% had children under the age of 18 living with them, 27.1% were married couples living together, 81.6% had a female householder with no husband present, and 5.6% were non-families. 4.5% of households were one person and 7.5% were one person aged 65 or older. The average household size was 1.92 and the average family size was 2.83.

The age distribution was 18.3% under the age of 18, 13.0% from 18 to 24, 39.0% from 25 to 44, 20.6% from 45 to 64, and 9.1% 65 or older. The median age was 34 years. For every 100 females, there were 99.6 males. For every 100 females age 18 and over, there were 98.7 males.

In 2000 The median household income was $29,151, and the median family income was $44,178. Males had a median income of $30,279 versus $24,025 for females. The per capita income for the city was $19,087. About 10.6% of families and 14.1% of the population were below the poverty line, including 17.5% of those under age 18 and 9.1% of those age 65 or over.

== Government ==
Since 1978, Maplewood has utilized a charter form of government with a council-manager government structure. The mayor of Maplewood is elected at large by the community and serves a three-year term. As of April 2024, the current mayor is Barry Greenberg. The City Manager is the administrative head of the city, whereas the Mayor acts as a member of the City Council, but has no veto power.

== Transportation ==
=== Public transportation ===
Maplewood is served by the Blue Line of the St. Louis region's MetroLink light rail system. The city has two stations, Maplewood-Manchester and Sunnen. Metro Transit also operates the Maplewood Transit Center located on Manchester Road. It connects the Maplewood-Manchester light rail station with MetroBus routes and paratransit services.

=== Major roads and highways ===
Major arterial routes in Maplewood include Big Bend Boulevard, Hanley Road, and Manchester Road. Hanley Road turns into Laclede Station Road just before entering Shrewsbury to the south while Interstate 44 passes Maplewood just south of the city limits near Deer Creek.

== Schools ==
Public education in Maplewood is administered by the Maplewood Richmond Heights School District, which operates Maplewood Richmond Heights High School.

Maplewood has a lending library, the Maplewood Public Library.

== Notable people ==
- Mark Christman, baseball player
- Paul Christman, Pro football
- Ray Kennedy, jazz pianist
- Pee Wee Russell, jazz musician, was born in Maplewood
- Tershawn Wharton, Defensive Tackle for the Kansas City Chiefs

== See also ==
- 1939 St. Louis smog, an example of what levels pollution could rise to in nearby St. Louis
- Schlafly Bottleworks, Maplewood branch of the Saint Louis Brewery and a restaurant
