= Shrewsbury–Lansdowne I-44 station =

Light rail station in Missouri, US

Shrewsbury–Lansdowne I-44
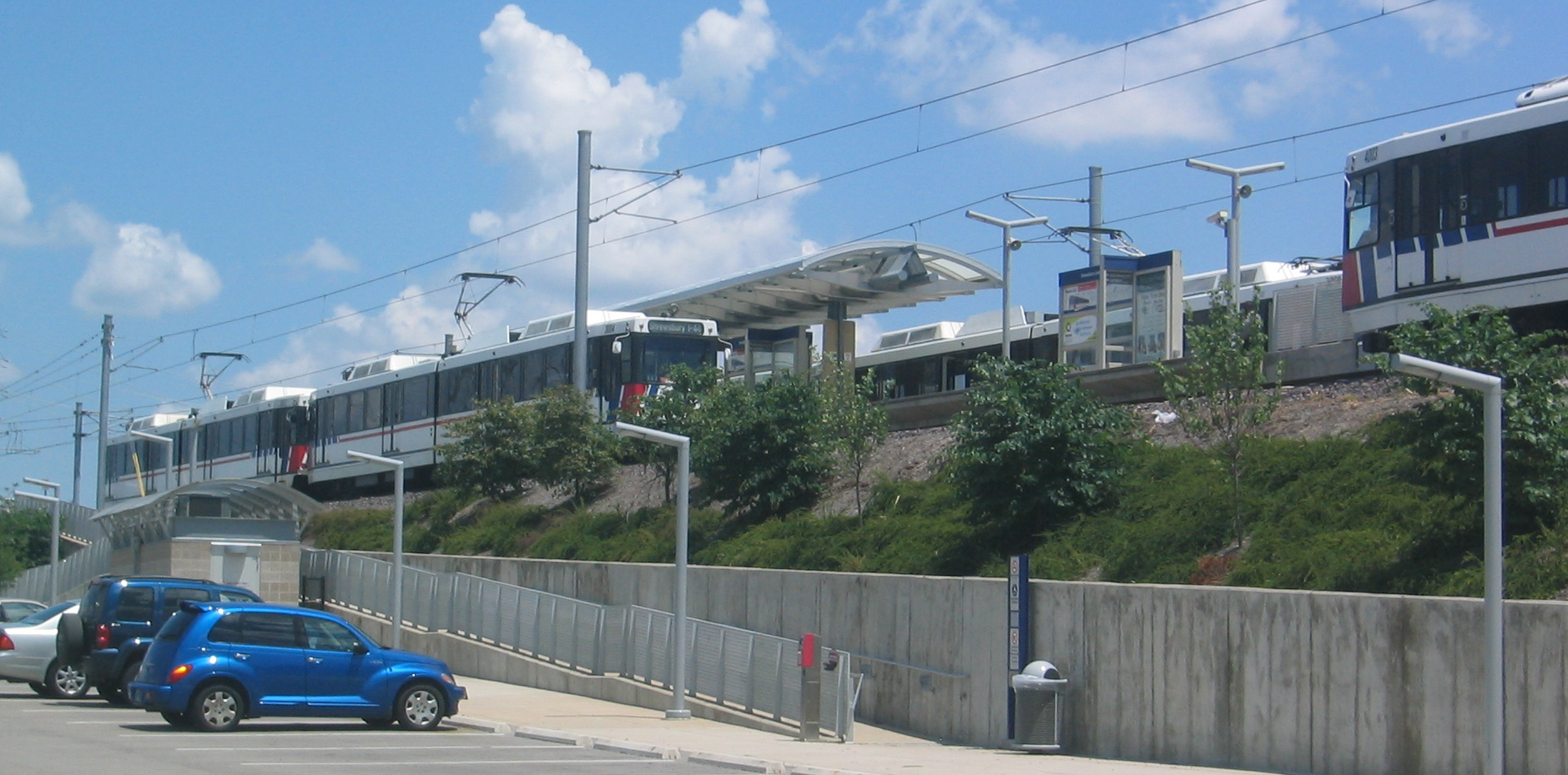
- Shrewsbury station in 2008

General information
- Location: 7201 Lansdowne Avenue; St. Louis, Missouri
- Coordinates: 38.59366°N 90.31947°W
- Owner: Bi-State Development Agency
- Operator: Metro Transit
- Platforms: 1 island platform
- Tracks: 2
- Bus stands: 9
- Connections: MetroBus Missouri: 09, 11, 16, 21, 30, 56

Construction
- Structure type: Embankment
- Parking: 825 spaces
- Cycle facilities: Racks, River Des Peres Greenway
- Accessible: Yes

History
- Opened: August 26, 2006

Passengers
- 2018: 1,523 daily
- Rank: 8 out of 38

Services
Preceding station	MetroLink	Following station
Terminus	Blue Line	Sunnen toward Fairview Heights
Location

Shrewsbury–Lansdowne I-44 station is a light rail station on the Blue Line of the St. Louis MetroLink system. This station is located on an embankment near Lansdowne Avenue and River Des Peres Boulevard in St. Louis near its boundary with Shrewsbury in St. Louis County. The city limits between the two communities runs through the northern portion of the 800 space park and ride lot.

The station is also a large MetroBus transfer and is equipped with a kiss and ride area and 25 long term spaces.

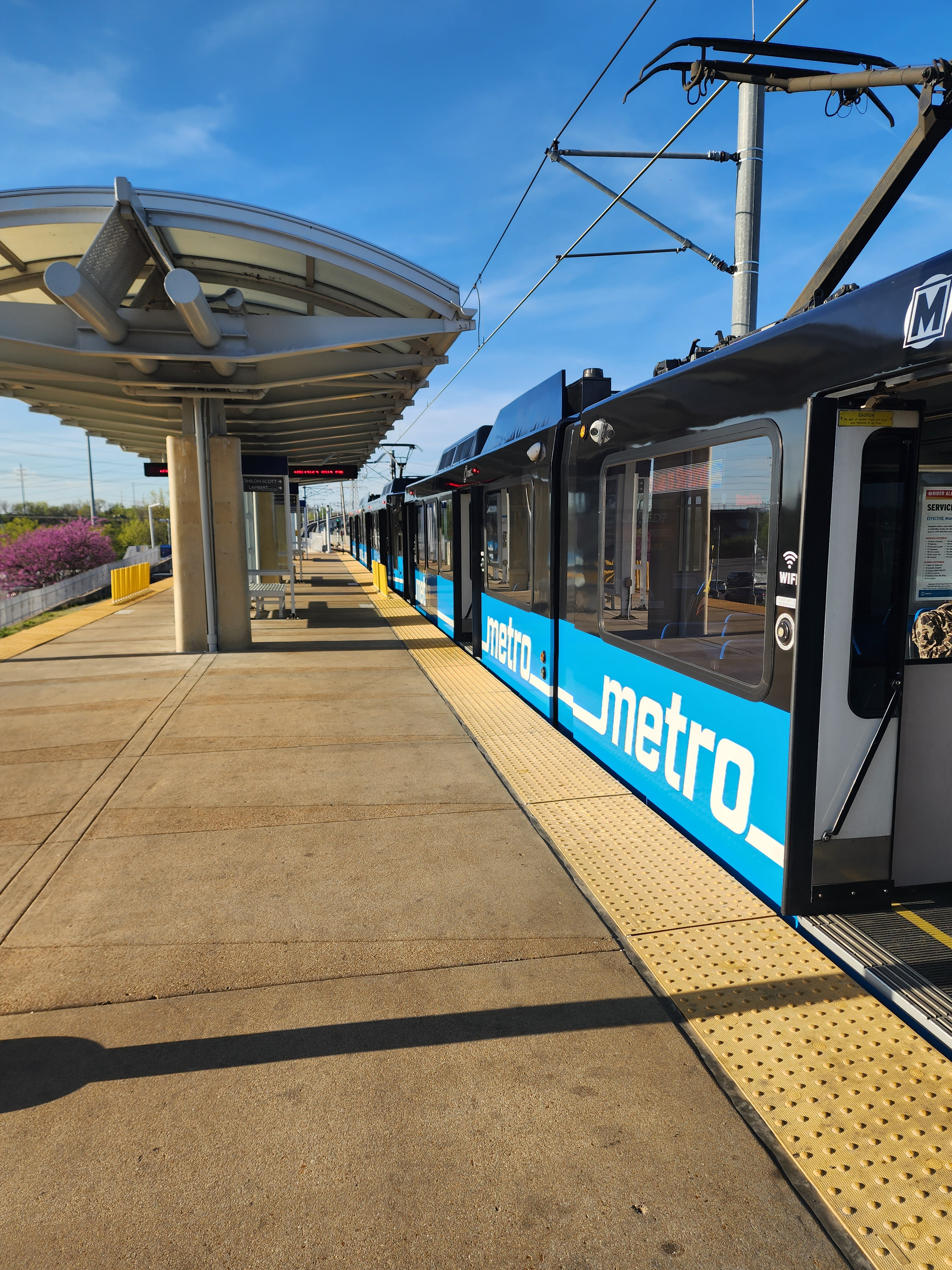
Shrewsbury-Lansdowne I-44 platform

== Station layout ==
The station has an island platform that is accessed by a staircase and switchback ramp on the north end of the platform and an elevator and another staircase on the south end.

== Bus connections ==
The following MetroBus lines serve Shrewsbury station:

- 09 Oakville
- 11 Chippewa
- 16 City Limits
- 21 Watson Road
- 30 Arsenal
- 56 Kirkwood-Webster

== Public artwork ==
In 2006, Metro's Arts in Transit program commissioned the sculpture Aquilone by Doug Hollis for installation on the embankment next to the station. The steel and aluminum sculptures are composed of tetrahedral wind-vanes that frame smaller, perforated wind sails that rotate independently, animating the entire surface. The whole piece turns into the wind as the nine sculptures dance with each other.

In 2014, the Arts in Transit program commissioned a second sculpture for the station by artist Ben Fehrmann called London. It's made out of 900, 13-foot tall stainless steel rods and was placed in the station's passenger plaza.

== Notable places nearby ==
- River Des Peres Greenway
- River Des Peres Park
- Ted Drewes Frozen Custard

== Previous extension proposal ==
The platform at this station is designed to accommodate a future extension, either via the River Des Peres to the southeast or more southerly toward South County Center. Called MetroSouth, this extension was originally Segment 2 of the Cross County corridor. Currently, there are no plans to advance studies on this alignment as the region focuses on a route within the city of St. Louis that would run primarily on Jefferson and Natural Bridge avenues.
