= Fairview Heights station (MetroLink) =

Light rail station in St. Clair County, Illinois, US

Fairview Heights

General information
- Location: 9720 West Illinois Route 161; Fairview Heights, Illinois
- Coordinates: 38.593617°N 90.047835°W
- Owner: Bi-State Development
- Operator: Metro Transit
- Platforms: 1 island platform
- Tracks: 2
- Bus stands: 7
- Connections: MetroBus Illinois: 01, 06, 12, 13

Construction
- Structure type: At-grade
- Parking: 898 spaces
- Cycle facilities: Racks, MetroBikeLink Trail
- Accessible: Yes

History
- Opened: May 5, 2001

Passengers
- 2018: 1,611 daily
- Rank: 7 out of 38

Services
Preceding station	MetroLink	Following station
Washington Park toward Shrewsbury–Lansdowne I-44	Blue Line	Terminus
Washington Park toward Lambert Airport Terminal 1	Red Line	Memorial Hospital toward Shiloh–Scott
Location

Fairview Heights station is a light rail station on the Red and Blue lines of the St. Louis MetroLink system. This at-grade station is located on the western edge of Fairview Heights, Illinois near the intersection of St. Clair Avenue and Illinois Route 161. It is the eastern terminus of the Blue Line and has a pocket track allowing Blue Line trains to reverse directions and layover between runs.

Fairview Heights is primarily a commuter station with 898 park and ride spaces and a large MetroBus transfer.

In 2024, the area between the bus bays and MetroLink entrance was updated with vibrantly colored elements in a “Love Where You Live” theme, including large shade structures, seating, trees, planters and banners. The sixth "Transit Stop Transformation" project to be completed, it was unveiled on August 21, 2024 by Citizens for Modern Transit, AARP in St. Louis, and Metro Transit in partnership with several local agencies.

== Station layout ==
The island platform is accessed via a single ramp on its west end that connects to the bus boarding area and park and ride lot.

== Bus connections ==
The following MetroBus lines serve Fairview Heights station:

- 01 Main Street-State Street
- 06 Rosemont
- 12 O'Fallon-Fairview Heights
- 13 Caseyville

== MetroBikeLink ==
Fairview Heights is the northernmost station served by the St. Clair County Transit District's MetroBikeLink shared-use path system. This 3.5-mile (5.6 km) section opened in 2019 and follows former CSX right-of-way and Schoenberger Creek through the hills of the Dutch Hollow area of Belleville and Fairview Heights. This section of trail connects to the other 11.5 miles (18.5 km) of MetroBikeLink for a total of 14 miles (23 km) of paved trails along MetroLink in St. Clair County, Illinois.
