= LGBTQ culture in St. Louis =

LGBTQ culture in St. Louis is characterized by a long history of progressive activism as well as racial divisions and the city/county divide. The city of St. Louis is relatively liberal, with multiple gayborhoods and several LGBTQ organizations. In 2019, Realtor.com dubbed St. Louis the 8th most LGBTQ-friendly city. However, due to hostile legislation at the state level, it has become common for LGBTQ residents to relocate to Illinois for better protections and healthcare access.

Recorded history and resource flow tend to prioritize white individuals and the city's central corridor, creating a perception of LGBTQ culture in St. Louis that does not always align with regional demographics. For the purposes of this article, St. Louis describes the Greater St. Louis metropolitan area, which includes neighboring counties in Missouri and Illinois.

== Pride festivals ==
There are three different LGBTQ Pride festivals every year in St. Louis city. St. Louis PrideFest takes place at Soldiers' Memorial downtown over two days in the last weekend of June. PrideFest previously took place in Tower Grove Park with a parade on South Grand Avenue until 2013. Neighborhood residents established Tower Grove Pride to continue the neighborhood festivities, which annually occurs on the Saturday of the same weekend. St. Louis Black Pride takes place in August, and is believed to be the second oldest Black pride in the country. The first Trans & Gender-Free Pride March preceded the PrideFest and Tower Grove celebrations in June 2019.

Other pride festivals in the metro area include Pride St. Charles in St. Charles, Missouri and Metro East PrideFest in Belleville, Illinois.

== Legal protections ==
In 2019, Missouri was ranked in the lowest category of the HRC state equality index, "High Priority to Achieve Basic Equality", with 28 other states. The statewide laws and policies identified as beneficial for LGBTQ populations are hate crime laws, a non-discrimination law specific to college and universities, non-discrimination policy for state employees on the basis of sexual orientation, an anti-cyberbullying law, transgender inclusion in sports, and changes for name and gender marker on drivers licenses.

St. Louis City Ordinance No. 67119 extends the city's anti-discrimination policy to protect individuals on the basis of gender identity and sexuality. The Civil Rights Enforcement Agency (CREA) is responsible for processing claims.

St. Louis County also has anti-discrimination protections for LGBTQ residents. In 2017, a sergeant in St. Louis County Police Department filed an EEOC discrimination lawsuit alleging that he was told to "tone down your gayness" in order to be eligible for promotion. Shortly thereafter he was transferred to another precinct and assigned to night shift. St. Louis County argued against the case on the basis that discrimination against sexual minorities is not illegal in Missouri. The officer agreed to a $10.25 million settlement in 2020.

== History ==
=== Pre-1950 ===
Prior to European colonization, the region was inhabited by members of the Mississippian, Illini, Missouria, and Osage peoples. Understandings of gender and sexuality differ among indigenous cultures. While much ancestral knowledge has been lost through colonization and forced assimilation, it is known that the Osage recognized Mixu'ga, one of the identities under the modern two-spirit umbrella. Despite the Indian Removal Act and other attempts to displace indigenous people, members of the Osage nation continue to reside in the area and are working to preserve Sugarloaf Mound.

A St. Louis medical textbook publisher released The Story of a Life, the first recognized American homosexual autobiography, in 1901. The author, using the pseudonym Claude Hartland, wrote about his mental health and experiences with doctors related to sexuality and gender identity as well as descriptions of homosexual social life in downtown St. Louis.

=== 1950–1960s ===
In the late 1950s, a competition for "female impersonators" called Miss Fannie's Ball was organized by the Jolly Jesters social club, with proceeds going to St. Louis African American institutions. The event is a continuing annual Halloween night celebration that has been hosted at various venues, including Masonic Prince Hall Grand Lodge and Chase Park Plaza.

During the Halloween festivities of 1969, nine young people were arrested without explanation while leaving the Onyx Room, one of the most popular gay bars of the time. At the station they were charged for "masquerading" (i.e. appearing publicly in women's clothing). Dressing in clothing not in accordance with one's perceived sex had been prohibited by a municipal ordinance since 1864. Arrests at LGBTQ establishments were common, but the events of that Halloween ignited the first recorded protest by gay activists in St. Louis. The Mandrake Society, the first gay rights group of St. Louis, mobilized the community. They spread news of the arrests by phone to gather supporters at police headquarters, assisted with bail, and hired legal representation. The charges were eventually dropped, marking a significant victory for St. Louis gay rights activists. The 1969 Halloween arrests are sometimes referred to as "St. Louis' Stonewall" because of its importance as a flash-point of community resistance and organization.

In 1968, Laud Humphreys presented his research on male-male sexual activities in public restrooms in Forest Park, later published as the controversial Tearoom Trade.

=== 1970–1980s ===
Places known to be gathering sites for lesbians, including a bar and coffeehouse in south city, were firebombed in the 1970s.

In 1972, Goldstein Johnson challenged the city's masquerading law with support from the ACLU of Missouri. Johnson had been arrested twice and served 45 days at the city workhouse for wearing women's clothes. Johnson was murdered before a decision could be made. More than 200 masquerading arrests were made from 1970 up to when the law was successfully overturned in 1986 with plaintiff Michael Shreves, also known as drag queen Michelle McCausland.

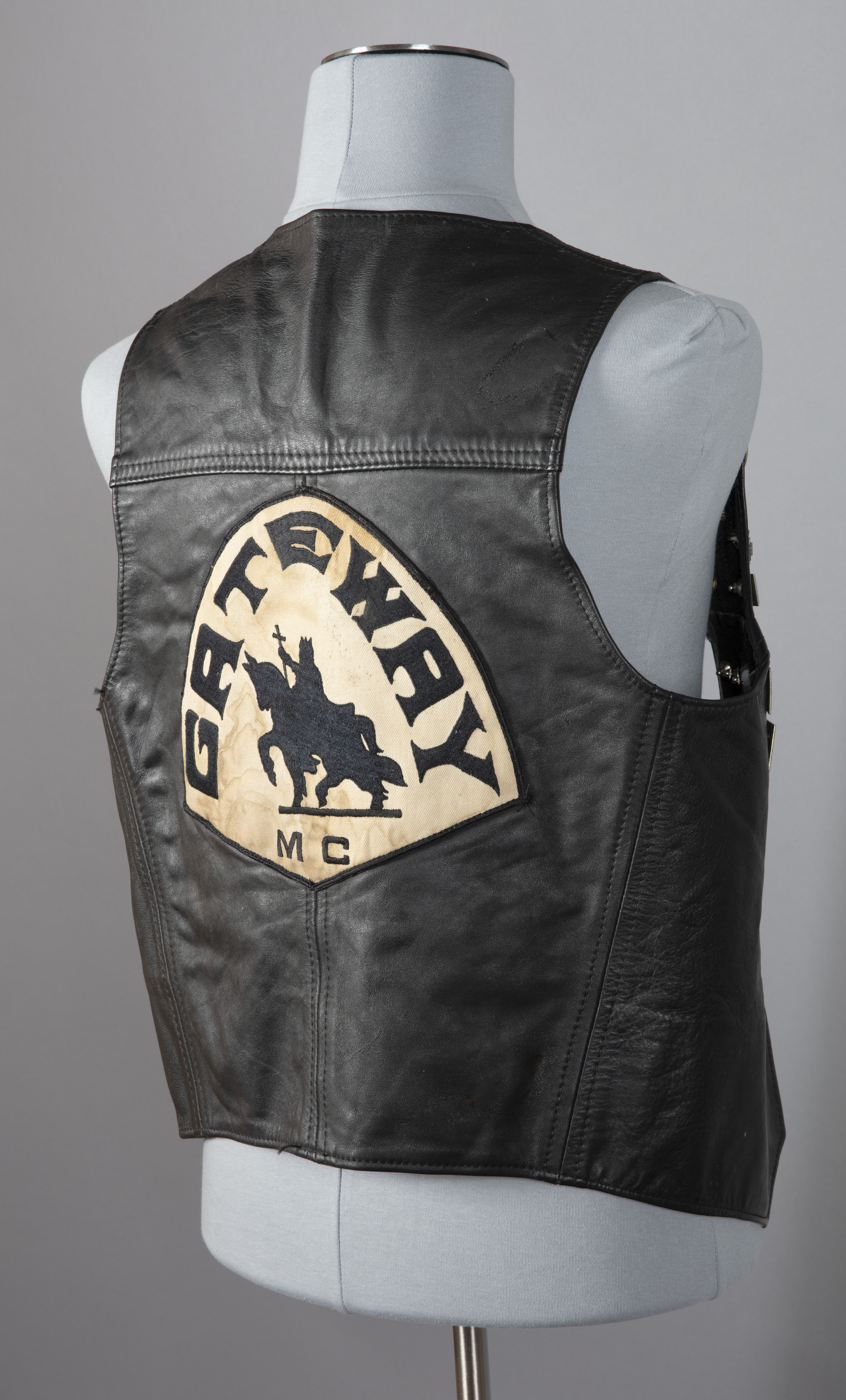
Leather vest with Gateway Motorcycle Club patch on the back

The Gateway Motorcycle Club was a LGBTQ biker club associated with leather subculture based in St. Louis. It was established in 1973 and remained active until 2014. The name of the group came from the Gateway Arch in St. Louis.

Various pride marches and demonstrations were organized throughout the 1970s. Chuck Charleston, a bartender at Red Bull in East St. Louis, organized a procession of cars that ended in a large gathering in Forest Park in 1971. Student organizations held celebrations and hosted nationally known activists at Washington University in St. Louis and Southern Illinois University Edwardsville. Metropolitan Community Church in St. Louis was established in 1972 with a mission to serve the gay and lesbian community. The church served as a center for organizing and hosted a gay pride rally in 1977. The first city sanctioned Celebration of Lesbian and Gay Pride occurred April 12–20, 1980, with a full week of activities, ending with the landmark Walk for Charity and Rally. Sponsors included community and ally businesses as well as religious organizations. Some participants used pseudonyms or wore disguises in fear of reprisal.

St. Louis Effort for AIDS was established by volunteers in 1985, raising money to support people affected by HIV/AIDS through Dining Out For Life and drag shows.

In 1989, the organization Blacks Assisting Blacks Against AIDS (BABAA) was established to educate the St. Louis African American community about HIV/AIDS. They later found a physical office and did educational outreach, including distributing condoms at clubs.

=== 1990–2000s ===
In 1990, the St. Louis Gender Foundation began public outreach, including HIV/AIDS education and a booth at Pride. They had previously met privately as Tri-Ess or the Gateway Femmes.

University of Missouri–St. Louis was among the first to recognize LGBTQ History Month, founded by graduate student Rodney Wilson in 1994.

In 1995, BABAA and other African American community members organized the B-Boy Blues Festival, and in 1999 established the annual St. Louis Black Pride.

=== 2000–present ===
The Pride Center, located between the Grove neighborhood and Grand, opened in 2017 under St. Louis PrideFest and closed at the end of 2021 citing financial issues related to the COVID-19 pandemic. The organization had previous operated an LGBTQ Center in the Grove that closed in 2014.

In 2023, Mayor Tishaura Jones designated October 22 as "St. Louis Vogue Day."

In 2024, the Missouri History Museum featured the exhibit Gateway to Pride.

== Gayborhoods ==
=== Historical ===
St. Louis's gayborhoods have a rocky history at best. In the mid-twentieth century, gay neighborhoods were shaped by redlining and white flight. Due to discriminatory practices and social marginalization, white gay establishments emerged in the liminal spaces between predominately white and predominately black neighborhoods. Laud Humphreys described such areas as "gay ghettos" where black neighborhoods provided the protection of anonymity to white gay men. Black gays and lesbians lacked such privilege and also faced discrimination from their white counterparts that often limited their socializing to private parties. For all LGBTQ St. Louisans then, employment and housing discrimination often excluded them from the suburbs or affluent neighborhoods.

==== Midtown ====
This neighborhood includes the former entertainment district known as Gaslight Square. From the 1930s to the 1970s, Grand and Olive was the most continuously popular part of the city for lesbian and gay establishments. Among them was Dante's Inferno, one of the oldest identified gay bars in St. Louis, notorious for hosting drag shows. The gay bars were in close proximity to Black residential neighborhoods, however many businesses refused to serve black clientele. The bar Zebra marketed itself as a multiracial space, "a beautiful blend of black and white." This area was also the site of the Onyx Room police raid.

==== Central West End ====
During the 1950s to 1970s, the Central West End also became a hub for LGBTQ nightlife and came to be known as St. Louis's original gayborhood. In 1969 the Mandrake Society was founded in the Central West End. They, and other homophile organizations, often met at Trinity Episcopal Church in the early 70s. "The Center," operated by the Metropolitan Life Services Corporation, was located at 4940 McPherson Avenue and hosted a library, community meetings, and counseling services from 1976 to 1978. The vegetarian cafe collective Sunshine Inn operated in the neighborhood 1972-1998 and hosted the 1987 national meeting for National Coalition of Black Lesbians and Gays.

From the 1970s through the 1990s, however, the Central West End was subject to gentrification. As a result, members of the LGBTQ community moved away from the area and many LGBTQ establishments were forced to close. Coffee Cartel was closely aligned with the community and frequent sponsor of LGBTQ events until its closure in 2018. LGBTQ-owned Left Bank Books has been located on Euclid Avenue since 1969.

==== North St. Louis ====
Northside establishments primarily catering to black gays and lesbians included 1960s Bills Bar and Grill, which was a critical venue for Ethel Sawyer's sociology masters thesis, “A Study of a Public Lesbian Community.”

=== Present-day ===
==== The Grove ====
Between the 1990s and 2010s, the Grove, in Forest Park Southeast, became the "heir apparent" to the Central West End's LGBTQ club scene. Although the Grove remains the most high-profile gayborhood in St. Louis, the rise of mainstream venues and other markers of gentrification have raised alarms among the LGBTQ community that the history of the Central West End may be repeating itself. In addition to gay bars, the Pride Center and Transgender Memorial Garden are located in the neighborhood.

==== Tower Grove ====
The neighborhoods around Tower Grove Park have long been a popular area for LGBTQ residents. The organizing group of the 1980 pride activities was the Magnolia Committee, named after Magnolia Street on the north side of the park. In addition to the annual Tower Grove Pride festivities, many LGBTQ businesses line the street on South Grand.

==== Soulard ====
Until 2014, the longest operating gay bar in St. Louis, Clementines, was located in Soulard. Clementines was one of several gay bars to be established in Soulard in the 1970s and 1980s, when many buildings in the neighborhood were abandoned and property values were low. Many bars in the area are gay-friendly and host drag shows. The St. Louis Metropolitan Community Church is also in Soulard.

==== Carondelet ====
Several gay bars line South Broadway in the Carondelet neighborhood. It is also the original home of the Sisters of St. Joseph of Carondelet who were early advocates for LGBTQ inclusion and continue to actively support the transgender community.

==== Metro East ====
The former glory of the Metro East St. Louis nightclub scene included bars that catered to LGBTQ clientele, including an active ballroom and drag scene. New bars and social institutions have since been established, and a small community is growing in Alton, Illinois. The first Alton Pride Fall Festival was planned for October 2020, but did not occur until 2022 due to the COVID-19 pandemic.

== Organizations and community institutions ==
=== Community and advocacy ===
The St. Louis LGBTQ Chamber of Commerce, formerly the Gateway Business Guild, is an affiliate of the National LGBT Chamber of Commerce and arranges networking opportunities for LGBTQ professionals and businesses.

The St. Louis LGBT History Project is an initiative partnered with archives and museums to collect and preserve community history.

The Metro Trans Umbrella Group (MTUG) is a non-profit with support groups, social events, and other support to the transgender community in the St. Louis metro area.

St. Louis has a PFLAG chapter, established in 1977. It is a support group meetings for parents, family members, and LGBTQ community members.

Pride St. Louis runs the annual St. Louis PrideFest.

PROMO is a statewide advocacy group for LGBTQ issues. The St. Louis office includes the local Services & Advocacy for GLBT Elders (SAGE) affiliate.

The St. Louis Queer+ Support Helpline (SQSH) is a resource helpline for community queer support.

The Shades Project supports the health, arts, diversity, education, and safe spaces of queer and trans people of color and their supporters and loved ones.

St. Louis has TransParent local chapters, support groups for families of transgender children and teenagers.

=== Recreation ===
There are a number of sports clubs and leagues that serve or align with the St. Louis community. Team St. Louis organizes various leagues and works with the international Gay Games. Other popular sports among the community include softball, swimming, rugby, cycling, bowling, darts, and others.

St. Louis has a history of illustrious ball culture and drag performance that continues to thrive. It is said to be among the ballroom top ten cities in the US.

Community oriented choirs include the Black Tulip Chorale, CHARIS Women's Chorus, and the Gateway Men's Chorus. BandTogether is a community centered band and color guard.

=== Health ===
St. Louis Effort for AIDS is a non-profit AIDS service organization providing education and support services for those impacted.

The Queer & Trans Wellness Clinic at Saint Louis University offers an array of mental health and community support services.

Rustin's Place, named after civil rights activist Bayard Rustin, is a community center focused on supporting the Black LGBT community in areas of education, wellness, and community.

The Spot provides mental and physical health services in an LGBTQ affirming environment for teenagers and young adults.

- Steps Alano is an LGBT affirming center that hosts 12 step recovery programs in Tower Grove South.

The Transgender Center at St. Louis Children's Hospital supports transgender youth, employing specialists with backgrounds in medical care, mental health, education, and social support. The clinic stopped services for puberty blockers or other hormone therapy in 2023.

== Media ==
=== Ongoing ===
#Boom Magazine was founded in 2014 and partners with the Gateway Business Guild and LGBTQ Nation.

Out in STL is a queer magazine for all of St. Louis. It covers news, politics, people, and trends relevant to St. Louis's LGBTQ communities.

=== Historical publications ===
Mandrake, organized by the Mandrake Society, was the first LGBTQ publication in St. Louis and ran from 1970 to 1972.

In 1973, the Lesbian Alliance began publishing a newsletter entitled Moonstorm, which ran until 1980.

The Gay News-Telegraph (later known as the Lesbian and Gay News-Telegraph), ceased publication in 2000.

Vital Voice magazine shut down in 2020.

== Notable people ==
- Rasheen Aldridge Jr., activist and politician, represented St. Louis in Missouri Legislature and currently serves as Alderman in the 14th ward.
- Josephine Baker, the performer, desegregation activist, and spy, was born in St. Louis. Her relationships with women are well-documented.
- Jonica Booth, bisexual actress from Rap Shit and Bad Girls Club
- William S. Burroughs, writer of the Beat Generation, grew up in St. Louis and attended John Burroughs School (allegedly no relation). Although his family provided a privileged suburban lifestyle, Burroughs sought out "seedier" aspects of the urban landscape, such as sewers, skid row, and frequent visits with sex workers. These impressions manifest in many of his works, and he was dismayed to see the "redeveloped" St. Louis on a return in 1965. He described the Arch grounds construction as "ominous... like the only landmark to survive an atomic blast."
- Mike Colona, former Missouri House Representative, was appointed Associate Circuit Judge by Governor Mike Parson. As Representative, Colona unsuccessfully introduced bills to legalize same-sex marriage and to secede St. Louis from the state of Missouri.
- 20th-century author Emma Crow was born in St. Louis, where she began her relationship with Charlotte Cushman.
- Lea DeLaria, actress widely known for her role in Orange Is the New Black, grew up in Belleville, Illinois and attended the first Pride in St. Louis. She was arrested for "open and notorious homosexuality" in Missouri and spent a night in jail.
- Maxi Glamour, a non-binary drag artist who competed on The Boulet Brothers' Dragula, started their drag career in St. Louis and is an organizer for queer community building and political education.
- Nathan Lee Graham, accomplished actor and singer born and raised in St. Louis.
- Harriet Hosmer, the most distinguished female sculptor in the United States during the 19th century, attended Missouri Medical College.
- Fannie Hurst grew up in St. Louis and studied at Washington University in St. Louis, then went on to become an author, civil rights activist, and the host one of the first television shows to provide a mainstream platform for the gay community in the 1950s.
- Laud Humphreys began his sociological career at Washington University and conducted research for the Tearoom Trade in Forest Park.
- David Jay, founder of Asexual Visibility and Education Network (AVEN).
- Internationally renowned circus performer Omar Kingsley, better known as Ella Zoyara, was born in St. Louis.
- V. E. Schwab, fantasy author, lived in St. Louis while studying at Washington University in St. Louis.
- Tennessee Williams, famous playwright, moved to St. Louis as a child and graduated from University City High School.
- Sculptor and silverpoint artist Thelma Wood studied at Washington University in St. Louis. Djuna Barnes would go on to fictionalize their relationship in Nightwood, which is frequently considered one of the great Modernist novels, as well as one of the early prominent novels to explicitly depict a sexual relationship between women.
