= List of events in Rome =

As the capital of Italy and one of the most popular tourist destinations in the world, Rome is one of the most eventful Italian cities throughout the year.

== Festivity ==
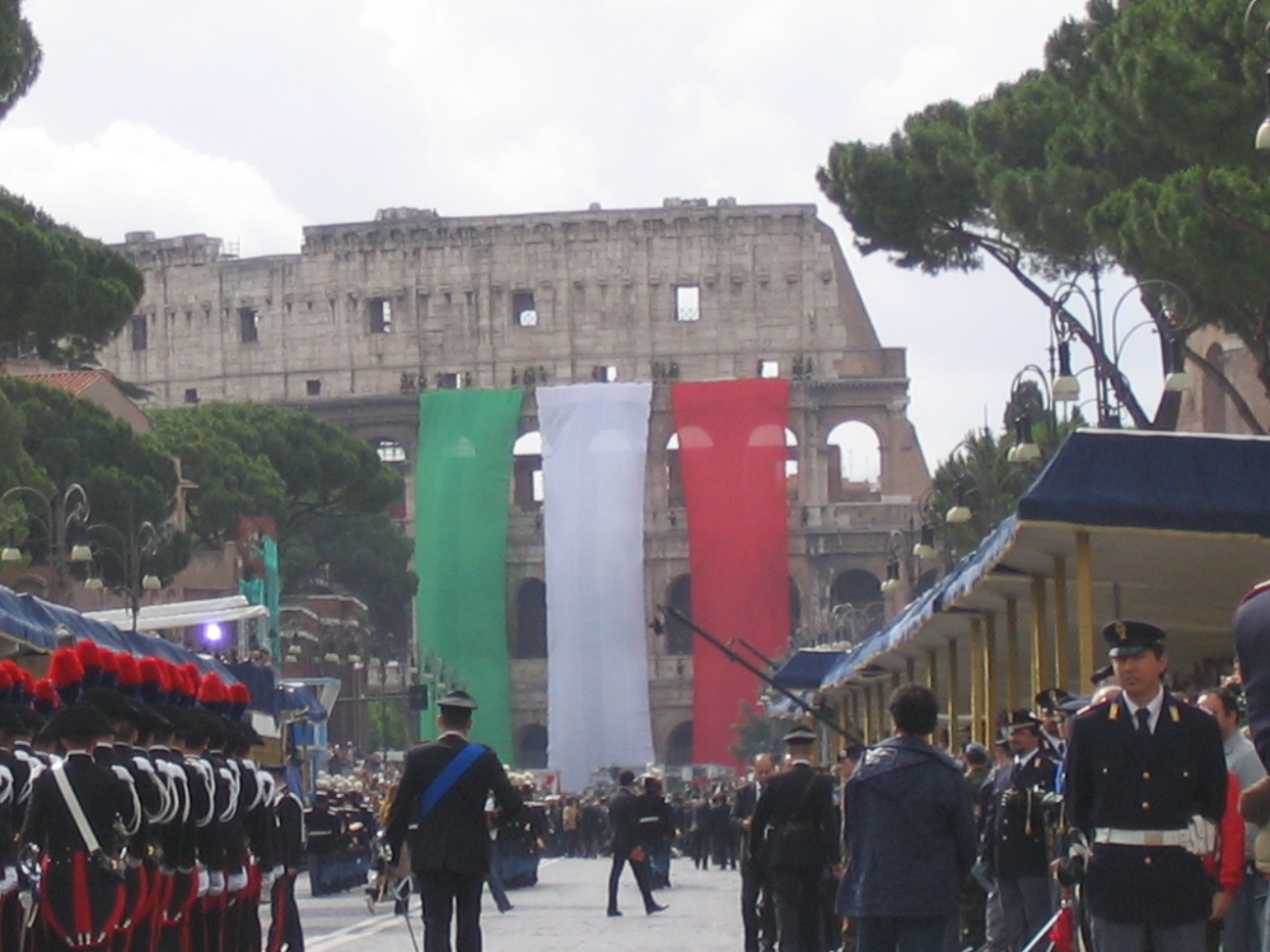
Republic Day 2 June 2007

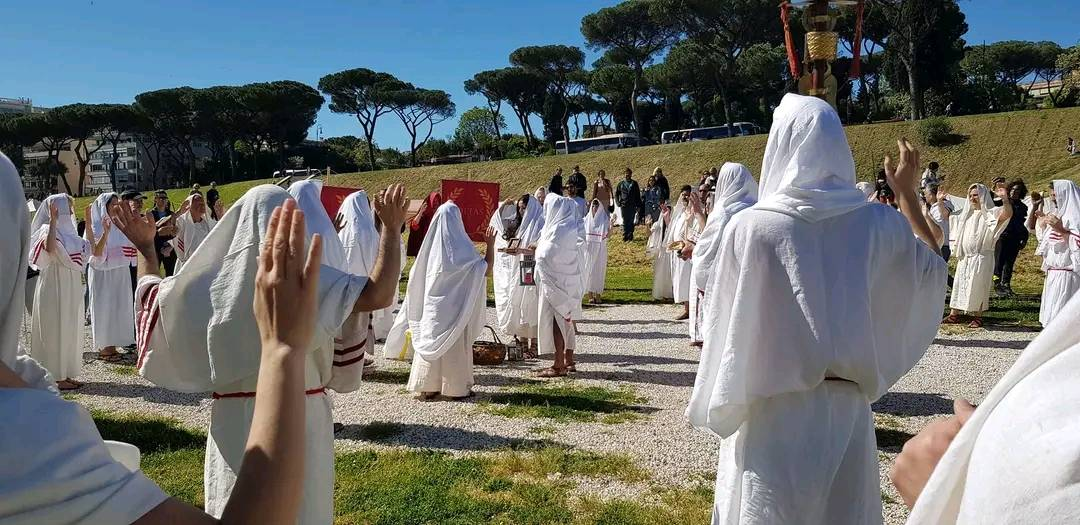
Celebration of the 2777th Natale di Roma at the Circus Maximus

- Natale di Roma (Christmas of Rome), April 21; it is the date on which, according to tradition, Romulus founded the city (753 BC). April 21 is celebrated with religious rites, costume performances, cultural events and recreational events;
- April 25, Liberation Day: commemorates the end of the fascist regime and the Nazi occupation during the World War II, as well as the victory of the Italian resistance movement of partisans who opposed the regime. On April 25, state museums and archaeological sites in Rome and throughout Italy open for free;
- May 1, Labour Day: the italian trade unions organize a free concert in the square of Porta San Giovanni in Laterano, attended by hundreds of thousands of spectators;
- Republic Day, June 2; the traditional military parade takes place along Via dei Fori Imperiali, with the "Frecce Tricolori" of the Italian Air Force. It is one of the most heartfelt by the population, despite the fact that, for historical reasons, it has existed for less than a century. It is a secular holiday established, as can be easily deduced from the name, to commemorate the birth of the Republic in Italy;
- Feast of Saints Peter and Paul, patron saints of the city, on 29 June, this event in Rome is celebrated by a fireworks display, called "Girandola", normally in Castel Sant'Angelo or in Piazza del Popolo;
- Festa de Noantri, takes place in Trastevere. It is celebrated on the first Saturday after July 16, it is a Christian religious holiday celebrated in honor of the Virgin of Carmel, on the occasion of her liturgical anniversary;
- Ferragosto, August 15: feast of the Assumption of Mary;
- All Saints' Day, November 1;
- Feast of the Immaculate Conception, December 8: celebrates the Immaculate Conception of the Blessed Virgin Mary, on this day the traditional Christmas tree of Rome is lit in Piazza Venezia, marking the beginning of the city's Christmas period, due to the work on the new metro line C, the lighting ceremony and the location of the tree was temporarily moved to Piazza del Popolo. The Pope, in his capacity as Bishop of Rome, visits the Column of the Immaculate Conception in Piazza di Spagna to offer expiatory prayers commemorating the solemn event.

=== Festival ===
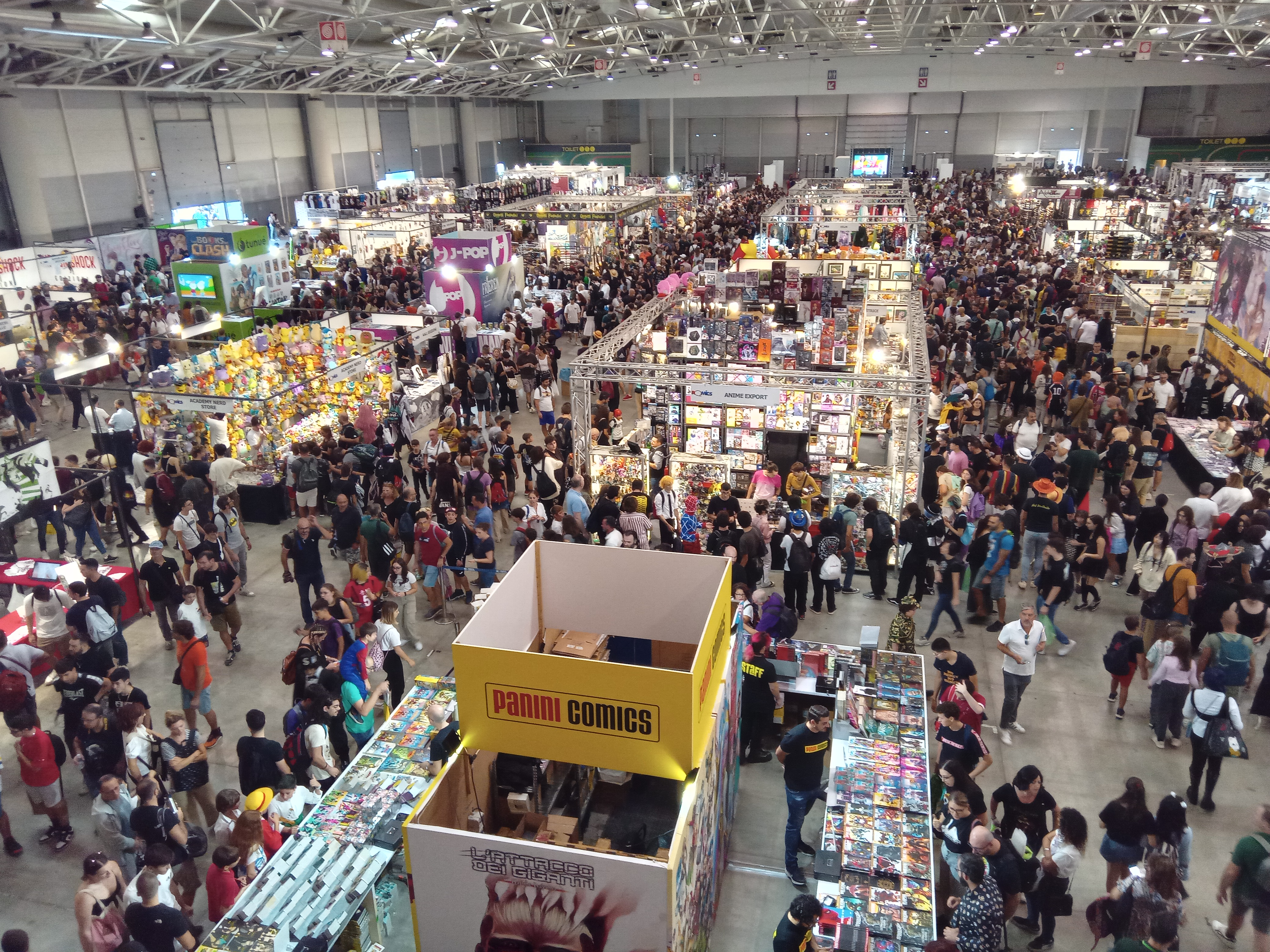
Romics 2023 Autumn edition

- Romics - Comics and Cartoon Festival: the semiannual edition of exhibitions, cartoon film showings of designers and publishing companies.
- Maker Faire - The European edition of this event, organized at the Fiera di Roma (Rome Fair).
- Romaeuropa Festival - Annual appointment for modern art and theatre, music and dance, with artists from all of Europe.
- Roman Summers (from June to September) - Various events from music to theater, literary meetings and cinema. Events that take place in the most characteristic places in Rome that attract the participation of thousands of artists from all over the world.

== The Art ==
One of the most important art-related events in Rome is the Rome Quadriennale, it is an international visual art exhibition event held in the city every 4 years at the Palazzo delle Esposizioni in via Nazionale. It is one of the oldest Italian art exhibitions, since 1931 with the first edition. A major exhibition of Italian art that presents the public with a panorama of the best works of painting, sculpture and black and white (drawing and graphics).

== Religion ==
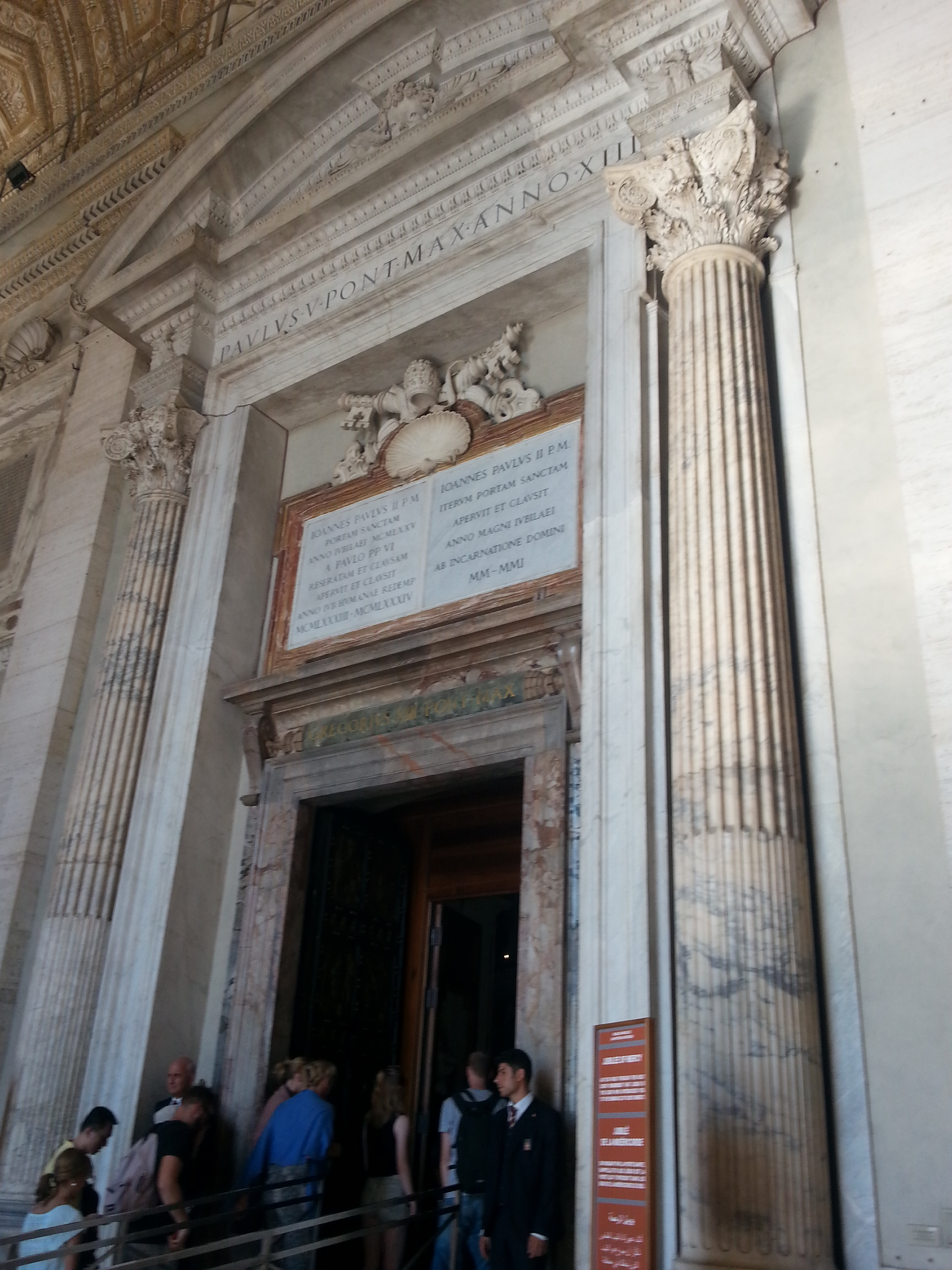
The Holy Door of St. Peter's Basilica, opened in 2016 for the Extraordinary Jubilee of Mercy

Heart of Catholic Christianity, Rome hosts within its urban borders the enclave of the Vatican City. Every 25 years the city is called to organize the Jubilee of the Catholic Church, the year of the remission of sins, reconciliation, conversion and sacramental penance.

The event is one of the largest in the world with an influx of millions of pilgrims, heading towards St. Peter's Basilica on the occasion of the opening of the Holy Door by the Pope.

It is one of the oldest events in the world dating back to 1300, born from the pacifying desire of Pope Boniface VIII.

== Cinema ==
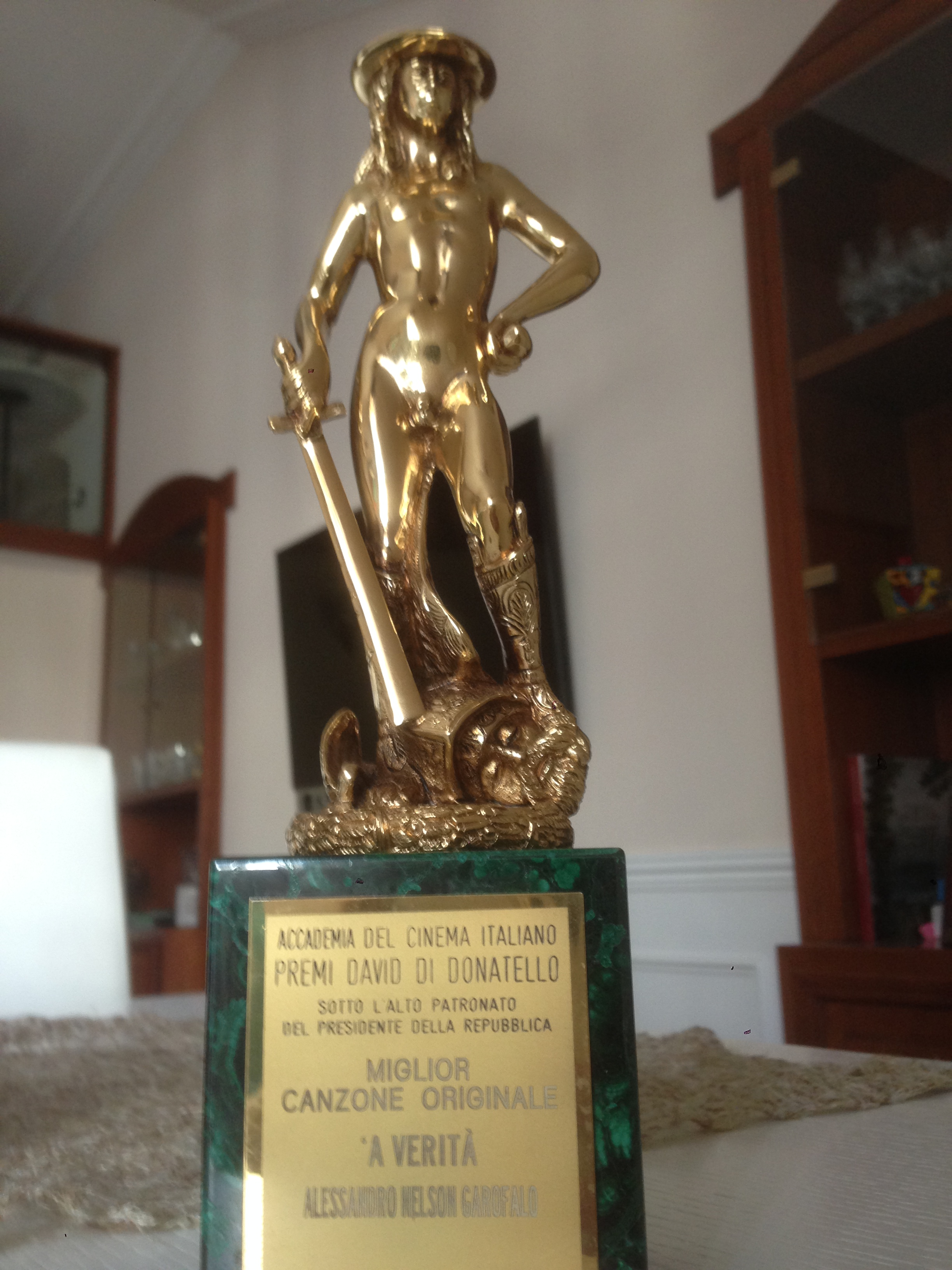
A David di Donatello awarded in 2014

As the capital of Italian cinema with the Cinecittà studios, Rome is one of the most important cities in the world for the film industry.

There are many events related to cinema in Rome, such as the David di Donatello Awards, it is a recognition of Italian cinema, one of the most prestigious awards at a national level. Awarded by the Accademia del Cinema Italiano in various categories. It takes its name from the famous sculpture. During the awards ceremony, the winners are given a miniature reproduction of the statue.

The Rome Independent Film Festival is also of considerable importance, as far as independent cinema is concerned.

And also the Rome Film Festival, an international film festival established in 2006 which is held in autumn at the Parco della Musica in Rome.

== Nightlife ==
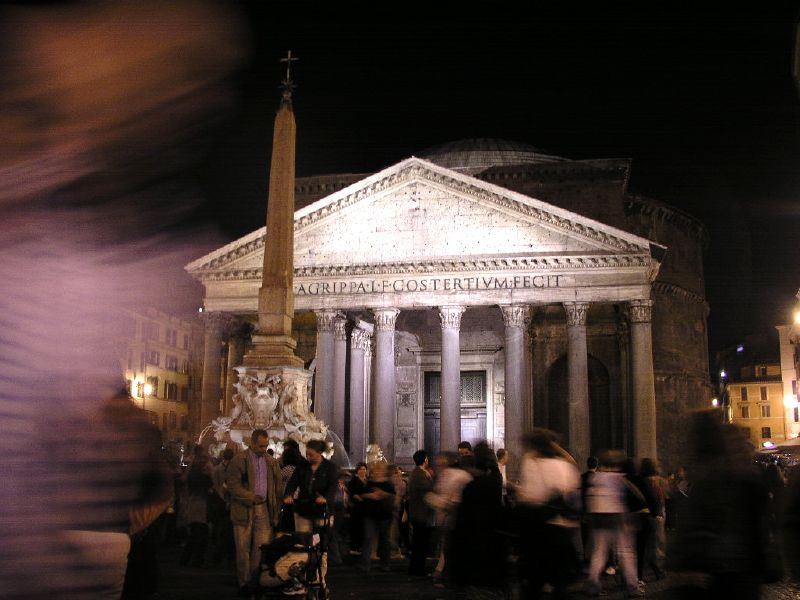
White night by jmax@flickr

Rome boasts a rich, active and vibrant nightlife, which is concentrated mostly in the city center and in the neighborhoods of Trastevere, San Lorenzo, Pigneto, Testaccio and Rione Monti. There are numerous venues, pubs, discos, wine bars and places where you can have an aperitif or gelato, each nightlife neighborhood has its own target and its own peculiarities. Trastevere is well known for being the queen of Roman nightlife, where many Romans and tourists meet. San Lorenzo and Pigneto are meeting points for university nightlife, considered the most "hipster" neighborhoods of the city.

The city is considered the Italian capital of jazz, the Rome Jazz Festival is organized in the city, and since 1876 it has been a meeting point for Italian and international musicians.

=== LGBTQ+ in Rome ===
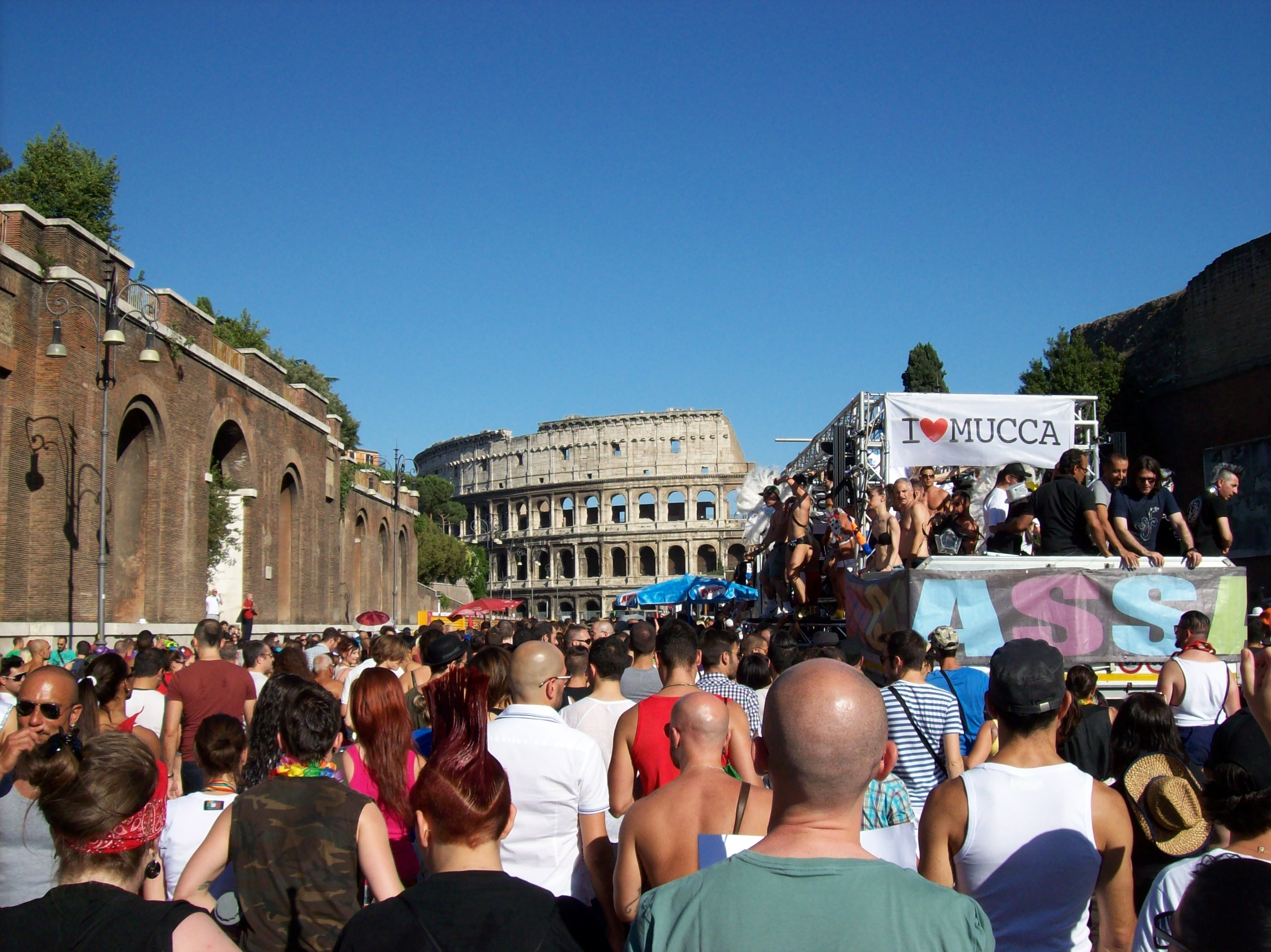
Gay Pride Rome 2012 at the Colosseum

Also enriching the Roman nightlife is the vast amount of gay clubs and discos in the city. The city has a great nightlife, with plenty of queer-friendly bars and clubs. There are also lots of cultural events and activities taking place throughout the year, catering to LGBTQI+ people. The top 3 clubs with regular events are "GIAM", which hosts a weekly event with three dance floors every Saturday, "Muccassassina", one of the most famous gay discos in Italy and "Frutta e Verdura" is a place that includes people from across the LGBT spectrum. And also the Gay Street near the Colosseum, which is a meeting point for the LGBT community of Rome.

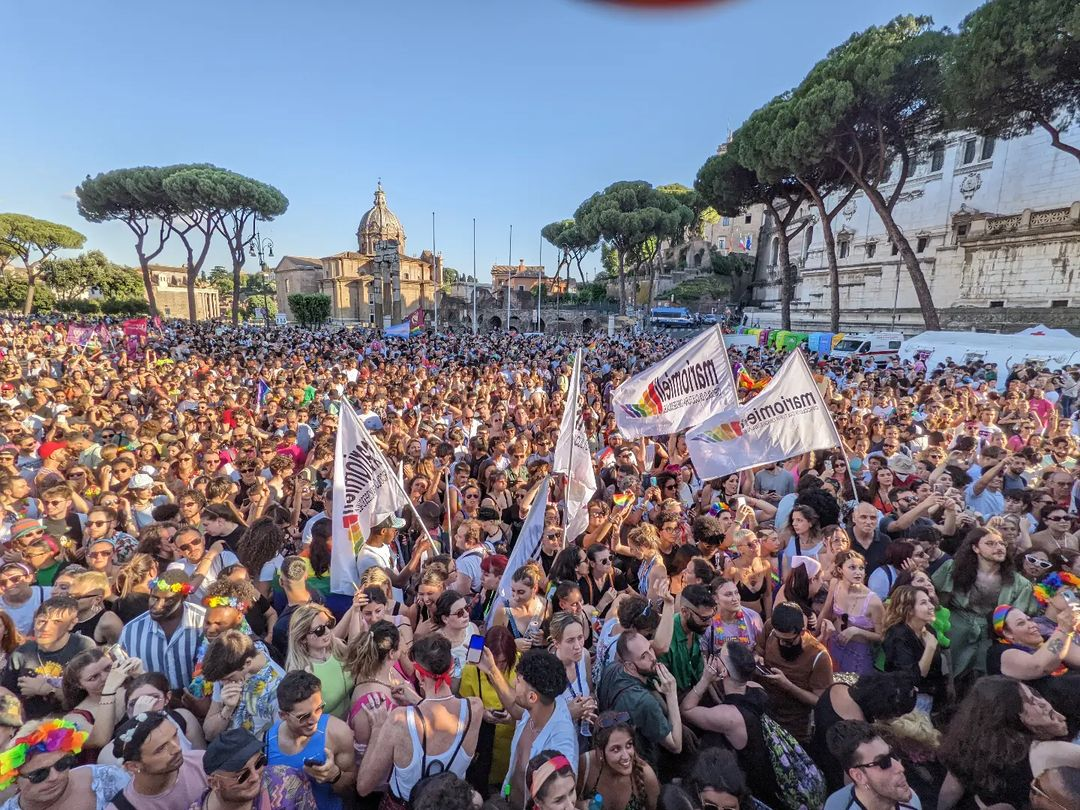
Rome Pride 2023

Rome is often considered one of the most gay-friendly cities in Europe, the Rome Pride organized around the second week of June is one of the largest events in the city with over 1 million participants, the biggest in Italy.

Rome was the first Italian city to organize an official pride event, which was organized in 1994, promoted in particular by activists Imma Battaglia and Vladimir Luxuria. Numerous homosexual associations are based in the city, such as the Circle of Homosexual Culture Mario Mieli, Arcigay, Gay Rome4u.

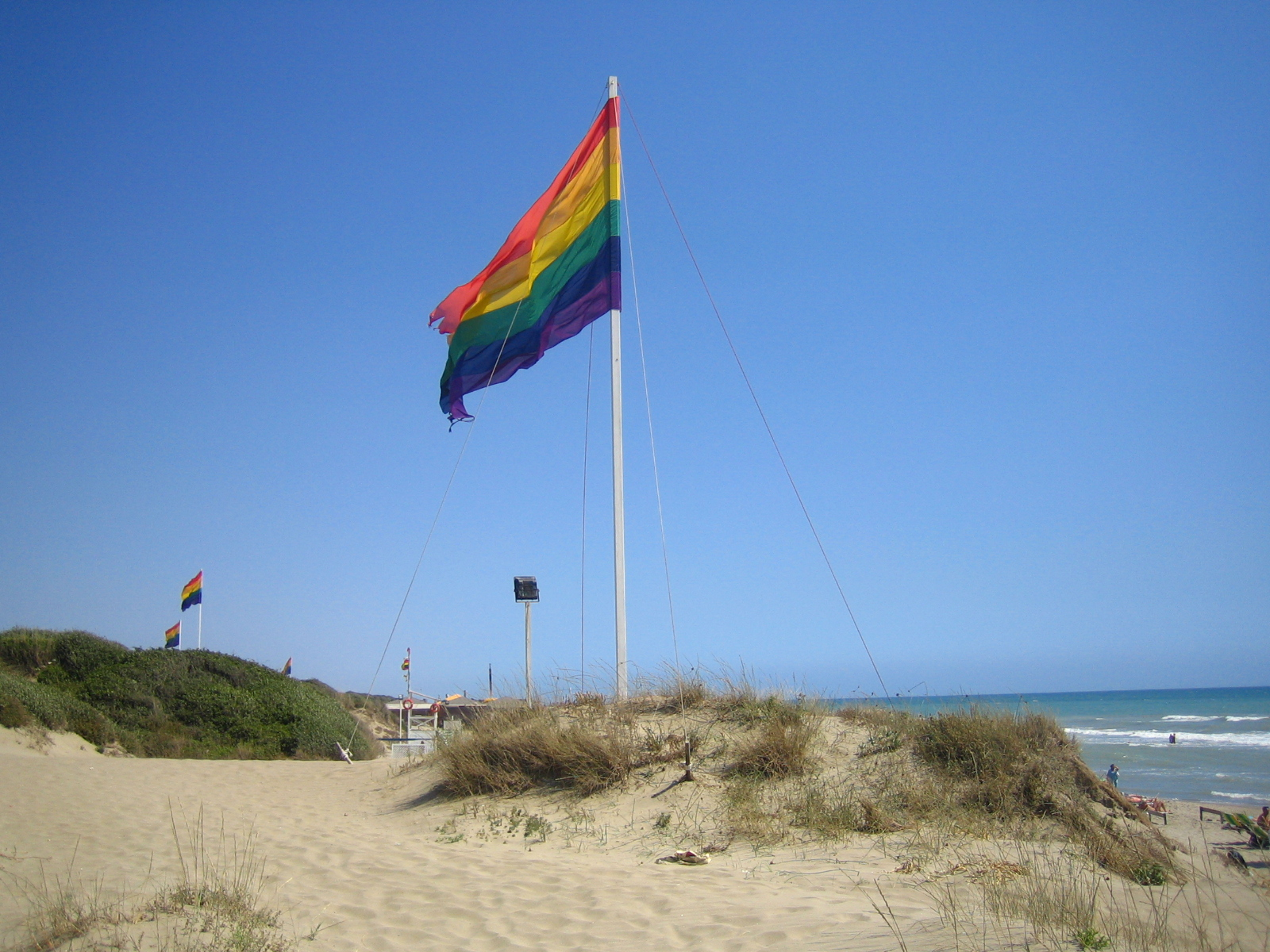
Capocotta gay beach near Ostia
