= List of gay villages =

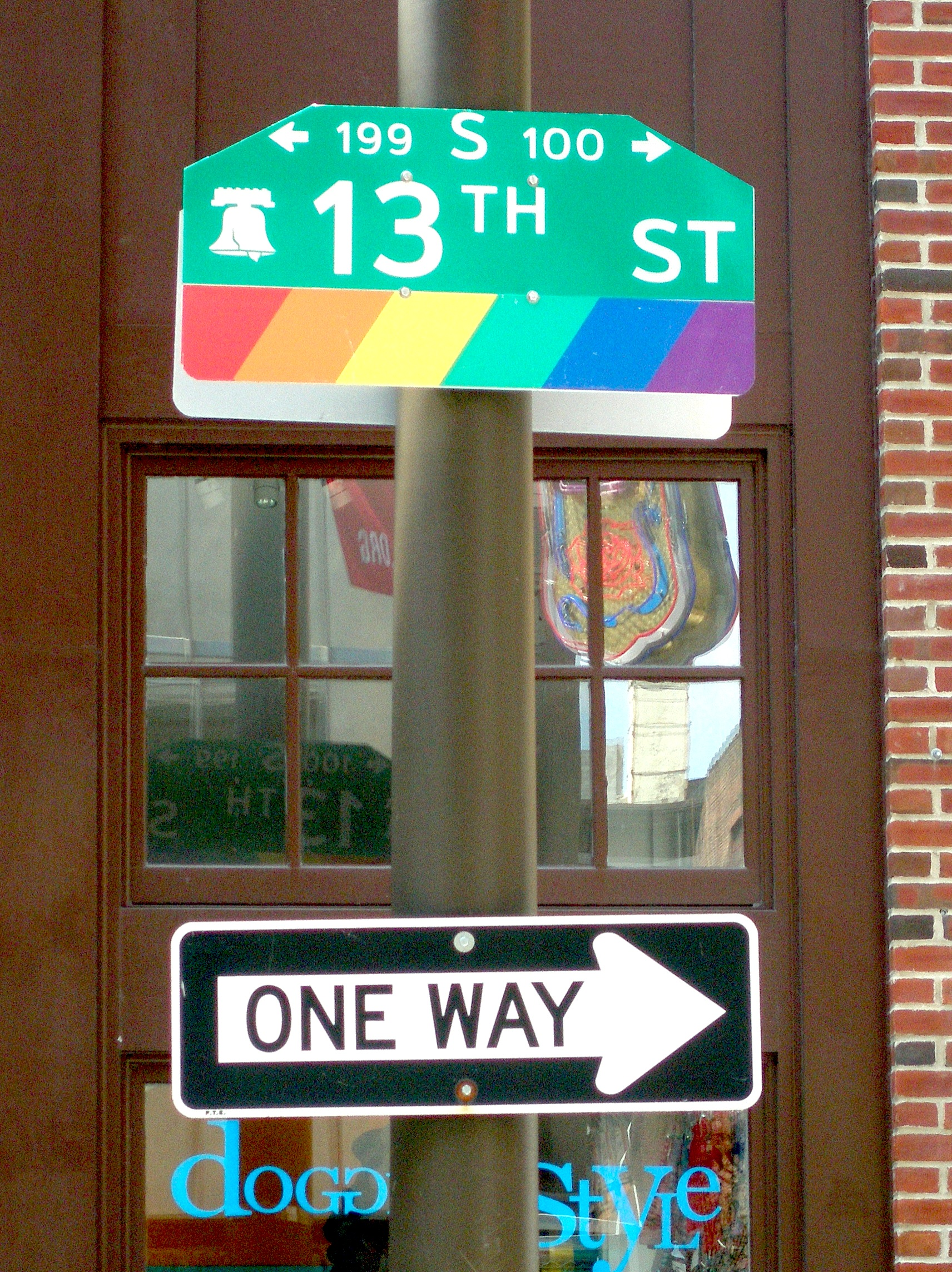
The Gayborhood in Philadelphia

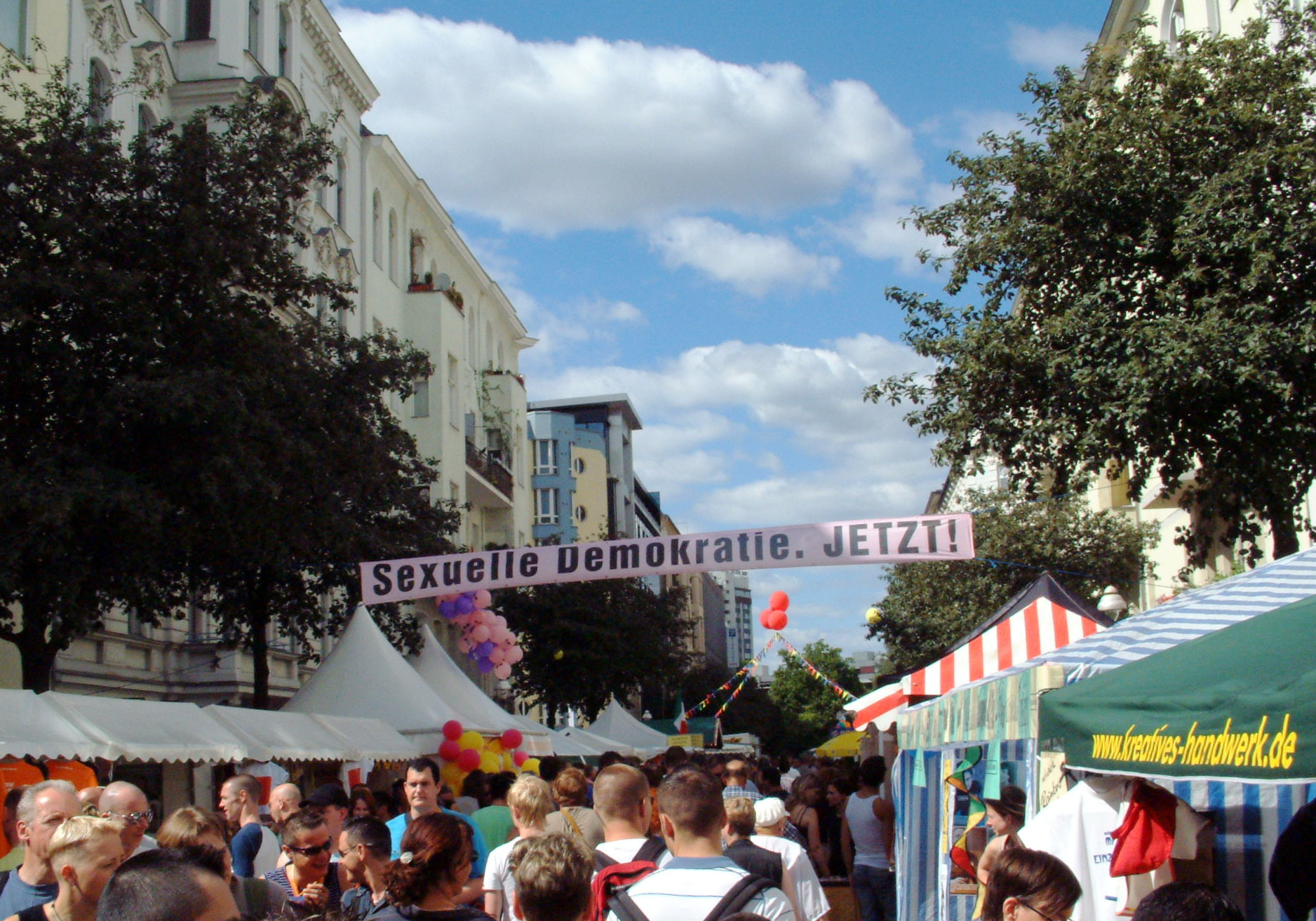
Gay village in Berlin

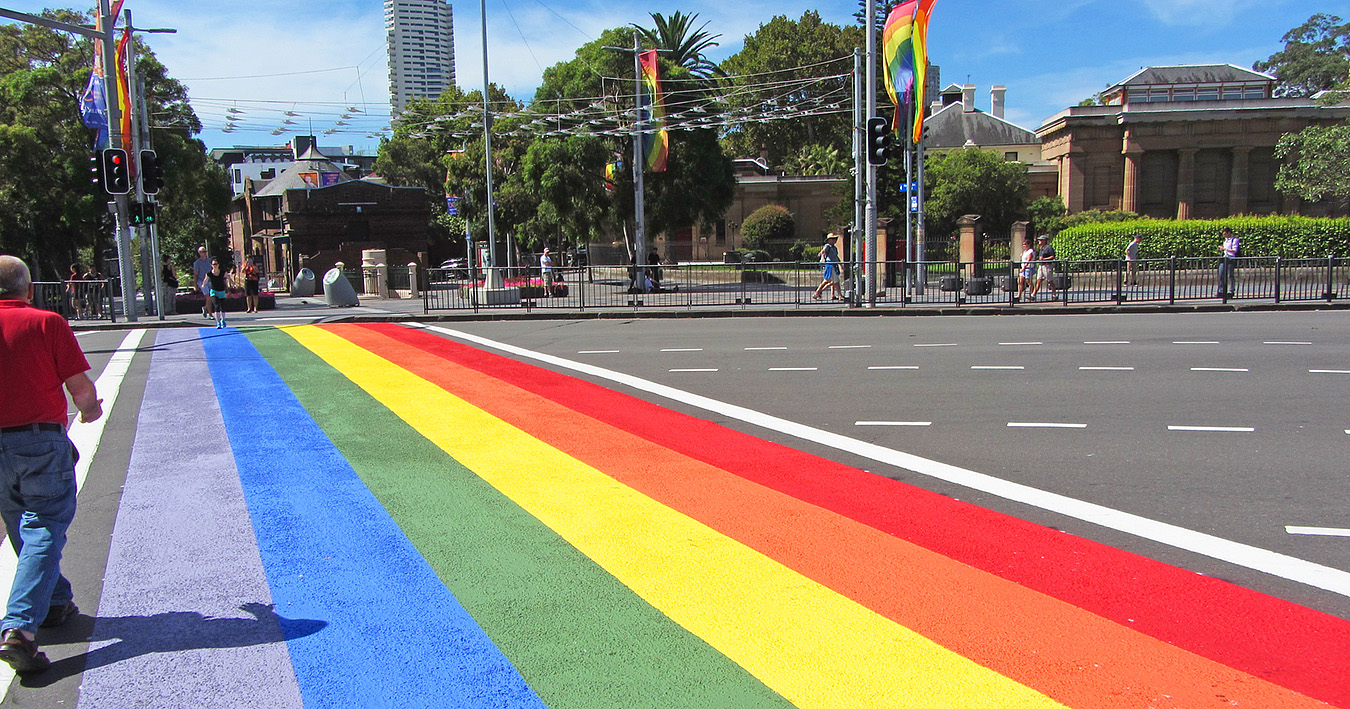
The first temporary Rainbow Crossing in Australia on Oxford Street in Sydney's "gayborhood" of Darlinghurst. It was first installed in February 2013 for the Sydney Gay and Lesbian Mardi Gras and then removed in April 2013.

This is a list of gay villages, areas with generally recognized boundaries that unofficially form a social center for LGBTQ people. They tend to contain a number of gay lodgings, B&Bs, bars, clubs and pubs, restaurants, cafés, and other similar businesses. Some may be gay getaways, such as Provincetown or Guerneville.

== Australia ==
Name of suburb	City	Reference
Brunswick	Melbourne	
Collingwood	Melbourne	
Prahran	Melbourne	
St Kilda	Melbourne	
South Yarra	Melbourne	
Darlinghurst	Sydney	
Daylesford	Daylesford	
New Farm	Brisbane	
Paddington	Sydney	
Potts Point	Sydney	
Surry Hills	Sydney	
Alexandria	Sydney	
Newtown	Sydney	
Marrickville	Sydney	
Dulwich Hill	Sydney	
Maylands	Perth	
East Victoria Park	Perth	

== Argentina ==
Name of village	City	Reference
Barrio Norte	Buenos Aires	
San Telmo	Buenos Aires	

== Belgium ==
Name of village	City	Reference
Brussels-Capital Region
Saint James' Quarter	City of Brussels	

== Brazil ==
Name of village	City	Reference
Farme de Amoedo Street	Rio de Janeiro	
Frei Caneca Street (Shopping center, many bars, saunas, etc.)	São Paulo	

== Canada ==
Name of village	City	Reference
Jasper Avenue	Edmonton	
Le Village gai	Montreal	
The Village/Le village (Bank Street between Nepean and James Streets)	Ottawa	
Church and Wellesley	Toronto	
Queen Street West/Parkdale "Queer West Village"	Toronto	
Davie Village	Vancouver	

== Chile ==
Name of village	City	Reference
Pueblo de Horcón	Valparaíso	
Barrio Lastarria	Santiago	

== Colombia ==
Name of village	City	Reference
Chapinero	Bogotá	

== France ==
Name of village	City	Reference
Le Marais	Paris	

== Greece ==
Name of village	City	Reference
Gazi	Athens	
Mykonos	Mykonos	

== Ireland ==
Name of village	City or County	Reference
Parliament Street	Dublin	

== Japan ==
Name of village	City	Reference
Shinjuku Ni-chōme	Tokyo	
Dōyamachō	Osaka	

== Mexico ==
Name of village	City	Reference
Zona Rosa	Mexico City	
Zona Romántica	Puerto Vallarta	

== New Zealand ==
Name of village	City	Reference
Ponsonby	Auckland	

== Papua New Guinea ==
Name of village	Reference
Hanuabada	

== Portugal ==
Name of village	City	Reference
Chiado	Lisbon	
Príncipe Real	Lisbon	

== South Africa ==
Name of suburb	City	Reference
De Waterkant	Cape Town	

== South Korea ==
Name of suburb	City	Reference
Homo Hill	Seoul	

== Spain ==
Name of village	City	Reference
Chueca	Madrid	
Eixample	Barcelona	
Sitges	Barcelona	
Maspalomas	Gran Canaria	
Torremolinos	Málaga	

== Taiwan ==
Name of Village	City or County	Reference
Ximending	Taipei	
Zhongshan	Taipei	

== Thailand ==
Name of Village	City or County	Reference
Boyztown	Pattaya	

== United Kingdom ==
Name of village	City	Reference
England
Hurst Street	Birmingham	
Kemptown	Brighton	
Old Market	Bristol	
Lower Briggate/The Calls	Leeds	
Liverpool gay quarter	Liverpool	Berkmoes (2001, p. 575)
Chigwell	-	
St Helens	Merseyside	
Old Compton Street/Soho	London	Masters, Fallon & Maric (2008, p. 332)
Vauxhall	London	Masters, Fallon & Maric (2008, p. 336)
Camberwell (aka Vauxhall adjacent)	London	
Earl's Court	London	Masters, Fallon & Maric (2008, p. 174)
Canal Street	Manchester	
Pink Triangle	Newcastle upon Tyne	
Wolstanton	Stoke on Trent	Masters, Fallon & Maric (2008, p. 212)
Northern Ireland
Cathedral Quarter	Belfast	
Scotland
Broughton Street	Edinburgh	
Merchant City	Glasgow	
Wales
Charles Street and Churchill Way	Cardiff	

== United States ==
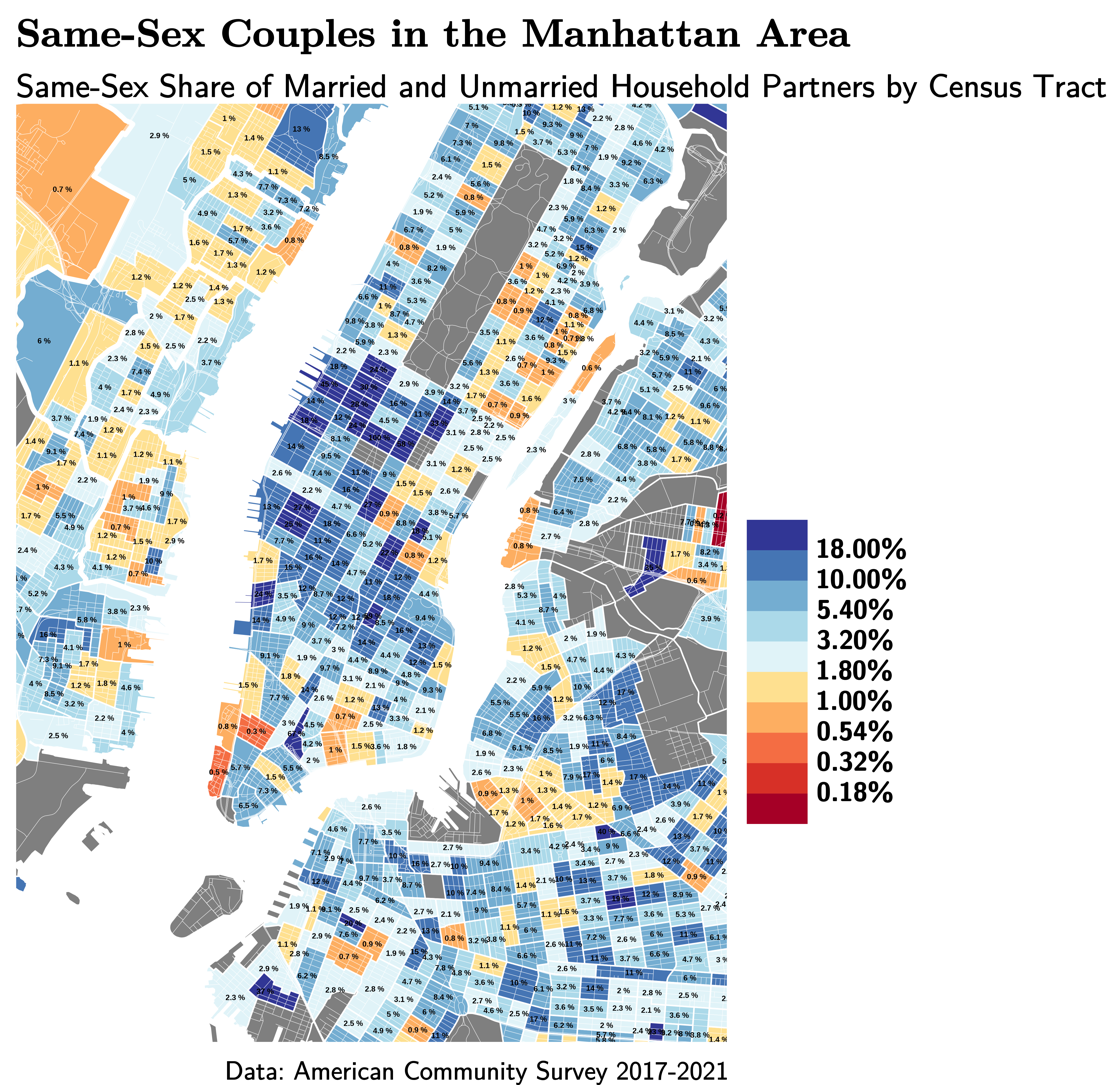
Map of Same-Sex Couples in Manhattan

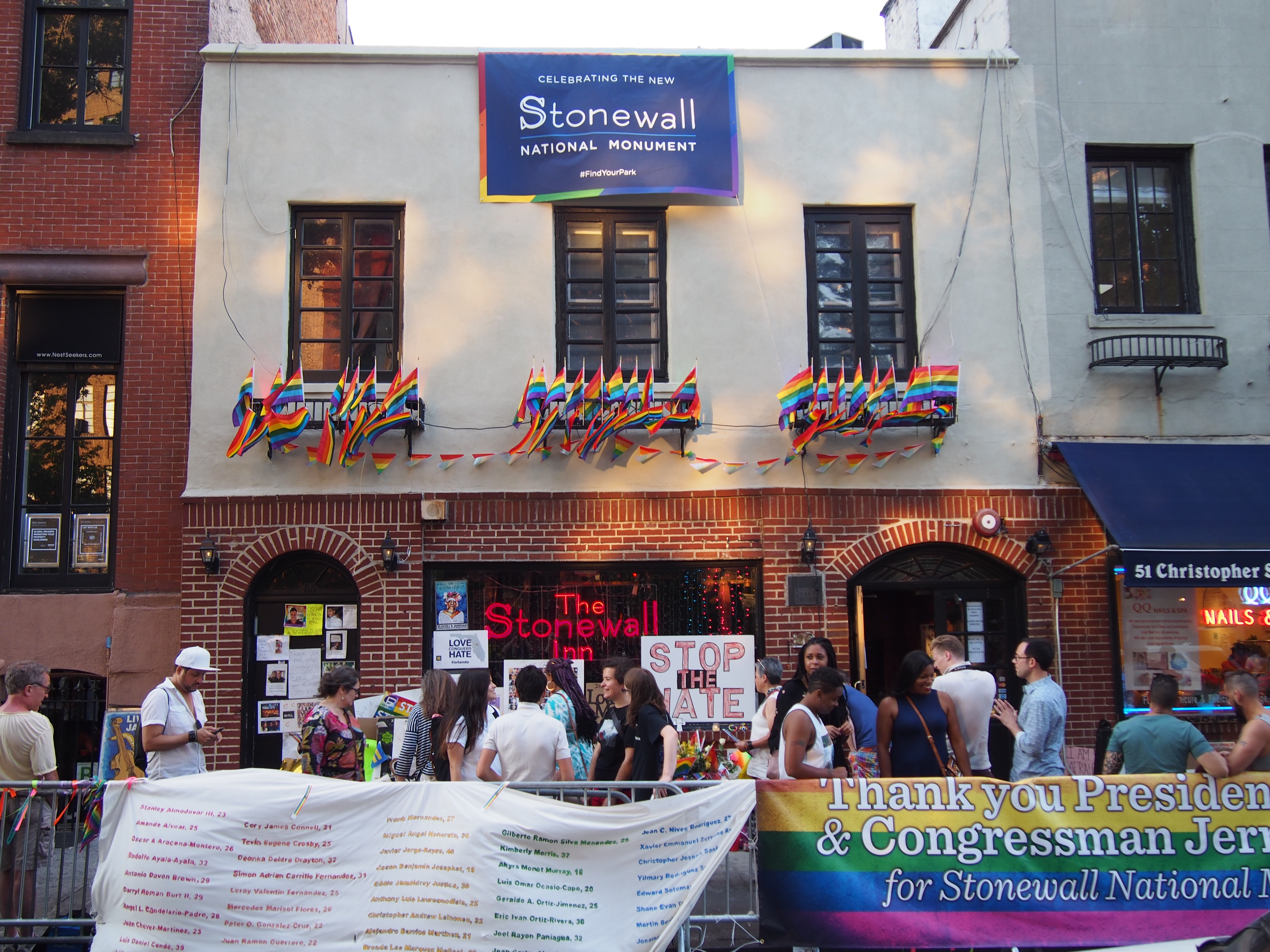
The Stonewall Inn is in the gay village of Greenwich Village, Manhattan.

Name of village	City or County	Reference
California
Tower District	Fresno	
Guerneville	Sonoma County	
The Broadway Corridor	Long Beach	
Silver Lake	Los Angeles	
Castro District	San Francisco	
Laguna Beach	Orange County	
West Hollywood	Los Angeles County	
Palm Springs	Riverside County	
Hillcrest	San Diego	
Qmunity District	San Jose	
Colorado
Capitol Hill	Denver	
River North	Denver	
Delaware
Rehoboth Beach	Sussex County	
District of Columbia
Dupont Circle	Washington, D.C.	
Logan Circle	Washington, D.C.	
Columbia Heights	Washington, D.C.	
Florida
Riverside and Avondale	Jacksonville	
Key West	Monroe County	
Lake Worth	Palm Beach County	
Miami Beach	Miami Beach	
Audubon Park	Orlando	
Coytown	Orlando	
Wilton Manors	Broward County	
Ybor City	Tampa	
Grand Central	St. Petersburg	
Georgia
Midtown Central	Atlanta	
Cheshire Bridge Road	Atlanta	
Ansley Park	Atlanta	
Piedmont Heights	Atlanta	
Oakhurst	Decatur	
Avondale Street	Avondale Estates	
Idaho
North End	Boise	
Illinois
Andersonville	Chicago	
Edgewater (esp. Hollywood Beach, a.k.a. Osterman Beach)	Chicago	
Uptown	Chicago	
Lake View East (esp. North Halsted Street, a.k.a. Boystown)	Chicago	
Indiana
Beverly Shores	Beverly Shores	
Downtown (esp. Mass Ave Cultural Arts District and St. Joseph)	Indianapolis	
Herron–Morton Place	Indianapolis	
Kentucky
The Highlands	Louisville	
Louisiana
Faubourg Marigny	New Orleans	
French Quarter	New Orleans	
P-Town, also called Pigeon Town / Pension Town	New Orleans	
Maine
Ogunquit	York County	
Maryland
Mount Vernon	Baltimore	
Massachusetts
Jamaica Plain	Boston	
South End	Boston	
Provincetown	Barnstable County	
Michigan
Douglas	Douglas	
Saugatuck	Saugatuck	
Ferndale	Detroit	
Kerrytown	Ann Arbor	
Minnesota
Downtown Duluth	Duluth	
Loring Park	Minneapolis	
Nordeast Arts District	Minneapolis	
North Loop	Minneapolis	
Powderhorn Park	Minneapolis	
Uptown	Minneapolis	
Pine City	Pine County	
Missouri
Westport	Kansas City	
The Grove	St. Louis	
Nebraska
Old Market	Omaha	
Nevada
Fruit Loop	Las Vegas	
New Hampshire
Somersworth	Strafford County	
New Jersey
Asbury Park	Monmouth County	
Atlantic City	Atlantic County	
Cape May	Cape May County	
Collingswood	Camden County	
Ewing	Mercer County	
Jersey City	Hudson County	
Lambertville	Hunterdon County	
Maplewood	Essex County	
Mill Hill (Trenton)	Mercer County	
Ocean Grove	Monmouth County	
Plainfield	Union County	
South Orange	Essex County	
New York
Chelsea	New York City (Manhattan)	
Christopher Street, West Village/Greenwich Village	New York City (Manhattan)	
Hell's Kitchen	New York City (Manhattan)	
Inwood	New York City (Manhattan)	
Washington Heights	New York City (Manhattan)	
Park Slope	New York City (Brooklyn)	
Jackson Heights	New York City (Queens)	
Cherry Grove	Suffolk County	
Fire Island Pines	Suffolk County	
The Hamptons	Suffolk County	
Allentown	Buffalo	
Park Avenue (Rochester)	Monroe County	
Hawley-Green Historic District	Syracuse	
Lark Street	Albany	
North Carolina
NoDa Arts District	Charlotte	
Plaza-Midwood	Charlotte	
South End	Charlotte	
Village Hearth	Durham	
Five Points	Raleigh	
Warehouse	Raleigh	
Ohio
Highland Square	Akron	
Northside	Cincinnati	
Detroit-Shoreway	Cleveland	
Edgewater	Cleveland	
Lakewood	Suburb of Cleveland	
Clintonville	Columbus	
The Short North	Columbus	
German Village	Columbus	
Oklahoma
N.W. 39th Street	Oklahoma City	
Oregon
Old Town	Portland	
Burnside Triangle	Portland	
Pennsylvania
Midtown	Harrisburg	
East Passyunk Crossing	Philadelphia	
Washington Square West (a.k.a. The Gayborhood)	Philadelphia	
West Mount Airy	Philadelphia	
New Hope	Bucks County	
Shadyside	Pittsburgh	
Mexican War Streets	Pittsburgh	
United States Territory of Puerto Rico
Condado	San Juan	
Texas
Main Street	San Antonio	
Midtown	San Antonio	
Galveston	Galveston County	
Oak Lawn	Dallas	
Montrose	Houston	
Utah
Marmalade District	Salt Lake City	
Vermont
Burlington	Burlington	
Washington (state)
Capitol Hill, Seattle	Seattle	

== See also ==
- Gay Street

== Sources ==
- Berkmoes, Ryan Ver (2001), Britain (4 ed.), Lonely Planet, ISBN 978-1-86450-147-6
- Masters, Tom; Fallon, Steve; Maric, Vesna (2008), London: city guide (6 ed.), Lonely Planet, ISBN 978-1-74104-712-7
