= Gay Street =

Gay Street may refer to:

== Streets ==
- Gay Street, Bath, Somerset, England
- Gay Street (Baltimore street), Maryland, USA
- Gay Street, High and Gay Streets Historic District, Columbus, Ohio, USA
- Gay Street (Knoxville), Tennessee, USA
- Gay Street (Manhattan), New York City, USA

== Other uses ==
- Gay Street, West Sussex, England, UK; a hamlet
- Gay Street (neighborhood), Baltimore, Maryland, USA; a neighborhood
- Gay Street (Rome), Italy; a neighborhood

== See also ==
- Gay Street Historic District, Baltimore
- Gay Village, an LGBTQI+ neighborhood
- Gay (disambiguation)
