= Botanical Heights, St. Louis =

Neighborhood of St. Louis in Missouri, US

Coordinates: 38.6224°N 90.2497°W

Botanical Heights
- Neighborhood of St. Louis
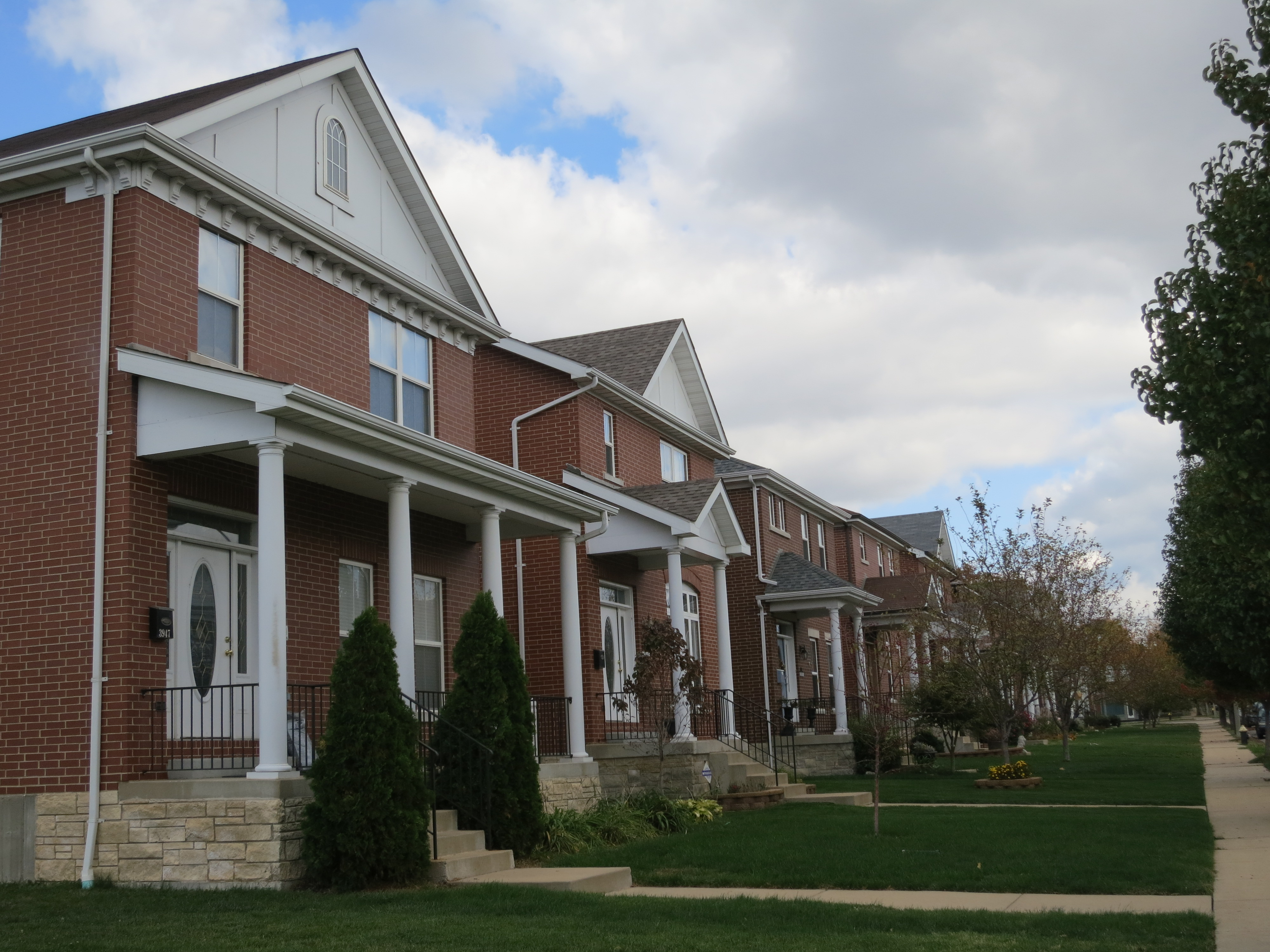
- Houses in Botanical Heights, October 2012

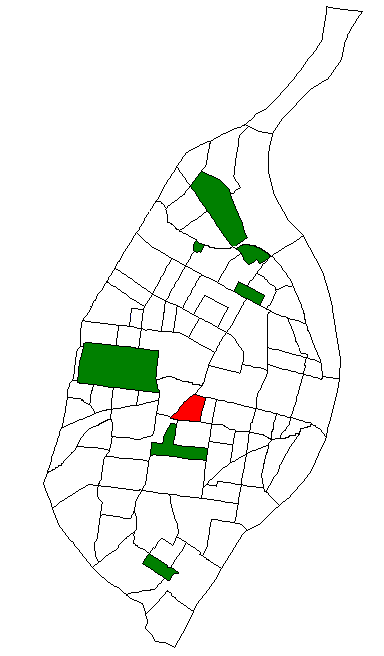
- Location (red) of Botanical Heights within St. Louis
- Country: United States
- State: Missouri
- City: St. Louis
- Ward: 7

Government
  - Alderperson: Alisha Sonnier

Area
  - Total: 0.41 sq mi (1.1 km^{2})

Population (2020)
  - Total: 1,196
  - Density: 2,900/sq mi (1,100/km^{2})
- ZIP code(s): Part of 63110
- Area code(s): 314
- Website: stlouis-mo.gov

Botanical Heights is a neighborhood of St. Louis, Missouri. Its former name was McRee Town. The Botanical Heights neighborhood is defined by Chouteau Avenue on the North, Interstate 44 on the South, 39th Street on the East and Vandeventer Avenue on the West. This near Southside neighborhood is located just north of the Shaw neighborhood.

== Demographics ==
Historical population
| Year | Pop. | ±% |
|---|---|---|
| 1990 | 3,152 | — |
| 2000 | 1,818 | −42.3% |
| 2010 | 1,037 | −43.0% |
| 2020 | 1,196 | +15.3% |

In 2020 Botanical Heights' population was 50.0% Black, 37.2% White, 0.3% Native American, 3.3% Asian, 7.3% Two or More Races, and 1.6% Some Other Race. 5.0% of the neighborhood's population was of Hispanic or Latino origin, 20.3% have a High school education.

| Racial composition | 2000 | 2010 | 2020 |
|---|---|---|---|
| White | 6.8% | 20.3% | 37.2% |
| Black or African American | 89.4% | 74.4% | 50.0% |
| Hispanic or Latino (of any race) | 2.4% | 2.1% | 5.0% |
| Asian | 0% | 1.7% | 3.3% |

== See also ==
- Grand Boulevard, nearby major road and commercial area to the east
- The Grove, an up-and-coming business and nightlife district to the west
- Missouri Botanical Garden
- Midtown St. Louis, the nearby area
