= Forest Park Southeast, St. Louis =

Neighborhood of St. Louis in Missouri, US

Coordinates: 38.6259°N 90.2585°W

Forest Park Southeast
- Neighborhood of St. Louis
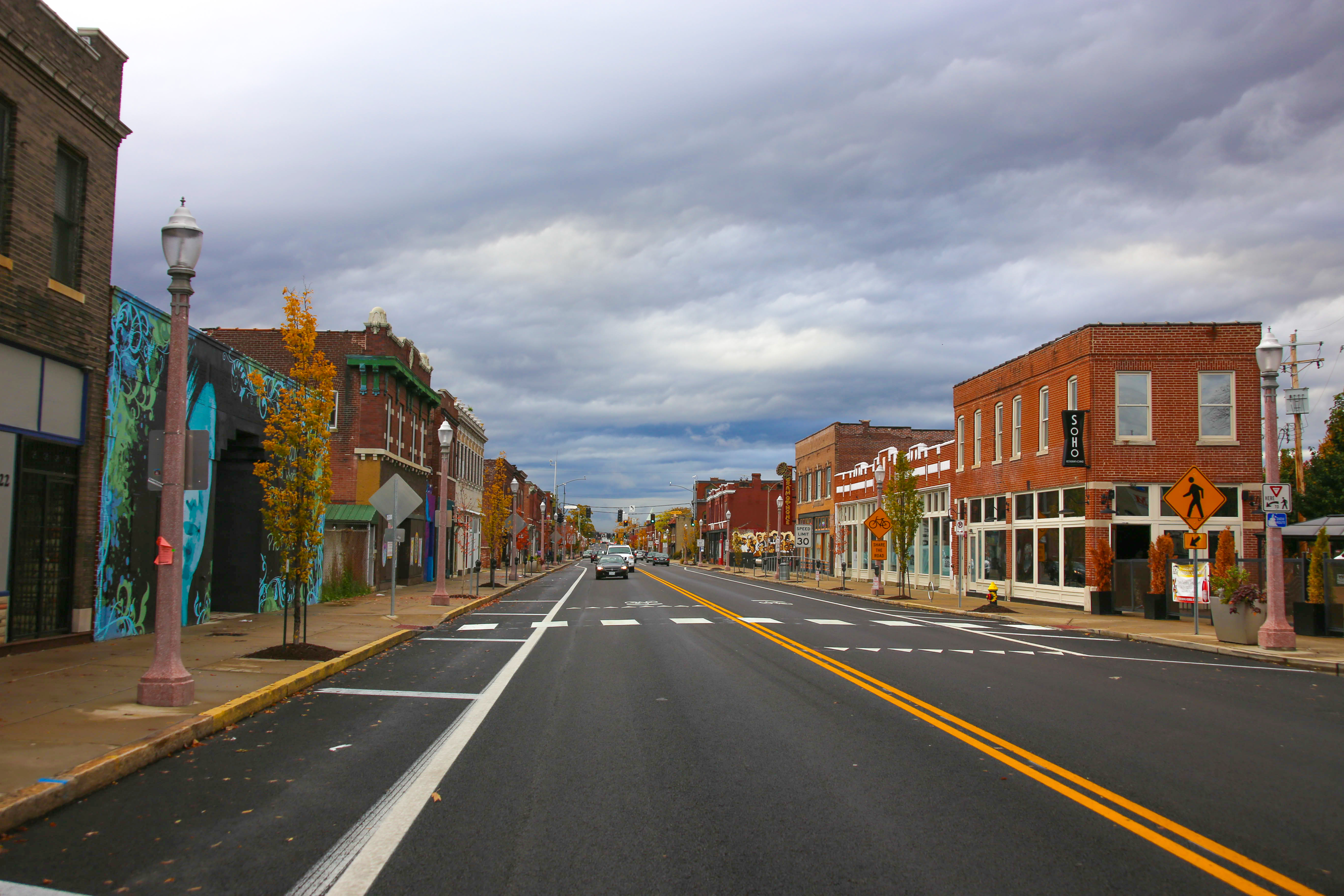
- The Grove, Forest Park Southeast, October 2013

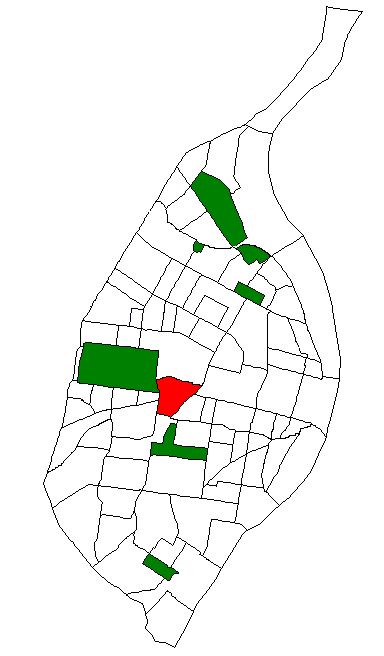
- Location (red) of Forest Park Southeast within St. Louis
- Country: United States
- State: Missouri
- City: St. Louis
- Ward: 9

Government
  - Aldermen: Michael Browning

Area
  - Total: 0.64 sq mi (1.7 km^{2})

Population (2020)
  - Total: 3,458
  - Density: 5,400/sq mi (2,100/km^{2})
- ZIP code(s): Part of 63110
- Area code(s): 314
- Website: stlouis-mo.gov

Forest Park Southeast (FPSE) is a neighborhood of St. Louis, Missouri. It is bordered by Interstate 64 (U.S. Route 40) to the north, Vandeventer Avenue to the east, Interstate 44 to the south, and Kingshighway Boulevard and Forest Park to the west. Adjoining neighborhoods include Kings Oak and The Hill to the west, Southwest Garden to the south, Botanical Heights to the southeast, Midtown to the east, and the Central West End to the north.

The commercial district along Manchester Avenue, which bisects the neighborhood, is branded as The Grove.

== History ==
In the late 18th century, prior to the founding of St. Louis, present-day Forest Park Southeast was part of a region of communal French farms known as Prairie des Noyers ("Meadows of the Walnut Trees"). Following the Louisiana Purchase, the area's complex land titles were gradually assigned to private owners, who then sold to speculators.

By the 1820s, the area was part of a large tract owned by Samuel McRee (namesake of McRee Town, today Botanical Heights). A portion of this tract containing modern-day Forest Park Southeast was sold to Henry Shaw in the 1840s, and the Missouri Pacific Railroad purchased its right-of-way at the southern edge of the neighborhood in 1850. Despite the arrival of the railroad, the area remained undeveloped through the American Civil War.

The area was annexed by the city of St. Louis in 1876, when the city limits shifted westward from Grand Boulevard to Skinker Boulevard. In the following decade, multiple streetcar lines were extended westward into the neighborhood, spurring the development of Forest Park Southeast as a streetcar suburb. Gibson Heights, located in the northwestern quadrant of modern-day Forest Park Southeast, became the area's first residential development in 1880.

Between 1880 and 1900, the neighborhood grew rapidly, and a vibrant commercial district developed along Manchester Avenue. While its proximity to industry and railroads made it less desirable than the affluent Central West End to the north, Forest Park Southeast was ideally situated to house a diverse working-class population of merchants, tradesmen, and laborers.

Forest Park Southeast was largely built out by 1910, and it experienced its final wave of construction in the mid-1920s as St. Louis's population continued to disperse to the west. Beginning in the 1960s, deindustrialization and suburbanization resulted in severe disinvestment in and depopulation of the neighborhood. By the 1990s, the neighborhood had developed a significant crime problem and a third of its population was under the federal poverty line.

Gentrification of Forest Park Southeast began in the 1990s with the arrival of LGBT-oriented bars and clubs along Manchester Avenue, establishing the neighborhood as a gay village. These nightlife establishments revitalized a largely abandoned retail district, which diversified into daytime restaurants and stores during the 2000s. By the end of that decade, local business owners began branding the Manchester Avenue retail district as "The Grove", a reference to the historic Adams Grove residential development in the southern portion of the neighborhood. The branding of the district was formalized in 2009 with the creation of The Grove Community Improvement District (CID), which levies a special sales tax to fund public improvements within its boundaries.

The proximity of the neighborhood to the Washington University Medical Center and Cortex Innovation Community has accelerated gentrification. The Washington University Medical Center Redevelopment Corporation (WUMCRC) has invested heavily in the neighborhood since the 1990s with the purchase and redevelopment of over 500 vacant or abandoned properties. WUMCRC has partnered with local developers to build a mix of market-rate and affordable single-family housing on these properties, which are largely concentrated in the southern half of the neighborhood.

In 2017, a form-based zoning code was created in order to regulate the urban design of new development in the neighborhood.

== Demographics ==
Historical population
Year	Pop.	±%
1990	4,087	—
2000	3,704	−9.4%
2010	2,918	−21.2%
2020	3,458	+18.5%

In 2020 the neighborhood's population was 36.1% Black, 46.2% White, 0.2% Native American, 7.0% Asian, 0.1% Pacific Islander, 7.3% Two or More Races, and 3.2% Some Other Race. 4.7% of the population was of Hispanic or Latino origin.

Racial composition	2000	2010	2020
White	18.4%	30.1%	46.2%
Black or African American	77.0%	64.3%	36.1%
Hispanic or Latino (of any race)	0.9%	2.1%	4.7%
Asian	0.8%	2.4%	7.0%

== See also ==
- Botanical Heights, St. Louis, neighborhood to the east
- Central West End, St. Louis, neighborhood to the north
- Midtown St. Louis, the nearby area

== Sources ==
- National Register of Historic Places - Nomination Forms
  - "Forest Park Southeast Historic District" (PDF). Missouri Department of Natural Resources.
  - "Forest Park Southeast Historic District - Boundary Increase #1 (map)" (PDF). Missouri Department of Natural Resources.
  - "Forest Park Southeast Historic District - Boundary Increase #2 (map)" (PDF). Missouri Department of Natural Resources.
