= The Gay News-Telegraph =

LGBT newspaper

- First issue of newspaper
- Type: Broadsheet
- Founder: Jim Thomas
- Publisher: Piasa Publishing
- Editor: Jim Thomas
- Launched: October 1981; 44 years ago
- Ceased publication: January 2000; 26 years ago
- Relaunched: June 2000; (as Vital Voice)
- City: St. Louis, Missouri
- Country: US
- ISSN: 1062-5585
- OCLC number: 31871206

The Gay News-Telegraph was an American LGBT newspaper that ran from 1981 to 2000. It was published by Piasa Publishing, in St. Louis, Missouri. By 1992, the name had changed to The Lesbian and Gay News-Telegraph. In 1994, The New York Times reported their circulation at 14,000 copies, and in 1995, the St. Louis Post-Dispatch said it had been reaching "40,000 readers". It was distributed in six states. Their last issue was published on January 14, 2000.

It was re-launched in June 2000 as the Vital Voice, published by Pam Schneider, with Jim Thomas staying on as editor. In 2009 it was sold to Darin Slyman of OMNI Media, who changed its format into a high gloss magazine. In 2013, he expanded its circulation into Kansas City, Missouri. He shut down the magazine in January 2020, when he took a job as marketing director for Edge Media.

== History and background ==
Thomas founded the Telegraph in 1981, with the first issue coming out in October. Thomas recalled that when they first started publishing the paper, "a lot of people said it was beyond what St. Louis was ready for". Thomas was also a founder of the 'St. Louis Gay and Lesbian Pride Celebration', now known as St. Louis PrideFest. The paper reported on national and local political issues concerning the LGBT community, had reviews of cultural interests in St. Louis, editorial opinion pieces, local news coverage, and listed events that were tailored towards the LGBT population. The newspaper was a member of the Gay and Lesbian Press Association, which advocated for the interests of LGBT journalists and LGBT publications. They also accepted advertisements to help defray the costs of publication. Kris Kleindienst, co-owner of Left Bank Books wrote a column for over 20 years in the newspaper.

In 1982, after four homosexual related murders in the St. Louis area had local LGBT folks frightened for their safety, Thomas and reporter Tim Cusick offered their assistance to law-enforcement in getting LGBT people with information to come forward, and cooperate with St. Louis detectives. Cusick reported that some gays who might have information about the murders refused to talk to law-enforcement for "fear of derision". In 1983, after the Telegraph ran an article about the National Association of Business Councils successfully negotiating a policy change with the Miller Brewing Company, for no discrimination based on sexual orientation, the white supremacist newspaper The Thunderbolt, called for a boycott of the brewery.

In 1987 and 1988, they included a separate section (B) with the newspaper titled: Huzza: The Gay News-Telegraph Magazine. Additionally in 1988, the Telegraph covered Sasha Alysons "Clip Your Visa" campaign, which was a protest of the credit company's support of the "anti-gay US Olympic Committee". Alyson was upset over Visa's sponsorship of the Olympics. Alyson elaborated that he was enraged over the "viciously homophobic" way the committee had treated Tom Waddell, who had famously lost a lawsuit in 1982, when the International Olympic Committee sued him over his use of the word "Olympic", for his idea of creating a Gay Olympics competition. The campaign called for Visa cardholders to cut their credit card in half, sending one half back to the company and the other half to Alyson Publications. The "clippings" sent to Alyson were made into a banner to memorialize Waddell, who had died in 1987. (Note: Photograph of Waddell next to the original Gay Olympic Games poster, showing the word Olympic covered due to the lawsuit. In his hand, he is holding a list of other organizations who were permitted to use the word Olympic in their "games".)

In September 1990, they opened a regional office in Kansas City, Missouri. Jon Barnett, who was a founding member of the Kansas City ACT UP, joined the newspaper as an associate editor in 1991. Barnett told The Kansas City Star, they had a circulation of 4,800 in KC, with a total regional circulation of around 16,000. The newspaper was distributed for free mainly in LGBT bars and LGBT owned businesses. Barnett said their main focus was to cover news that the mainstream media overlooked, like instances of LGBT discrimination and gay-bashing. In 1991, Barnett became the first openly gay resident of Kansas City to run for public office for the KC council. After his loss in the primary, he continued writing for the newspaper, and Mayor Emanuel Cleaver installed him as a member of the Commission on Gay and Lesbian Concerns of KC. In 1994, the Gay and Lesbian Alliance Against Defamation presented Barnett with a leadership award for his work at The Lesbian and Gay News Telegraph.

A major scoop for the newspaper occurred in 1992, when St. Louis passed one of the most substantial LGBT rights ordinances in the country. The Telegraph was the first St. Louis newspaper to report it, as the story had not been reported by any other media outlet since the ordinance had been passed.

== Demise ==
The newspaper ceased publication on January 14, 2000. Thomas suggested there were a multitude of reasons for the paper's demise. One of the reasons was because they had operating deficits because of a substantial decrease in advertising revenue. But the main reason, according to Thomas, was when Mulryan Nash, an ad company based in New York City, went out of business. The company specialized in LGBT media, and they went "belly-up" in December 1999, which left the newspaper "holding the bag on thousands of dollars," Thomas claimed. "It was more than we could bear."

== Vital Voice ==
June 19, 2014 issue of Vital Voice

In February 2000, Pam Schneider, a St. Louis businesswoman, got in touch with Thomas about starting up a new LGBT newspaper. She had experience in the publishing business, from producing a local LGBT business directory called St. Louis Pride Pages. She told Thomas she would finance the new operation if he came aboard to be the "brain of the publishing of the newspaper." In March, Thomas relented and signed on as the editor for a year of the newly minted newspaper, titled the Vital Voice. The first issue came out in time for Pride Month in June 2000. The newspaper had the same format as the Telegraph, a broadsheet, and was supplied to 110 locations in the St. Louis area, and was still free, like the Telegraph had been. However, some newsstands would only carry the paper if it was purchased at a price of 75 cents.

In 2007, Schneider managed to get the publication into St. Louis Lambert International Airport, a big accomplishment, she claimed. By 2009, the newspaper with now a circulation of 30,000 free copies, had become a financial strain on Scheider, and as she recalls, "my well had run dry", so she suspended publication of the paper in September 2009. In 2011, Schneider reflected on her time as a "media mogul", and said that the publishing business in St. Louis at that time, was male dominated, and rumors got back to her that "people were calling it the 'Vagina Voice.'"

In 2009, Darin Slyman, owner of OMNI media, bought the Voice from Schneider, and turned it into a high-gloss LGBT magazine. In 2013, he increased the circulation base into Kansas City, and in 2017, the magazine was only available online. Slyman closed the magazine down in January 2020, when he accepted a job from Edge Media.

== See also ==
- List of LGBT periodicals
- List of LGBT rights activists
- The Phoenix: Midwest Homophile Voice
