= Qmunity District =

- Neighborhood of San Jose
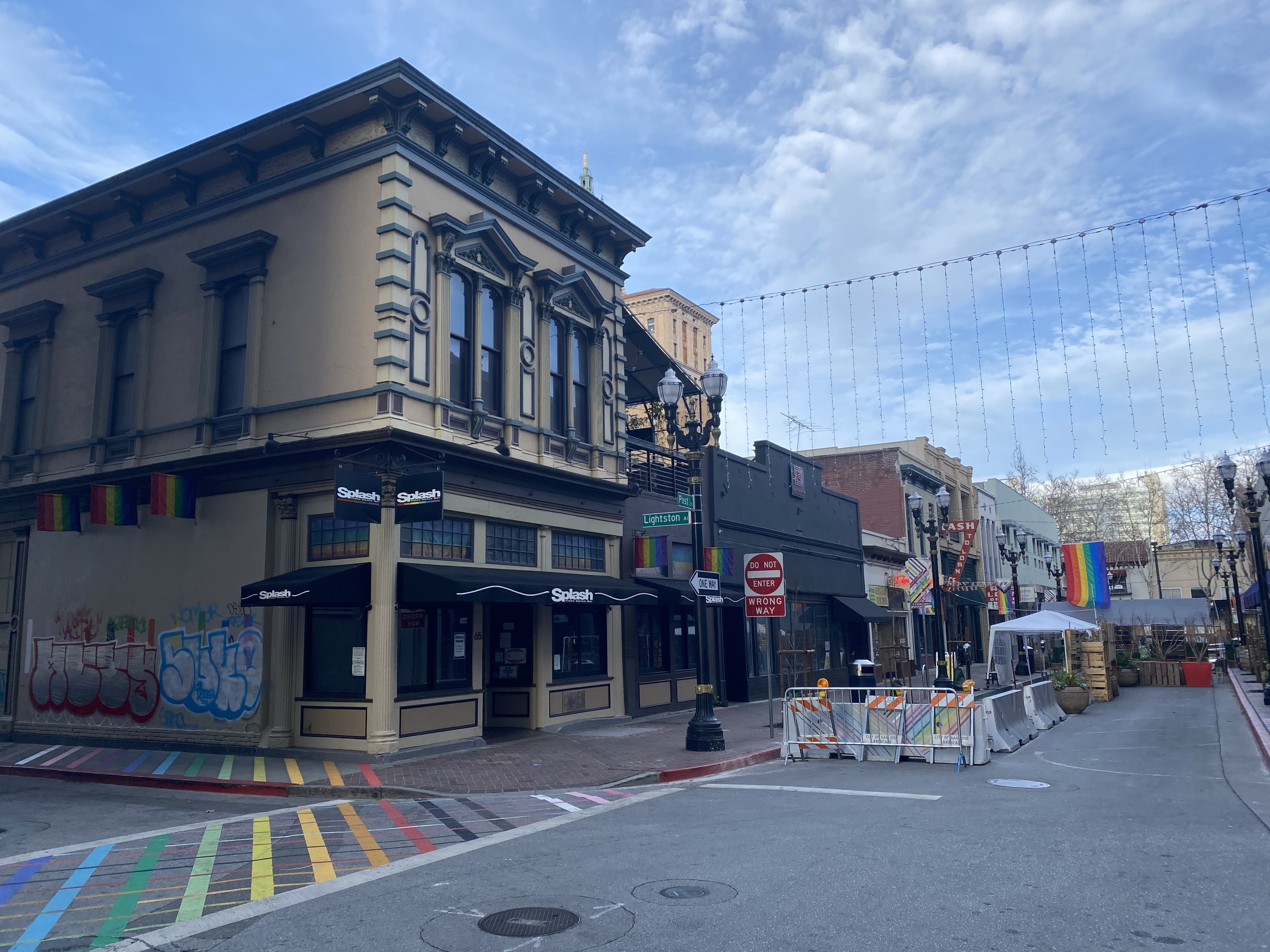

- Location within San Jose, California
- Coordinates: 37.334937°N 121.890634°W
- Country: United States
- State: California
- City: San Jose
- ZIP Code: 95113

The Qmunity District is a gay neighborhood located in Downtown San Jose, California.

== History ==
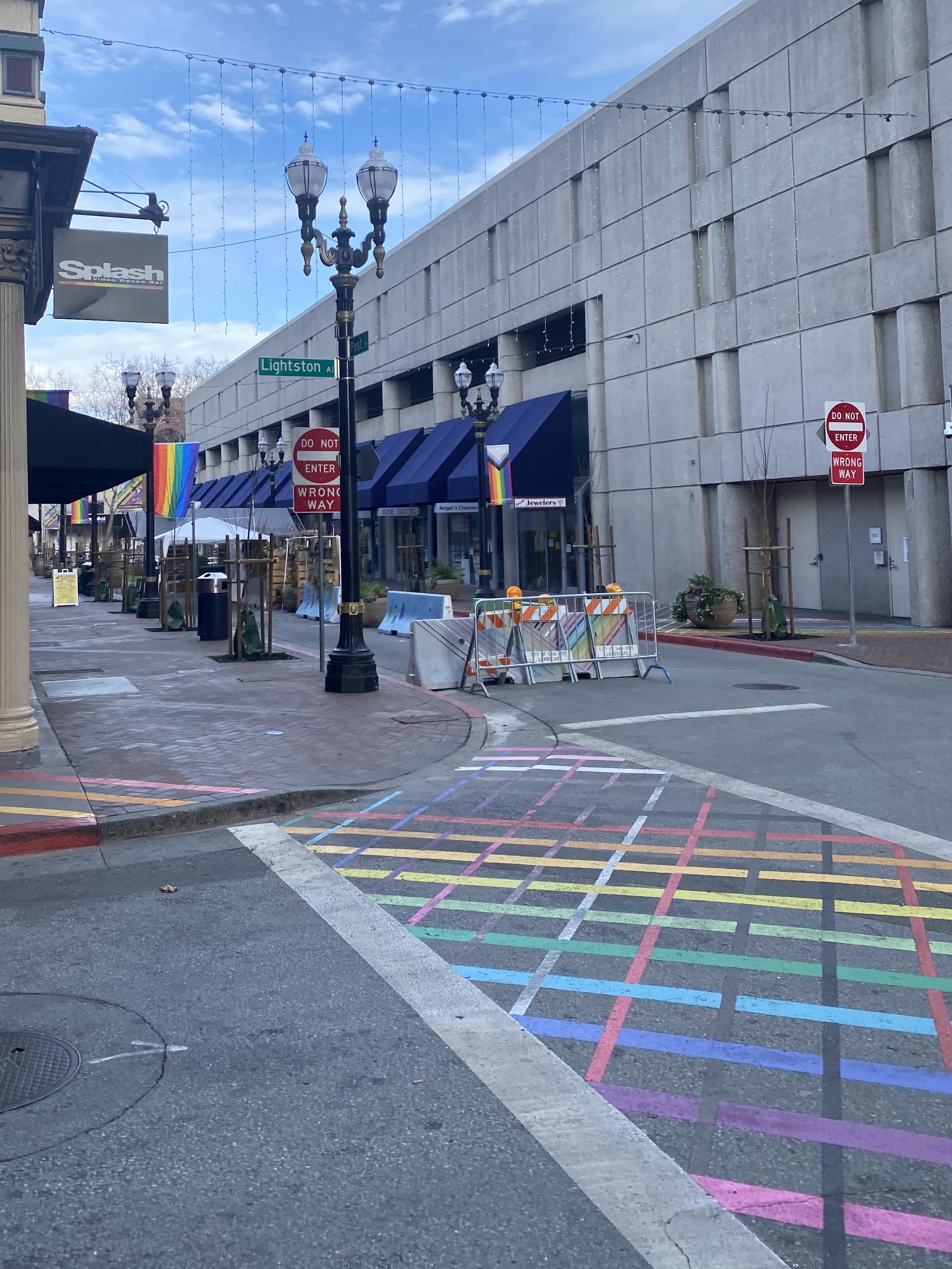
Post Street.

The district was formally designated in 2020 by city and downtown leaders to create an LGBTQ district in Downtown San Jose. The location of the district was chosen due to its being an important center of gay life within the city and the Silicon Valley high-tech culture.

== Culture ==
The district is home to a hub of gay bars, including the notable Splash Bar, one of San Jose's oldest.

== Geography ==
The Qmunity District is located in Downtown San Jose. Its boundaries are made up of Post Street, between 1st Street and Market Street, and intersected by Lightston Alley.
