= Rome Jazz Festival =

Annual jazz event in Rome, Italy

Roma Jazz Festival
- Genre: Jazz
- Locations: Rome, Italy
- Website: www.romajazzfestival.it

The Roma Jazz Festival is an annual jazz event in the city of Rome, Italy. It runs for two weeks every October and November, showcasing jazz and experimental music.

The Festival is organized by the International Music Festival Foundation (IMF).

== History ==
In 1976, the Roma Jazz Festival was born amidst the ambiance of the “Roman Summer” demonstrations; however, after a few years, the festival took on its own identity in EUR area of Rome, performing on the main staircase of the Palazzo della Civiltà e del Lavoro. Subsequently, the event moved to the Tre Fontane area of Rome upon construction of the Euritmia performance venue. More recently, the festival transferred its location to the Foro Italico near the Roman Tennis Stadium.

In 1996, the festival renewed its identity transforming itself from a summer event to an autumn artistic celebration, bringing back music more suited to listening while also further elevating the musical and artistic talent.

== Themes ==
Over the years, through the selection of new artist and musicians, the festival has focused on and voiced two central themes: The Great Jazz Cultural Expression of the 900's and Jazz as Ecumenical Music so that, by way of the common language of music, the festival has united humankind around the world.

== Artists ==
The Roma Jazz Festival has presented its listeners more than 900 concerts during its 33 annual celebrations, with a total attendance of one million people.

Artists involved today include:

- Miles Davis
- Dizzy Gillespie
- Sarah Vaughan
- John McLaughlin
- Gato Barbieri
- Joe Henderson
- The Manhattan Transfer
- George Benson
- Gerry Mulligan
- Richard Galliano
- John Scofield
- Pat Metheny
- Fats Domino
- Woody Herman
- Ray Charles
- Betty Carter
- B.B. King
- Bob Dylan
- Eloise January
- Tania Maria
- McCoy Tyner
- Yellowjackets
- Egberto Gismonti
- Dee Dee Bridgewater
- Chick Corea
- Michael Becker
- Jim Hall
- Elvin Jones
- David Murray
- Pharoah Sanders
- Michel Camilo
- Norah Jones
- Wayne Shorter
- Diana Krall
- Sonny Rollins
