= Transgender Memorial Garden =

Memorial in St. Louis, Missouri, US

The Transgender Memorial Garden is a memorial to transgender people killed by anti-LGBTQ violence. It is located at 2800 Wyoming Street (at California Ave) in the Benton Park West neighborhood of St. Louis, Missouri.

== Origins ==
It was formerly located at 1469 S. Vandeventer Avenue (at Hunt Ave) in The Grove neighborhood of St. Louis, Missouri. The former site of the memorial was planted with native Missouri trees and wildflowers and was created by volunteers in October and November 2015. The purpose of the memorial is to provide a space to mourn the loss of transgender people to violence and celebrate transgender lives. According to Jaimie Hileman, then board president of the St. Louis Metro Trans Umbrella Group (MTUG), the "garden serves both as a reminder of those whom we've lost and also as a very living and tangible symbol of hope in our city that tomorrow will be better days." It is believed to be the first memorial garden in the United States dedicated to the memory of transgender people.

The idea for the Transgender Memorial Garden first occurred to local chef, restaurateur, and drag performer Leon Braxton, Jr. (aka "Dieta Pepsi") who saw a Facebook post by Lewis E. Reed, president of the St. Louis Board of Aldermen, encouraging citizens to plant trees in neighborhood gathering spaces to create spaces of reflection as part of the second annual "Plant4PeaceSTL" event. Modeled after Nobel Laureate Wangari Maathai's Green Belt Movement, Plant4PeaceSTL encourages St. Louisans to plant trees to create a sense of unity, cohesion, encourage health, promote social equity, and spur economic development. It connects the disappearance of trees with other, larger social problems and engages citizens in creative local solutions. Trees for Plant4PeaceSTL were donated by Forest ReLeaf of Missouri. Reed's post encouraged St. Louisans to plants trees in public places to create spaces of reflection, memory, and contemplation.

Braxton thought Plant4PeaceSTL would be a good project for the St. Louis transgender community and he contacted the Aldermanic President's office to explore the idea. "I thought the #Plant4Peace project would be a great opportunity to support our St. Louis transgender community and those we have lost with a memorial or reflection park…so I contacted Reed's office about my wild idea just to see if it was even possible." A vacant lot was identified in The Grove neighborhood, a burgeoning area of restaurants, clubs, and LGBT nightlife. In an interview with local radio Braxton said, "I want people to think about how beautiful the space is and how peaceful. I want people to think of trans people as just normal, everyday people where they can enjoy life and not live in such fear."

Braxton's idea came to the attention of Jarek Steele, co-owner of local independent bookstore Left Bank Books and member of the Metro Trans Umbrella Group. The triangular site at the corner of Vandeventer and Hunt Avenues was owned by the City of St. Louis and a neighborhood business, which gave permission for the Memorial. At the apex of the triangular lot was a butterfly garden planted by Mission St. Louis but not well maintained. Steele identified a garden designer and organized volunteers who cleared the site and planted the Garden.

== Design ==
The Memorial was designed by Monte Abbott, a Missouri Master Gardener and local St. Louisan. Abbott's design philosophy aims to balance a site's microclimate with its socio-cultural purpose. Before planting, the Garden's soil consisted of construction fill from previous condemned buildings on the site, covered by a thin layer of rock, gravel, topsoil, grass, and weeds. The site is windy, well-drained, and slopes downhill toward the north. Accordingly, Abbott chose trees and plants that could withstand such conditions and survive with less care.

The original plan for the Memorial specified a row of eastern redbud (Cercis canadensis) trees running diagonally (southwest to northeast) along Vandeventer Avenue. A bed of Missouri native perennial wildflowers was planned for a triangular bed at the corner of Vandeventer and Hunt Aves. The plan also called for five rows of Hhackberry (Celtis occidentalis) trees running diagonally (southeast to northwest) perpendicular to Vandeventer Ave and the row of redbuds. Small groups of devil's walkingstick (Aralia spinosa) were planned for the northwest and northeast corners of the site. Irregular beds of native perennial wildflowers were planned for the western, northern, and eastern edges of the Memorial. A curvilinear path was planned to run from Hunt Avenue south, terminating in a circle at the center of the Memorial.

The design's repetition of linear rows of trees aims to create a sense of harmony though repetition. Specific trees and plants were selected as allegories of the trans experience: rare, overlooked, and aesthetically unconventional. Native perennials were selected to attract butterflies: whose life-course transition symbolizes the transgender experience. Redbuds can be rather plain small, ornamental trees in summer but are highly prized for their butter-yellow fall foliage and spectacular display of magenta flowers in early spring. Hackberry trees have bark not always considered beautiful, but produce berries that support a wide array of birds and other wildlife in winter. Devil's walkingstick is a large shrub or small tree having stems spiked with large thorns but a canopy topped with beautiful white flowers in mid-spring. Hackberry and aralia are undervalued plants and rarely used in conventional domestic gardens and commercial landscaping. The original design called for nine redbud trees, 17 hackberry trees, and six aralias.

== Planting ==
The Memorial was planted by 65 volunteers on the morning of October 18, 2015. After mowing and weeding, the original site consisted mostly of grass and weeds, with three ornamental crabapple (Malus) trees and a number of raised perennial beds toward the northeast corner of the site. Volunteers pruned the existing trees and mulched the beds before planting with new trees and wildflowers. They also cleared turf and weeds and outlined a curvilinear path running from Hunt Avenue, south to the center of the Memorial.

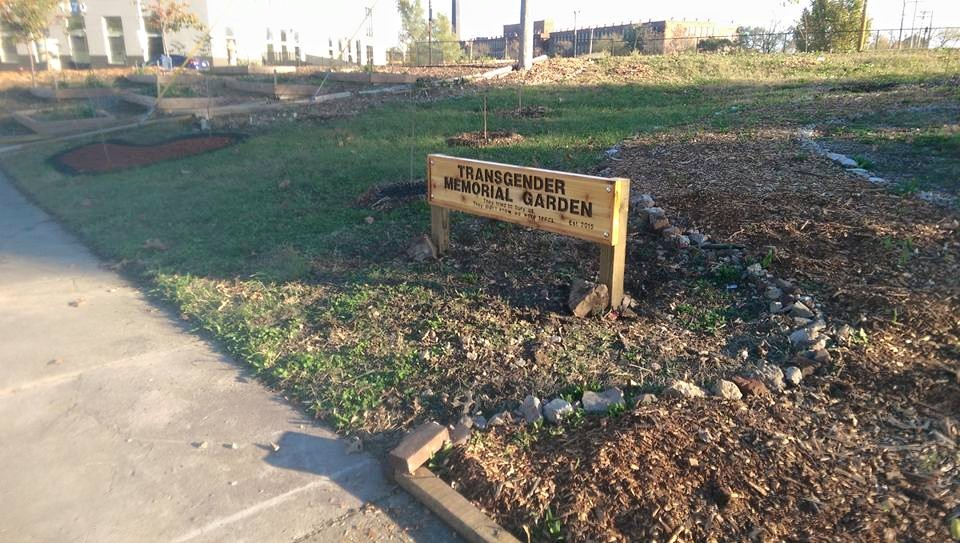

At the center of the wood-chip path volunteers placed a small pile of stones that were dug up when the Memorial was planted. Smaller stones unearthed in planting were used to line pathways and flower beds. During the Memorial's dedication, the reuse of the site's material was described by Metro Trans Umbrella Group executive director Sayer Johnson as symbolic of the transformation that occurs in transgender people's lives—from gender assigned at birth to lived gender.

A wooden sign for the Garden was created by Jarek Steele, an active member of MTUG and co-owner of Left Bank Books. The front of the sign is inscribed with the words "Transgender Memorial Garden Est. 2015" and the phrase, "They tried to bury us. They didn't know we were seeds." The source of this phrase is the writings of the Macedonian poet Dinos Christianopoulos. The sign is located at the northern edge of the Memorial facing onto Hunt Avenue.

Three benches were later donated by local St. Louis individuals and LGBTQ-owned business.

== Dedication ==
The Transgender Memorial Garden was dedicated during a ceremony held at dusk on November 20, 2015. November 20 is the Transgender Day of Remembrance that commemorates transgender individuals who have lost their lives to violence. A number of local activists, musical artists, and clergy addressed a crowd of about 50. Prominent transgender activists, scholars, and celebrities were also in attendance, including Kate Bornstein, Jennifer Finney Boylan, Candis Cayne, and Caitlyn Jenner. The dedication was filmed for the E! Entertainment television network's reality series I Am Cait, starring Jenner. The episode featuring the Memorial aired in the U.S. March 27, 2016. The dedication was followed by a march through The Grove neighborhood led by the Queer and Trans People of Color (QTPOC) organization, and a memorial service at the Metropolitan Community Church of Greater St. Louis.

== Vigil for Orlando nightclub shooting ==
On the evening of June 12, 2016, the Memorial was the terminus of a march and site of a vigil for victims of the mass shooting that occurred in the early morning hours of that day at Pulse gay nightclub in Orlando, Florida. A crowd estimated at 3000 people marched from the corner of Sarah Street and Manchester Avenue in The Grove neighborhood to the Garden. A candlelight vigil and rally occurred with speakers from the local St. Louis LGBTQ community, faith leaders, and politicians, and a performance by the Gateway Men's Chorus. In the days following the march and vigil, visitors to the Memorial left flowers, religious mementos, notes, and signs as tokens of remembrance.

== Vigil for Kiwi Herring ==
A vigil was held at the garden in the evening of August 23, 2017, in memory of Kiwi Herring, a transgender woman of color shot to death by police in north St. Louis. She was reportedly the 18th transgender person killed in 2017. Following the vigil, mourners marched in the streets and held an intersection of The Grove. The memorial gathering was disrupted when a black Mercedes accelerated into the crowd and hit at least three people. Driver Mark Calao was arrested following a police chase.

== See also ==
- Transgender activism
- List of LGBT monuments and memorials
- List of unlawfully killed transgender people
- History of transgender people in the United States
