= The Grove, St. Louis =

Business district in St. Louis, Missouri

Coordinates: 38°37′37″N 90°15′25″W

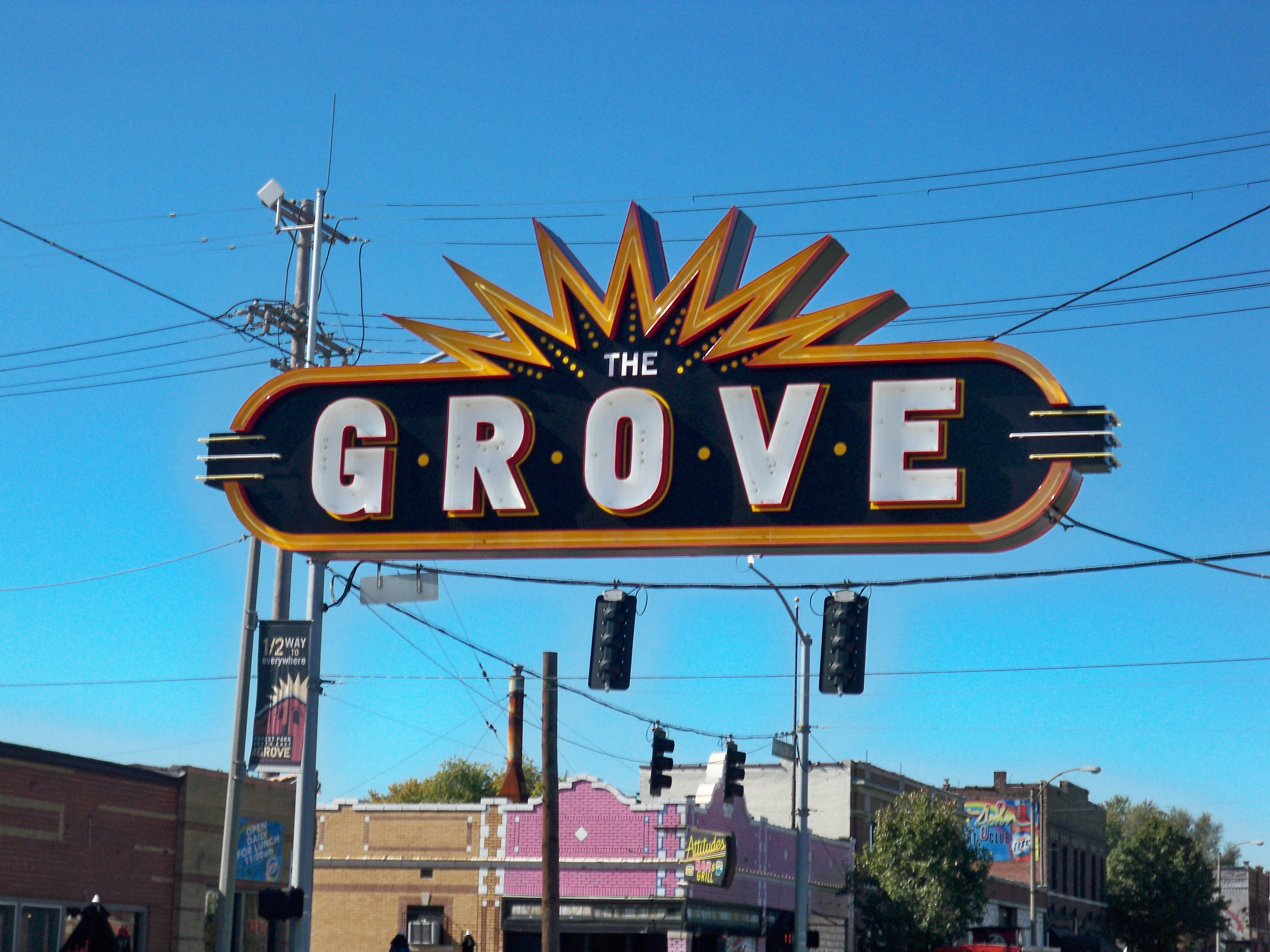
The Grove neon entry marker

The Grove is a business district located along Manchester Avenue (Missouri Route 100) between Kingshighway Boulevard and Vandeventer Avenue in the Forest Park Southeast (FPSE) neighborhood of St. Louis, Missouri. Formerly known as the Manchester Strip, the retail drag was first developed in the late 19th century to serve the working-class population of Forest Park Southeast. Today, the Grove is home to a variety of restaurants, bars, and clubs, including a significant number of LGBT-oriented establishments. The district is supported by a community improvement district (CID), created in 2009, which levies an additional sales tax on businesses within its boundaries to fund infrastructure and branding services.

The Grove is within walking distance of the Washington University Medical Center, Forest Park, and the Central West End and Cortex MetroLink light rail stations.

== Attractions ==
The Grove is a business district in St. Louis, and has several bars and restaurants. Several businesses were featured in the Best Of List of The Riverfront Times.

The Grove is also home to a growing number of public art pieces, primarily murals worked on by local artist Grace McCammond.

Recently, The Grove became the first area in St. Louis to install an overhanging neon sign to mark the entry of the business district. The Grove entry marker was a two-year, $60,000 project funded and facilitated by several neighborhood entities including Forest Park South Business Association, The Grove CID, Tarlton Corporation, and Washington University Redevelopment Medical Corporation.

== History ==
Property and business owners Chip Schloss (Atomic Cowboy), Guy Slay (Mangrove Properties) and Restoration St. Louis came up with "The Grove" as a catchy name to brand the business district. "The Grove" played off of "The Grove" located in Los Angeles. It used to be called "The Manchester Strip".

The first marketing scheme was called "Halfway To Everywhere", but has since been replaced by the new logo and website that asked the question "Are You In?".

== Culture ==
In the Grove you can find a variety of independently owned restaurants, nightlife, retail, and services. It is also home to the premier nightlife in the area, and is a thriving center for the LGBTQ, artist, and cycling communities in the St. Louis area.

A few blocks south of the main business corridor on Manchester Avenue is the Transgender Memorial Garden, believed to be the first of its kind in the nation.

== Events ==
The Grove has hosted Grove Fest for the past nine years, starting in 2005. Grove Fest is a neighborhood street festival that promotes its businesses, featuring live bands and DJs, street performers, food, beverage, clothing, jewelry, and art vendors and more. The 5th annual festival in 2010 included acts such as Messy Jiverson and Rockwell Knuckles.

The Grove also hosted the first Tour de Grove in the summer of 2010, previously Tour de Winghaven, organized largely by Big Shark Bicycles owner, Mike Weiss.

The Grove is known for being a strong center of the LGBT community in the St. Louis area. Each year, various Grove businesses and residents take part in St. Louis Pride Fest and host celebrations in The Grove.

== See also ==
- List of gay villages
