= Gay Street Historic District =

Historic district in Maryland, United States

- U.S. National Register of Historic Places
- U.S. Historic district
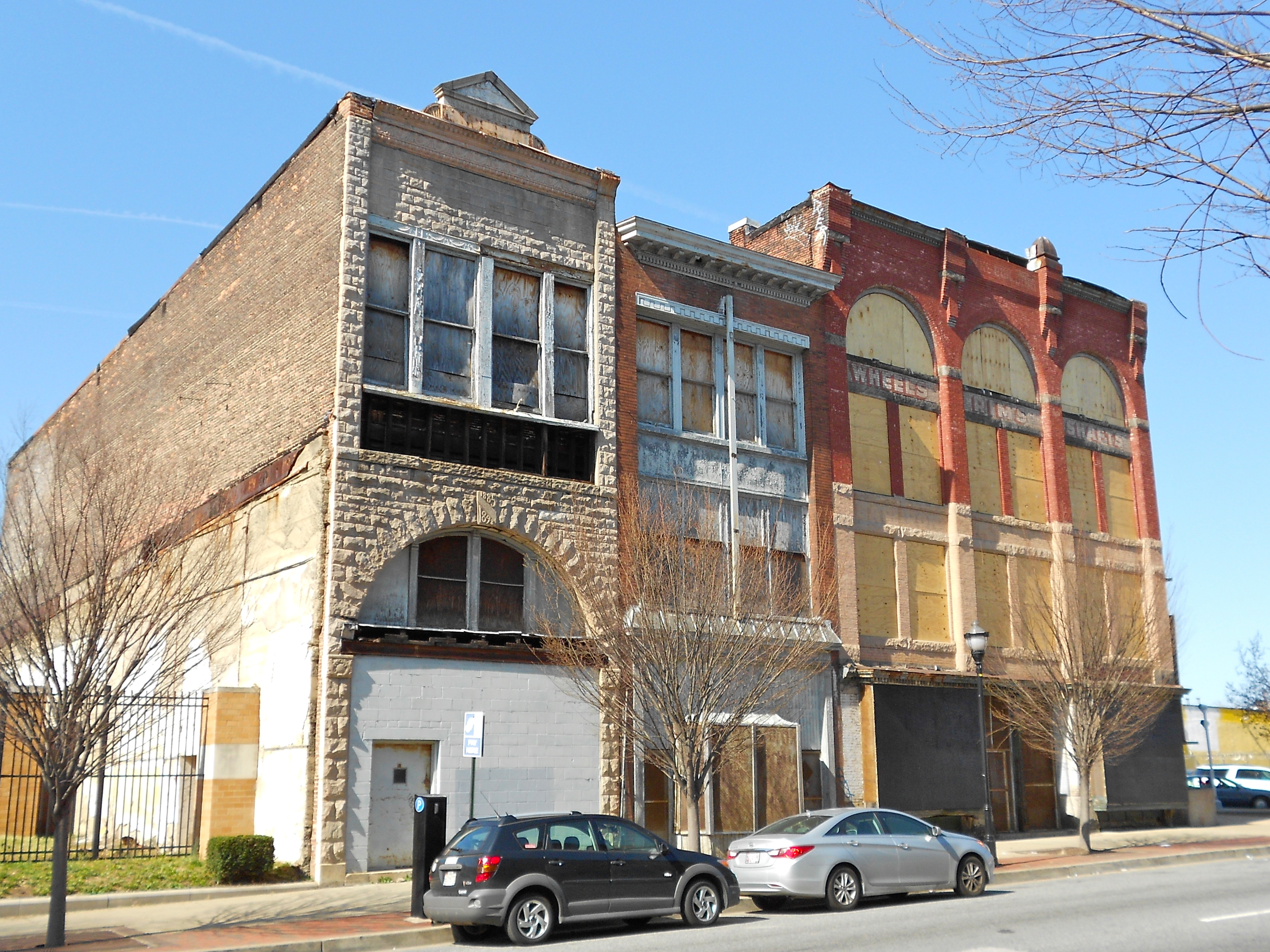
- Buildings at Gay and Exeter Street, March 2012

- Location within Baltimore Location within Maryland Location within the United States
- Location: Bounded by N. Gay, Fallsway, Low and N. Exeter Sts., Baltimore, Maryland
- Coordinates: 39°17′35″N 76°36′26″W
- Area: 11 acres (4.5 ha)
- Architect: Davis, Frank E.
- Architectural style: Federal, Late Victorian
- MPS: Cast Iron Architecture of Baltimore MPS
- NRHP reference No.: 03001173
- Added to NRHP: November 21, 2003

Gay Street Historic District is a national historic district in Baltimore, Maryland, United States. It is a notable example of a late-19th and early-20th century commercial corridor in a developing urban area. It includes a high concentration of small-scale commercial buildings or light manufacturing enterprise structures. It contains buildings displaying Victorian Eclectic, Beaux Arts, Italianate, and Romanesque elements, including two full-front, cast-iron buildings.

It was added to the National Register of Historic Places in 2003.
