= St. Louis PrideFest =

Annual event in Missouri

PrideFest St. Louis
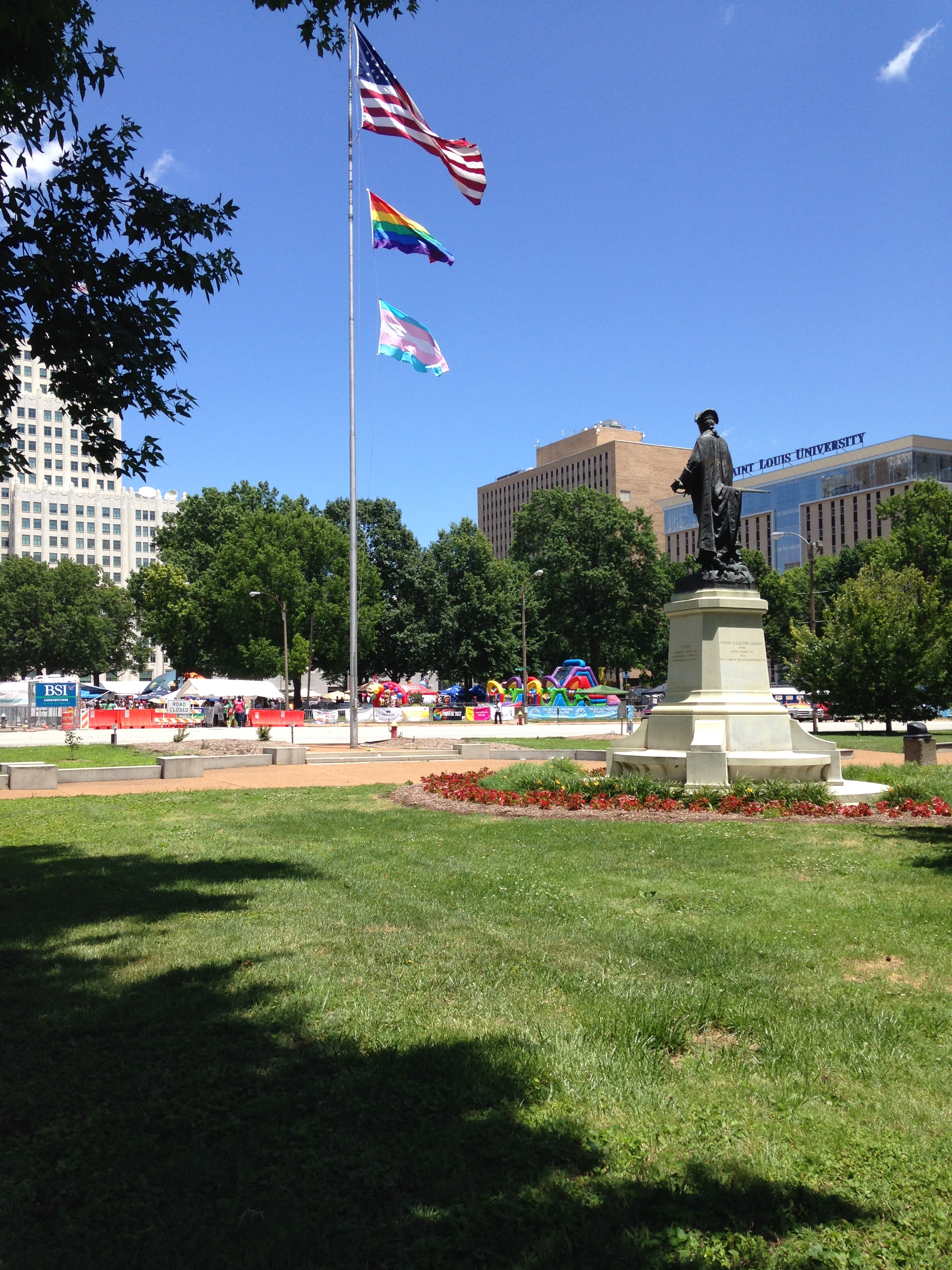
- Rainbow and transgender flags flying above City Hall; June 2017
- Status: Active
- Genre: Pride parade
- Inaugurated: 1980
- Organiser: Pride St. Louis

PrideFest St. Louis is an annual LGBTQ pride event in St. Louis, Missouri. The event is organized by Pride St. Louis, an LGBTQ non-profit organization in the Greater St. Louis area. Between 350,000 and 500,000 people attend the two day festival and grand parade.

== Overview ==
PrideFest St. Louis began in 1980 as the St. Louis Gay and Lesbian Pride Celebration. The theme began as "Celebration of Lesbian and Gay Pride" in 1980 and 1981, and changes yearly. The event is held annually during the last full weekend of June

The 2017 event took place on June 23, with Cleve Jones as the parade's grand marshal.

The 2018 event took place on June 23 once again in Downtown Saint Louis, at Soldiers Memorial. The theme was "Remember. Rise. Respect." Angelica Ross was grand marshal.

At the 2019 event, the transgender and rainbow flags were raised at St. Louis City Hall. The parade's grand marshal, Metro Trans Umbrella Group, resigned following the reversal of the decision to ask police to not wear uniforms in the parade.

Due to the COVID-19 pandemic in the United States, 2020 celebrations were conducted virtually. Organizers originally planned for a live, in-person PrideFest in 2021, but it was again postponed due to COVID-19.

The theme of the 2022 event was "Together Again" in commemoration of the return to in person festivities.

The theme of the 2024 event was "Unleash Your Pride." The parade was sponsored by Boeing, sparking protests among the local LGBTQ community due to the company's production of weapons for the Israeli invasion of the Gaza Strip. One protest delayed the parade by an hour, after festival organizers asked St. Louis Metropolitan Police Department to arrest 19 people blocking the route.

== History ==
What became known as the St. Louis Lesbian & Gay Pride Celebration Committee began in 1979, but the first St. Louis Gay and Lesbian Pride Celebration did not occur until 1980. This event was sponsored by the Magnolia Committee – named for the street where the majority of the members lived and had their meetings. Their combined effort with a second organization resulted in a week's worth of activities held in April 1980. At the end of the week, hundreds gathered for "The Lesbians and Gays Walk for Charity", which went down Lindell Boulevard in the Central West End to Washington University's quadrangle. These two combined groups then became the St. Louis Lesbian & Gay Pride Celebration Committee.

At the same time, writer Jim Thomas invited representatives from organizations around town to a meeting to begin discussions for an annual celebration. It was to be held in June as a tribute to the Stonewall Riots which occurred the last weekend of June in 1969. Each participating organization, still able to keep their identity in individual events, would form a larger group – creating a greater whole. At the time, the celebration consisted of a picnic in the beginning of the week and a march at the end.

Thus began a tradition which is still strong today in St. Louis. June is now known as Gay and Lesbian Pride Month, and since the first PrideFest in 1981, the event has grown in size, attendance, and scope.

== Festival ==
In the 1980s and 1990s, Pride was held in the Central West End and Forest Park. By the late 1990s, festivities were moved to Tower Grove Park. In 2013, PrideFest and the annual parade moved to downtown St. Louis. It has since been held at Soldiers Memorial, with the support of local officials, LGBTQ organizations, and the City of Saint Louis.

Attendance
Year	Estimated attendance
2011	85,000
2012	100,000+
2014	150,000
2015	200,000+
2017	300,000
2020	virtual

== Parade ==
The Pride Parade has served as a method for legislators and candidates to illustrate their support of the LGBTQ community.

When on South Grand, the parade started from South Grand Boulevard and Utah Street, passing Arsenal Street to Tower Grove Park. The parade route is now along Market Street in Downtown St. Louis.

== See also ==
- LGBTQ culture in St. Louis
- LGBTQ rights in Missouri
