= Gay Street (Rome) =

Area of Rome, Italy

Coordinates: 41.889604°N 12.496019°E

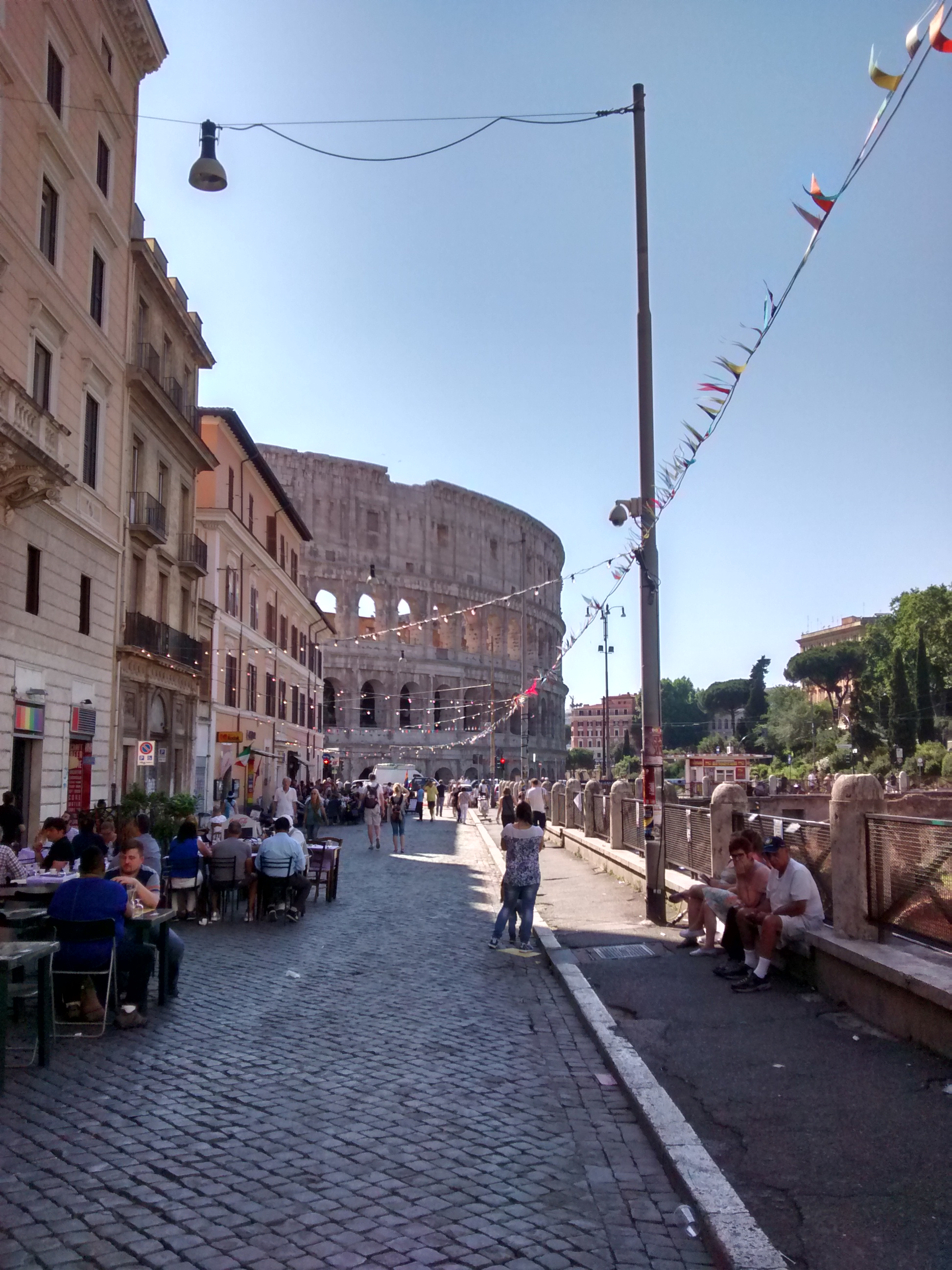
Gay Street

The Gay Street (Italian: Gay Street di Roma) is an area in Rome, Italy designated as a gay- and lesbian-friendly neighborhood. A 300-metre shopping and bar area in the center of the city on Via San Giovanni in Laterano, a street leading to the east flank of the Colosseum, it was formally designated in 2007. The opening ceremonies, led by the Italian LGBT organization Arcigay, were attended by celebrities and national and municipal politicians.

The heart of Gay Street di Roma is the café-bar Coming Out, which opened in 2001 and is a popular LGBT meeting place, especially on weekend evenings.

== See also ==
- Gay village

== Sources ==
- Gay street opens in Rome, USA Today
- (in Italian) Bacio gay, due giovani fermati al Colosseo — Corriere della Sera
- (in Italian) L'inaugurazione della Gay Street — Arcigay Roma
