= Central West End, St. Louis =

Neighborhood of St. Louis in Missouri, US

Coordinates: 38.6403°N 90.2548°W

Central West End
- Neighborhood of St. Louis
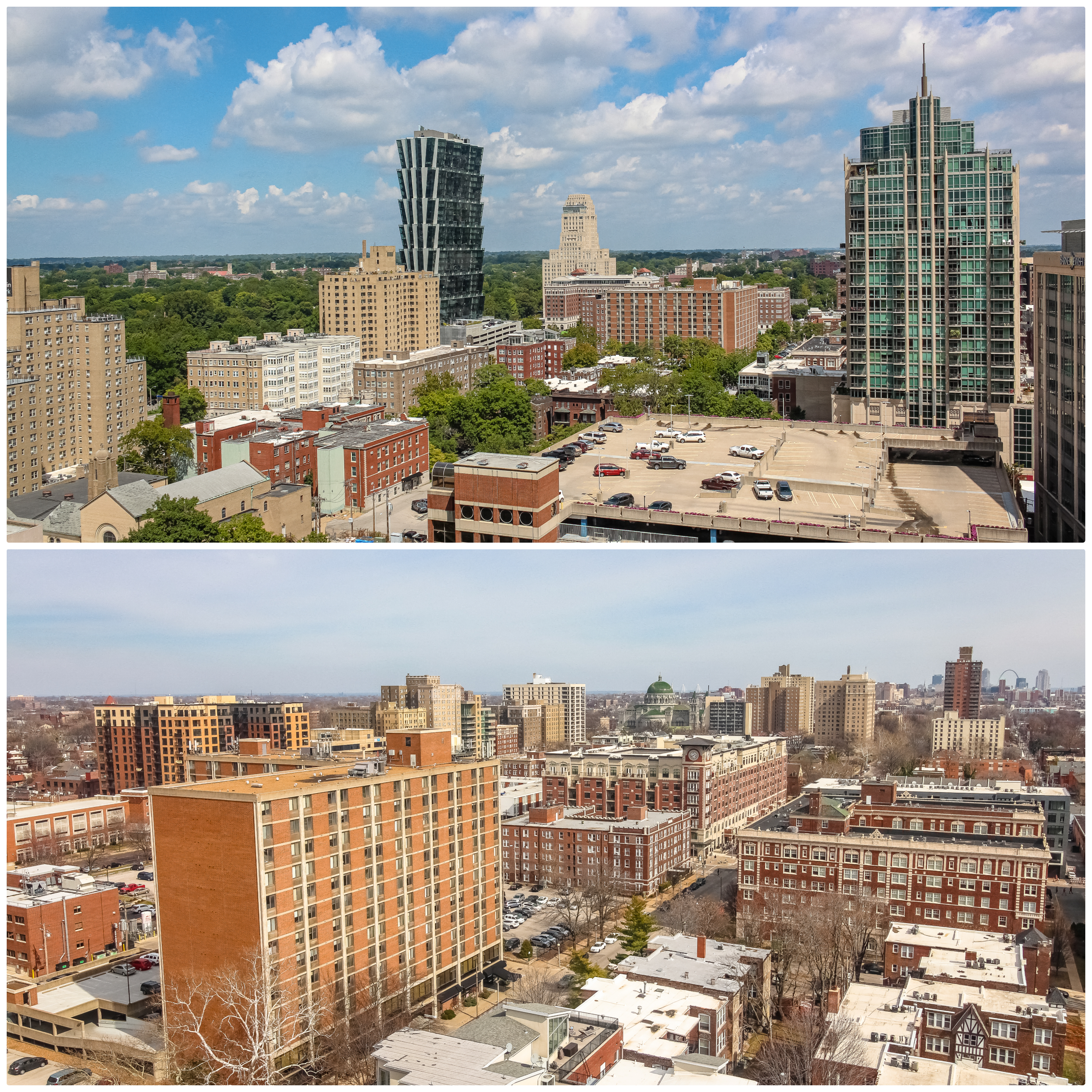
- Top: The Central West End's most prominent buildings as seen from Barnes-Jewish Hospital. Bottom: The Central West End seen from the Parc Frontenac apartment building.

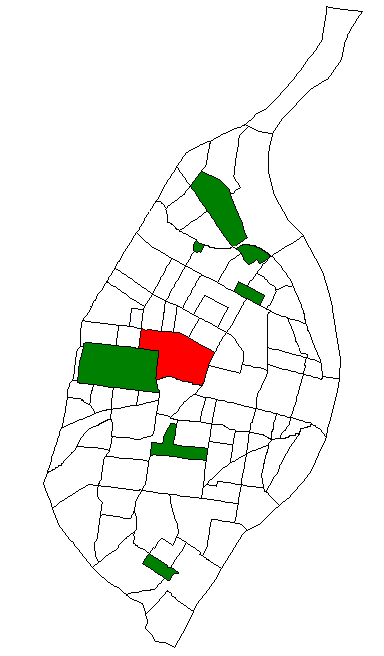
- Location (red) of the Central West End within St. Louis
- Country: United States
- State: Missouri
- City: St. Louis
- Ward: 9

Government
  - Alderperson: Michael Browning

Area
  - Total: 1.89 sq mi (4.9 km^{2})

Population (2020)
  - Total: 16,670
  - Density: 8,820/sq mi (3,410/km^{2})
- ZIP code(s): 63108, 63110
- Area code(s): 314
- Public transit: Red Blue; At Central West End, Cortex
- Website: stlouis-mo.gov

The Central West End is a neighborhood in St. Louis, Missouri, stretching from Midtown's western edge to Union Boulevard and bordering on Forest Park with its array of free cultural institutions. It includes the Cathedral Basilica of Saint Louis (the New Cathedral) on Lindell Boulevard at Newstead Avenue, which houses the second-largest collection of mosaics in the world. The Central West End sits entirely within the 9th Ward. As of the 2020 census, it is the most populous neighborhood in the city, surpassing Dutchtown.

== Notable people ==
Playwright Tennessee Williams grew up in the neighborhood, and the house of the renowned poet T. S. Eliot is located in the Central West End. Beat writer William S. Burroughs's childhood home sits on Pershing Avenue (formerly Berlin Avenue) in the neighborhood. It is often mistaken as the location of Sally Benson's home, 5135 Kensington Avenue, which is the setting of her stories which were adapted into the movie Meet Me in St. Louis. 5135 Kensington Avenue was actually located in the Academy neighborhood just across Delmar Boulevard. It is no longer standing, having been torn down in 1994 after years of neglect.

George Julian Zolnay (Gyula Zsolnay) (July 4, 1863 – May 1, 1949) the Hungarian and American sculptor known as the "Sculptor of the Confederacy" lived in the Central West End in the early 1900s at 4384 Maryland Avenue.

== Geography ==
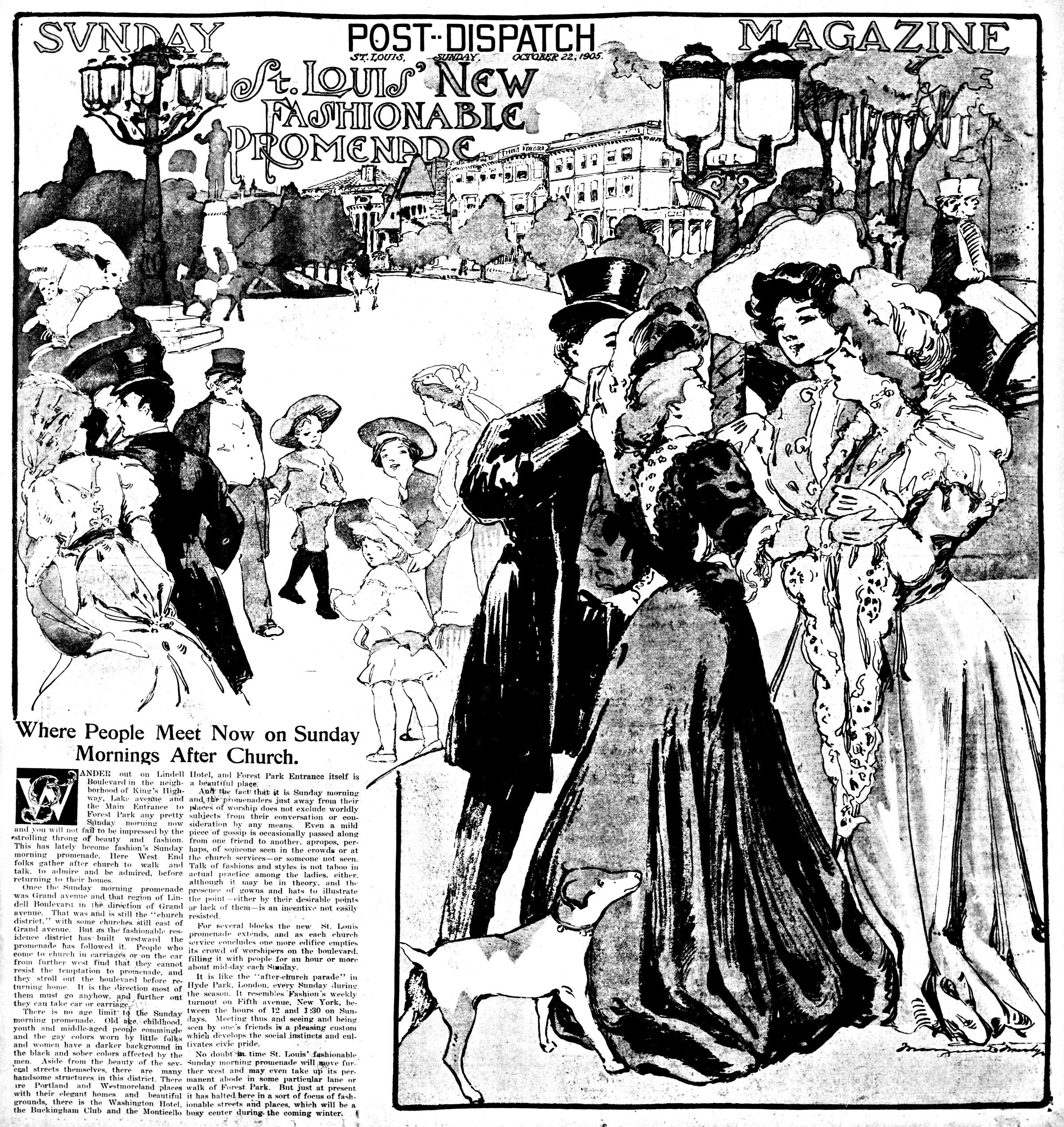
Lindell Boulevard in the neighborhood of King's Highway, Lake Avenue and the main entrance to Forest Park, as sketched by Marguerite Martyn for the St. Louis Post-Dispatch, October 22, 1905

The neighborhood's boundaries are Union Boulevard and the eastern portion of Forest Park on the west, I-64/US 40 on the south, Delmar Boulevard on the north, and Vandeventer Ave on the east.

The Central West End's main commercial district runs along Euclid Avenue and stretches from Forest Park Parkway on the south to Delmar Boulevard on the north. The neighborhood grew in popularity during the 1904 World's Fair, held in the adjacent Forest Park.

Some residential areas of the Central West End are included in the National Register of Historic Places. One example is Fullerton's Westminster Place, whose large, architect-designed homes, most of which were built in 1890–1910. Another is the private place called Washington Terrace, laid out in 1892. Modern residential buildings in Central West End include Park East Tower and One Hundred.

== Public facilities and commercial buildings ==
- Bel Air Motel; NRHP-listed
- Central West End MetroLink Station & MetroBus Center
- Cortex MetroLink Station
- Washington University Medical Center
  - Alvin J. Siteman Cancer Center
  - Barnes-Jewish Hospital
  - Central Institute for the Deaf
  - St. Louis Children's Hospital
- Goldfarb School of Nursing at Barnes-Jewish College
- Shriners Hospitals for Children
- University of Health Sciences and Pharmacy in St. Louis
- Cathedral Basilica of St. Louis
  - Catholic Charities of St. Louis
- Saint Louis Chess Club
- World Chess Hall of Fame
- Engineers' Club of Saint Louis
- Regional Justice Information Service
- Saint Louis Public Library - Schlafly Branch
- U. S. Postal Service - Marian Oldham Branch

== Neighborhood organizations ==
CWE Business Community Improvement District (CWEScene.com)

- Cathedral Square
- Fullerton's Westminster Place
- Washington Terrace
- 4200 Washington POA
- Maryland-Boyle
- Laclede Place Neighborhood Association
- Veiled Prophet Parade

== Demographics ==
Historical population
Year	Pop.	±%
1990	16,565	—
2000	14,144	−14.6%
2010	14,471	+2.3%
2020	16,670	+15.2%

In 2020 the neighborhood's population was 56.9% White, 21.0% Black, 0.1% Native American, 13.7% Asian, 6.4% Two or More Races, and 1.9% Some Other Race. 4.7% of the population was of Hispanic or Latino origin.

Racial composition	1990	2000	2010	2020
White	59.1%	55.5%	58.0%	56.9%
Black or African American	37.9%	36.4%	28.0%	21.0%
Hispanic or Latino (of any race)	N/A	2.0%	2.7%	4.7%
Asian	N/A	5.4%	11.1%	13.7%
Two or More Races	N/A	1.8%	2.2%	6.4%

== See also ==
- Delmar Loop
- Forest Park (St. Louis)
- Delmar Divide
- Portland and Westmoreland Places
