= Cortex station =

Light rail station in St. Louis, Missouri, US

Cortex
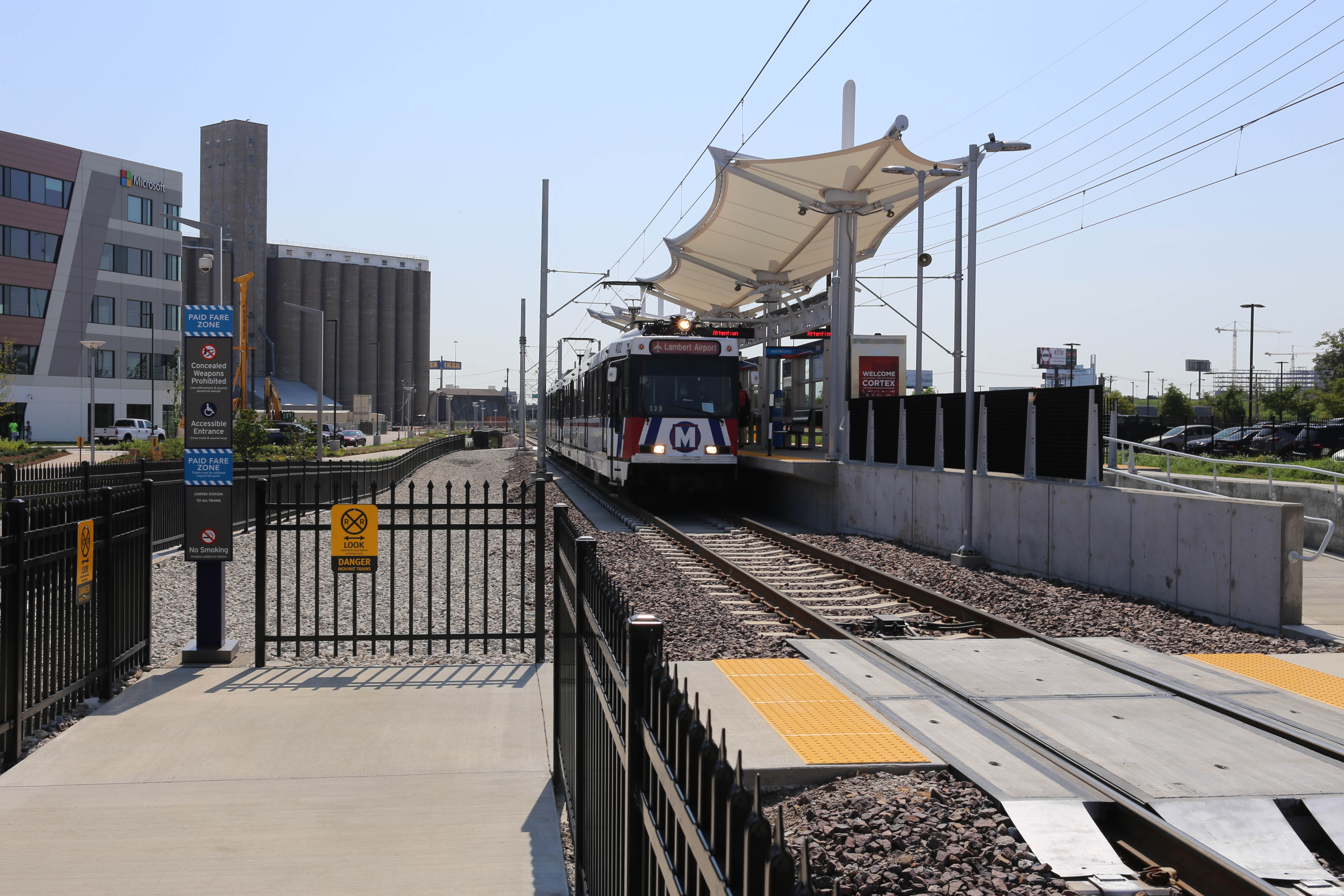
- Cortex station

General information
- Location: 448 South Boyle Avenue; St. Louis, Missouri
- Coordinates: 38.633700°N 90.251124°W
- Owner: Bi-State Development
- Operator: Metro Transit
- Platforms: 1 island platform
- Tracks: 2

Construction
- Structure type: At-grade
- Cycle facilities: Racks, Brickline Greenway
- Accessible: Yes

History
- Opened: July 31, 2018

Passengers
- 2018: 900 daily
- Rank: 19 out of 38

Services
Preceding station	MetroLink	Following station
Central West End toward Shrewsbury–Lansdowne I-44	Blue Line	Grand toward Fairview Heights
Central West End toward Lambert Airport Terminal 1	Red Line	Grand toward Shiloh–Scott
Location

Cortex station is a light rail station on the Red and Blue lines of the St. Louis MetroLink system. This at-grade station is located just east of Boyle Avenue in the Cortex Innovation Community in St. Louis.

== History ==
Cortex opened on July 31, 2018, as an infill station to serve the growing Cortex community in St. Louis' Central West End neighborhood. It was built as a public-private partnership between the Bi-State Development Agency (Metro), Washington University in St. Louis, BJC HealthCare, and the City of St. Louis.

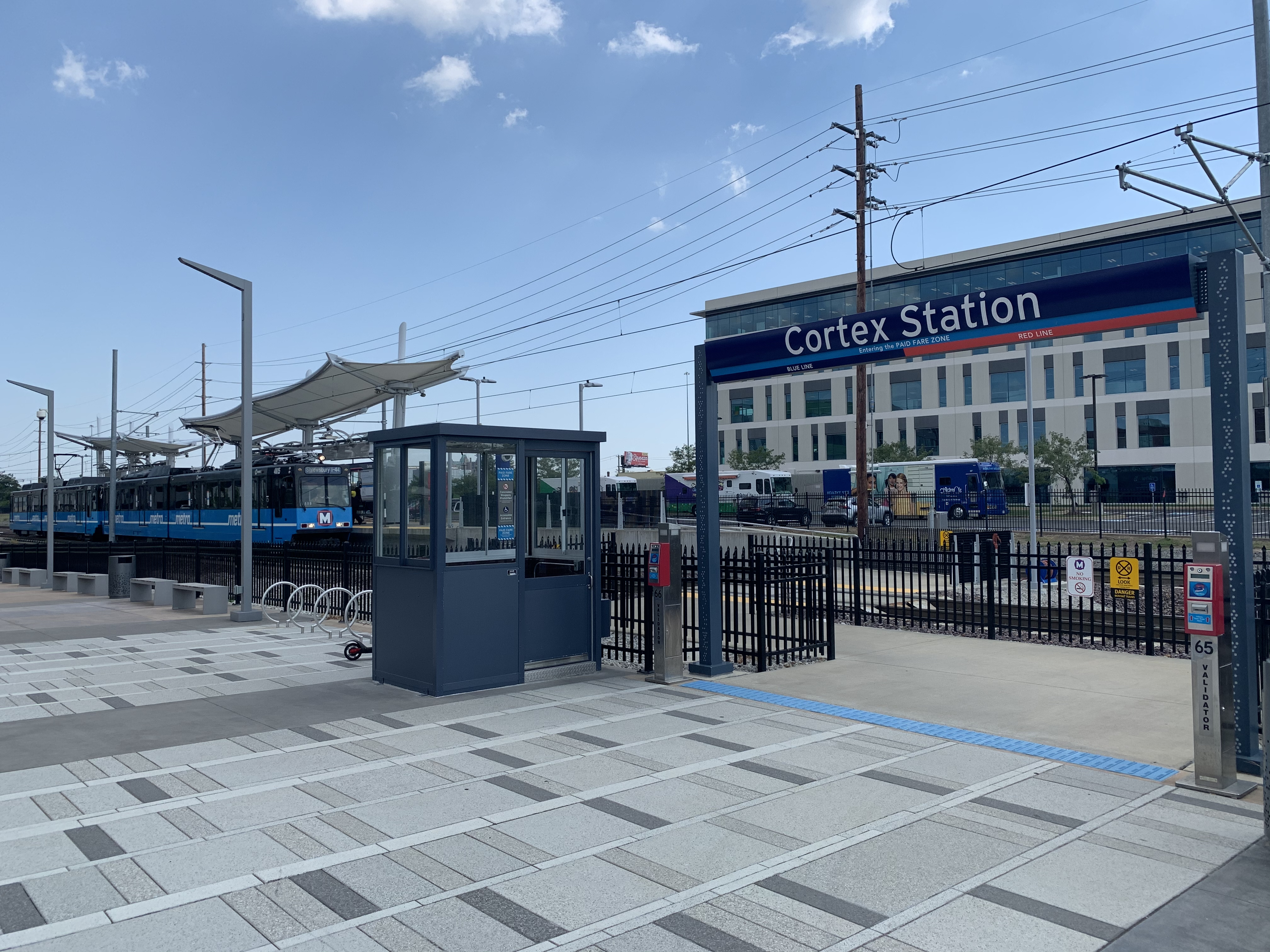
Station entrance prior to the installation of turnstiles

The Great Rivers Greenway District opened the first segment of the Brickline Greenway with the new station. The Brickline is slated to connect the Gateway Arch and Forest Park and to North and South St. Louis.

== Station layout ==
The platform is accessed via a single entrance from a plaza adjacent to the Brickline Greenway.

== Notable places nearby ==
- Brickline Greenway
- Central West End
- City Foundry
- Cortex Innovation Community
- The Grove
- IKEA
- Ronald McDonald House
- Washington University Medical Center
