= Central West End station =

Light rail station in St. Louis, Missouri, US

Central West End
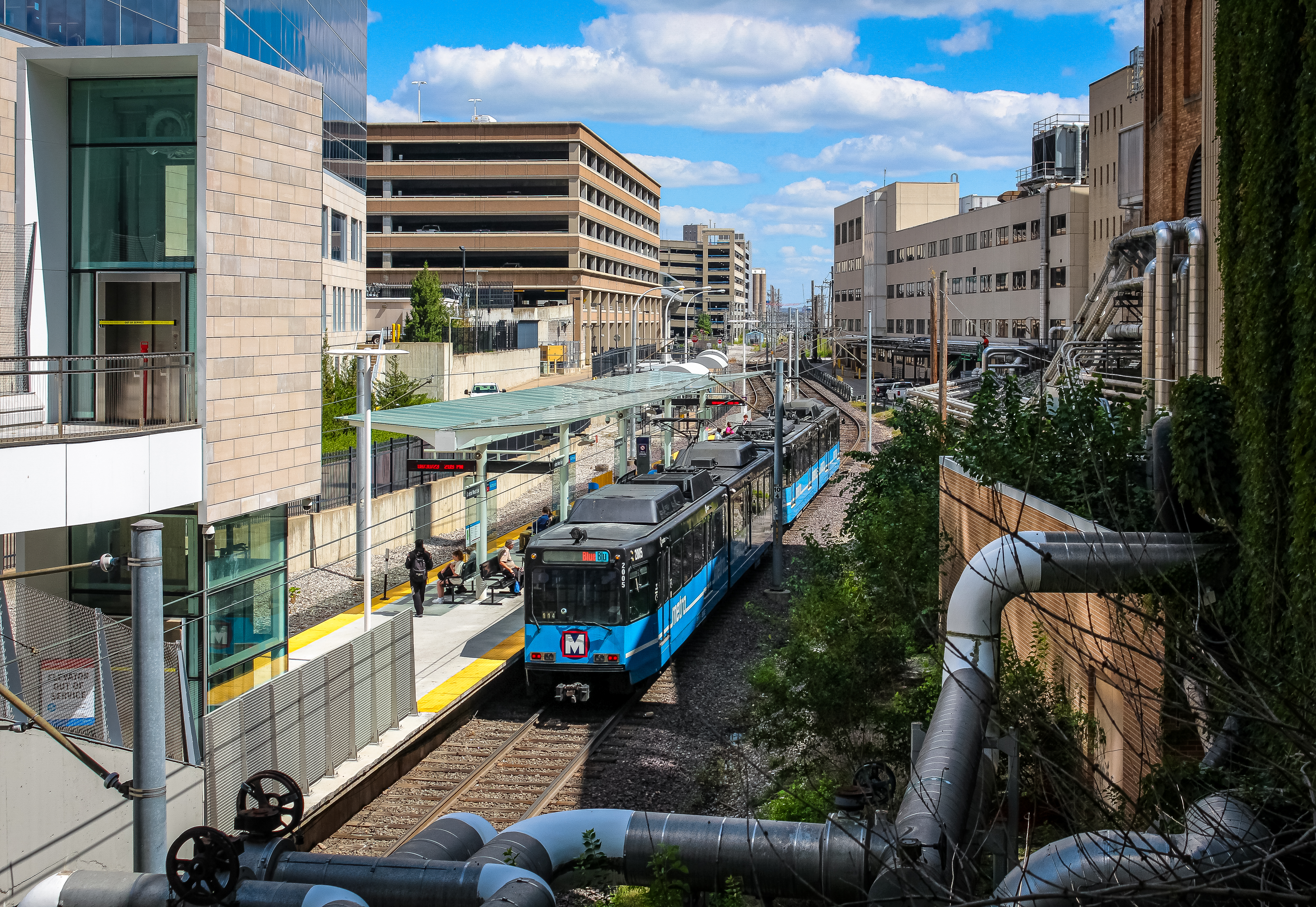
- An eastbound Blue Line train at Central West End

General information
- Location: 410 South Euclid Avenue; St. Louis, Missouri
- Coordinates: 38.635963°N 90.262489°W
- Owner: Bi-State Development
- Operator: Metro Transit
- Platforms: 1 island platform
- Tracks: 2
- Bus stands: 11
- Connections: MetroBus Missouri: 01, 08, 10, 13, 18, 42, 59, 95

Construction
- Structure type: At-grade
- Cycle facilities: Racks
- Accessible: Yes

History
- Opened: July 31, 1993
- Rebuilt: 2021

Passengers
- 2018: 4,885 daily
- Rank: 1 out of 38

Services
Preceding station	MetroLink	Following station
Forest Park–DeBaliviere toward Shrewsbury–Lansdowne I-44	Blue Line	Cortex toward Fairview Heights
Forest Park–DeBaliviere toward Lambert Airport Terminal 1	Red Line	Cortex toward Shiloh–Scott
Location

Central West End station is a light rail station on the Red and Blue lines of the St. Louis MetroLink system. This at-grade station is located in the Central West End neighborhood just southeast of the intersection of Euclid Avenue and Children's Place. This station also serves a large MetroBus transfer and is the most used station on the MetroLink system.

== History ==
In April 2021, Metro, in partnership with the Washington University School of Medicine and BJC HealthCare, completed a major upgrade to the station. Included was a new glass canopy covering 60% of the platform, a glass elevator outside of the path of pedestrian travel, a WUSM welcome center at the Euclid level entrance and exit, the main stairwell was widened from 6 feet (1.8 m) to 10 feet (3.0 m), additional lighting and fencing was added, and the station aesthetic was modified to match adjacent hospital buildings.

== Station layout ==
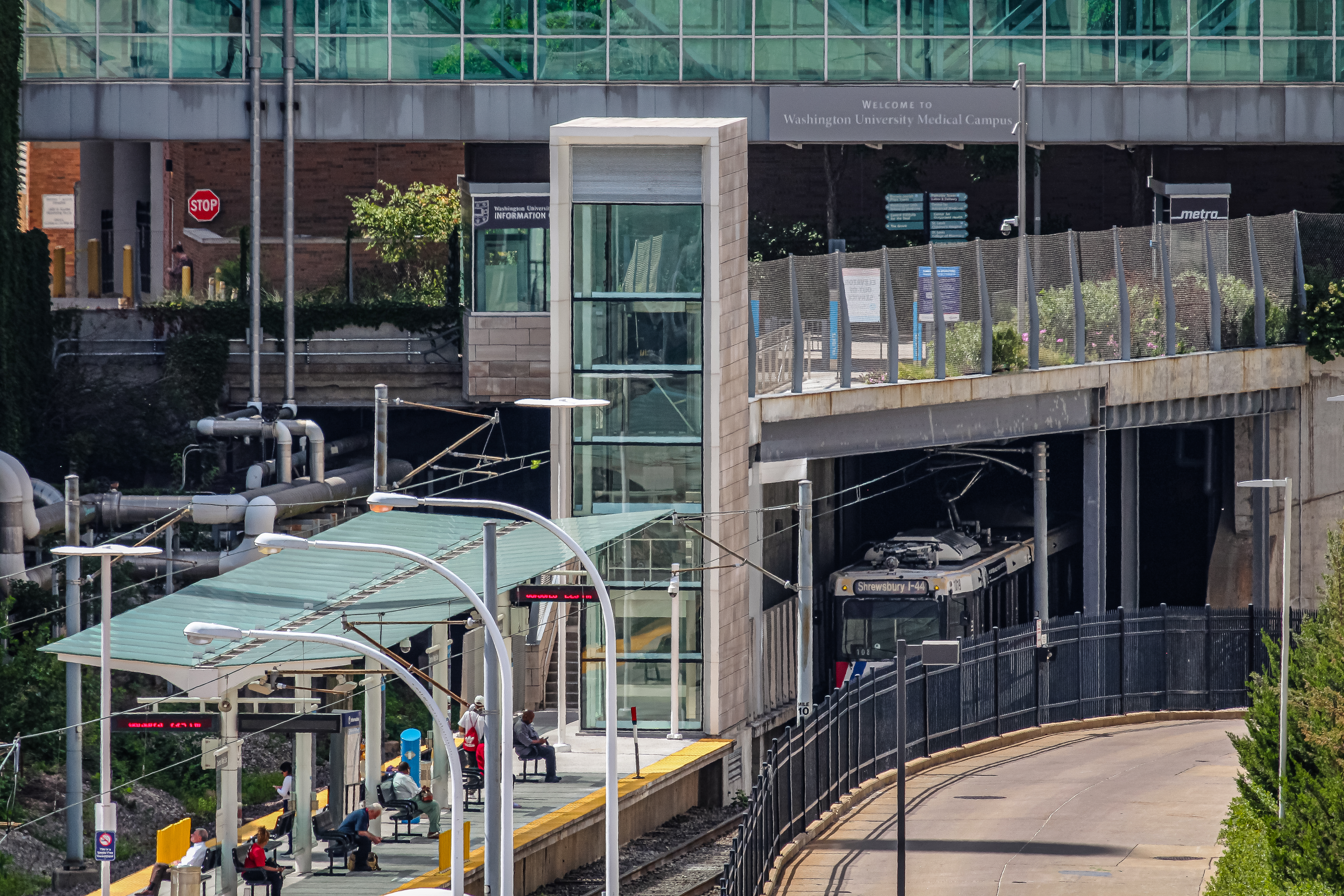
A westbound Blue Line train enters the tunnel beneath the Washington University Medical Center

The station can be accessed by stairs or an elevator at the west end of the platform near Euclid Avenue and Children's Place. The Central West End MetroBus Center is located on the ground level of the Barnes-Jewish staff parking garage and is accessible via lighted walkway from the east end of the platform.

== Bus connections ==
The following MetroBus lines serve the adjacent Central West End MetroBus Center:

- 01 Gold
- 08 Shaw-Cherokee
- 10 Gravois-Lindell
- 13 Union
- 18 Taylor
- 42 Sarah
- 59 Oakland
- 95 Kingshighway

== Public artwork ==
In 2000, Metro's Arts in Transit program commissioned the work Ohne Titel by Olafur Eliasson for installation in the tunnel near this station. The 60 aluminum lamp housings with colored acrylic lenses and fluorescent lamps work together to create dabs of glowing colors that span the tunnel wall in an evenly spaced spectrum.

== Notable places nearby ==
- Barnes-Jewish Hospital
- Central West End
- Forest Park
- Saint Louis Science Center
- St. Louis Children's Hospital
- The Grove
