= St. Louis Union Station =

Former railroad station in St. Louis, Missouri

Union Station St. Louis, MO
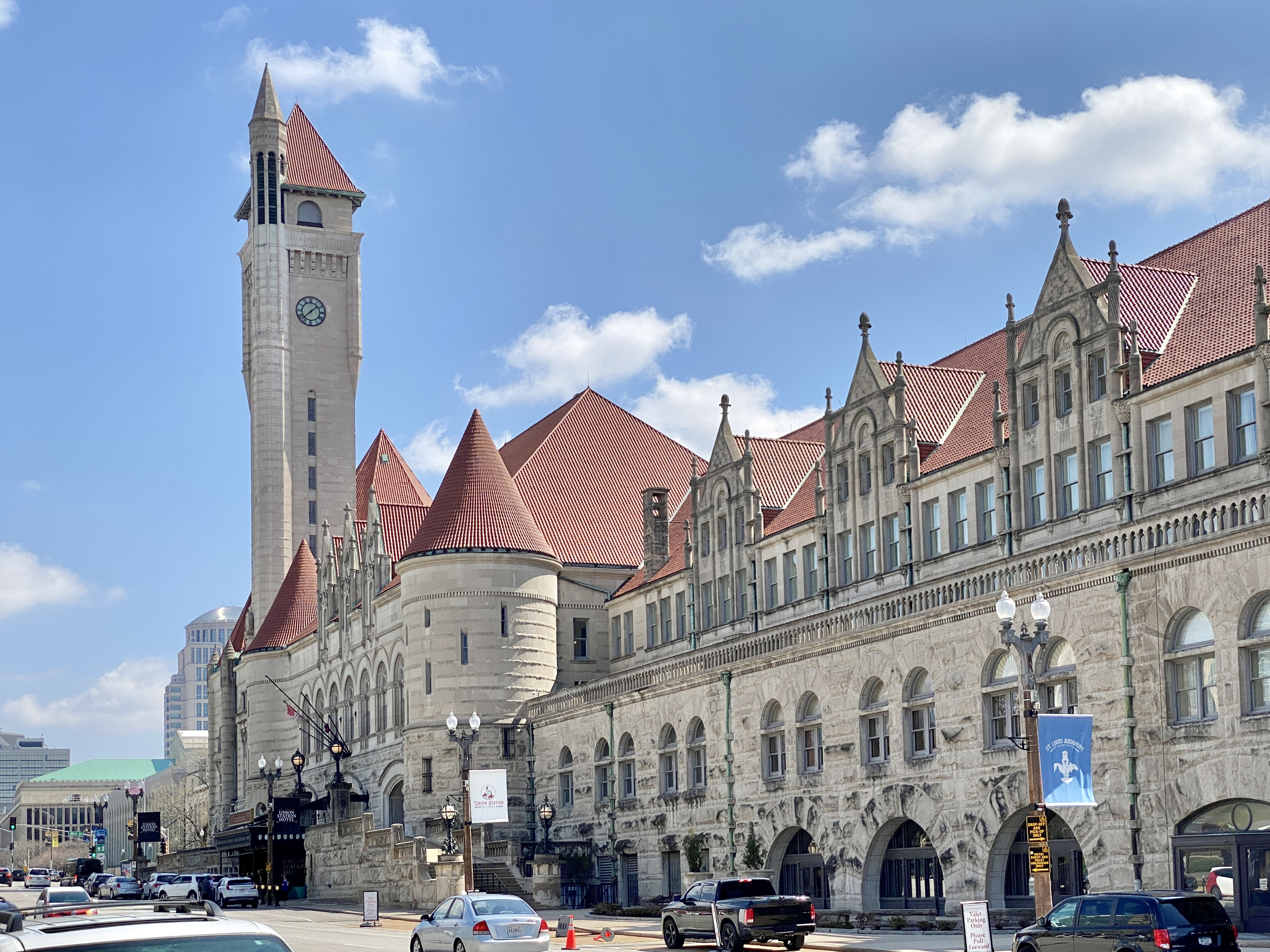

General information
- Location: 1820 Market Street; St. Louis, Missouri
- Owner: Lodging Hospitality Management
- Platforms: 3 island platforms
- Tracks: 4 (used for excursions)
- Connections: Red Blue; At Union Station (MetroLink)

Construction
- Parking: Yes
- Accessible: Yes

History
- Opened: 1894
- Closed: 1978 (original); 2016 (mall)
- Rebuilt: 1985 (mall/hotel); 2019 (aquarium)
Former services
Preceding station	Amtrak	Following station
Kirkwood toward Kansas City	National Limited	Effingham toward New York or Washington, D.C.
Poplar Bluff toward Laredo or Houston	Inter-American	Alton toward Chicago
Kirkwood toward Kansas City	Ann Rutledge	Alton toward Chicago
Terminus	State House	Alton toward Chicago
Belleville toward New Orleans	River Cities	Terminus
Preceding station	Chicago and Eastern Illinois Railroad	Following station
Terminus	Chicago – St. Louis	Washington Avenue toward Chicago
Preceding station	Chicago, Peoria and St. Louis Railroad	Following station
Terminus	Main Line	Washington Avenue toward Peoria
Preceding station	Chicago, Rock Island and Pacific Railroad	Following station
Vandeventer toward Kansas City	Kansas City – St. Louis	Terminus
Preceding station	Gulf, Mobile and Ohio Railroad	Following station
Terminus	Main Line	East St. Louis toward Mobile
Preceding station	Illinois Central Railroad	Following station
Terminus	St. Louis – Gilman	East St. Louis toward Gilman
Terminus	St. Louis – Carbondale	East St. Louis toward Carbondale
Preceding station	Louisville and Nashville Railroad	Following station
Terminus	St. Louis – Nashville	Washington Avenue toward Nashville
Terminus	St. Louis – Louisville	Washington Avenue toward Louisville
Preceding station	Missouri–Kansas–Texas Railroad	Following station
Machens toward Galveston	Main Line	Terminus
Preceding station	Missouri Pacific Railroad	Following station
Tower Grove toward Kansas City	Main Line	Terminus
Tower Grove toward Texarkana	Texarkana – St. Louis	Terminus
Tower Grove toward Memphis	St. Louis – Memphis	Terminus
Preceding station	New York Central Railroad	Following station
Terminus	Big Four Route Main Line	Terre Haute toward Cleveland
Terminus	Big Four Route Main Line	East St. Louis toward Cleveland
Preceding station	Nickel Plate Road	Following station
Terminus	St. Louis – Toledo	East St. Louis toward Toledo
Terminus	Cleveland – St. Louis	East St. Louis toward Cleveland
Preceding station	Pennsylvania Railroad	Following station
Terminus	St. Louis – Pittsburgh	East St. Louis toward Pittsburgh
Preceding station	St. Louis–San Francisco Railway	Following station
Tower Grove toward Oklahoma City	Main Line	Terminus
Tower Grove toward Memphis	Memphis – St. Louis	Terminus
Preceding station	St. Louis Southwestern Railway	Following station
Valley Junction toward Gatesville	Main Line	Terminus
Preceding station	Southern Railway	Following station
Terminus	St. Louis – Danville	East St. Louis toward Danville
Preceding station	Wabash Railroad	Following station
Vandeventer toward Kansas City	Main Line	Washington Avenue toward Chicago
Terminus	St. Louis – Detroit	Washington Avenue toward Detroit
Vandeventer toward Omaha	Omaha – St. Louis	Terminus
- St. Louis Union Station
- U.S. National Register of Historic Places
- U.S. National Historic Landmark
- St. Louis Landmark
- Interactive map of St. Louis Union Station
- Coordinates: 38°37′45″N 90°12′27″W
- Built: 1892–94
- Architect: Theodore Link
- Architectural style: Romanesque Revival, Richardsonian Romanesque
- NRHP reference No.: 70000888

Significant dates
- Added to NRHP: June 15, 1970
- Designated NHL: December 30, 1970
Location

St. Louis Union Station is a former train station and National Historic Landmark in St. Louis, Missouri, United States. Opened in 1894, it was the largest station in the world with 31 tracks under an enclosed train shed. Passenger traffic peaked at 100,000 people a day in the 1940s. The last Amtrak passenger train left the station in 1978.

In the 1980s, it was renovated as a hotel, shopping center, and entertainment complex. The 2010s and 2020s saw more renovation and expansion of entertainment and office capacity. The hotel at the station, operated under the Curio brand, is a member of Historic Hotels of America, the official program of the National Trust for Historic Preservation.

An adjacent station serves the MetroLink light rail system, which has two lines that run under the station in the Union Station subway tunnel. The city's intercity terminal, the Gateway Transportation Center, sits 1/4 mile (400 m) to the south, serving MetroLink, Amtrak, and Greyhound Bus.

== History ==
=== 19th century ===
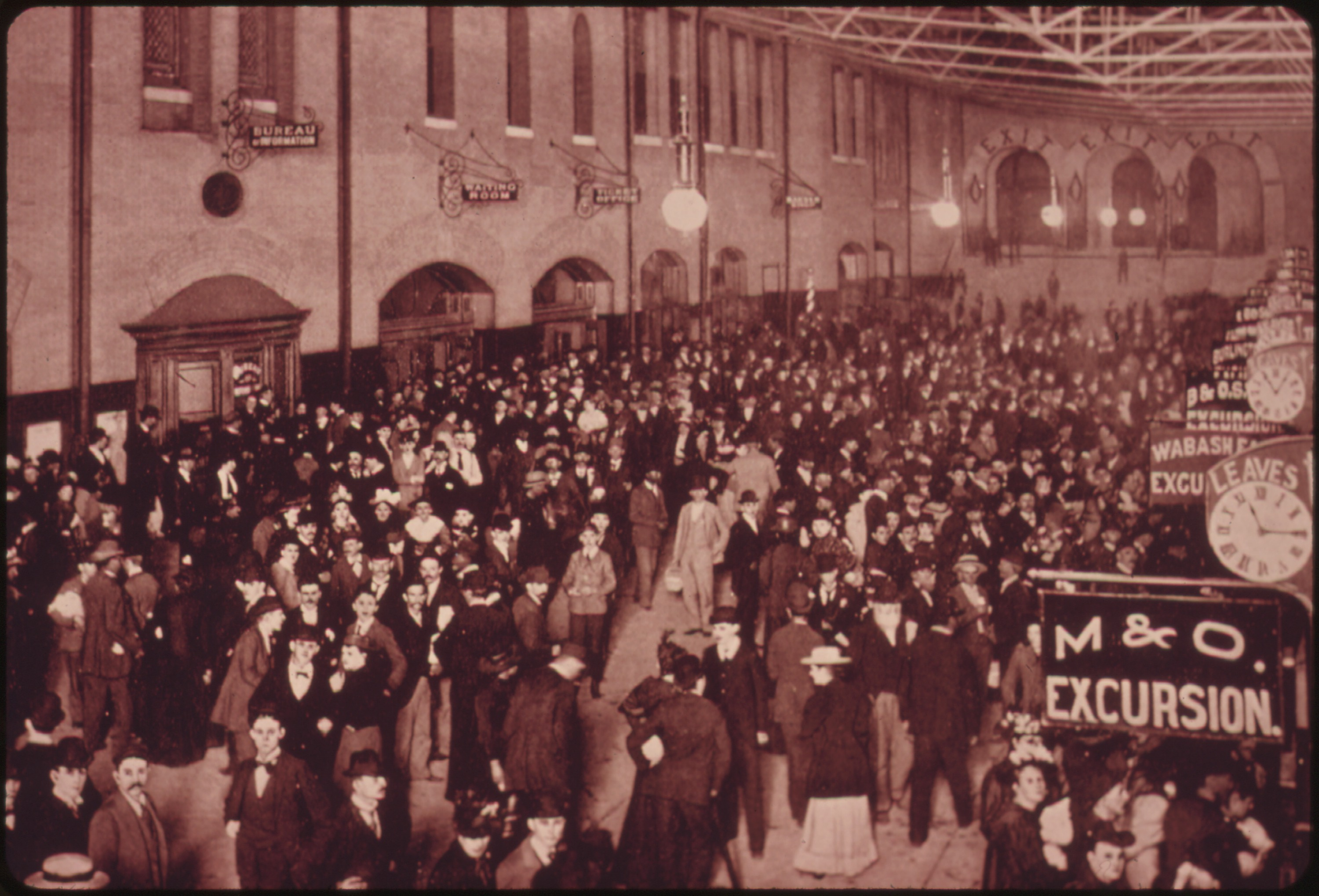
Union Station was the largest and busiest train station in the world in 1894.

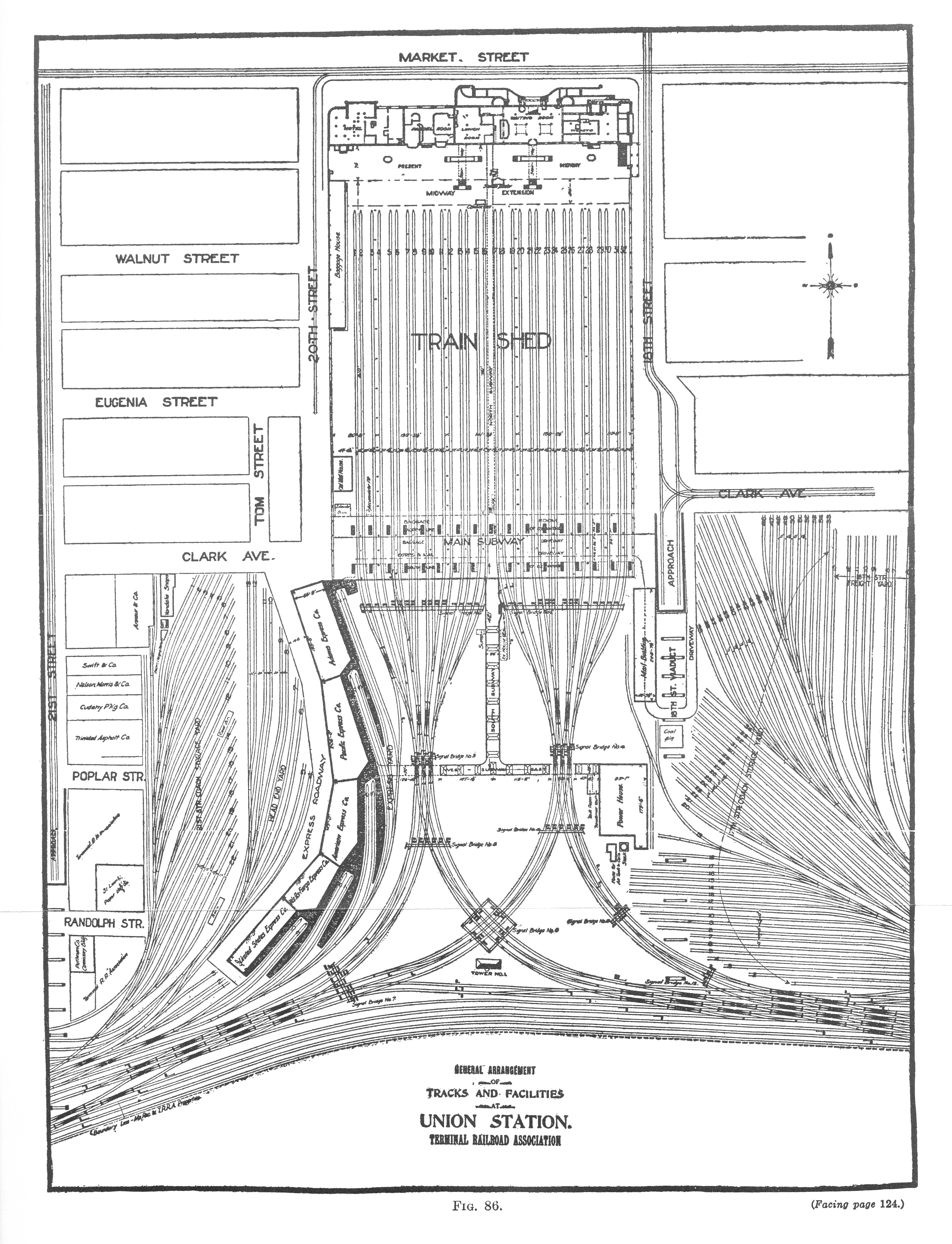
Original track layout

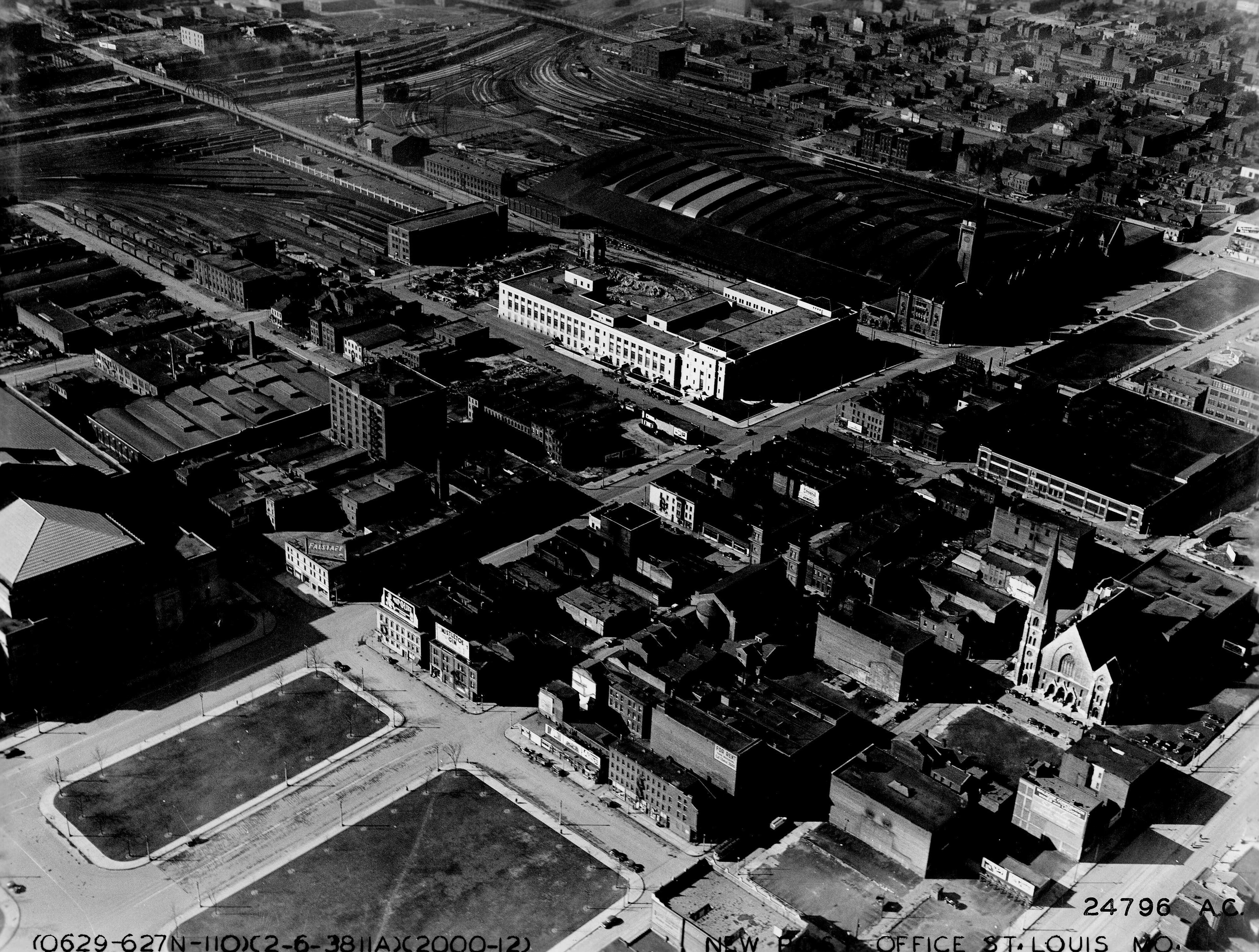
Aerial view, 1938

The station was opened on September 1, 1894, by the Terminal Railroad Association of St. Louis. The station was designed by Theodore Link, and included three main areas: the Headhouse and the Midway, and the 11.5-acre (47,000 m^{2}) Train Shed designed by civil engineer George H. Pegram. The headhouse originally housed a hotel, a restaurant, passenger waiting rooms and railroad ticketing offices. It featured a gold-leafed Grand Hall, Romanesque arches, a 65-foot (20 m) barrel-vaulted ceiling and stained-glass windows. The clock tower is 230 feet (70 m) high.

Union Station's headhouse and midway are constructed of Indiana limestone and initially included 32 tracks under its vast trainshed terminating in the stub-end terminal.

At its opening, it was the world's largest and busiest railroad station and its trainshed was the largest roof span in the world.

=== 20th century ===
In 1903, Union Station was expanded to accommodate visitors to the 1904 St. Louis World's Fair. In the 1920s, it remained the largest American railroad terminal.

At its height, the station combined the St. Louis passenger services of 22 railroads, the most of any single terminal in the world. In the 1940s, it handled 100,000 passengers a day. During World War II, German actor Til Kiwe, was recaptured in the station's waiting room after escaping from a POW camp in Colorado.

The 1940s expansion added a new ticket counter designed as a half-circle and a mural by Louis Grell could be found atop the customer waiting area which depicted the history of St. Louis with an old fashion steam engine, two large steamboats and the Eads Bridge in the background. The famous photograph of Harry S. Truman holding aloft the erroneous Chicago Tribune headline, "Dewey Defeats Truman", was shot at the station as Truman headed back to Washington, D.C., from Independence, Missouri, after the 1948 Presidential election.

As airliners became the primary mode of long-distance travel and railroad passenger services declined in the 1950s and 1960s, the massive station became obsolete and too expensive to maintain for its original purpose. By 1961, several tracks had been paved over for parking. Amtrak took over passenger service in 1971 but abandoned Union Station on October 31, 1978. By then, Amtrak had cut back service to four routes per day–the State House, the Ann Rutledge, the National Limited (formerly the Spirit of St. Louis) and the Inter-American. The eight total trains were nowhere near enough to justify the use of such a large facility. The last train to leave Union Station was a Chicago-bound Inter-American. Passenger service shifted to a temporary-style "Amshack" two blocks east. Amtrak has since moved its St. Louis service to the Gateway Transportation Center, one block east of Union Station.

The station was designated a National Historic Landmark in 1970, as an important surviving example of large-scale railroad architecture from the late 19th century. It was designated as a National Historic Civil Engineering Landmark by the American Society of Civil Engineers in 1981.

==== 1980s commercial redevelopment: Shopping mall and hotel ====
St. Louis Union Station
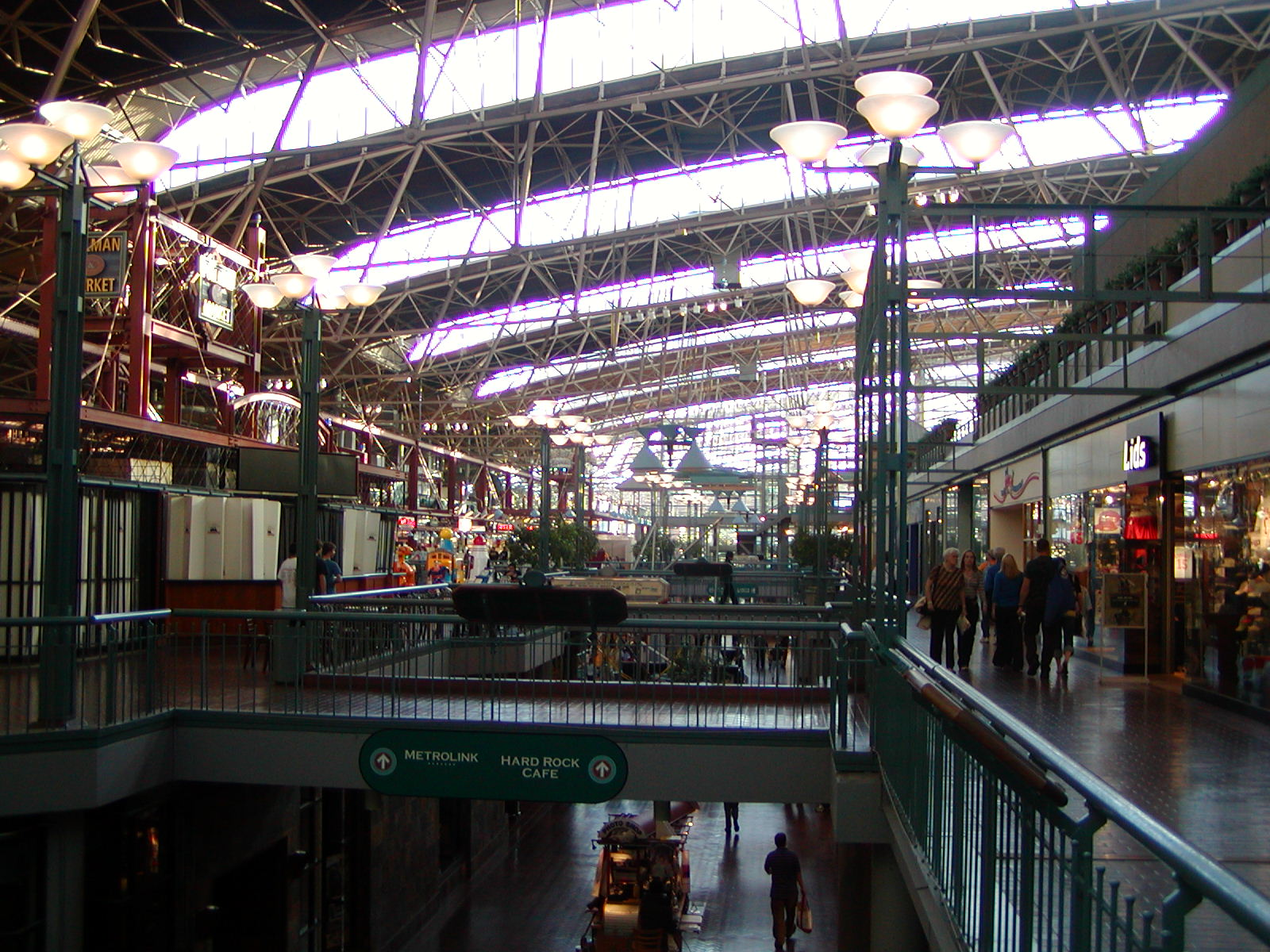
- Interior view of the mall (October 2007)
- Location: St. Louis, Missouri, U.S.
- Address: 1820 Market Street, 63103
- Opened: August 29, 1985; 41 years ago
- Closed: February 1, 2016; 10 years ago (mall interior; redeveloped into St. Louis Aquarium at Union Station)
- Demolished: November 2017 – December 2019 (mall interior only)
- Developer: The Rouse Company
- Owner: Lodging Hospitality Management
- Architect: HOK Group
- Num. of stores: 100+ (at peak)
- Floors: 2 (with partial third floor)
- Parking: Paid parking
- Building details
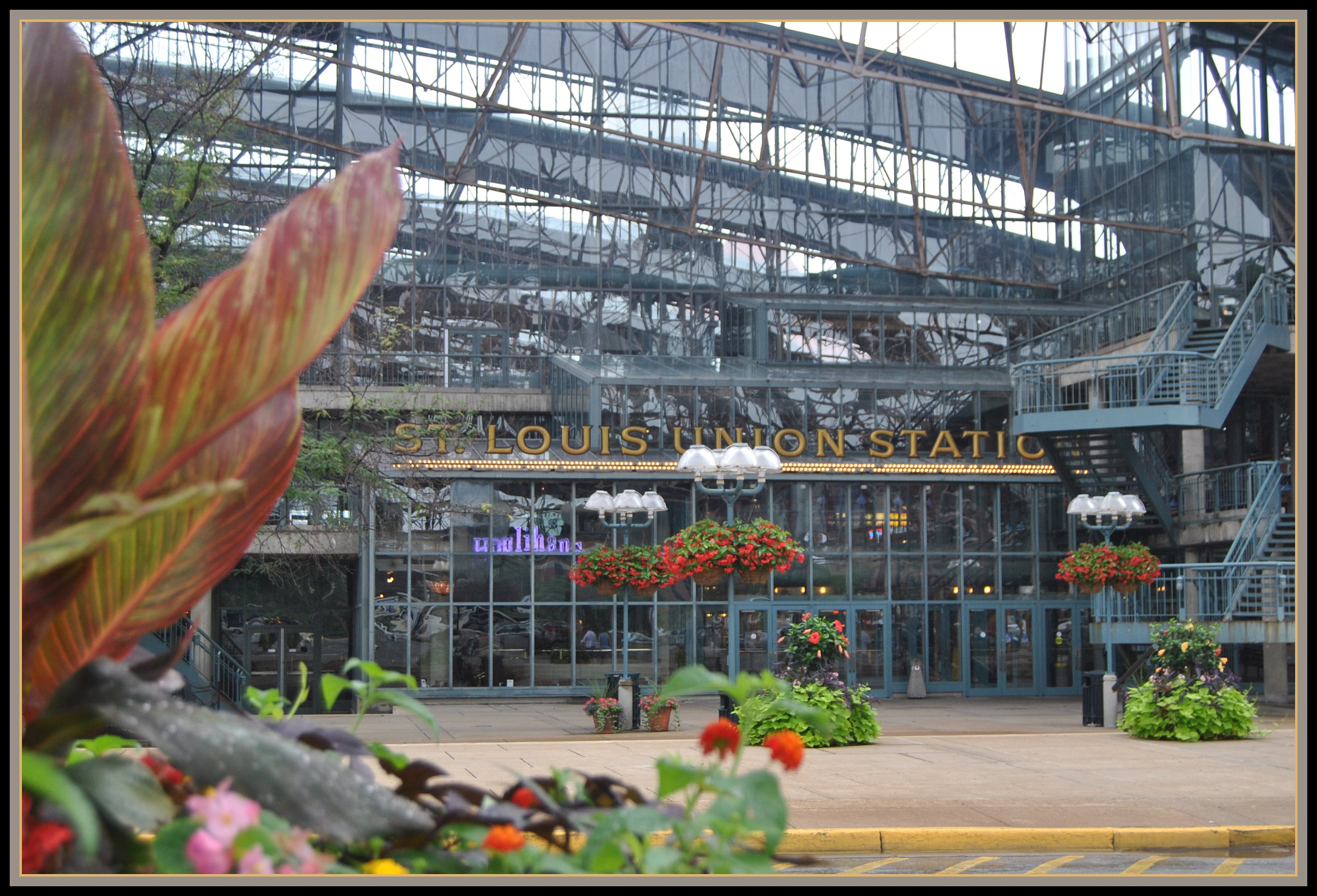
- The mall's main entrance (July 2011)

General information
- Status: Defunct; now operating as an aquarium
- Type: Festival marketplace (1985–1990); Shopping mall (1990–2016)

Website
- www.stlouisunionstation.com at the Wayback Machine (March 2007 archive)

St. Louis Union Station Hotel, Curio Collection by Hilton
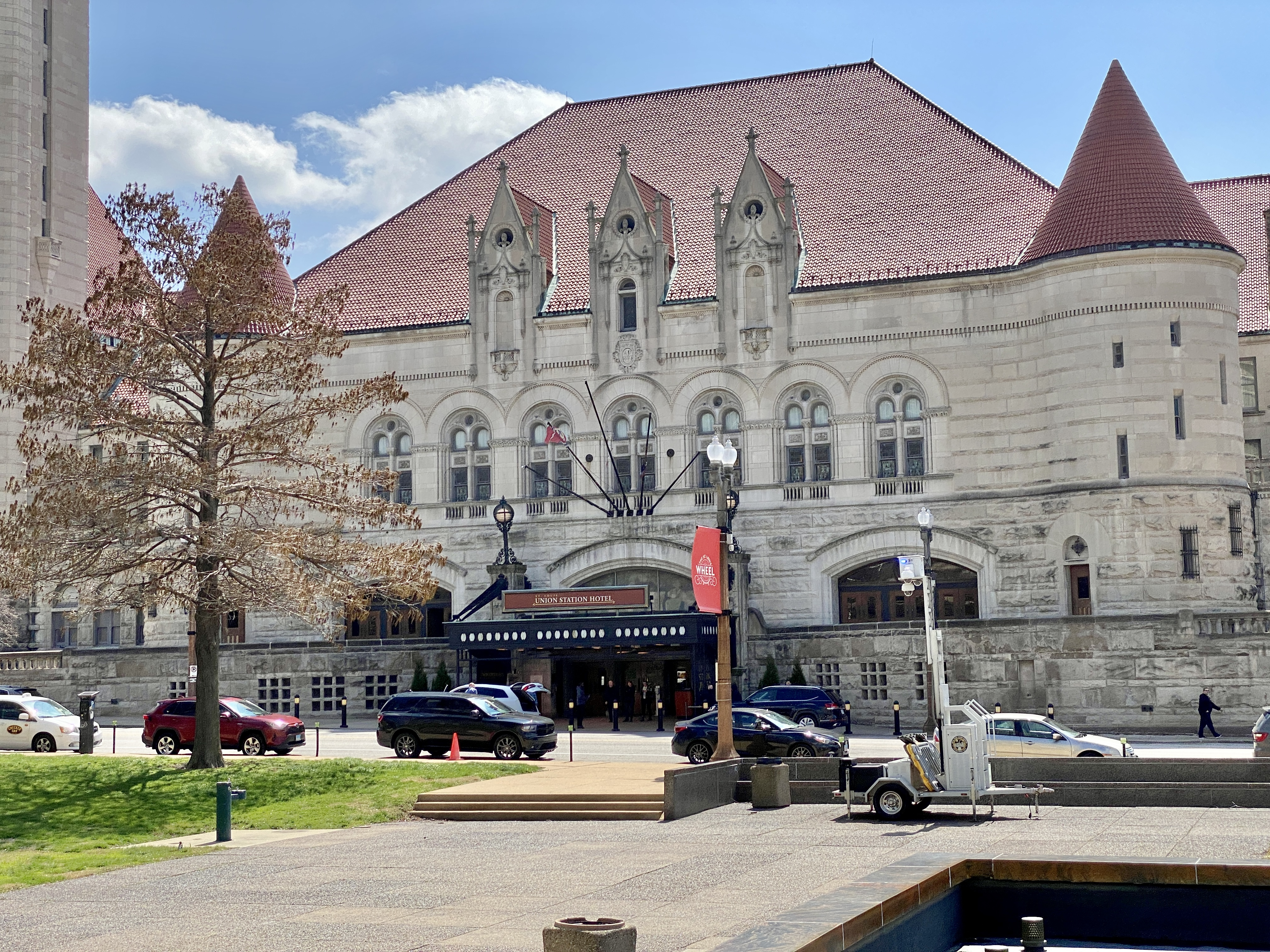
- Main entrance to the hotel (March 2023)
- Former names: Omni International Hotel St. Louis (1985–early 1990s); Hyatt Recency St. Louis (early 1990s – 2010); St. Louis Marriott Hotel (2010–2012); DoubleTree by Hilton St. Louis (2012–2016)

General information
- Status: Completed
- Type: Hotel
- Location: St. Louis, Missouri, U.S., 1820 Market Street, 63103
- Opening: August 29, 1985; 41 years ago
- Owner: Lodging Hospitality Management
- Operator: Lodging Hospitality Management

Technical details
- Floor count: 6

Design and construction
- Architect: HOK Group
- Developer: The Rouse Company

Other information
- Number of rooms: 567
- Number of suites: 24
- Parking: Paid parking

The St. Louis Union Station Mall (Note: The exact name of the mall is frequently debated. Some sources refer to the facility as "The Shops at Union Station". Others refer it as "The Mall at Union Station".) was a festival marketplace in Downtown St. Louis, Missouri, United States, which was developed inside St. Louis Union Station as part of a 1980s redevelopment by the Rouse Company. It was the last festival marketplace James W. Rouse had any involvement on with the main Rouse Company before he officially stepped down as Chairman of the Board in May 1984, focusing on his Enterprise Foundation subsidiary.

The St. Louis Union Station Hotel, Curio Collection by Hilton was also developed by the Rouse Company as part of the major renovation and reconstruction of the former train station, originally opening simultaneously with the mall under the Omni Hotels & Resorts brand. As of September 2016, the hotel remains operational, but as of December 2019, the mall has been completely gutted and transformed into an aquarium due to major vacancies and a sharp decline in traffic, which led to its closure in February 2016; furthermore, the shopping center was unprofitable.

==== 1978–1985: Development and opening ====
Following Union Station's closure as a rail terminal in 1978, The Rouse Company of Columbia, Maryland, and General Partner Steve Miller of the New York-based investment firm Oppenheimer Gateway Properties were selected and interested, respectively, to redevelop the area into a shopping center. Rouse formed the subsidiary St. Louis Union Station Beergarten, Inc. for development of the mall, Rouse Missouri Management Corporation for the facility's day-to-day operations, and hired HOK to design the Union Station Mall, and the building officially reopened as a festival marketplace on August 29, 1985, with a 539-room hotel known as St. Louis Union Station Hotel, a shopping mall (including a concourse known as Midway Shops), restaurants, and the Picnic Express, a food court. Original tenants included the Disney Store, The Fudgery, Banana Republic, Landry's Seafood House, and Talbots. Federal historic rehabilitation tax credits were used to transform Union Station into one of the city's most visited attractions. The station rehabilitation by Conrad Schmitt Studios remains one of the largest adaptive reuse projects in the United States. The hotel is housed in the headhouse and part of the train shed, which also houses a lake and shopping, entertainment and dining establishments. Omni Hotels was the original hotel operator, followed by the Hyatt Regency Hotel chain and Marriott Hotels.

==== 1990s: Decline ====
Weeks prior to when the mall opened, St. Louis Centre, the largest urban shopping mall in the U.S., had its grand opening on August 8, 1985, initially operated by Simon Property Group. Despite its initial success in the mid and late 1980s, Union Station Mall quickly suffered from high maintenance costs due to the massive size of the former train station. Additionally, in the 1990s, for financial reasons, The Rouse Company began shifting from local vendors to national chains across all of its marketplaces, including Union Station, leading to the opening of Hooters, but doing that only made the mall's problems even worse, as it gave shoppers little to no reason to visit Union Station Mall with paid parking rather than going to malls with similar options but with advantages they found were superior, such as the Saint Louis Galleria, which does not have paid parking, essentially making Union Station Mall a tourist trap.

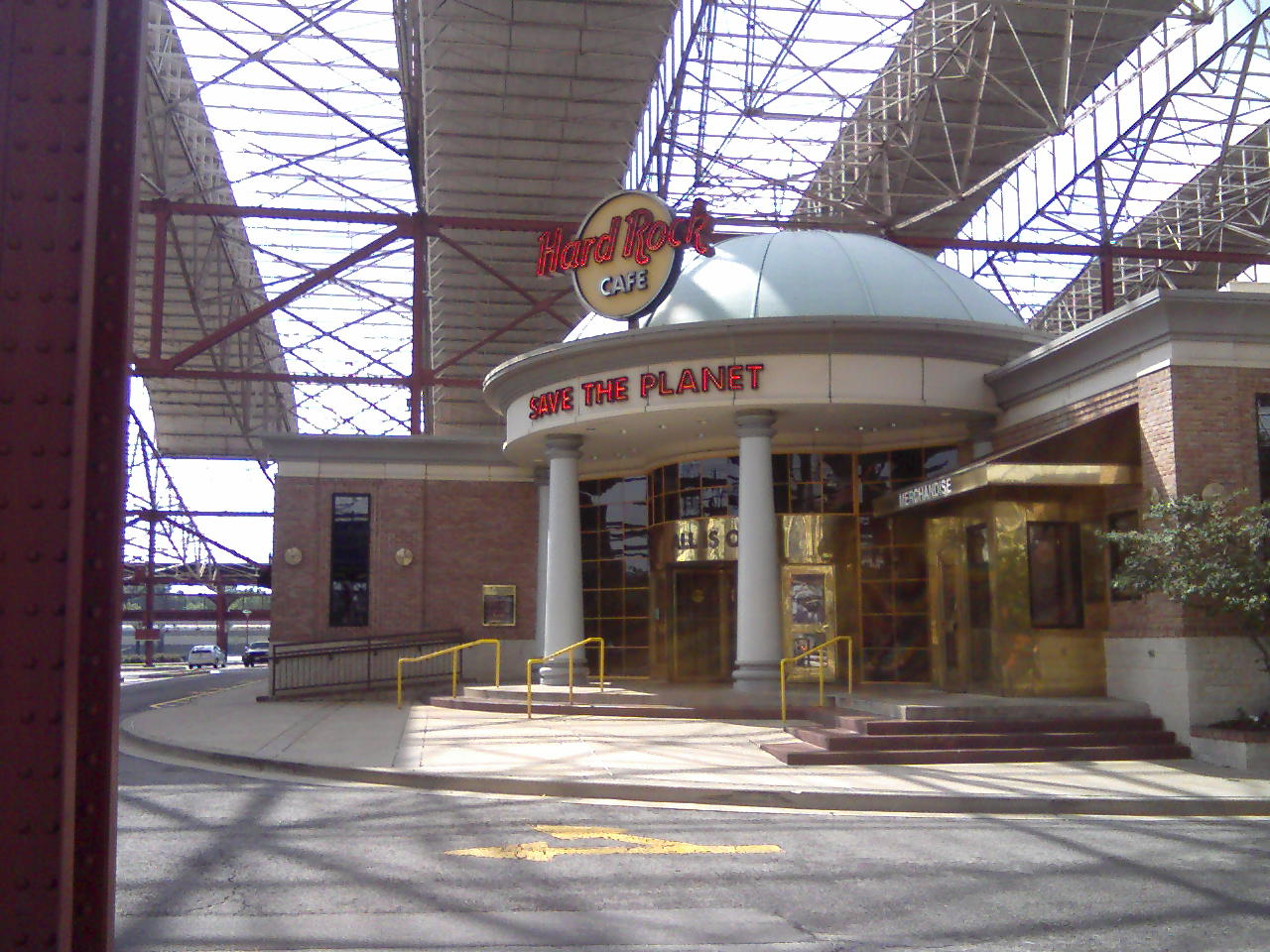
Hard Rock Cafe (May 26, 2010)

St. Louis Station Associates sold the property in 1998. The Rouse Company announced in the summer of that year that Hard Rock Cafe would open on the first floor of the St. Louis Union Station Mall in August as a revitalization effort. The restaurant had its grand opening on August 24, 1998. The Riverfront Times stated that Union Station Mall had experienced a "slow, painful death." Declining foot traffic and competition from suburban shopping centers also played a role in Union Station Mall's gradual failure, as despite its promotion as a tourist attraction, its only visitors were office workers stopping by to have lunch at the food court.

=== 21st century ===
==== Decline (continued) ====
The Rouse Company sold the mall and hotel portion of Union Station around October 1999, along with many other underperforming properties, to focus on its shift towards open-air shopping centers, amid ongoing vacancies and high operating costs. St. Louis Union Station was put into foreclosure by an Illinois bank in March 2003 because the new owners could not pay their mortgage. Union Station Mall was largely empty by 2005 during ongoing bankruptcy-related issues for the property's owners. Competition from the November 2003 opening and early success of St. Louis Mills in Hazelwood further harmed the mall's daily foot traffic. However, the Union Station Hotel continued operations in a healthy state.

In 2005, Michael J. Kelly of Chicago bought Union Station for $105 million. However, financial problems occurred in 2008, and the station remained untouched. Union Station Mall was losing $1 million annually and was soon owed back taxes by its holding company. Following these problems, Bob O'Loughlin was called for redevelopment. He stated, "The place needs a lot of fix-up."

==== 2010s: Redevelopment as St. Louis Aquarium at Union Station ====
St. Louis Aquarium at Union Station
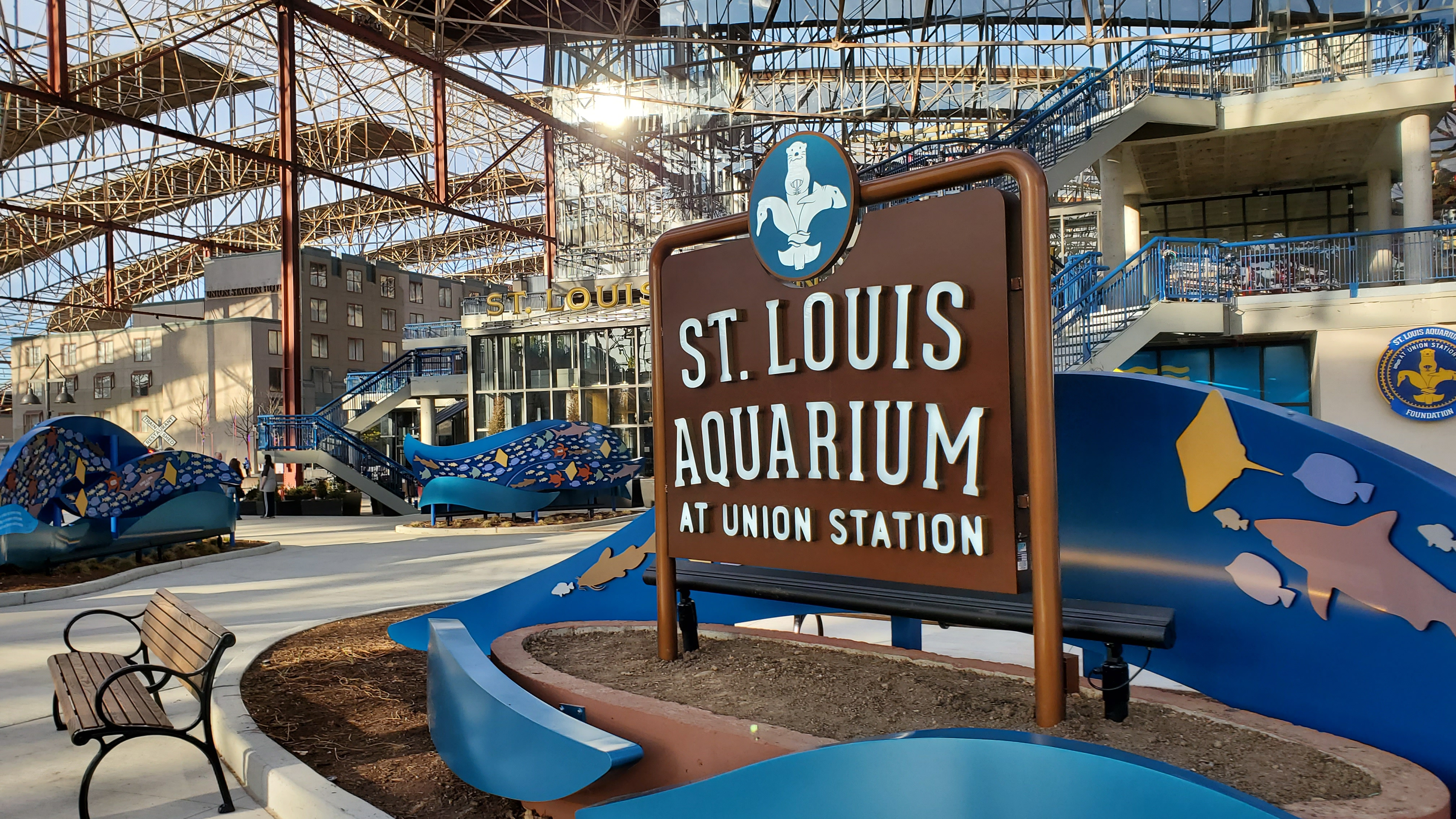
- Entrance South Trainshed (January 2020)
- Interactive map of St. Louis Aquarium at Union Station
- 38°37′41″N 90°12′05″W
- Date opened: December 25, 2019; 6 years ago
- Location: St. Louis, Missouri, U.S., 201 S. 18th Street
- Land area: 120,000 sq ft (11,000 m^{2})
- No. of animals: 13,000+
- No. of species: 250+
- Major exhibits: Shark Canyon, River's Edge, Deep Sea, The Confluence
- Owner: Lodging Hospitality Management
- Website: stlouisaquarium.com

The St. Louis Aquarium at Union Station is an aquarium inside the St. Louis Union Station in Downtown St. Louis, Missouri, replacing the original shopping mall inside the complex, which struggled from high vacancies and low foot traffic.

==== 2010–2019: Development and opening ====
In 2010 to 2011, the station's Marriott Hotel in the main terminal building was expanded. It took over the station's Midway area; the majority of Union Station Mall's stores were relocated to the train shed shopping arcade. In 2012, Lodging Hospitality Management (LHM) bought Union Station and rebranded the hotel as a DoubleTree.

On January 11, 2016, LHM announced that St. Louis Union Station would be redeveloped, converting vacant storefronts on the upper floors into 48 locomotive-themed hotel rooms to expand the existing hotel. The remains of the mall would be converted into a family entertainment center; building on the success of the Grand Hall's indoor projection shows, the announcement detailed a new outdoor Fire & Light Show at the lake, featuring synchronized fountains, fire bursts, a cantilevered net hammock space over the water, and 3D projection mapping across the historic hotel facade. 75,000 square feet (7,000 m^{2}) of indoor mall space would be cleared out for a secret, blockbuster family attraction.

The mall's interior closed to the public on February 1, 2016 to allow for construction, with the last remaining tenants not in the cleared out areas to only have public access within exterior entrances. On August 9, 2016, Lodging Hospitality Management revealed plans to redevelop the largely vacant mall into a $45 million, 120,000-square-foot (11,000 m^{2}) aquarium. The Memories Museum features artifacts and displays about the history of St. Louis Union Station and rail travel in the United States. A groundbreaking ceremony was held on November 2, 2017, where officials announced that construction would commence by the end of Thanksgiving of that year, and an opening date would be expected to happen in the summer of 2019.

Located on the upper level of the train shed, the museum is a joint project of Union Station Associates and the National Museum of Transportation. The original architectural drawings and blueprints for Union Station and the original hotel are available to researchers at the Washington University Archives at Washington University in St. Louis. Some architectural elements from the building have been removed in renovations and taken to the Sauget, Illinois, storage site of the National Building Arts Center.

St. Louis Union Station was the venue for the FIRST Tech Challenge World Championship component of the FIRST Championship, hosted in St. Louis every April until 2017, after which it was moved to Detroit. The station's train shed area features the St. Louis Wheel, a 200 ft (61 m) high, 42 gondola observation wheel. Inside the station is the St. Louis Rope Course, a 90,000 cubic feet (2,500 m^{3}), 3-story indoor ropes and zip line course. Union Station has two light show features: one in the train shed area, and another inside Union Station Hotel's lobby. Hard Rock Cafe closed permanently on August 16, 2018, as the parent company, Hard Rock International, announced the closure on June 19, 2018, stating, "We are exploring other opportunities in St. Louis and hope to re-enter the market when we can identify the right new location." However, as of January 2019, St. Louis remains without a new Hard Rock.

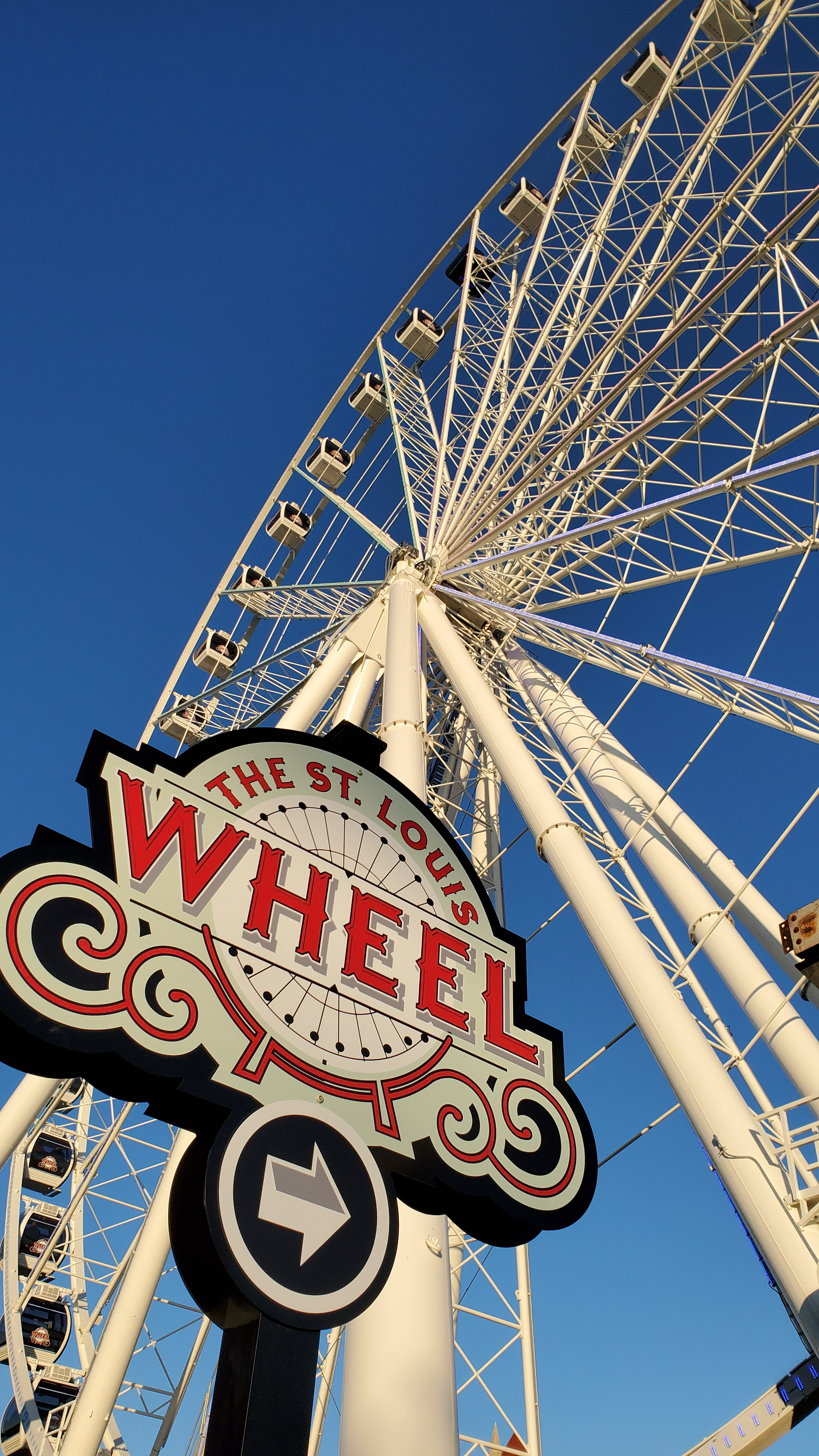
The St. Louis Wheel at Union Station

LHM spent $5 million to $8 million to renovate the former Hard Rock space. It was announced to be replaced by the St. Louis Union Station Soda Fountain, a retro-style candy emporium and ice cream parlor designed to align with the new family-friendly branding of the complex. It was slated to open in the summer of 2019.

Besides the aquarium, LHM also planned to include a 200-foot Ferris wheel outside of Union Station. The $45 million St. Louis Aquarium was later scheduled to open in the fall of 2019. In January 2020, Build-A-Bear Workshop moved their global headquarters to downtown St. Louis inside the 68,000 ft (21,000 m) Grand Central Building inside the Union Station complex. The company also opened their new Build-A-Bear Workshop Union Station headquarters store and also operates a Build-A-Bear Radio studio and other experiential elements at their new headquarters. Additionally, a Ferris wheel, aquarium, and an abundance of restaurants have been added to Union Station in 2020.

On December 25, 2019 (Christmas Day), the St. Louis Aquarium at Union Station had its grand opening in the former mall area, attracting over 60,000 attending visitors within its very first week. The Fudgery and Landry's Seafood House returned to the new complex, alongside a new tenant known as 1894 Cafe, named after when St. Louis Union Station was originally built and designed by Lawrence Group and Alex Duenwald, blending bright colors with artistic patterns to also commemorate the 1904 World's Fair. At 120,000 sq ft (11,000 m^{2}), the aquarium is home to more than 13,000 animals representing over 250 species.

==== 2020s–present: Tourist attraction ====
Announced in August 2025, LHM would invest in $15 million to add three amusement rides at the complex's outdoor Wheel Park, being Loco Motion, a 22-foot-tall, train-themed mini spinning family roller coaster built by Zamperla, Flying Louie, a large, 42-seat pirate ship ride that swings riders in an arc reaching 42.5 feet high while offering views of the downtown skyline, and the Wave Swinger, a classic spinning swing ride that lifts guests 25 feet into the air, uniquely decorated to pay homage to the 1904 World's Fair.

== Transportation ==
=== MetroLink ===
MetroLink, the St. Louis region's light rail system, serves Union Station via the Red and Blue lines. The station is located beneath the train shed in the historic Union Station Baggage Tunnel. This tunnel was originally constructed in the 1890s as a below grade transfer area for baggage between trains. It was converted and opened for MetroLink usage in 1993 and has seen several renovations over the years, most notably in 2010 and 2016. The tunnel is expected to see another major renovation in 2025.

It takes about 30 minutes to travel to either terminal at St. Louis Lambert International Airport via the Red Line.

=== Gateway Transportation Station ===
The city's major transportation hub, Gateway Multimodal Transportation Center, is located two blocks from Union Station. It also serves MetroLink in addition to local buses and national connections with Amtrak, Greyhound and other services.

=== Taxi and rideshare ===
St. Louis Union Station has 24-hour taxi service at its north entrance on Market Street.

== Filming ==
In 1981, areas of the then disused station were used in the filming of John Carpenter's movie Escape from New York. A scene involving the captured President was shot in the station's train shed and the film's gladiatorial fight was staged in the Grand Hall.

== Gallery ==
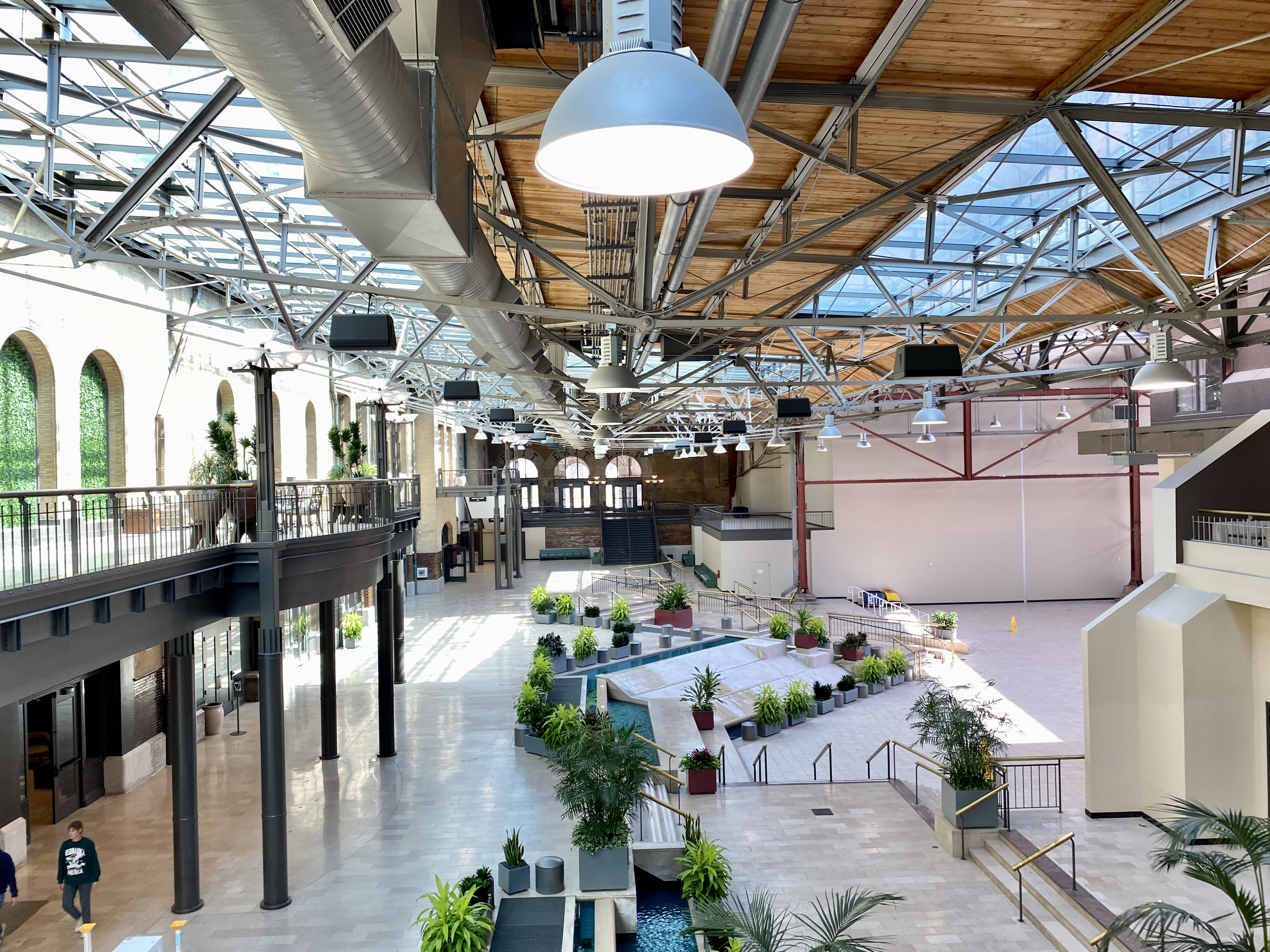

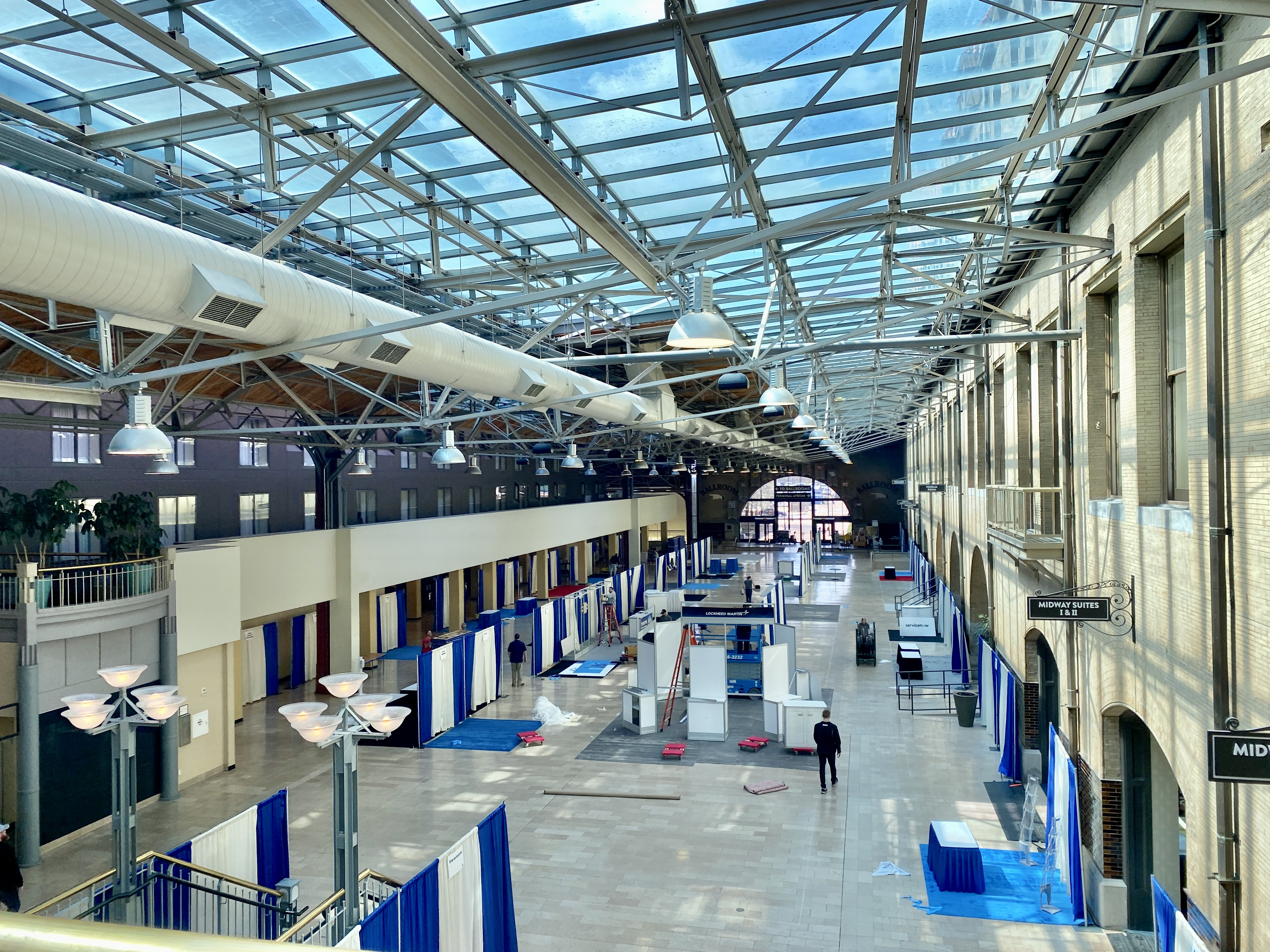
The Midway (March 2023)

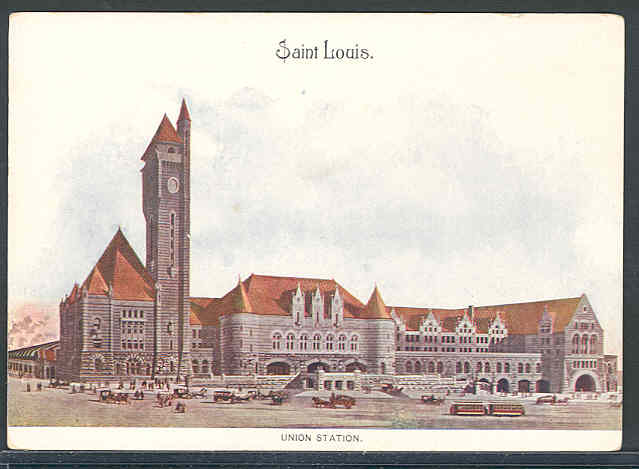
Union Station postcard from about 1909

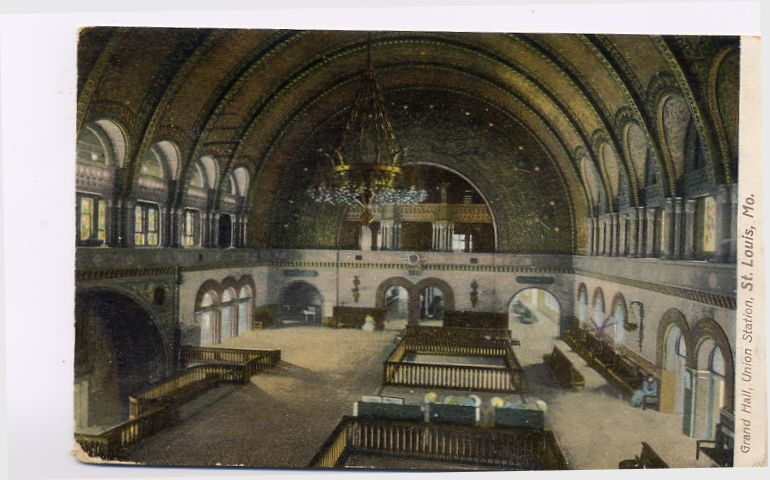
Grand Hall, postmarked 1909

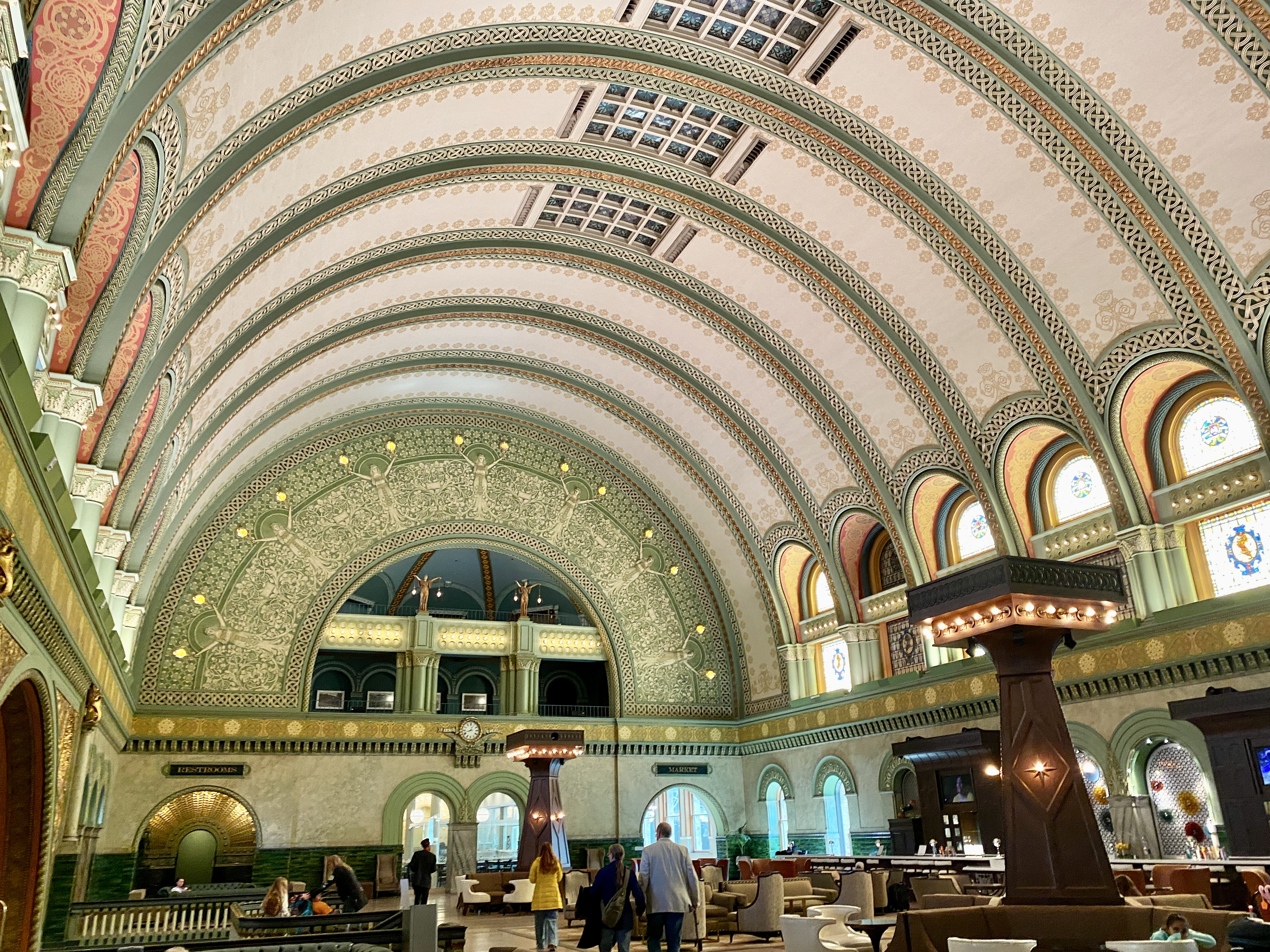
Grand Hall in March 2023

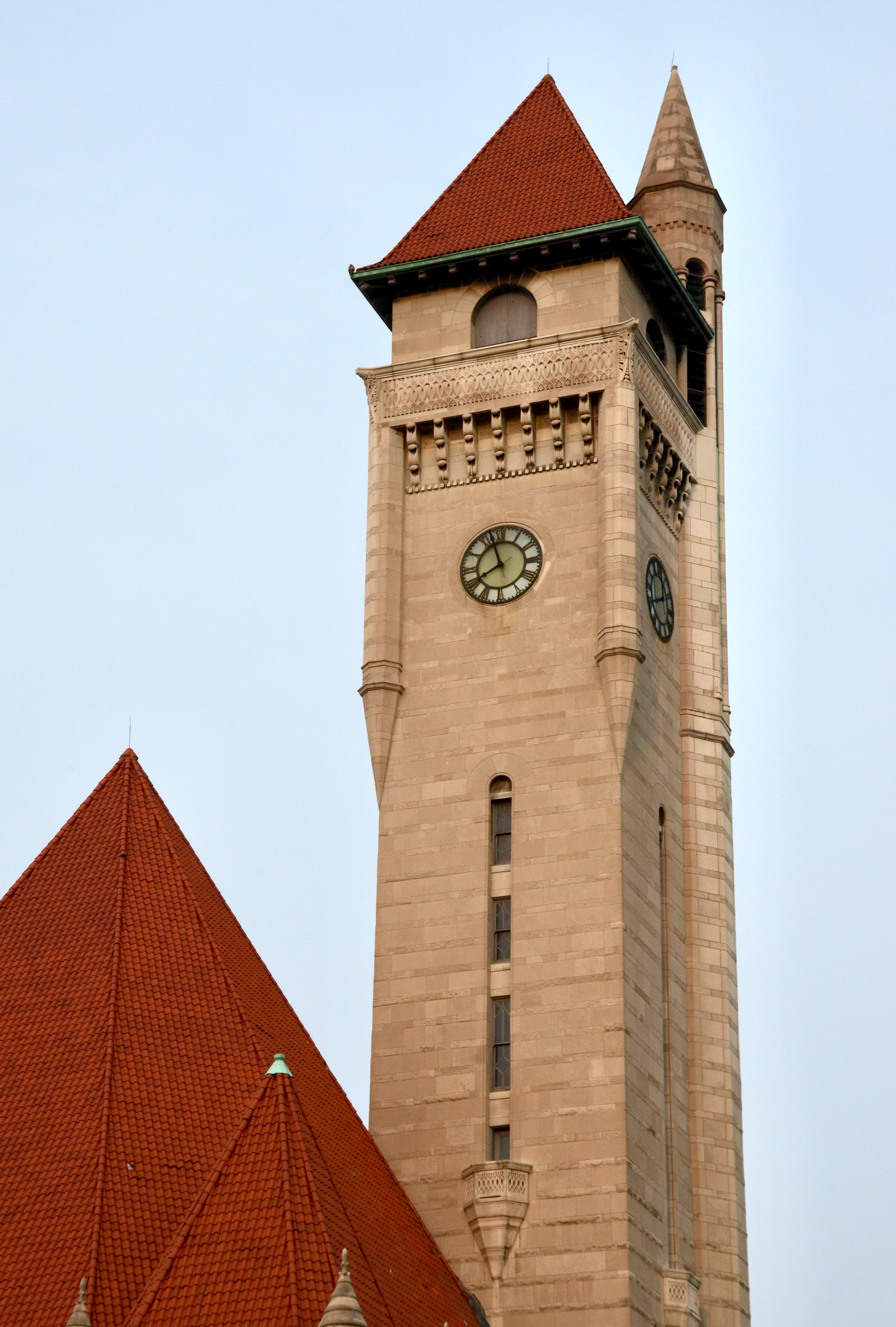
The building's clock tower, from the northeast

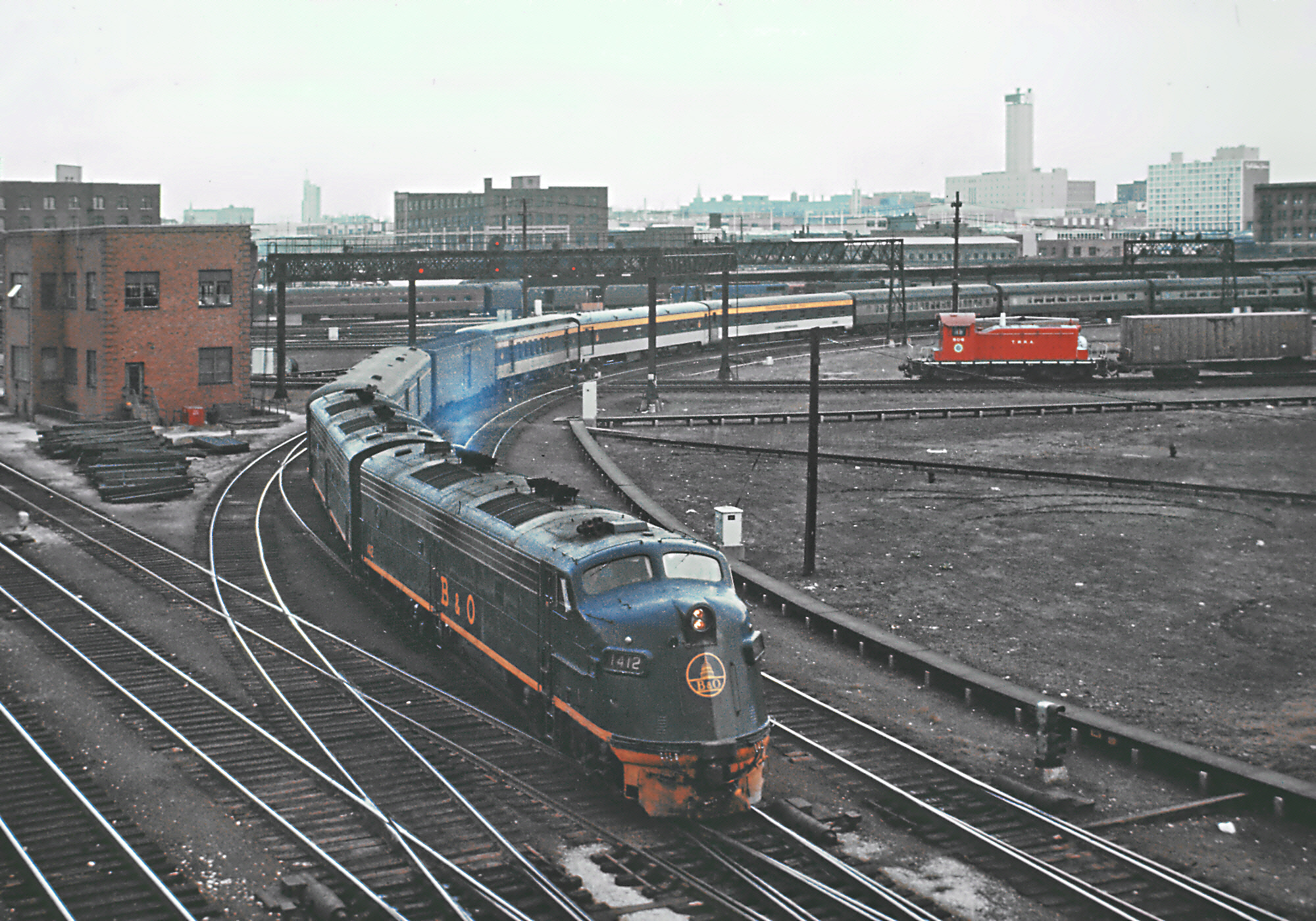
George Washington leaving St. Louis Union Station, 1967

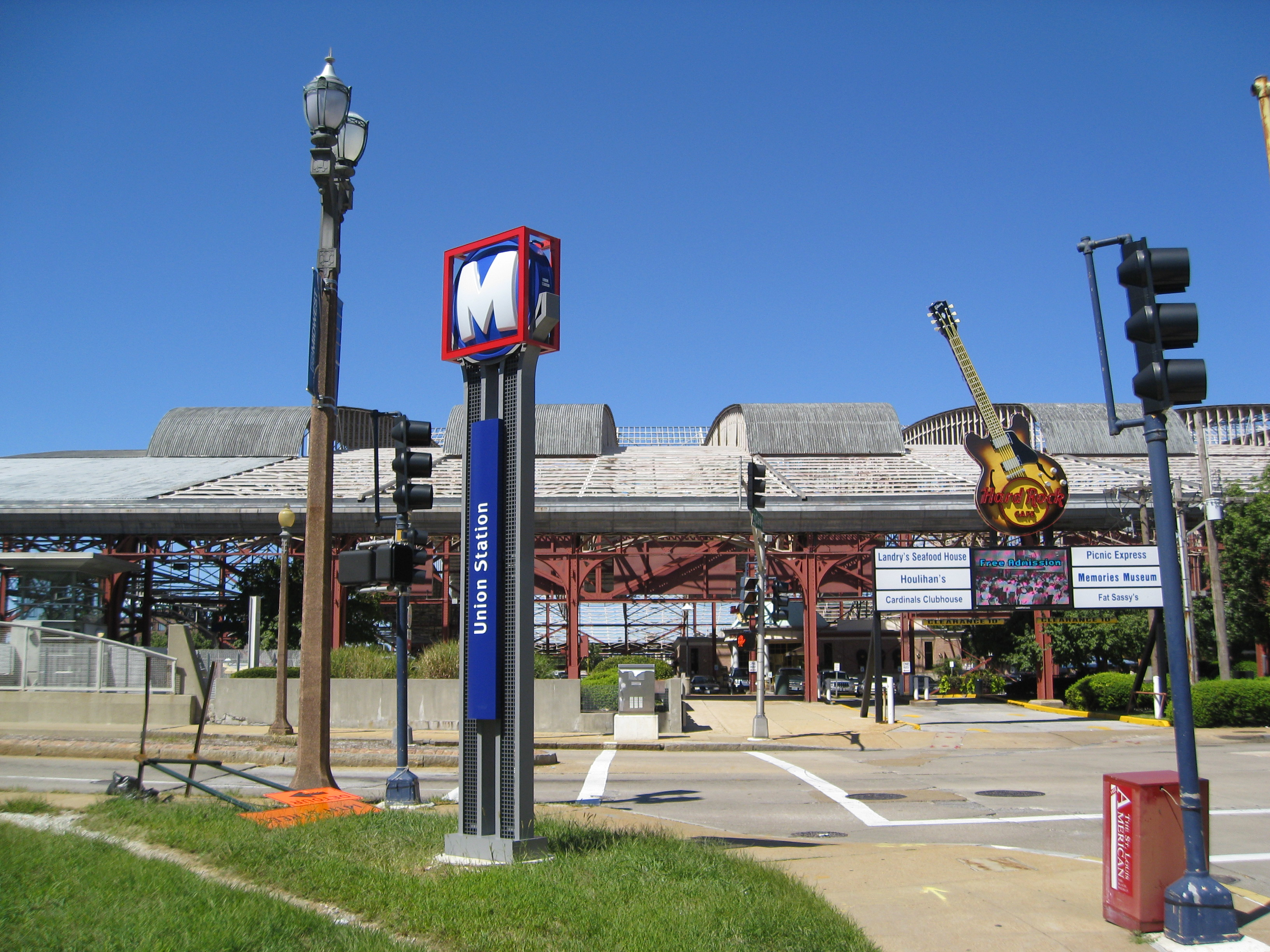
MetroLink monument sign and the entrance to Hard Rock Cafe (September 2010)

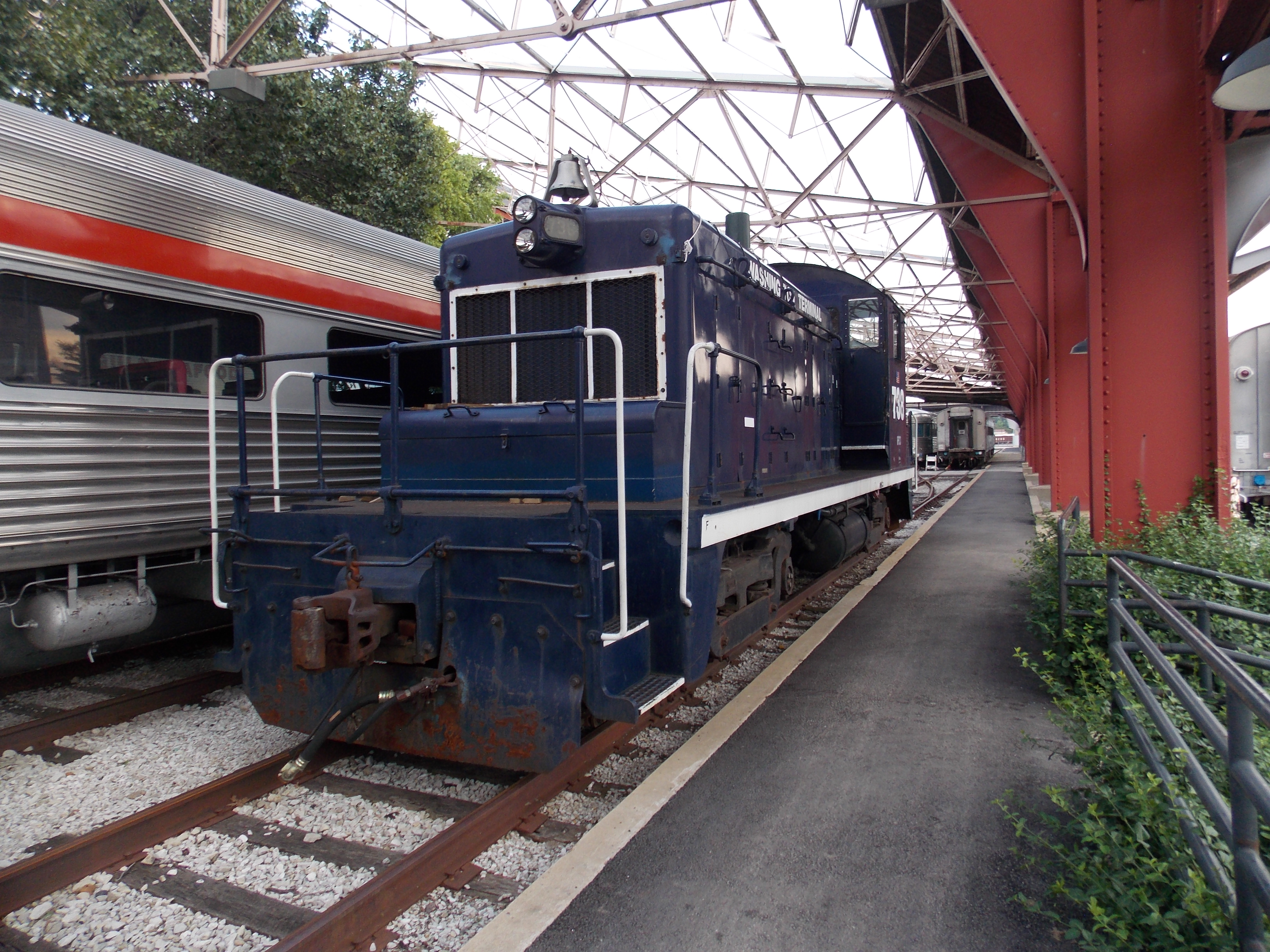
Former Washington Terminal EMD SW1 Locomotive at St. Louis Union Station. July 2015.

== See also ==
- List of railway stations
