= Union Station (MetroLink) =

Light rail station in St. Louis, Missouri, US

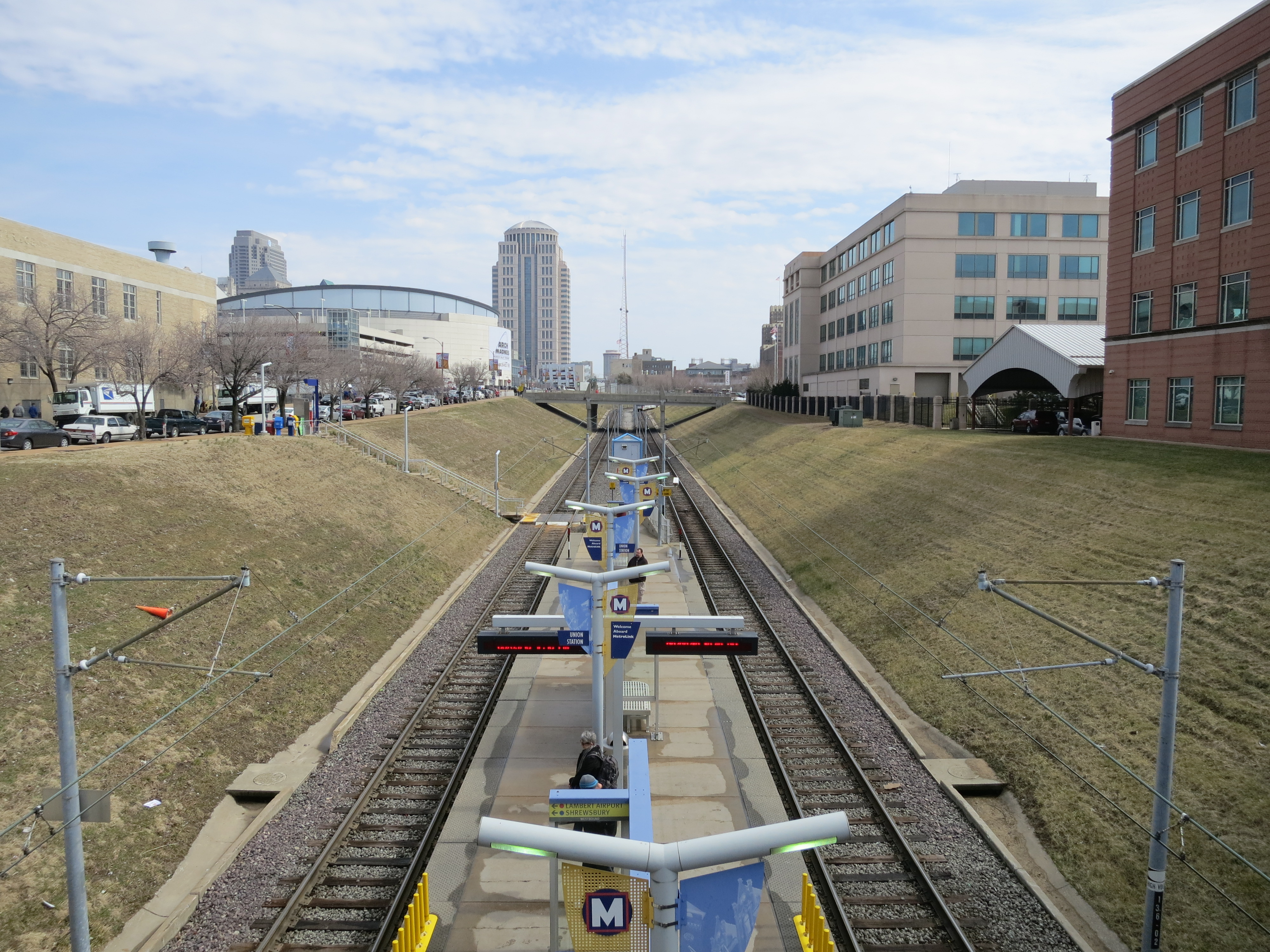
- Union Station platform

General information
- Location: 300 South 18th Street; St. Louis, Missouri
- Coordinates: 38.626621°N 90.206846°W
- Owner: Bi-State Development
- Operator: Metro Transit
- Platforms: 1 island platform
- Tracks: 2
- Connections: MetroBus Missouri: 11

Construction
- Structure type: Below-grade
- Accessible: Yes

History
- Opened: July 31, 1993

Passengers
- 2018: 1,142 daily
- Rank: 14 out of 38

Services
| Preceding station | MetroLink | Following station |
|---|---|---|
| Grand toward Shrewsbury–Lansdowne I-44 | Blue Line | Civic Center toward Fairview Heights |
| Grand toward Lambert Airport Terminal 1 | Red Line | Civic Center toward Shiloh–Scott |
Location

Union Station is a light rail station on the Red and Blue lines of the St. Louis MetroLink system. This below-grade station is located partially within the former baggage tunnel beneath historic St. Louis Union Station near 18th Street at its intersection with Clark Avenue.

== Station layout ==
The station is located at the east portal of the Union Station Tunnel. Its platform is accessed via an elevator and staircase from the west within the Union Station train shed and a staircase on the north embankment.

== Public artwork ==
In 2013, Metro's Arts in Transit program commissioned the work Spring Forth by Jim Gallucci for this station. The stainless steel sculpture depicts fantastical plant forms that leap and arch from the grassy embankment, celebrating the vitality that the MetroLink system brings to the St. Louis area.

== Notable places nearby ==
- Brickline Greenway
- Energizer Park, home of St. Louis City SC
- Enterprise Center, home of the St. Louis Blues
- Gateway Mall
- St. Louis Union Station, home of the St. Louis Aquarium
- Stifel Theatre
