= Grand station (MetroLink) =

Light rail station in St. Louis, Missouri, US

Grand
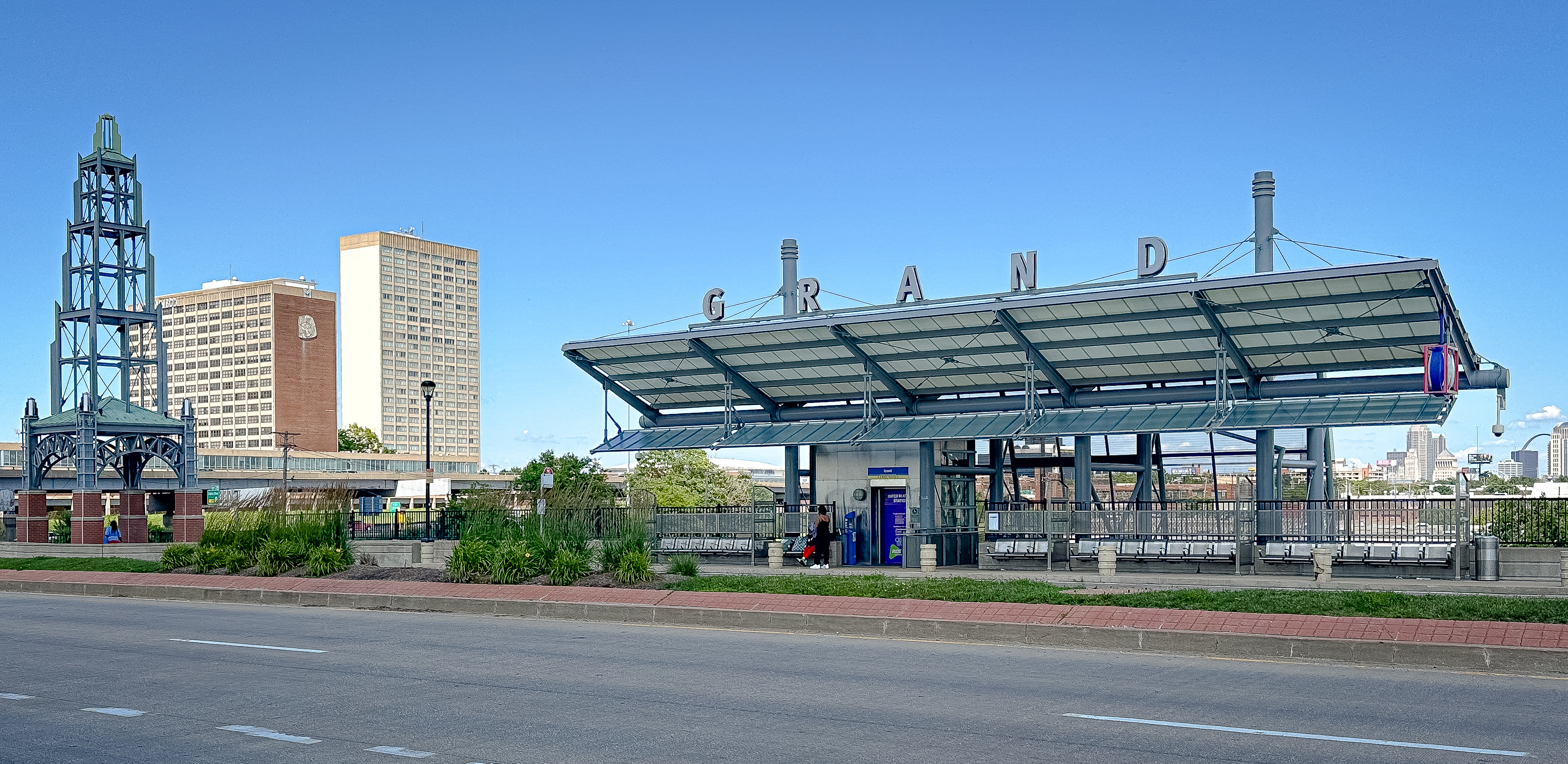
- Upper level of Grand station in 2025

General information
- Location: 3560 Scott Avenue; St. Louis, Missouri
- Coordinates: 38.629467°N 90.235272°W
- Owner: Bi-State Development
- Operator: Metro Transit
- Platforms: 1 island platform
- Tracks: 2
- Bus stands: 2
- Connections: MetroBus Missouri: 70

Construction
- Structure type: At-grade
- Parking: 60 spaces
- Cycle facilities: Racks
- Accessible: Yes

History
- Opened: July 31, 1993
- Rebuilt: 2012

Passengers
- 2018: 2,535 daily
- Rank: 4 out 38

Services
Preceding station	MetroLink	Following station
Cortex toward Shrewsbury–Lansdowne I-44	Blue Line	Union Station toward Fairview Heights
Cortex toward Lambert Airport Terminal 1	Red Line	Union Station toward Shiloh–Scott
Location

Grand station is a light rail station on the Red and Blue lines of the St. Louis MetroLink system. This at-grade station is situated beneath the Grand Boulevard viaduct and connects to the region's busiest bus line, the #70 Grand.

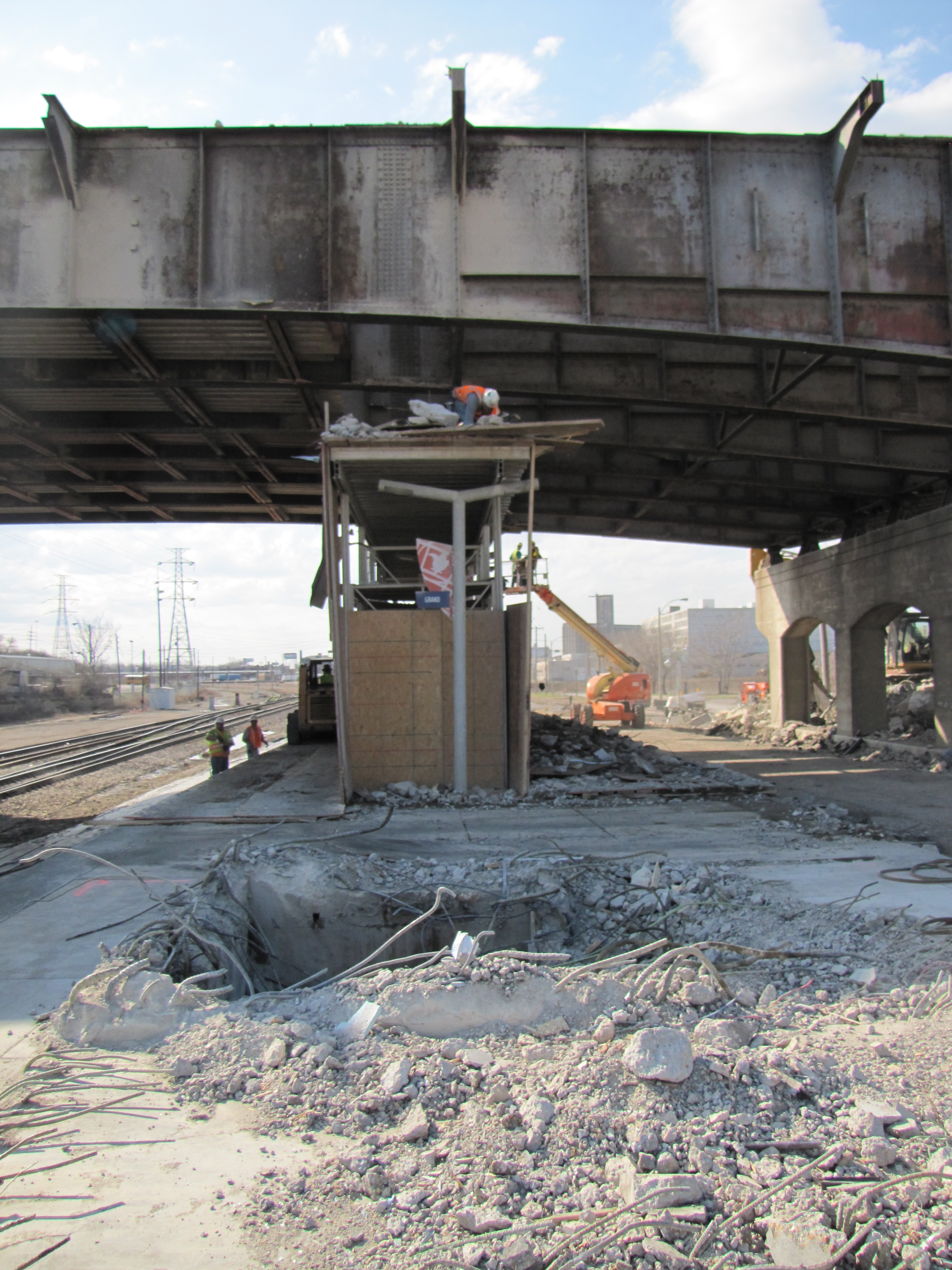
A former elevator shaft seen in 2011 during the viaduct demolition

In 2011, the station was temporarily closed to permit the demolition of the Grand Boulevard viaduct and the station's original 1993 elevator towers and stairs. A temporary station was employed while the bridge was replaced and a new MetroLink station was constructed. The new station and transfer center underneath the completed viaduct opened on August 20, 2012.

== Station layout ==
Grand is accessible by two elevators and sets of stairs that provide access to both northbound and southbound Grand Boulevard and a ramp on Scott Avenue.

== Public artwork ==
In 2012, Metro's Arts in Transit program commissioned the work Garden Under the Bridge by Barbara Grygutis for installation under the Grand Boulevard viaduct near the station. In the center of the transit plaza, two “seed pod forms” create a gateway to the station and illuminate the surrounding area with electric-blue light. LED lighting embedded in the pavers work in concert with this main sculpture.
