= Goldfarb School of Nursing at Barnes-Jewish College =

Private college in St. Louis, Missouri, US

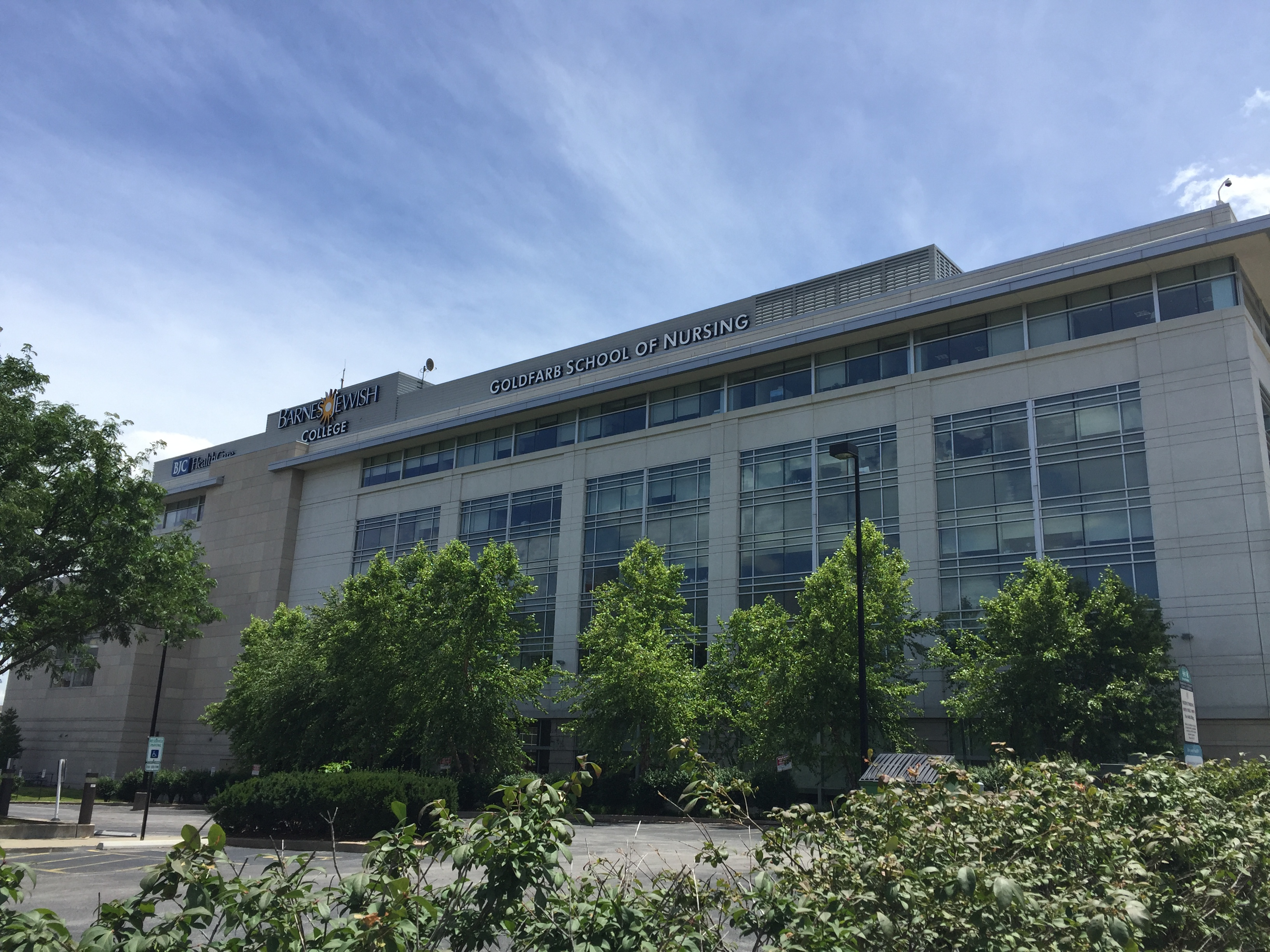
- Goldfarb School of Nursing in 2017
- Type: Nursing school
- Established: 1902
- Location: St. Louis, Missouri, US; 38.6372°N 90.2586°W
- Website: www.barnesjewishcollege.edu
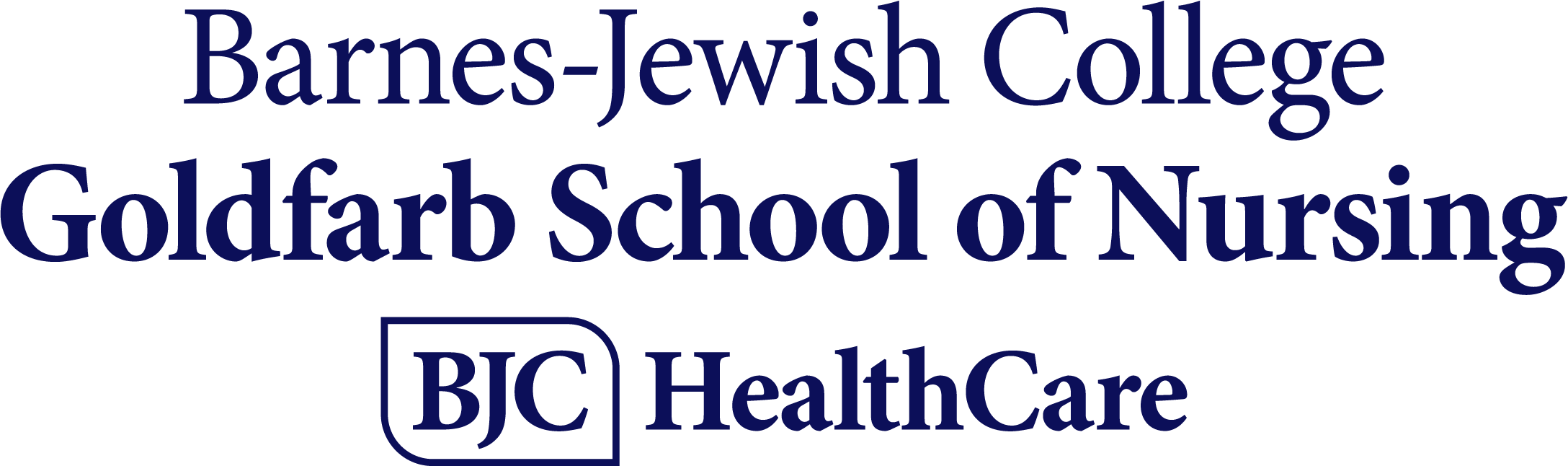

Barnes–Jewish College Goldfarb School of Nursing is a private nursing school in St. Louis. It is on the Washington University's Medical School and Barnes-Jewish Hospital campus.

== History ==
The college began with the founding of the Jewish Hospital School of Nursing in 1902. It was one of first nursing schools in the United States to be accredited by the National League for Nursing (NLN). In 1955, the Barnes Hospital School of Nursing was established following the dissolution of the nursing program at Washington University in St. Louis.

By the early 1990s, the Jewish Hospital School of Nursing was offering associate, bachelor's, and master's degrees. In 1995, the Barnes Hospital School of Nursing closed its independent operations, and the school was operated by the University of Missouri–St. Louis (UMSL) for a ten-year period as the Barnes College of Nursing at UMSL. In 2005, the Barnes name returned to the hospital system and merged with the Jewish Hospital program to form the Barnes-Jewish College of Nursing and Allied Health. Following a decision to focus exclusively on nursing, the allied health programs were phased out in May 2007, and the institution was renamed Barnes-Jewish College of Nursing.

In December 2007, philanthropist Alvin Goldfarb donated $5 million to the college, capping a $20 million fundraising campaign by the Foundation for Barnes-Jewish Hospital. In recognition of the donation, the institution was renamed the Goldfarb School of Nursing at Barnes-Jewish College. Half of the total funds raised, including a contribution from BJC HealthCare, financed the construction of Goldfarb Hall, a $40 million facility on the Washington University Medical Campus that opened in January 2008. The remaining funds were allocated to endow scholarships, professorships, research, and program development.

The college opened a second campus at Missouri Baptist Medical Center in January 2012; howerver, this campus was removed from the college's facilities list in 2023.

== Academics ==
Goldfarb has a nationally recognized educational facility with advanced technology in classrooms, lecture halls and simulation labs.

Goldfarb School of Nursing at Barnes-Jewish College partners with top health care and educational institutions within the BJC HealthCare system and beyond to support its mission of advancing learning and innovation within the healing profession.

The baccalaureate degree program in nursing/master's degree program in nursing/Doctor of Nursing Practice program/post-graduate APRN certificate program at school is accredited by the Commission on Collegiate Nursing Education.

Barnes Jewish College and the Goldfarb School of Nursing is fully accredited by the Higher Learning Commission of the North Central Association of Colleges and Schools (NCA). It also has approval from the Missouri Coordinator Board for Higher Education (MCBHE).

Degree programs include a Bachelor of Science in Nursing (BSN), Master of Science in Nursing (MSN), and Doctor of Nursing Practice (DNP). The college also offers a research-based Doctor of Philosophy (PhD) in Nursing Science.
