= Washington University Medical Campus =

Hospital in Missouri, United States

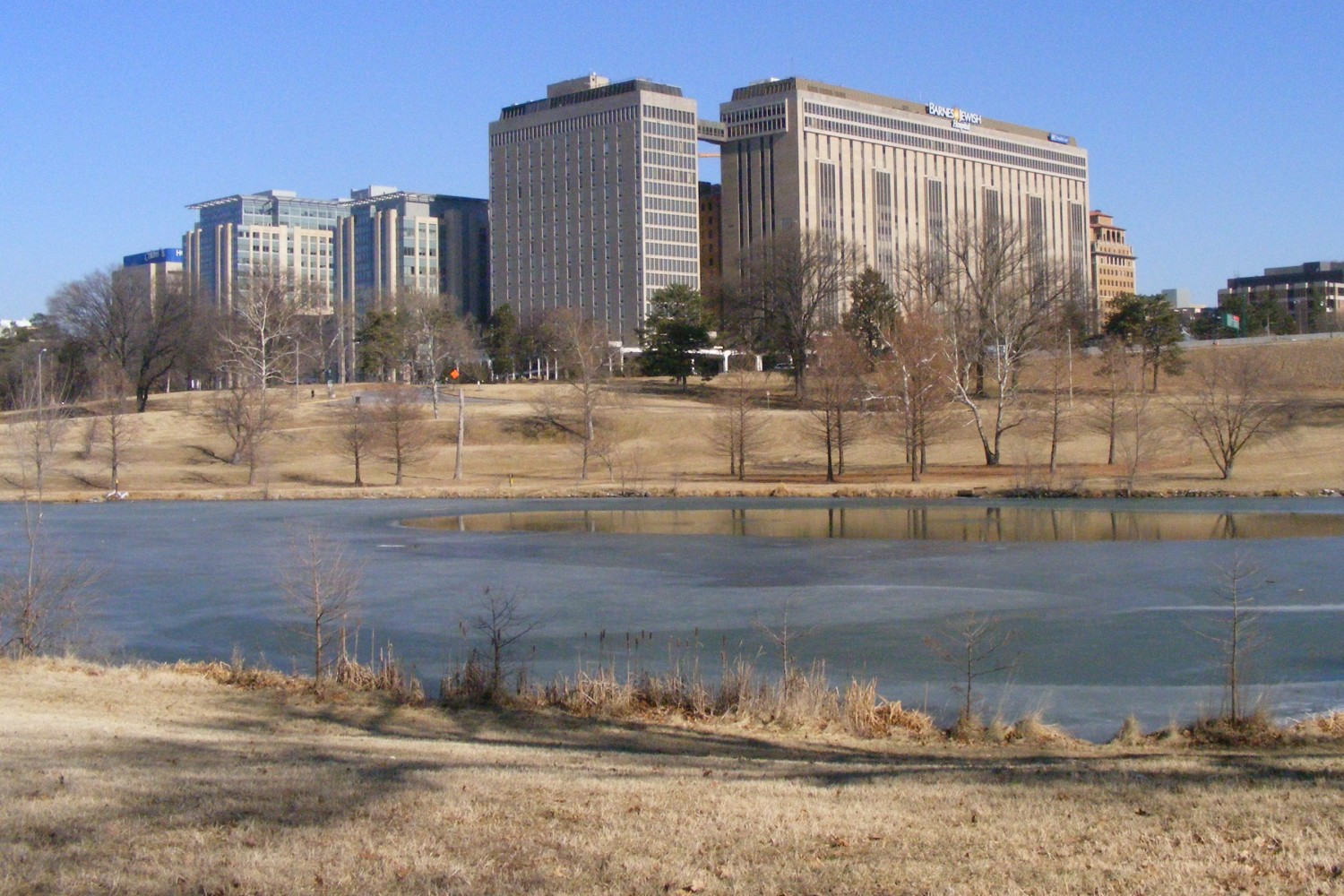
- Part of the Washington University Medical Campus as seen from Forest Park
- Type: Non-profit hospital center
- Established: 1962
- Location: St. Louis, Missouri, US; 38.637°N 90.265°W
- Campus: Urban; 230 acres
- Website: Official website

The Washington University Medical Campus (WUMC), located in St. Louis, Missouri, is a large scale health-care-focused commercial development located in the Central West End neighborhood of St Louis. The WUMC corporate partners are Barnes-Jewish Hospital, BJC HealthCare, St. Louis Children’s Hospital, and Washington University School of Medicine.

== History ==
The Washington University Medical Center was incorporated in 1962. The name changed from Washington University Medical Center to Washington University Medical Campus in 2017. The campus is located on over 230 acres (93 ha) directly to the east of Forest Park.

WUMC serves as the anchor of the Central West End community, a commercial and residential neighborhood with numerous shops, restaurants, and night spots. The Washington University Medical Center Redevelopment Corporation (WUMCRC) focuses on developing public-private partnerships that promote infrastructure and housing development in the WUMC area, including the Central West End and Forest Park Southeast neighborhoods. Brian Phillips has served as executive director of WUMCRC since 1996.

== Institutions ==
Many institutions of the Washington University Medical Campus are frequently ranked among the most prestigious and renowned healthcare providers in the United States. Institutions located on the Washington University Medical Campus include:

- Alvin J. Siteman Cancer Center at Barnes-Jewish Hospital and Washington University School of Medicine
- Barnes-Jewish Hospital
- Central Institute for the Deaf
- Goldfarb School of Nursing at Barnes-Jewish College
- St. Louis Children's Hospital
- The Rehabilitation Institute of St. Louis
- University of Health Sciences and Pharmacy in St. Louis (formerly St. Louis College of Pharmacy)
- Washington University School of Medicine

Other institutions located at the campus are:

- Shriners Hospital for Children - St Louis
