= Gay village =

Geographical area within a city that is inhabited or frequented by LGBTQ people

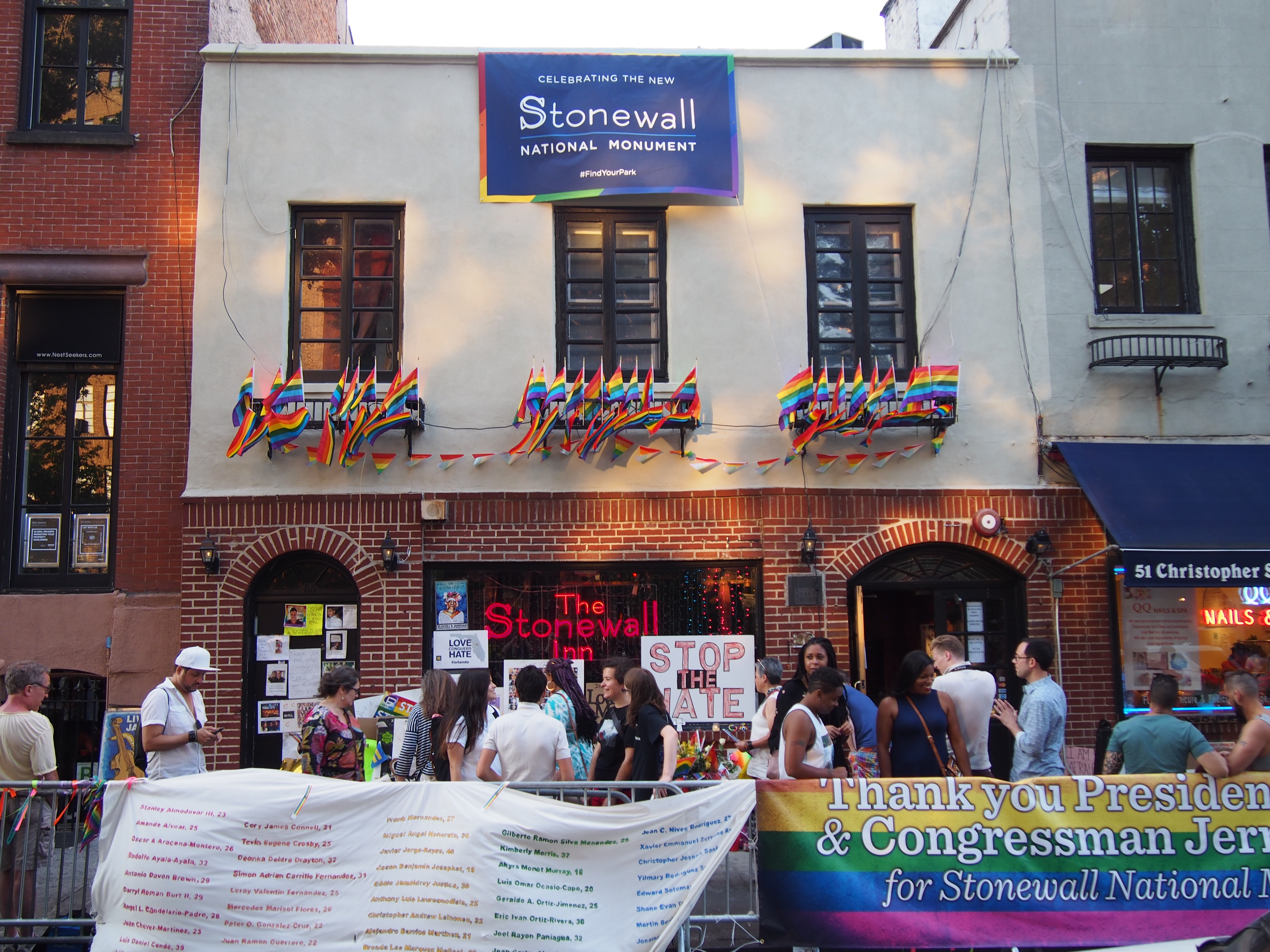
The Stonewall Inn is in the gay village of Greenwich Village, Manhattan.

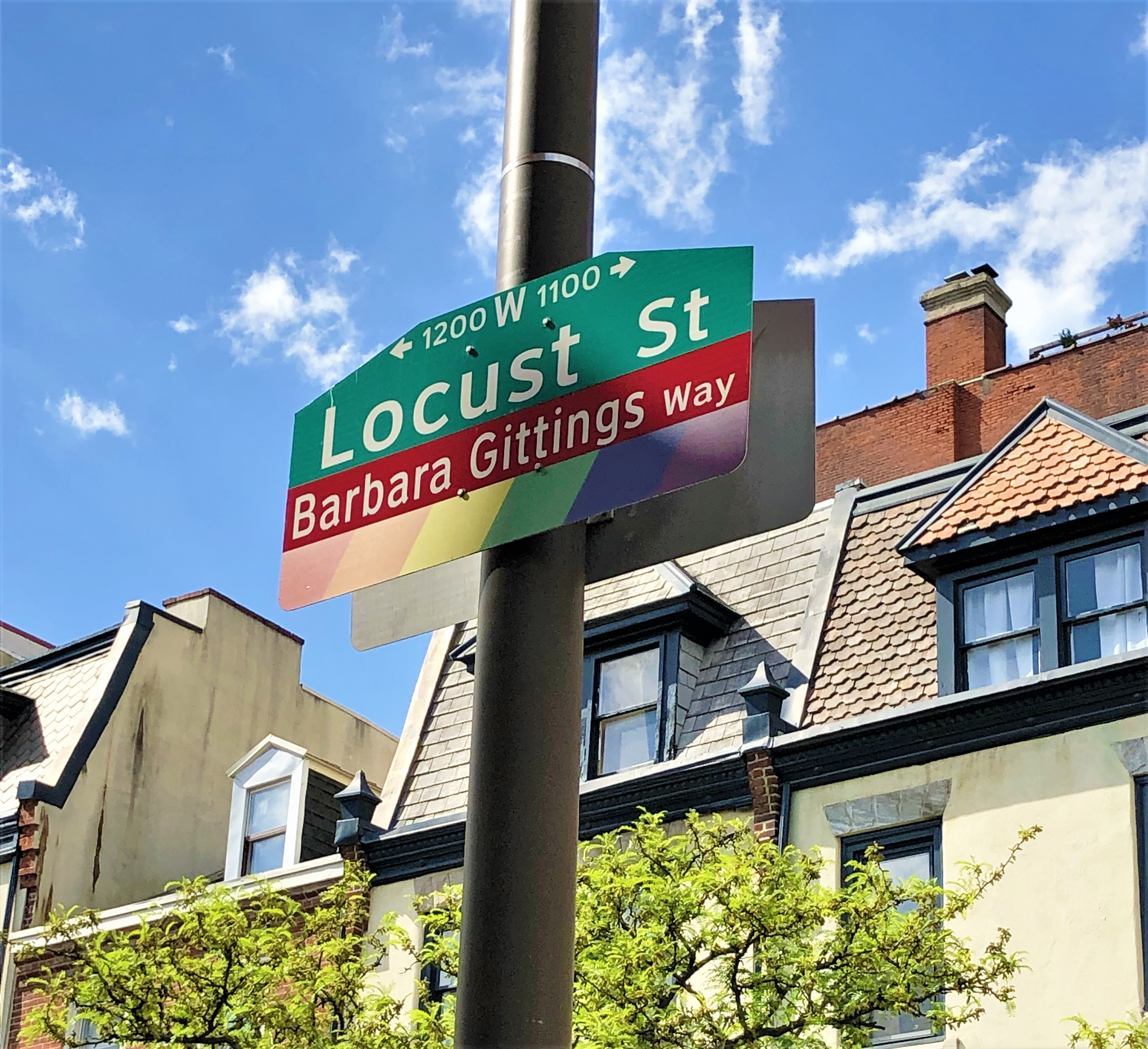
Barbara Gittings Way, Center City, Philadelphia

A gay village, also known as a gayborhood or gaybourhood, is a geographical area with generally recognized boundaries that is inhabited or frequented by many lesbian, gay, bisexual, transgender, and queer (LGBTQ) people. Gay villages often contain a number of gay-oriented establishments, such as gay bars and pubs, nightclubs, bathhouses, restaurants, boutiques, and bookstores.

Such areas may represent an LGBTQ-friendly oasis in an otherwise hostile city or may simply have a high concentration of gay residents and businesses. Some areas are often associated with being "gay" cities or resorts, due to their image and acceptance of the gay community.

Much as other urbanized groups, some LGBTQ people have managed to utilize their spaces as a way to reflect their cultural values and serve the special needs of individuals in relation to society at large. Today, these neighborhoods can typically be found in the upper-class areas of a given city, like in Manhattan, chosen for aesthetic or historic value, no longer resulting from the sociopolitical ostracization and the constant threat of physical violence from homophobic individuals that originally motivated these communities to live together for their mutual safety.

These neighborhoods are also often found in working-class parts of the city or in the neglected fringe of a downtown area – communities which may have been upscale historically but became economically depressed and socially disorganized. In these cases, the establishment of an LGBTQ community has turned some of these areas into more expensive neighborhoods, a process known as gentrification – a phenomenon in which LGBTQ people often play a pioneer role. This process does not always work out to the benefit of these communities, as they often see property values rise so high that they can no longer afford them, as high-rise condominiums are built and bars move out, or the only LGBTQ establishments that remain are those catering to a more upscale clientele. However, today's manifestations of "queer ghettos" bear little resemblance to those of the 1970s.

== The ghetto ==
The term ghetto originally referred to those places in European cities where Jews were required to live according to local law. During the 20th century, ghetto came to be used to describe the areas inhabited by a variety of groups that mainstream society deemed outside the norm, including not only Jews but poor people, LGBTQ people, ethnic minorities, hobos, prostitutes, and bohemians.

These neighborhoods, which often arise from crowded, highly dense, and often deteriorated inner city districts, are critical sites where members of gender and sexual minorities have traditionally congregated. From one perspective, these spaces are places of marginality created by an often homophobic, biphobic, and transphobic heterosexual community; from another perspective, they are places of refuge where members of gender and sexual minorities can benefit from the concentration of safe, nondiscriminatory resources and services, similarly to other minorities.

In some cities, LGBTQ people congregate in visibly identified neighborhoods, while in others, they are dispersed in neighborhoods, which have less visibility, because a liberal, affirming counterculture is present. For example, LGBTQ residents of Philadelphia developed the city's Gayborhood, LGBTQ people in San Francisco congregate in the Castro neighborhood, while LGBTQ people in Seattle concentrate in the city's older bohemian stomping grounds of Capitol Hill, and those of Montreal have concentrated in a working-class neighborhood referred to administratively as "Centre-Sud" but largely known as "Le Village". These areas, however, have higher concentrations of LGBTQ residents and businesses that cater to them than do surrounding neighborhoods. Some cities, like Austin, Texas, have not developed a defined gay village despite the city of Austin being home to many LGBTQ people with developed LGBTQ-friendly businesses and a counterculture present.

== History ==
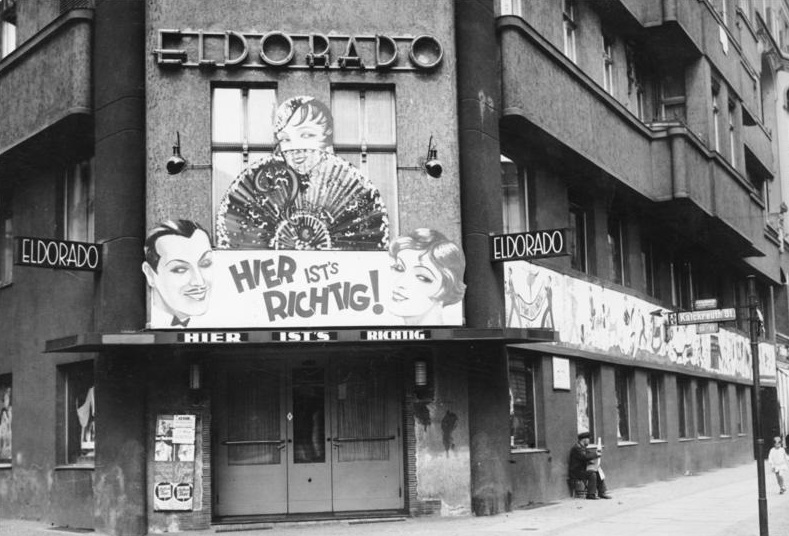
Gay bar "Eldorado" in Berlin-Schöneberg, 1932

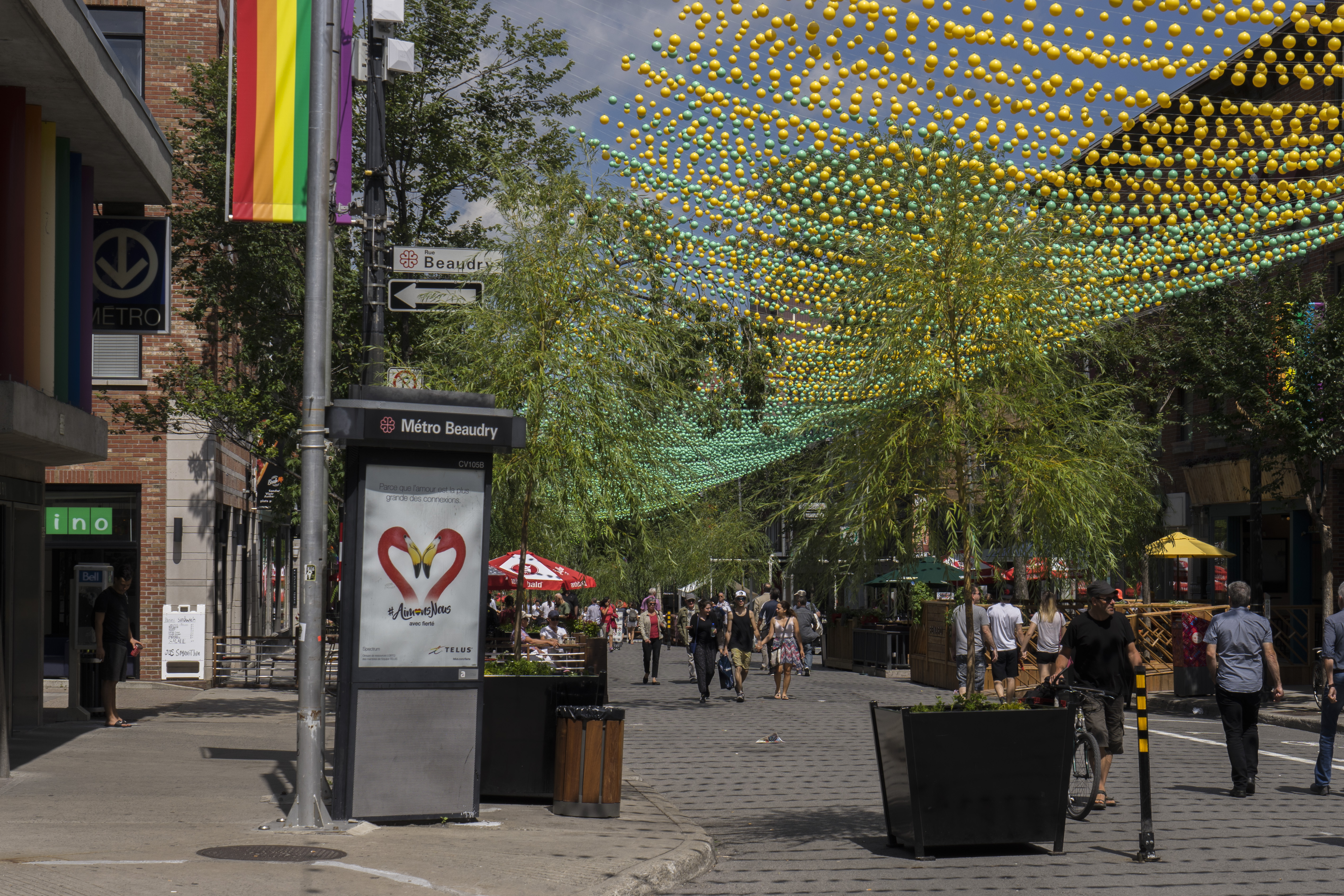
Le Village gai, in Montreal

The neighbourhood of Schöneberg in Berlin was the first gay village in the world, developing in the 1920s. Prior to the 1960s and 1970s, specialized LGBTQ communities did not exist as gay villages in the United States; bars were usually where LGBTQ social networks developed, and they were located in certain urban areas where police zoning would implicitly allow so-called "deviant entertainment" under close surveillance.

In New York, for example, the congregation of gay men had not been illegal since 1965; however, no openly gay bar had been granted a license to serve alcohol. The police raid of a private gay club called the Stonewall Inn on June 27, 1969, led to a series of minor disturbances in the neighborhood of the bar over the course of the subsequent three days and involving more than 1,000 people. The Stonewall Rebellion managed to change not only the profile of the gay community but the dynamic within the community itself. This, along with several other similar incidents, precipitated the appearance of gay ghettos throughout North America, as spatial organization shifted from bars and street-cruising to specific neighborhoods. This transition "from the bars to the streets, from nightlife to daytime, from 'sexual deviance' to an alternative lifestyle" was the critical moment in the development of the gay community. On June 24, 2016, the Stonewall National Monument was named the first US National Monument dedicated to the LGBTQ-rights movement. Montreal's Gay Village developed a bilingual French and English identity reflective of the city itself.

Online communities had developed globally by the early 2000s as a resource connecting gay villagers worldwide to provide information for arts, travel, business, gay counseling, and legal services, aiming to provide safe and gay-friendly environments for members of LGBTQ communities in general.

== Characteristics ==
Gay villages can vary widely from city to city and from country to country. Furthermore, some large cities also develop "satellite" gay villages that are essentially "overflow" areas. In such cases, gay men and lesbians have become priced-out of the main gay village and move to other, more affordable areas, thereby creating an entirely new gay village, also thereby furthering the process of gentrification by pricing-out long held tenants of these areas. In New York City, many gays in the 1990s moved to the Chelsea neighborhood from the Greenwich Village neighborhood as a less expensive alternative; subsequent to this movement, house prices in Chelsea have increased dramatically to rival the West Village within Greenwich Village itself. Similarly, gentrification is dramatically changing Philadelphia's Gayborhood, and the city's LGBTQ community is expanding across the city. Other examples include, in Boston, gay men moving to the South End and lesbians migrating to Jamaica Plain; while in Chicago, gays have moved to the Andersonville area as an offshoot of the Boystown/Lakeview neighborhood. Some gay villages are not neighborhoods at all, but instead are entirely separate municipalities from the city for which they serve as the primary gay enclave, such as West Hollywood in the Los Angeles area, and Wilton Manors in the Miami/Fort Lauderdale area.

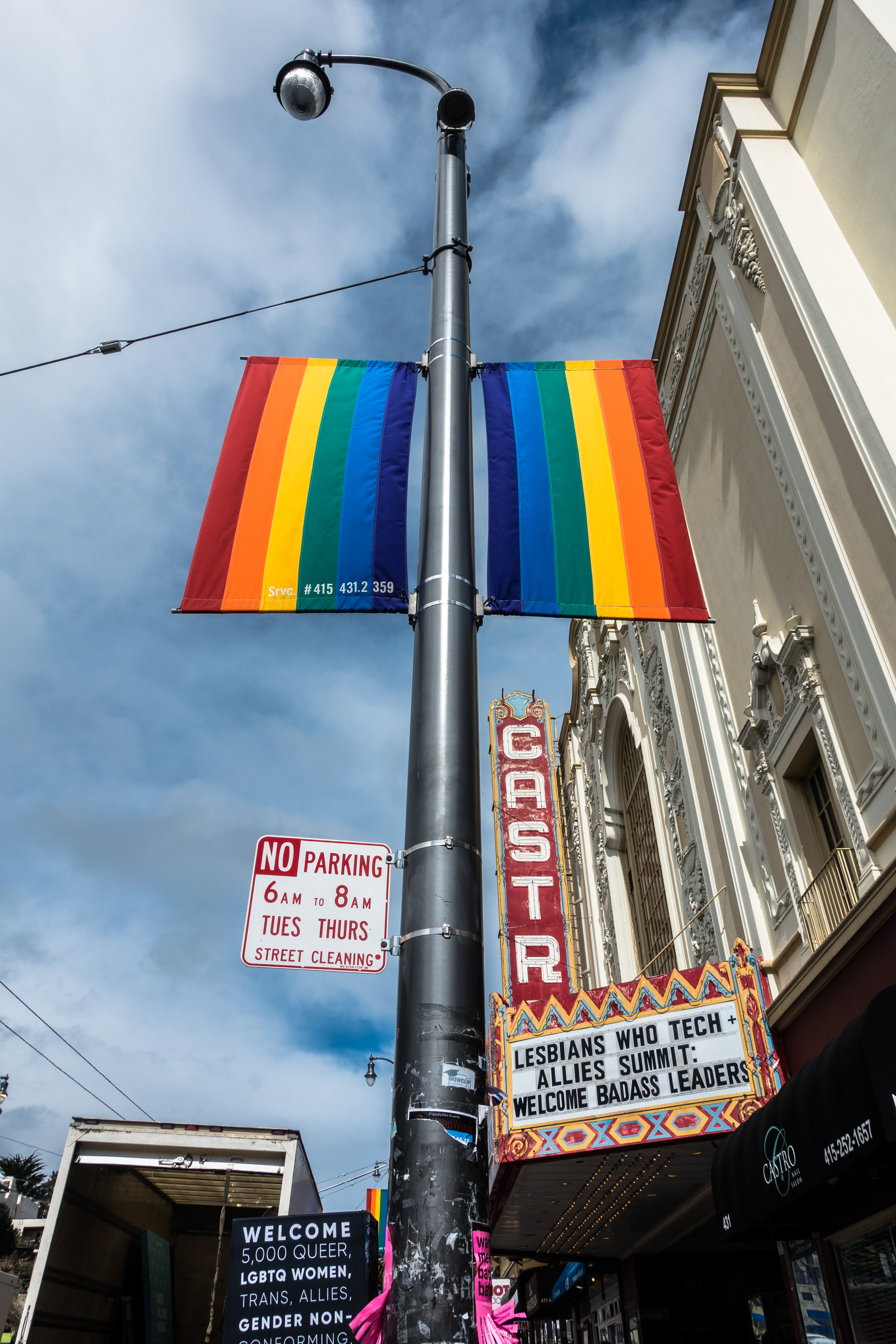
The Castro Neighborhood of San Francisco

These processes are tied to the spatial nature of the urban renaissance which was occurring at the time. The "first wave" of low-wage gay residences in these urban centers paved the way for other, more affluent gay professionals to move into the neighborhoods; this wealthier group played a significant role in the gentrification of many inner city neighborhoods. The presence of gay men in the real estate industry of San Francisco was a major factor facilitating the urban renaissance of the city in the 1970s.

However, the gentrification of gay villages may also serve to reinforce stereotypes of gays, by pushing out gay people who do not conform to the prevailing "gay, white, affluent, professional" image. Such people (including gay people of color, low-income/working-class gays, and "undesirable" groups such as gay prostitutes and leathermen) are usually forced out of the "village" due to rising rents or constant harassment at the hands of an increased policing presence. Especially in San Francisco's Polk Gulch neighborhood (the first "gay village" in that city), gentrification seems to have had this result.

Gay men and women have a reputation for driving the revitalization of previously run-down enclaves. Making these neighborhoods more desirable places to live, businesses and other classes of people move to the area and, accordingly, property values tend to go up. The urban studies theorist Richard Florida claims that their mere presence lures investors and jobs, particularly of the high-technology kind. They are, he says, "the canaries of the creative economy". Cities that have gay villages and are more tolerant towards gays, generally tend to have stronger, more robust, and creative economies, as compared to cities that are less tolerant towards gays. Florida says that cities as such have a stronger creative class, which is integral in bringing in new ideas that stimulate economies.

=== Consumerization ===
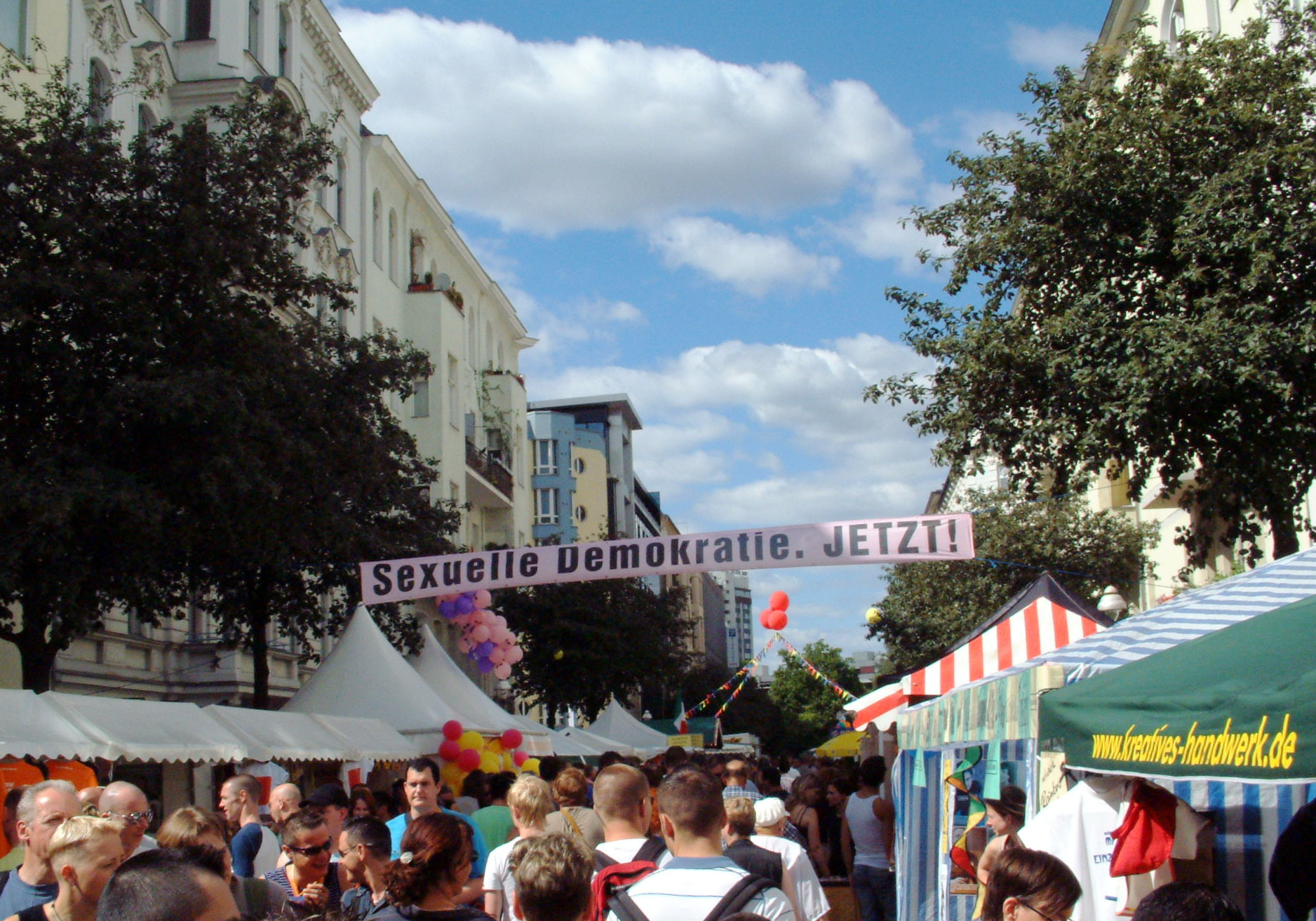
The area around Berlin's Nollendorfplatz and Motzstrasse

The gentrification of once rundown inner-city areas, coupled with the staging of pride parades in these areas, has resulted in the increased visibility of gay communities. Parades such as Sydney's Gay and Lesbian Mardi Gras and Manchester's Pride events attract significant investment and create tourist revenue, and cities have acknowledged that the acceptance of lesbian and gay culture has become a sign of urban "sophistication" and that gay-oriented events, such as pride parades and the Gay Games, are potentially lucrative events, attracting thousands of gay tourists and their dollars. The growing recognition of the economic value of the gay community is not only associated with their wealth but also with the role that lesbians and gay men have played (and continue to play) in urban revitalization.

== List of gay villages ==
=== Africa ===
==== South Africa ====
Cape Town is a global destination for gay tourism, and is known as Africa's gay capital. The city is regarded as one of the friendliest in the world towards LGBTQ individuals.

Just beside Cape Town's central business district is the gayborhood of De Waterkant, which features a Pink Lane tour route past numerous LGBTQ-related establishments, installed to celebrate the local LGBTQ community's history and diversity. The suburb's permanent rainbow crosswalk is the official starting point of the city's annual Pride March, one of the events that takes place during the Cape Town Pride festival.

=== North America ===
==== United States ====
Data from the 2010 United States census showed that Provincetown, Massachusetts, had the most gay couples out of any city in the United States. Provincetown, or Ptown, was also voted "Best Resort Town in 2011" by Gaycities.com. The town had far more gay marriages than straight marriages performed since 2003 when Massachusetts legalized same-sex marriage. The town's various businesses sponsor Gay Men's Week, Women's Week, Bear Week, Family Week (for same-sex families), and their version of a gay pride parade, Carnival. Famous gay residents currently include journalist Andrew Sullivan, filmmaker John Waters, and comedian Kate Clinton.

Boystown in Chicago is also a very well-defined gay village situated within the larger Lakeview neighborhood. Lakeview is an affluent neighborhood with a reputation for being a stronghold of liberal and progressive political views. Outside of Boystown, Lakeview is a mixture of both gay and straight citizens and families, but Boystown is the main gay village. Boystown began with a cluster of bars on North Halsted Street and blossomed into an entire district dedicated to LGBTQ life and culture in the 1980s. According to the founders of Sidetrack, one of these pioneering bars, Boystown was only to grow as much as it did because its residents were politically engaged and actively resisted city efforts to drive them underground. Gay bars in Boystown also served as a hub of AIDS-related activism.

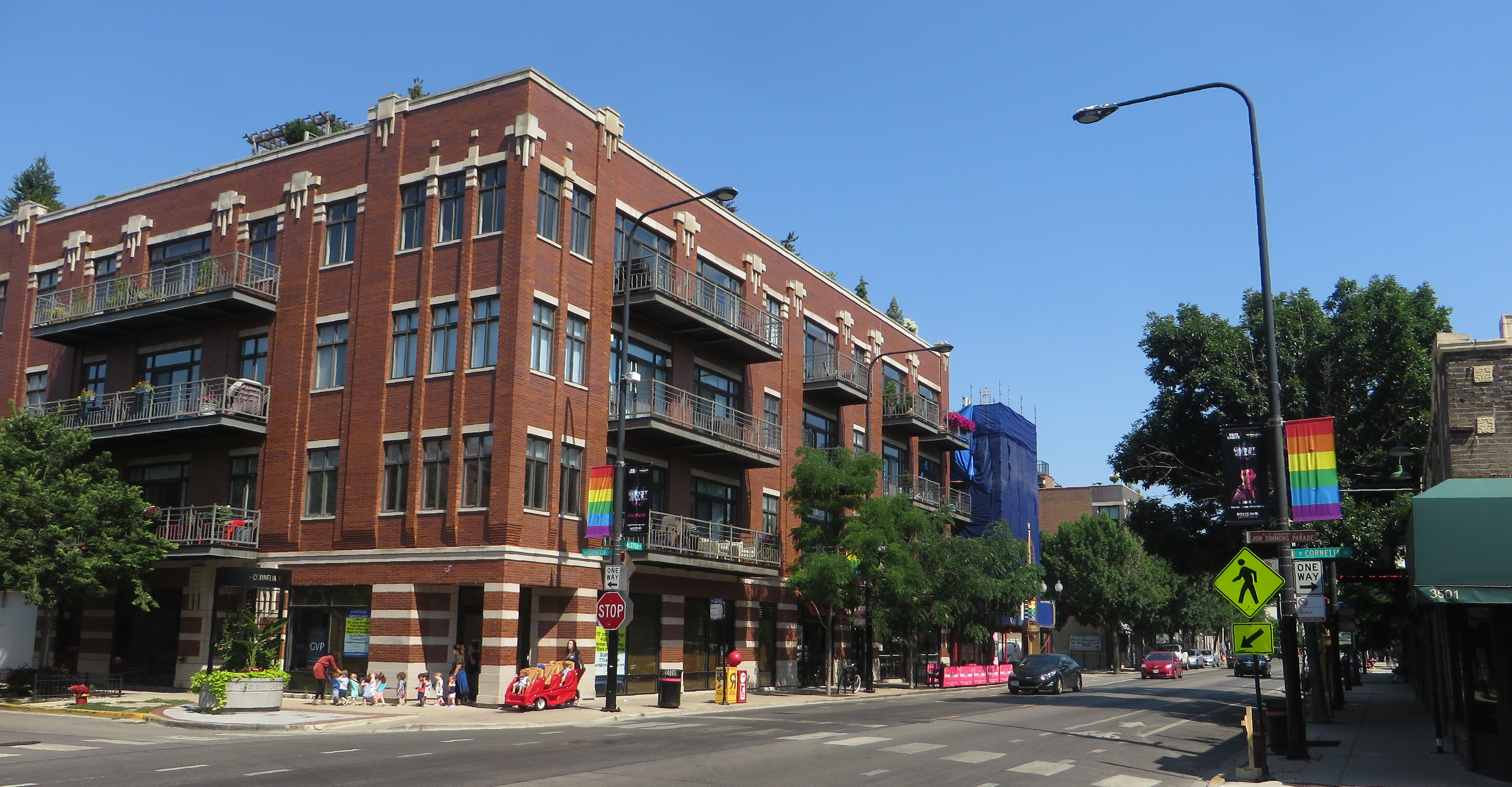
Boystown in Chicago, Illinois

Andersonville is another of Chicago's gay villages. It became known as "Girlstown" in the 1980s and 1990s following an influx of lesbian couples to the area. Residents attribute this initial migration to a well-loved feminist bookstore called Women and Children First moving to Andersonville after being priced out of Boystown. In the mid-2000s, more families and older people started moving into Boystown, and many gay men also made the move to Girlstown. In the last decade, the number of married gay men in Andersonville actually surpassed the number of married lesbians and many of the neighborhood's lesbian-centric business have closed. Still, Andersonville retains its historical significance for the lesbian community and its identity as a haven for LGBTQ people.

Despite its large gay population and higher concentration of gay venues, the South Beach area in Miami Beach, Florida, was never exclusively gay, because of its popularity among straight people alike. Philadelphia's traditional gay village comprises several downtown blocks and is called "the Gayborhood". The LGBTQ culture in Philadelphia has an established presence that includes clubs, bars, and restaurants as well as health facilities for the LGBTQ community. Philadelphia's Gayborhood contains 68 rainbow street signs throughout the community. Washington, D.C.'s Dupont Circle and Logan Circle area are known for its many gay oriented bars, restaurants, and shops. Dupont Circle is also known for its annual High Heel Drag Queen Race. The Short North in downtown Columbus, Ohio, is primarily known as an art district, but has a strong gay community and a high concentration of gay-oriented clubs and bars. In Boston, the trendy and upscale South End neighborhood has a large population of gay men, and the Jamaica Plain and Roslindale neighborhoods are home to scores of lesbians, also with vibrant but less trendy downtown areas. Montreal's Gay Village (Le Village, in French) is considered one of North America's largest in population, concentration, and scope.

San Diego has its own gay village called Hillcrest, which sits around Balboa Park. Hillcrest is very close to the downtown area but is able to maintain a small town eclectic feel. While it is considered by most as the gay area of San Diego with its gay bars and dance clubs, the overall population of the area has only gotten more and more diverse with the rise in condominium projects. Having been priced out of owning or renting in the Hillcrest area, the San Diego LGBTQ community has spread outward for miles into North Park, University Heights and dozens more neighborhoods. These diverse, welcoming areas have slowly continued the gentrifying process.

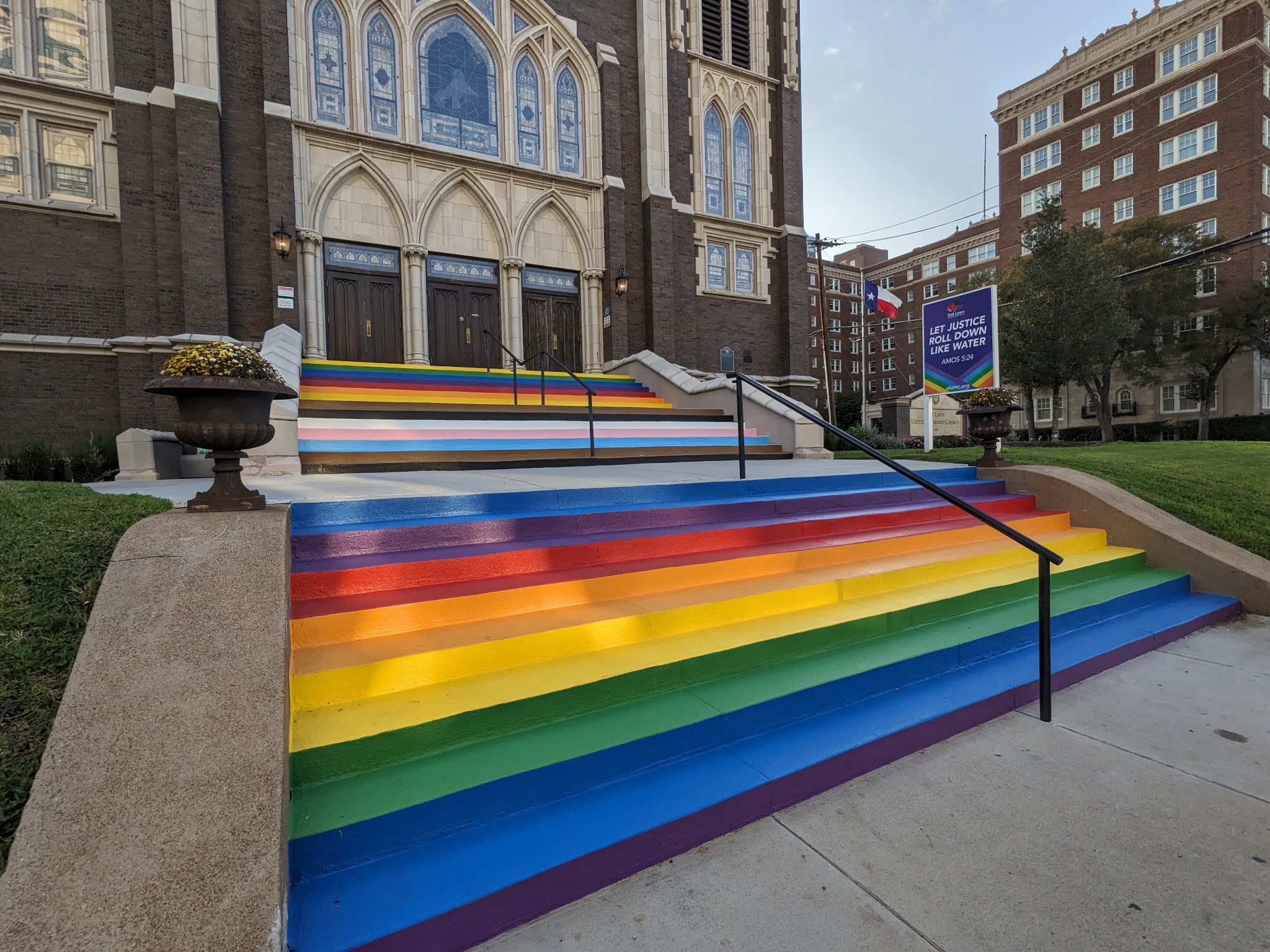
In Dallas, the steps at Oak Lawn United Methodist Church were painted in rainbow colors in October 2025 after Governor Greg Abbott ordered a nearby rainbow-colored crosswalk to be removed.

The Oak Lawn neighborhood of Dallas is the center of the city's gayborhood, hosting businesses and health resources for the queer community.

In Minneapolis, Minnesota, areas surrounding Loring Park, site of the local LGBTQ pride festival, are regarded as a "gay" neighborhood, though many gay and lesbian people have migrated to more residential neighborhoods such as Bryn Mawr and Whittier.

In Tampa, Florida, the gay community was traditionally spread out among several neighborhoods. In the early 21st century, the Ybor City National Historic Landmark District has seen the creation of the GaYbor District, which is now the center of gay and lesbian life in the Tampa Bay area and home to the majority of gay bars and dance clubs, restaurants, and service organizations. Across Tampa Bay in St. Petersburg, the LGBTQ community is centered around the Grand Central neighborhood near downtown. In Orlando, Florida, the gay community is centered around the neighborhoods of Thornton Park and Eola Heights.

Asbury Park, New Jersey, and the adjacent town of Ocean Grove, New Jersey, house large gay communities. Many vacationers who visit Asbury Park are gay, and the city houses New Jersey's only gay hotel, The Empress Hotel. Collingswood, New Jersey, a suburb of Philadelphia, also houses a prominent year-round gay community. Ogunquit, Maine, has a gay population of year-round residents and second homeowners.

Greater Los Angeles includes several gayborhoods, most notably West Hollywood, Silver Lake, the Run in Downtown Los Angeles, and the Broadway Corridor in Long Beach.

In 2019, Village Hearth was founded in Durham, North Carolina, as one of the first LGBTQ co-housing developments in the United States.

==== Canada ====
Church and Wellesley is an LGBTQ-oriented community located in Toronto, Canada. It is roughly bounded by Gould Street to the south, Yonge Street to the west, Charles Street to the north, and Jarvis Street to the east, with the intersection of Church and Wellesley Streets at the centre of this area. Though some gay- and lesbian-oriented establishments can be found outside of this area, the general boundaries of this village have been defined by the Gay Toronto Tourism Guild.

Some cities have a very well-defined gay village in the heart of a larger area that also has a significant gay population. One example of this phenomenon is Davie Village in the heart of Vancouver's gay community. It sits within the greater West End area, which, though decently populated by gay people, is not necessarily considered a gay village.

Ottawa established an LGBTQ-friendly village along Bank Street in Centretown on November 4, 2011, when the City of Ottawa installed six street signs at the intersections of Bank/Nepean, Bank/Somerset and Bank/James. This is the cap to an historic year and six years of lobbying, where the village installed two public art projects in addition to tripling the number of rainbow flags in the village area. The village in Ottawa features a diverse mix of businesses and organizations, many of which cater to or of specific interest to the LGBTQ community, and has a high concentration of LGBTQ persons living and working in the area.

=== Europe ===
There are a number of gay villages in the United Kingdom, such as in Birmingham, Brighton, Leeds, Liverpool, London, Manchester and Nottingham.

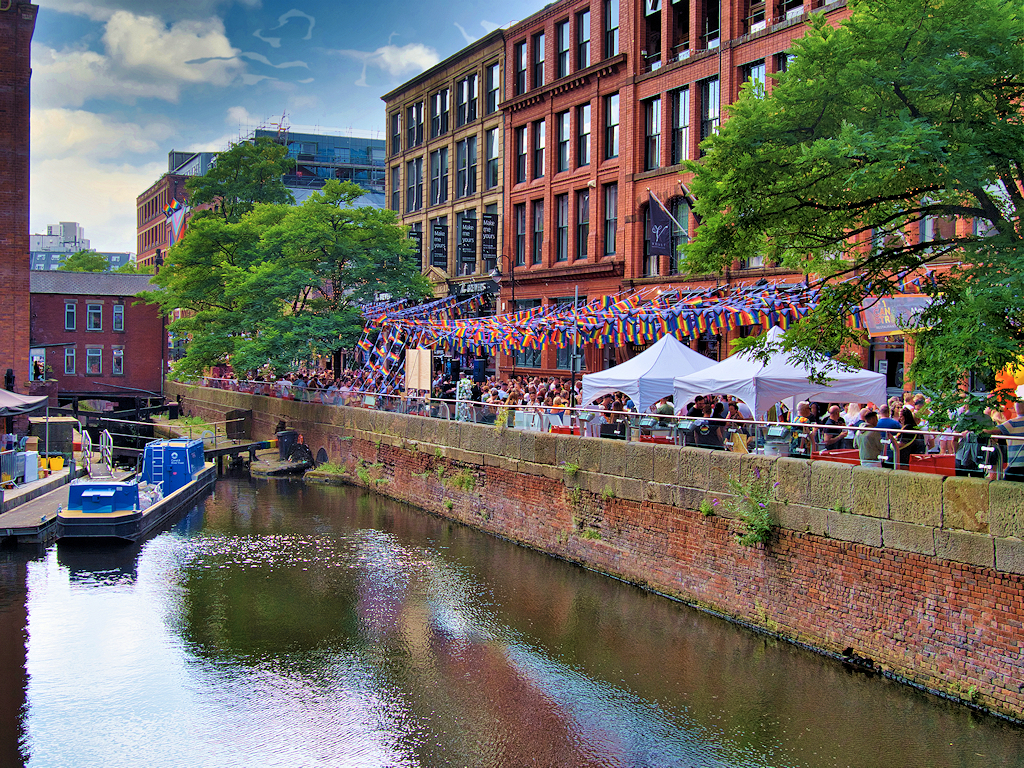
Canal Street, Manchester

The neighbourhood of Le Marais in Paris has experienced a growing gay presence since the 1980s, as evidenced by the existence of a large gay community and of many gay cafés, nightclubs, cabarets and shops, such as one of the largest gay clubs in Europe, Le Depot. These establishments are mainly concentrated in the southwestern portion of the Marais, many on or near the streets Sainte-Croix de la Bretonnerie and Vieille du Temple.

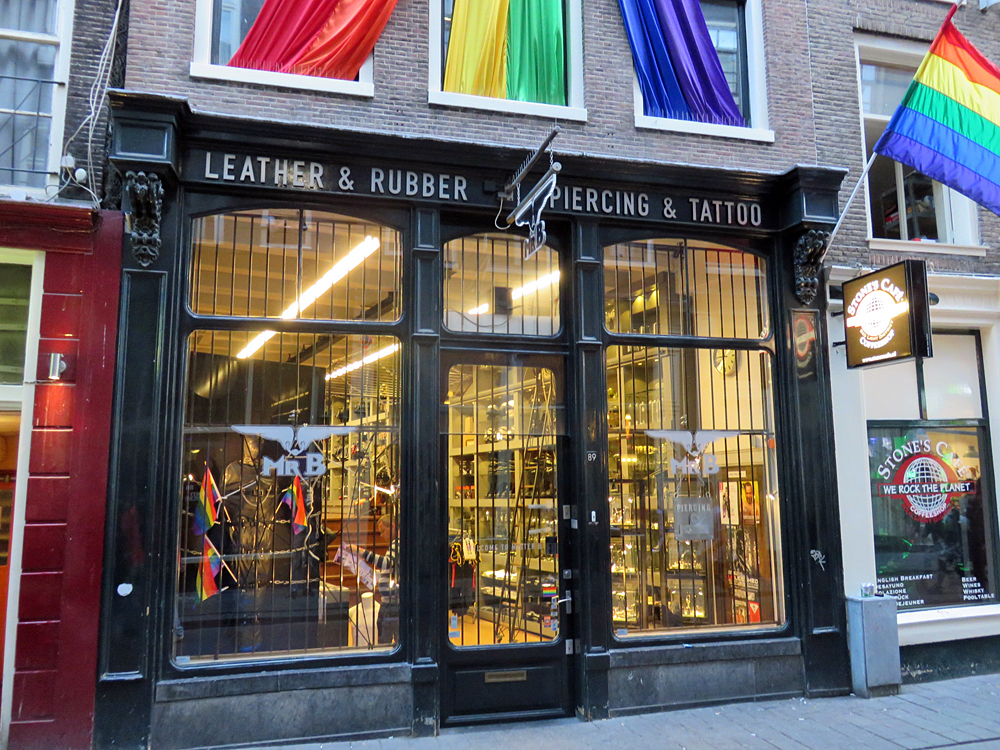
Warmoesstraat, (Amsterdam)

A well-known gay village of Sitges is one of the richest residential areas within the area of greater Barcelona. The town hosts several gay events throughout the year, such as Gay Pride and Bears Week. The first monument for the gay community, an inverse triangle, was built in Passeig Maritim street in 2006. Many gay tourists use the gay-friendly accommodation in Sitges during Circuit Festival of Barcelona.

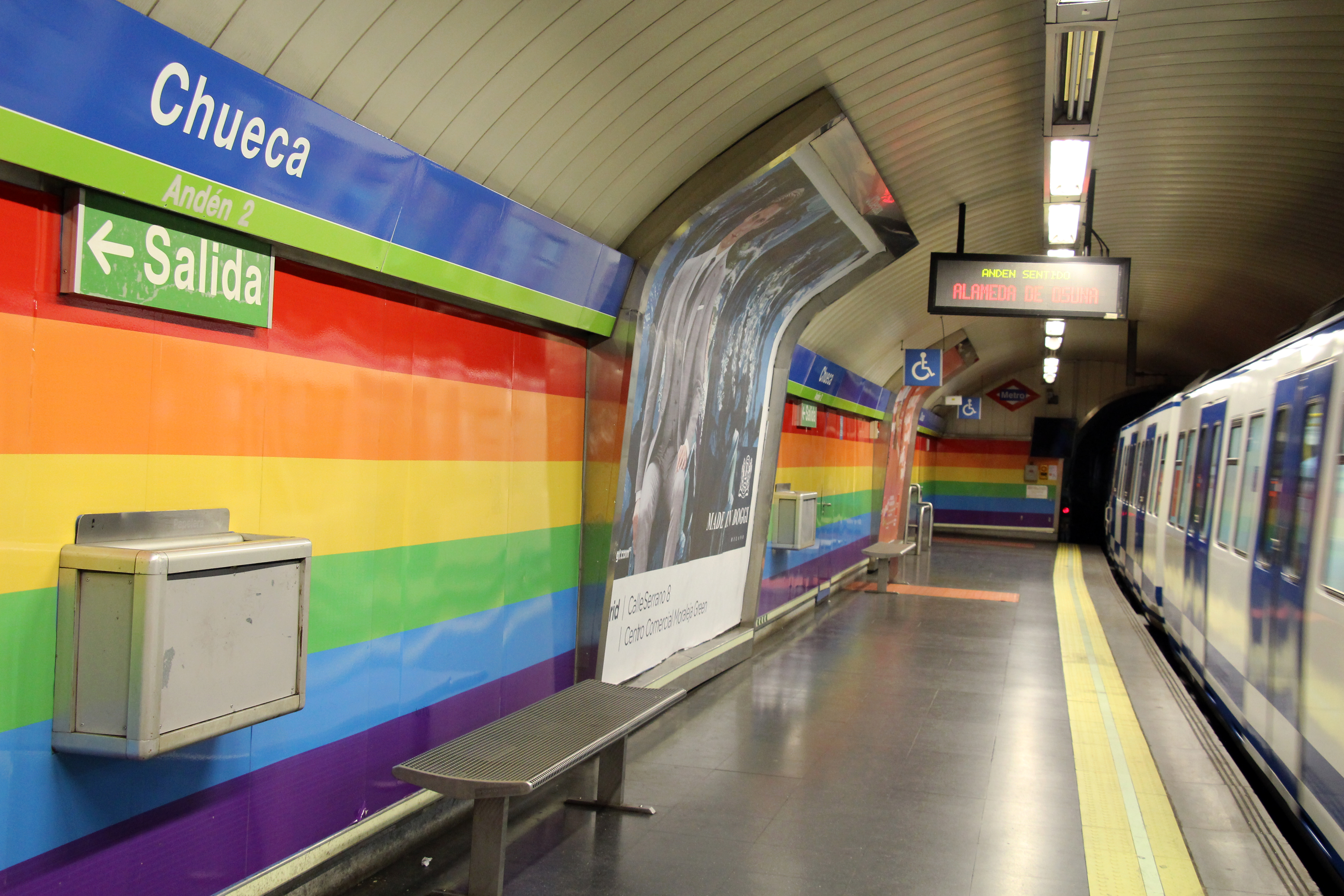
The metro platform at Chueca metro station in Madrid

Not all major cities have gay villages, especially those with more progressive histories with LGBTQ rights. Sweden, for example, legalized same sexual activity in 1944, a full 67 years before Lawrence v. Texas decriminalized homosexuality in the US. As a result, there was not the same need for secret gathering places in Swedish cities that shaped many gay villages elsewhere. However, there are areas which were historically known as meeting places for gays, such as Södermalm in Stockholm, Punavuori and Kallio in Helsinki, which remain as somewhat trendy areas for gay people to live in, though they do not have a predominantly gay population.

=== Australasia ===
==== Australia ====
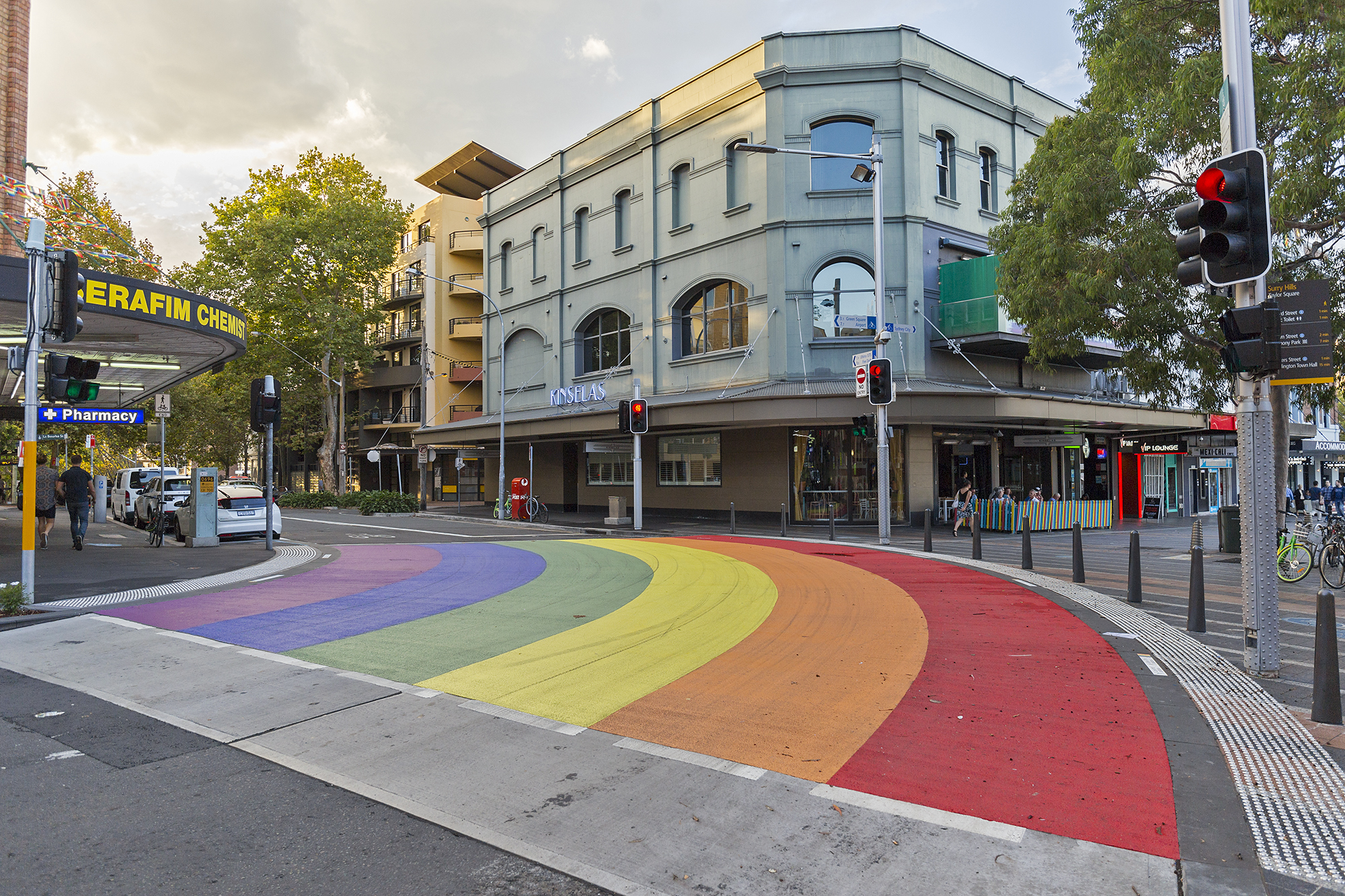
The original Rainbow Crossing in Sydney's Surry Hills neighbourhood

In Sydney, New South Wales, Potts Point (also known as "Poofs Point") and nearby Elizabeth Bay (also known as "Betty Bay") are renowned for having the largest gay population in the city, with many gay run business. The area is known for having the highest density of population in Australia with many Art Deco apartment blocks. Newtown also has a sizable gay population but it has a more gritty bohemian feel. Darlinghurst is also a historically gay area. Oxford Street in particular is known as the Golden Mile due to its long stretch of LGBTQ bars and clubs.

In Melbourne, Victoria, city fringe suburbs such as Collingwood and South Yarra have sizeable gay communities. Big 7 Travel ranked Melbourne as the fourth most LGBTQ friendly city in the world.

=== Asia ===
==== Thailand ====
In Pattaya, Thailand, Boyztown is a hub of gay nightlife and entertainment that is especially popular with European and Chinese tourists. Since its peak in the 1990s and early 2000s, rising prices and COVID policies have caused Boyztown to lose some of its business. At the peak of its popularity, Boyztown drew in funding for AIDS-related charity organizations through grand events like the Pattaya Gay Festival.

==== Japan ====
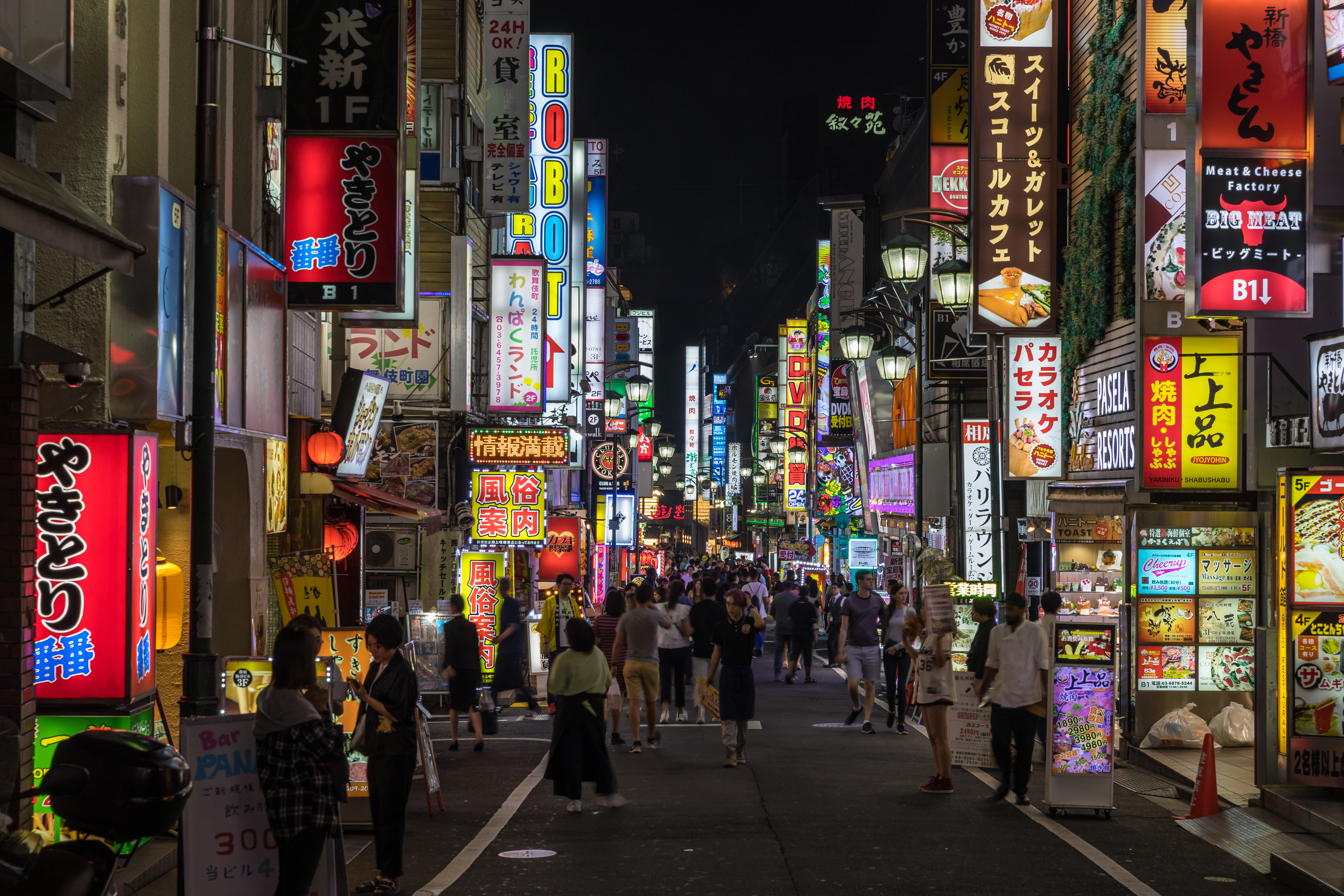
Shinjuku Ni-chōme, Tokyo

Shinjuku Ni-chōme, Tokyo's gay village, boasts the world's highest density of gay and lesbian bars, many of which are very small and highly curated to a particular scene. Some are intended for foreign tourists, while others give priority to regulars and court a certain subset of the local LGBTQ community, such as butch lesbians or the BDSM community. Ni-chōme is also home to Japan's first LGBTQ center, Pride House Tokyo Legacy. Like Pattaya's Boyztown, Nichō's business suffered during the pandemic, but it is slowly developing its former popularity.

=== South America ===
Bogotá, Colombia, has a prominent gay village called the Chapinero. The locus of the Chapinero's LGBTQ culture is one of the most famous gay nightclubs in the world, Theatron, which opened in the 1990s. Before Theatron, the Chapinero had a vibrant drag ball scene that drew crowds from neighboring South American countries.

== LGBTQ populations ==
=== Top LGBTQ populations in Brazilian cities ===
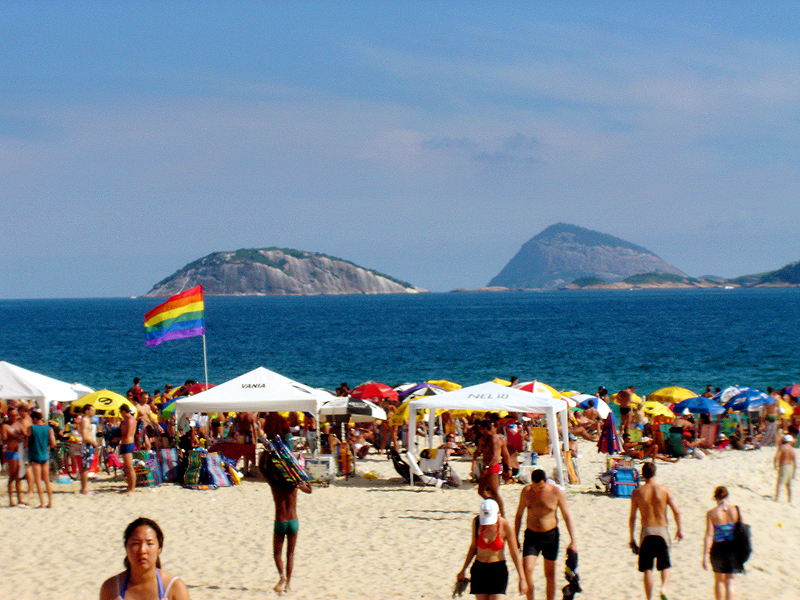
LGBTQ part of Ipanema Beach in Rio de Janeiro, Brazil

In 2009, a survey conducted by the University of São Paulo in 10 Brazilian state capitals estimated that 7.8% of Brazil's male population was gay and 2.6% was bisexual (a total of 10.4%), while 4.9% of the female population was estimated to be lesbian and 1.4% bisexual (a total of 6.3%).

In the city of Rio de Janeiro, 19.3% of the male population was estimated to be gay or bisexual. Among the female population in the city of Manaus, 10.2% were estimated to be lesbian or bisexual.

Top Brazilian cities in LGBTQ population by percentage of residents
Rank	City	Percentage of city population
1	Rio de Janeiro	14.30%
2	Fortaleza	9.35%
3	Manaus	8.35%
4	São Paulo	8.20%
5	Salvador	8.05%
6	Brasília	7.95%
7	Belo Horizonte	6.85%
8	Curitiba	6.55%
9	Porto Alegre	5.95%
10	Cuiabá	5.65%

=== Top LGBTQ populations in the US ===
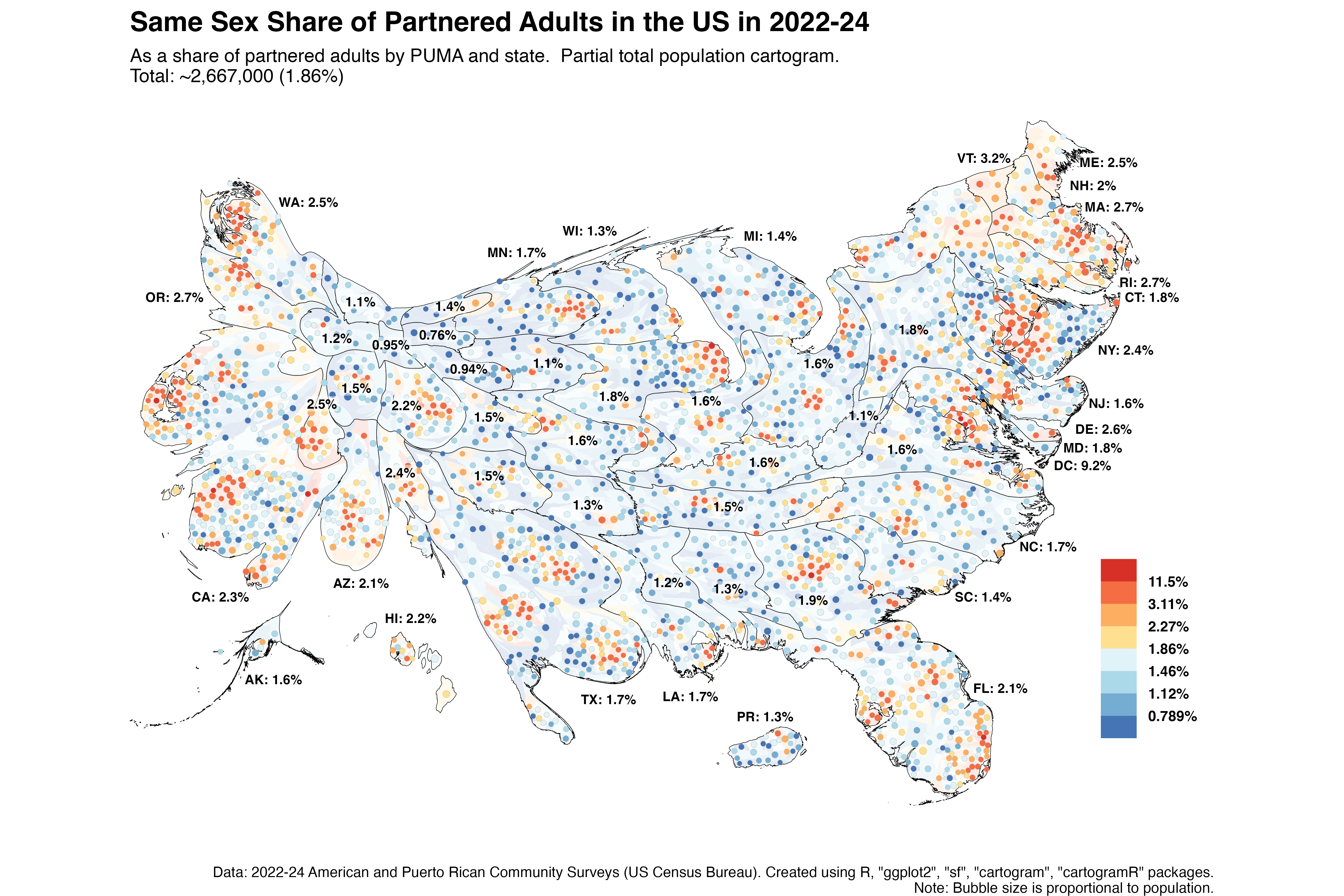
Same-sex share of cohabitating partners by PUMA and state in 2024

An estimated 33 to 50 percent of Palm Springs, California, are gay male or other parts of the LGBTQ community; this statistic makes them the largest percentage community in the US.

The following charts show a list of the top US cities, states, and metro areas with:

1. the highest population of gay residents, and
2. the highest percentage of gay residents within city limits. (LGBTQ population as a percentage of total residents). The numbers given are estimates based on American Community Survey. The US Census does not ask for sexual orientation or gender identity.

US cities with the highest percentage of LGBTQ individuals in 2006

Top US cities in LGBTQ population by number of LGBTQ residents
LGBTQ population rank	City	Percentage of city population	LGBTQ population	US population rank
1	New York City	4.5%	377,100	1
2	Los Angeles	5.6%	222,488	2
3	Chicago	5.7%	153,843	3
4	San Francisco	15.4%	134,716	17
5	Phoenix	6.4%	106,112	5
6	Houston	4.4%	101,772	4
7	San Diego	6.8%	96,220	8
8	Seattle	12.9%	95,621	18
9	Dallas	7.0%	93,730	9
10	Boston	12.3%	84,787	24
11	Philadelphia	4.2%	66,444	6
12	Atlanta	12.8%	63,698	38
13	San Jose	5.8%	59,682	10
14	Denver	8.2%	58,701	19
15	Washington, D.C.	8.1%	57,561	23
16	Portland	8.8%	57,233	26
17	Minneapolis	12.5%	53,744	46

Top US cities in LGBTQ population by percentage of total residents
LGBTQ percentage rank	City	Percentage of city population	LGBTQ population
1	San Francisco	15.4%	134,716
2	Seattle	12.9%	95,621
3	Atlanta	12.8%	63,698
4	Minneapolis	12.5%	53,744
5	Boston	12.3%	84,787
6	Sacramento	9.8%	49,341
7	Portland	8.8%	57,233
8	Denver	8.2%	58,701
9	Washington, D.C.	8.1%	57,561
10	Orlando	7.7%	21,930
11	Salt Lake City	7.6%	15,210
12	Dallas	7.0%	93,730

Top US metropolitan areas in LGBTQ population by percentage of total residents
Rank	Metro area	Percentage of metro population	LGBTQ population
1	San Francisco	8.2%	636,320
2	Seattle	6.5%	266,656
3	Boston	6.2%	306,381
4	Portland	6.1%	153,284
5	Tampa	5.9%	188,495
6	Austin	5.9%	134,718
7	Denver	5.8%	171,901
8	Minneapolis–Saint Paul	5.7%	210,344
9	Orlando	5.7%	152,382
10	Hartford	5.6%	82,996

Population

Top US CMSA in LGBTQ population by percentage of total residents
Rank	Consolidated Metropolitan Statistical Area	LGBTQ	LGBTQ % population
1	Miami – Miami Beach – Fort Lauderdale	289,824	4.7%
2	Atlanta – Marietta, Georgia – Sandy Springs, Georgia	294,694	4.3%
3	New York City – North Jersey – Long Island	943,306	4.0%
4	San Francisco – Oakland – San Jose, California	349,560	3.6%
5	Dallas – Fort Worth – Arlington, Texas	284,238	3.5%
6	Los Angeles – Long Beach, California – Santa Ana, California	628,668	3.4%
7	Boston – Cambridge, Massachusetts – Quincy, Massachusetts	287,850	3.4%
8	Chicago–Naperville–Joliet, Illinois	309,596	3.1%
9	Philadelphia – Camden, New Jersey – Wilmington, Delaware	200,107	2.8%
10	Washington Metropolitan Area	238,664	2.5%

Top US states in LGBTQ population by number of LGBTQ residents
Rank	State	Percentage of state population	LGBTQ population
1	California	5.2%	2,055,820
2	Texas	3.6%	1,031,040
3	Florida	4.6%	976,120
4	New York	4.2%	819,420
5	Illinois	3.8%	483,360
6	Ohio	4.0%	467,200
7	Pennsylvania	3.5%	447,650
8	Georgia	4.3%	452,360
9	Massachusetts	5.7%	391,761
10	Washington	5.7%	428,184

Top US states in LGBTQ population by percentage of total residents
Rank	State	LGBTQ population	
Rank	State	% of state population	#
1	New Hampshire	6.6%	89,430
2	Washington	5.7%	428,184
3	Massachusetts	5.7%	391,761
4	Maine	5.2%	69,731
5	California	5.2%	2,055,820
6	Colorado	5.1%	289,935
7	Vermont	5.1%	31,841
8	New Mexico	4.9%	102,753
9	Minnesota	4.7%	263,200

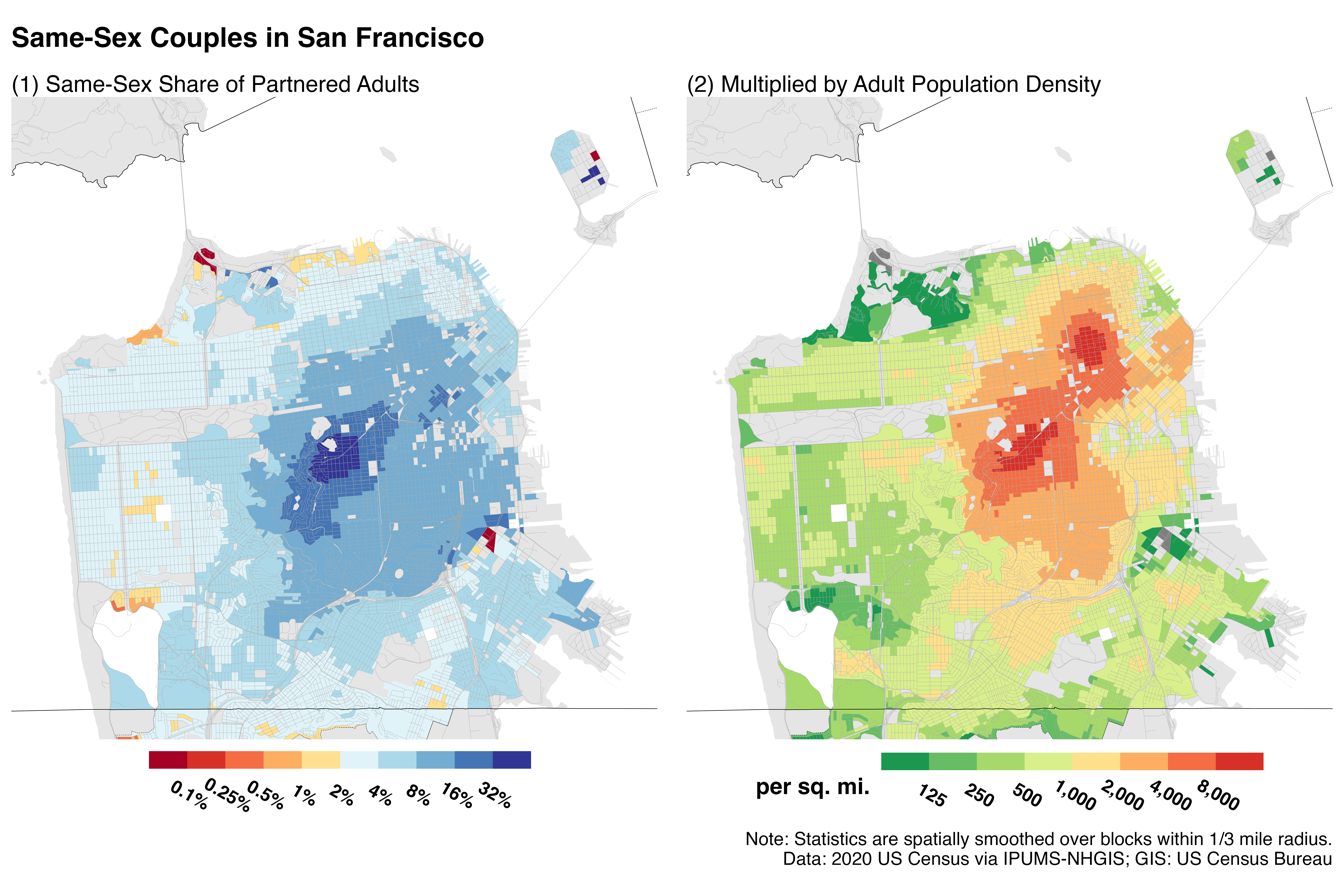
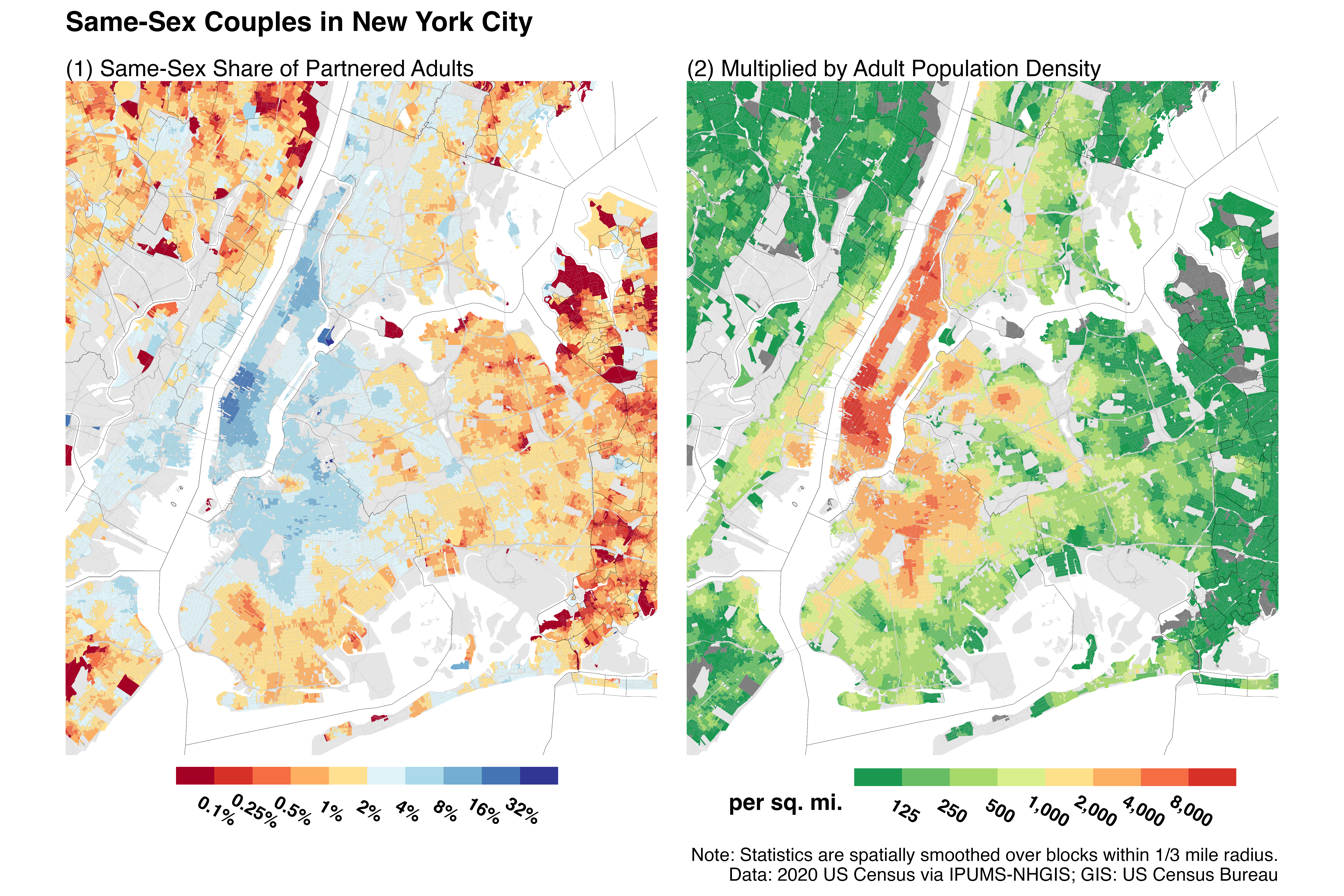
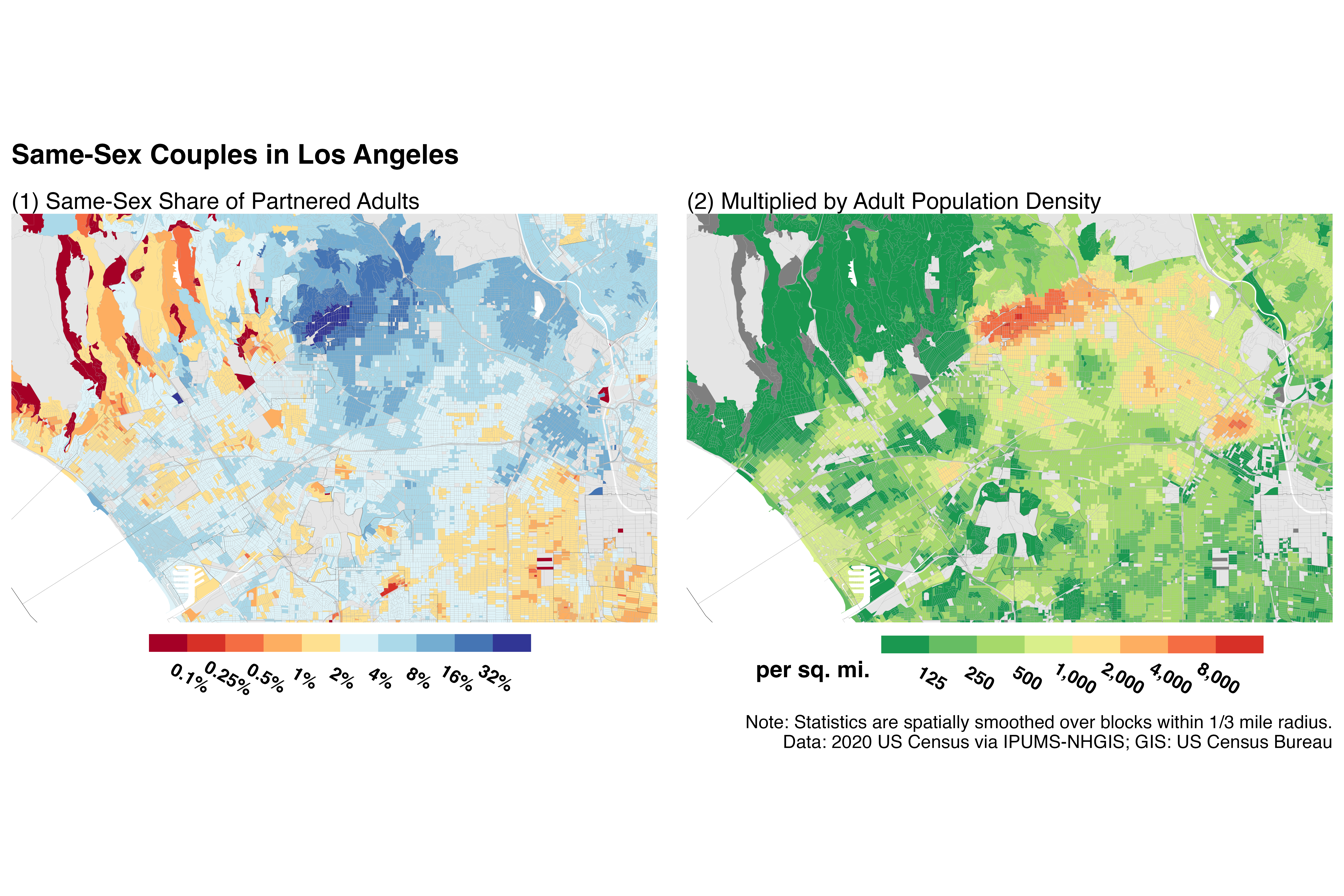
1: Map of same-sex couples in San Francisco; 2: Map of same-sex couples in Manhattan; 3: Map of same-sex couples in Los Angeles

== See also ==
- Ethnic enclave
- Homosocialization
- Lesbian bar
- LGBTQ tourism
- Gay villages in the UK
- Gay Street
