= Gay villages in the United Kingdom =

UK villages with progressive attitudes towards LGBTQ communities

The United Kingdom has a number of gay villages. Bigger cities and metropolitan areas are most popular as they are deemed to be more tolerant and tend to have "a history of progressive local government policy towards supporting and financing LGBTQ-friendly initiatives."

Rainbow Flag

There is also a noted circular pattern of migration, whereby once areas have established a reputation as somewhere LGBT people live, more LGBT people are drawn there. LGBT-inclusive areas of UK towns and cities tend to be defined by "a distinct geographic focal point, a unique culture, a cluster of commercial spaces" and sometimes a concentration of residences. It is thought that LGBT-inclusive areas help towns and cities in the UK to prosper economically, but some believe the building of such areas creates an isolating effect on some LGBT people who want to blend in.

== Birmingham ==
Birmingham is home to 60,000 gay people. The Birmingham Gay Village, which became prominent in the 1990s, is located around Hurst Street in Southside and features clubs, bars and shops.

Birmingham Pride is celebrated each year around the late May bank holiday weekend; its entertainment and festivities are centred around the Gay Village. Organisers estimated that Pride brings around £15 million to the city's economy. In 2014, it attracted over 50,000 people.

The city also has its own LGBT centre, opened in 2013, for support with health and well-being. Midlands Zone, the LGBT magazine for the region, was published every month (1997–2020.)

== Brighton ==
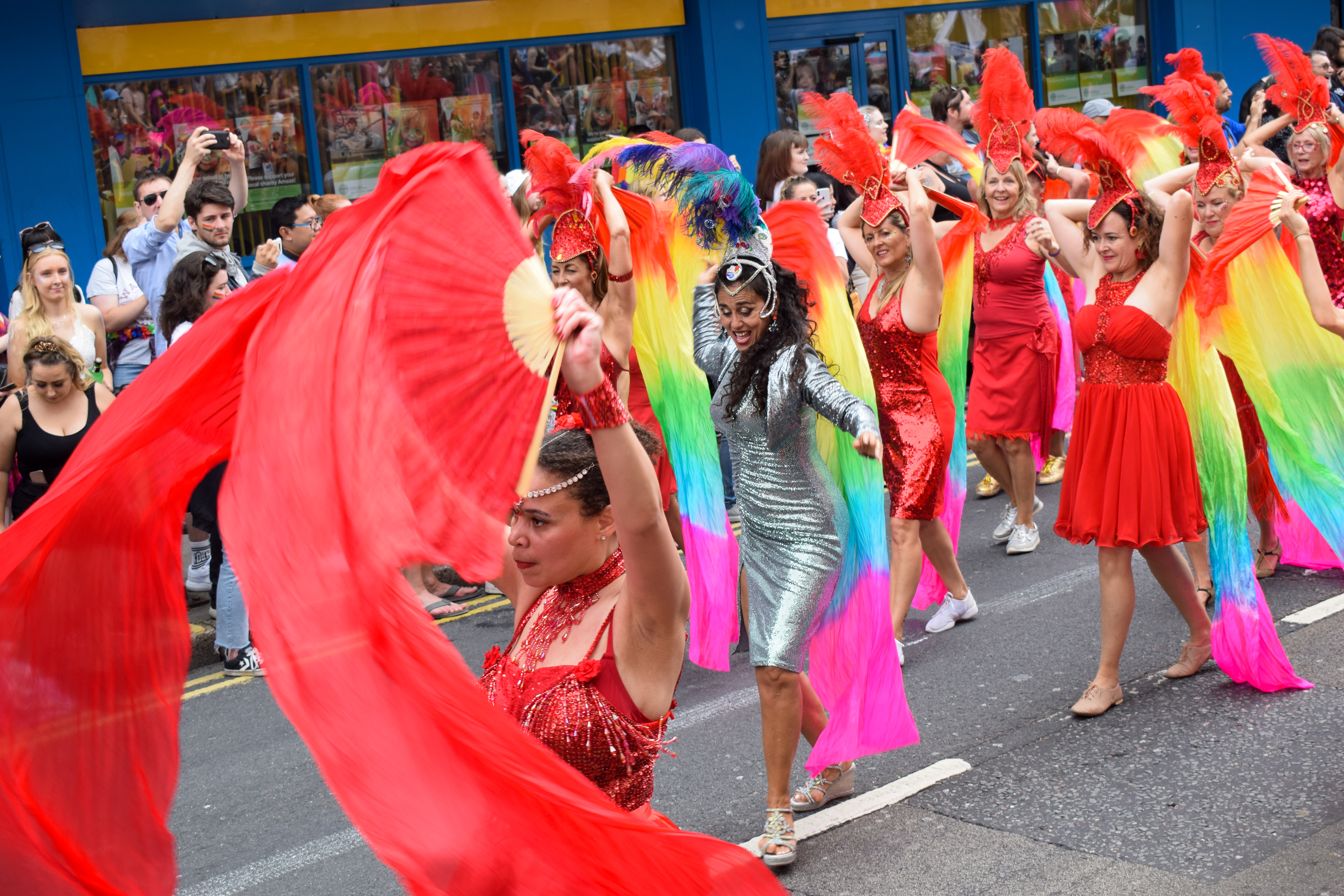
Brighton Pride

Brighton has a significant LGBT population, and records LGBT history in the city since the 19th century. Brighton Pride is at the start of August and attracts around 160,000 people every year. Many LGBT pubs, clubs, bars, restaurants, cafés and shops are located around Brighton and in particular around St James's Street in Kemptown.

In a 2014 estimate, 11–15% of the city's population aged 16 or over is thought to be lesbian, gay or bisexual. The city also had the highest percentage of same-sex households in the UK in 2004 and the largest number of civil partnership registrations outside of London in 2013.

== Bristol ==
Old Market is the main gay village in Bristol, with its scene centred on West Street. Across the city centre, Frogmore Street in the Old City is a gay area. Queenshilling first opened here in 1992, although the first post-1967 gay club to open in Bristol was the Moulin Rouge on Worrall Road, Clifton, in 1970.

The city's first Pride took place in 1977 as a fundraiser. Some unofficial celebrations took place in the 2000s until Bristol Pride was re-established in 2010.

== Cardiff ==
Cardiff has been ranked as the 8th most accepting city in the world for the LGBT community and is home to many gay venues such as the Golden Cross. The first Pride to be held in Cardiff took place in 1985.

== Edinburgh ==
Portobello, voted as one of the best neighbourhoods to live in the UK by The Times, is a vibrant gay community, with an annual Porty Pride event by the beach and a range of locally owned LGBTQ+ restaurants, cafes and local shops. The New Town end of Leith Walk from Picardy Place to Broughton Street is known locally as the 'Pink Triangle' and is home to a number of LGBTQ+ venues. The West End has also historically held LGBTQ connections, and has a number of LGBTQ+ friendly hotels.

== Hebden Bridge ==
Since the 1990s the Yorkshire market town of Hebden Bridge has been branded "the lesbian capital of the UK", and is reported to have the highest number of lesbians per capita anywhere in the UK.

== Leeds ==
Leeds's gay district is centred around Leeds Bridge and Lower Briggate in The Calls. Leeds Pride brings approximately 25,000 people to the city each year.

== Leicester ==
Leicester has an LGBT community and hosts Leicester Pride.

== Liverpool ==
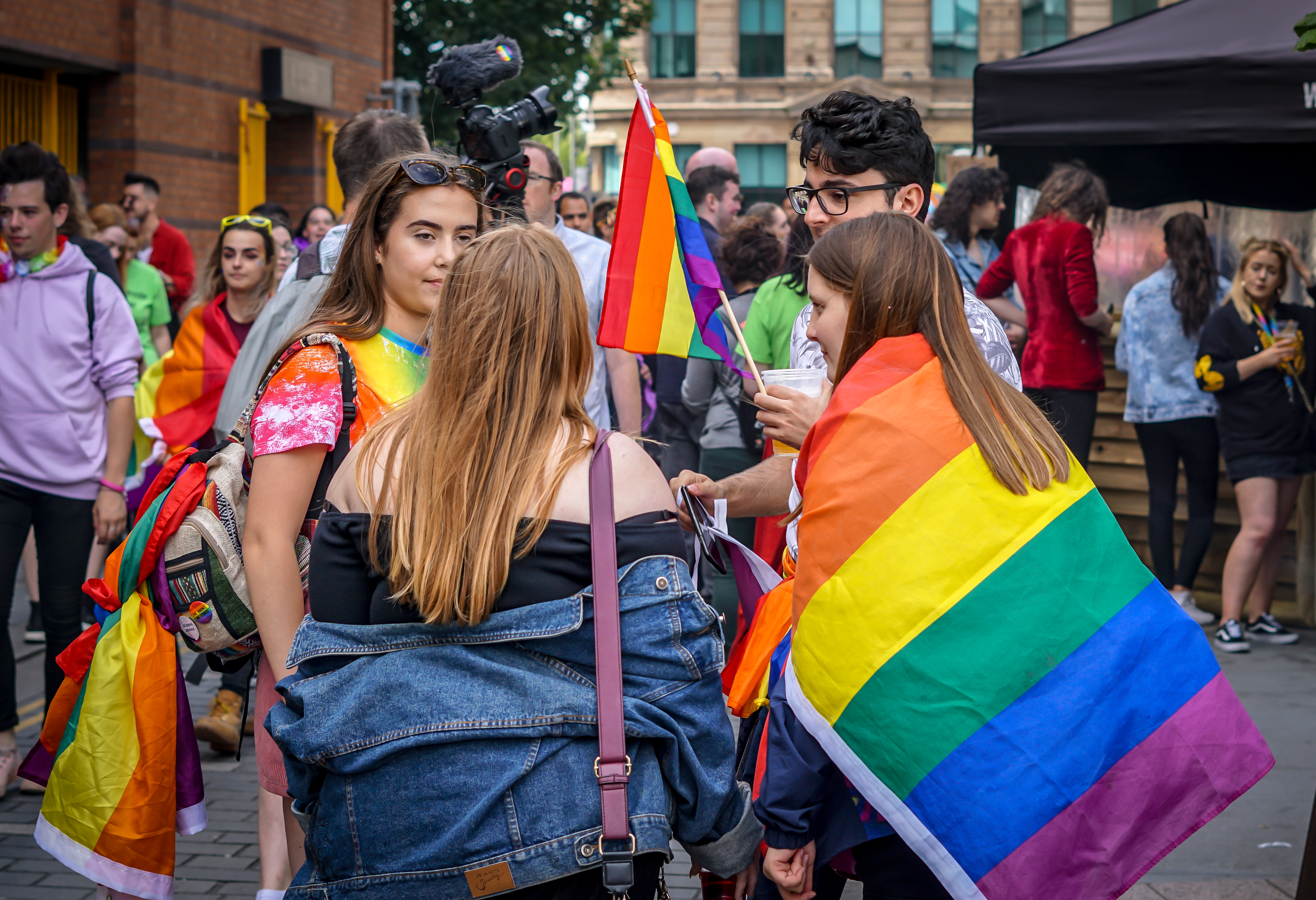
Liverpool is home to a significant LGBT population.

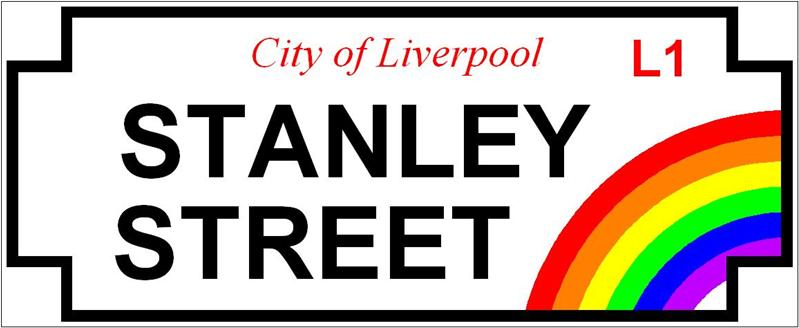
Official street signage for Stanley Street in Liverpool's Gay Quarter

Liverpool is home to a significant LGBT population, with an estimated 38,936 LGBT people living in the wider city region. Liverpool is also the first and only British city to officially recognise its gay quarter Stanley Street Quarter, installing street signs bearing the rainbow-coloured Pride flag to identify it in 2011 on Stanley Street, Cumberland Street, Temple Lane, Eberle Street and Temple Street.

Liverpool Pride was established in 2010 and draws tens of thousands each year. The city's annual Homotopia festival is run by the only lesbian, gay, bisexual, trans and queer combined arts organisation in northern England.

== London ==
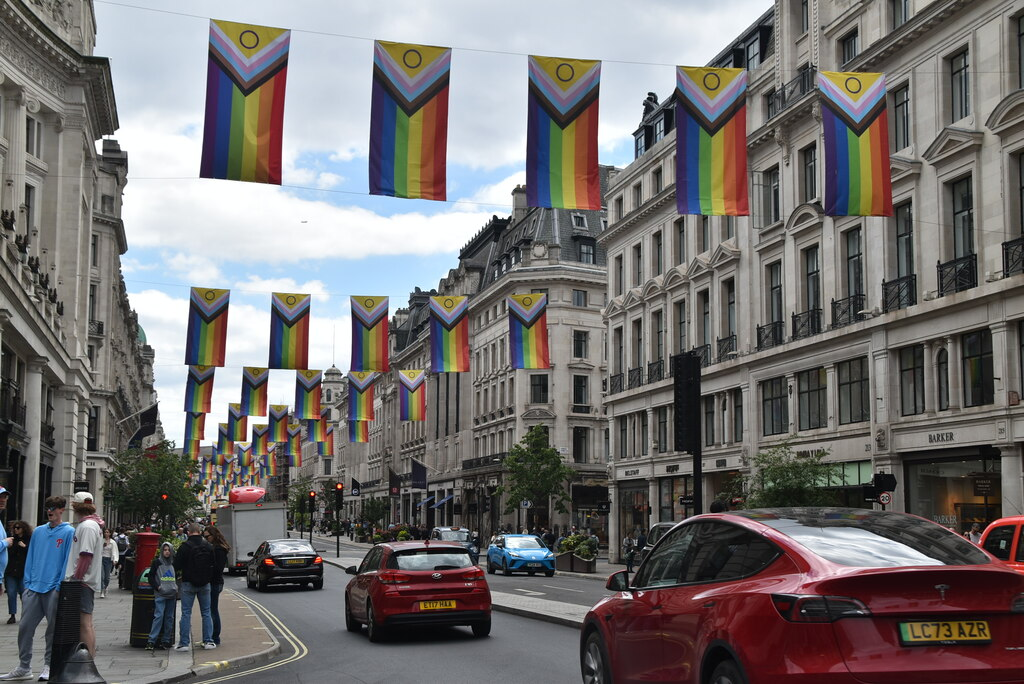
Regent Street, City of Westminster

London's LGBT community has historically been centred around Soho since the 18th century, and Old Compton Street in particular, where bars, clubs, restaurants, cafés, shops and theatres now line the streets. Vauxhall, known colloquially as Voho, is also popular, with bars, nightclubs and a sauna as well as the historic Royal Vauxhall Tavern and Above The Stag Theatre, the UK's only LGBT theatre. Recently, venues in Dalston, Shoreditch and Bethnal Green have become popular with the LGBT community. The Gay Liberation Front in the UK started in London in the 1970s, which spawned the first official UK Gay Pride Rally in the city in 1972.

London's Pride festival is now celebrated across the centre of city at the end of June, with particular focus on the main stage at Trafalgar Square and venues in Soho and Vauxhall. Pride is an annual event that closes London's Oxford Street and draws large numbers of spectators—in 2014, more than 750,000 people attended; growing to an estimated 1.5 million in 2019, making it the biggest Pride yet. London is also home to UK Black Pride.

In an Office for National Statistics survey in 2010, London was found to be home to the highest percentage of British people who identify as either gay, lesbian or bisexual than anywhere else in the UK at 2.5%.

== Manchester ==
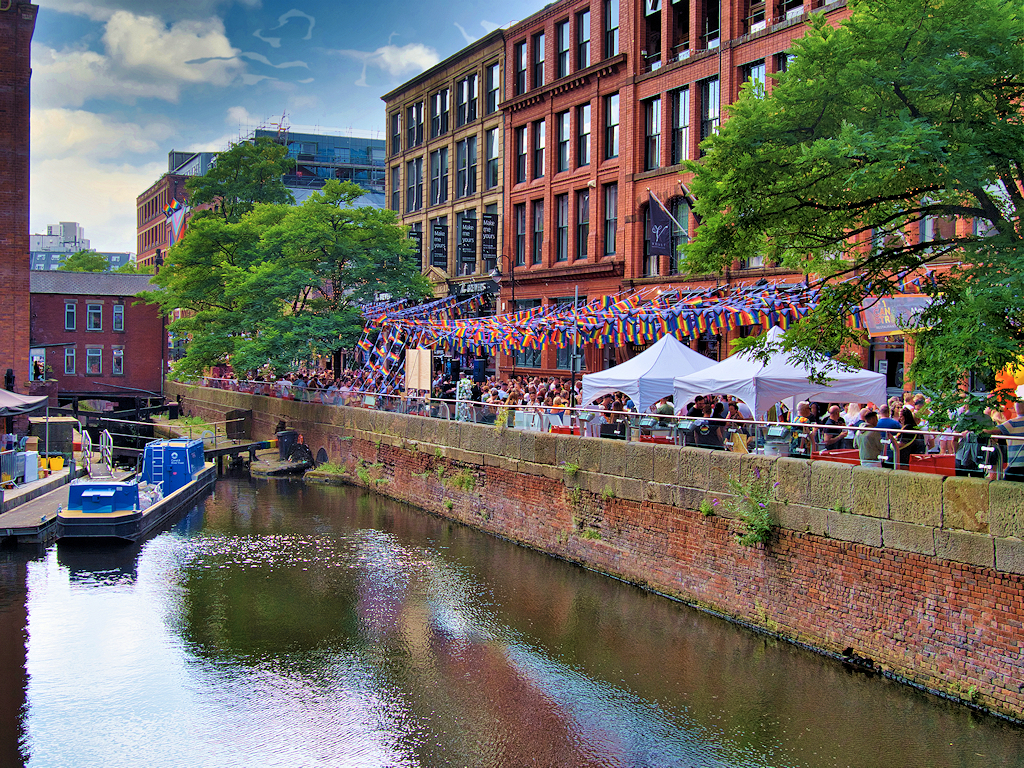
Canal Street is an LGBT destination in Manchester.

Canal Street has been the centre of Manchester's Gay Village since the 1960s. Manchester Pride, held every year in the village at the end of August, started from humble beginnings in the 1980s to achieving tens of thousands of spectators in the ensuing years. Manchester's Gay Village has been named one of the "most successful gay villages in Europe" and the "gay capital of the north," a reputation enhanced by LGBT TV shows Bob & Rose and Queer as Folk, both written by Russell T Davies, which were set there. Cucumber/Banana, also by Davies, was also set there.

The city of Manchester is estimated to be home to between 24,950 and 34,930 lesbian, gay and bisexual people. The 2021 census found a total of 14,608 gay people, 11,782 bisexual people, and 2,830 people with other non-heterosexual orientations for a total of 29,220, or 6.67% of the city's population aged over 16.

== Margate ==
Since opening its first gay bar Sundowners in 2003 and particularly since the 2010s when a number of related creatives and small businesses were drawn to the town, Margate has become notable as "England's unassuming LGBTQ+ hub". On the 2021 census, 7.09% of residents in the Cliftonville West neighbourhood were recorded as belonging to the community. Other seaside towns reported similar numbers, including Hastings, St Leonards-on-Sea, and Bournemouth. Margate Pride attracts an attendance of 15,000, with the event being described as "laidback" and "noncommercial".

== Norwich ==
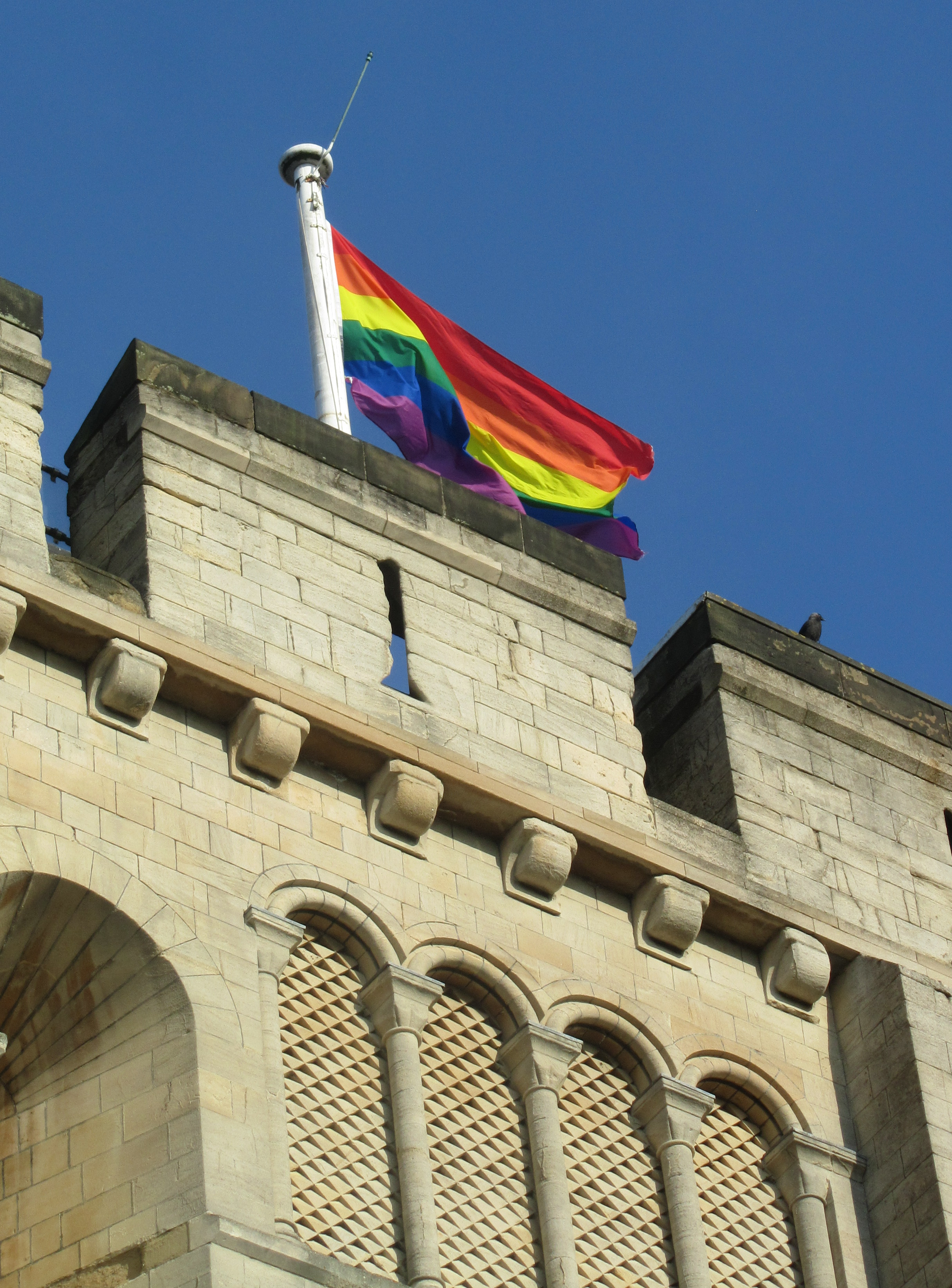
Norwich Castle in 2014

On the 2021 census, Norwich was found to be the "bisexual capital" of the UK, with the highest percentage of its population being bisexual in the country. The city's population also saw significant percentages of other LGBTQ people.

Starting in the 1960s, a number of local support groups were launched in Norwich. In 1977, journalist Keith Howes of Gay Times ran a feature on LGBTQ life in Norwich. shOUT magazine and Norwich Gay Men's Health Project produced a local guide in 1994.

The first Norwich Pride took place in 2009, with its attendance growing from 3,000 to 10,000 by 2018.

== Nottingham ==
Nottingham has an LGBT community and hosts Nottinghamshire Pride.

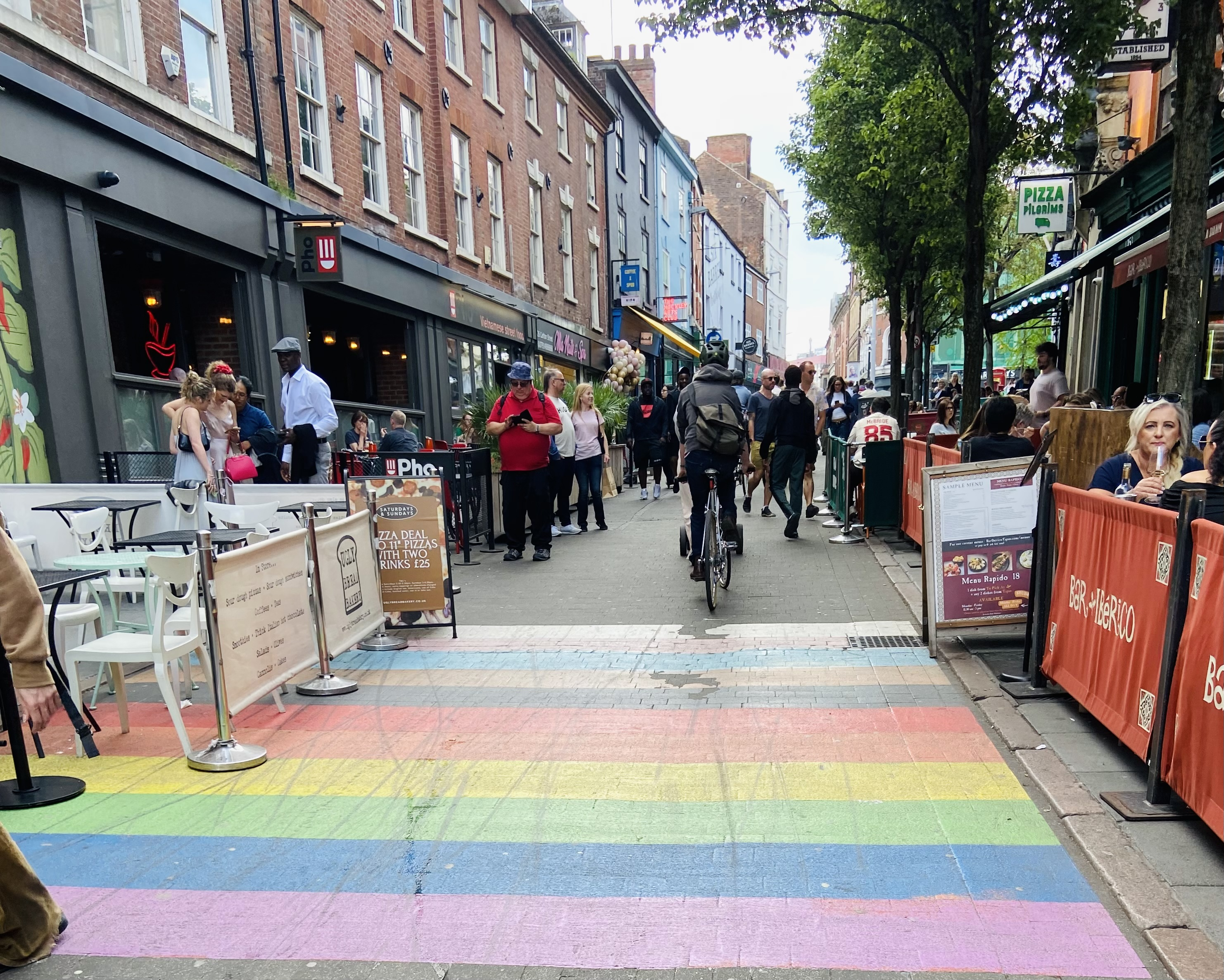
Carlton Street, Hockley

Drag performers were recorded at the Forest Tavern on Mansfield Road in the 1880s. During the mid 20th century, a number of businesses in Nottingham had LGBT+ clientele, such as the George Hotel. In the 1970s, Switchboard were based in Nottingham, while Broadmarsh shopping centre hosted two of the UK's earliest licensed LGBTQ nightclubs: Le Chic and Mario's. Hockley has been the Centre of the city's LGBTQ scene since at least the 1980s. Broadway Media Centre and the Gai Project opened in 1990 and 1994 respectively on Broad Street, where the first Nottingham Pride was held under the name Pink Lace in 1997.

== Sheffield ==
Sheffield is reportedly home to between 27,635 and 38,689 lesbian, gay and bisexual people and 3,300 trans people.

In the 1990s, Sheffield's gay scene was concentrated in Attercliffe. By the 2010s, it had moved to the city centre. In 2018, Sheffield had its first "gay quarter" established. Located on the corner of The Moor and Hereford Street in the city centre, it takes in the long-established Dempsey's bar and club and the newly opened Queer Junction. The 2018 LGBTQ+ Pride was its 10th anniversary.

== See also ==
- Gay cruising in England and Wales
- LGBT community
