= Kenwood Historic District (St. Petersburg, Florida) =

Historic district in Florida, United States

- U.S. National Register of Historic Places
- U.S. Historic district
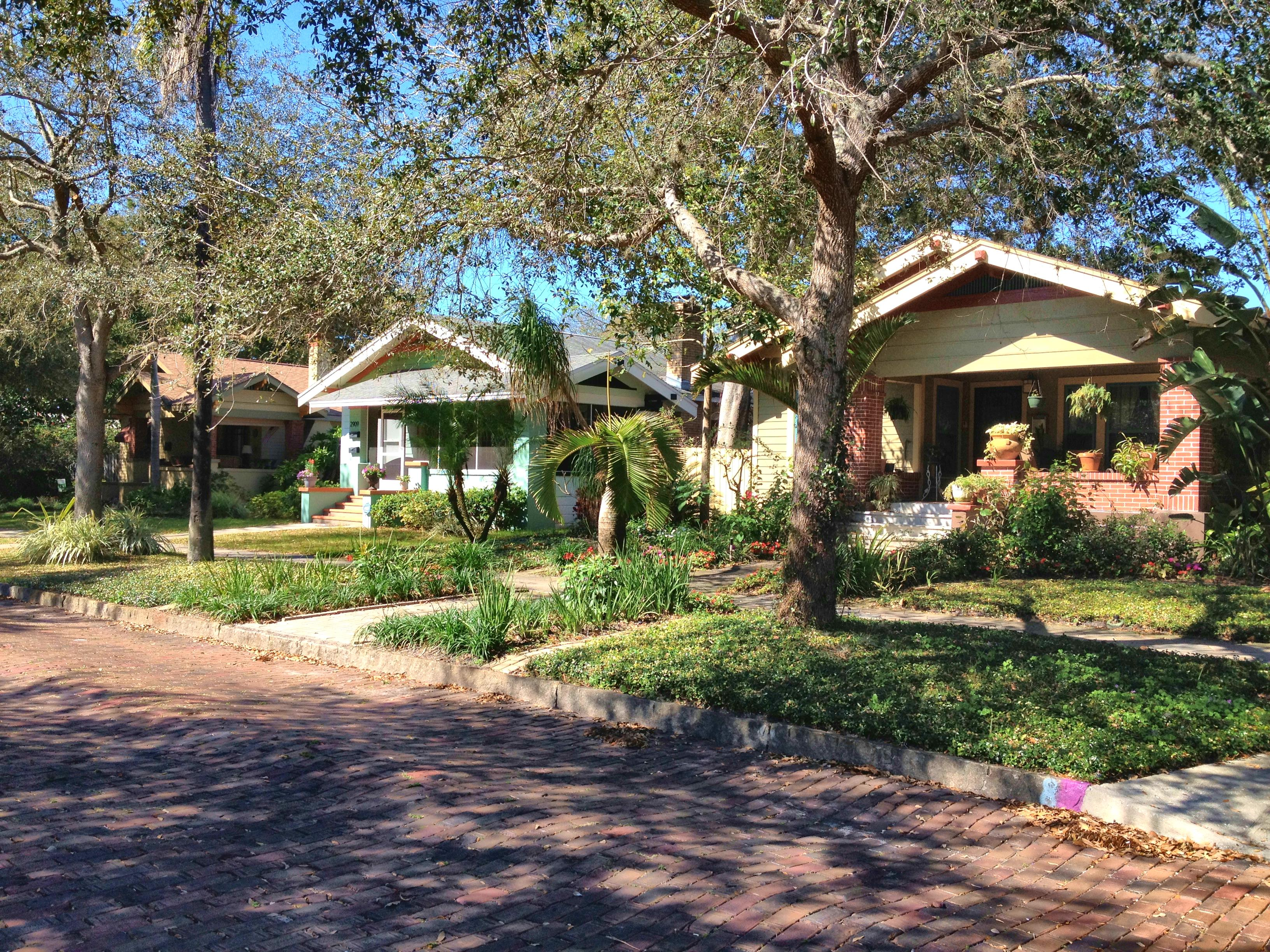

- Location within Florida Location within the United States
- Location: St. Petersburg, Florida
- Coordinates: 27°46′48″N 82°40′12″W
- Area: 3,750 acres (15.2 km^{2})
- NRHP reference No.: 03000729
- Added to NRHP: August 4, 2003

The Kenwood Historic District (also known as Historic Kenwood) is a district located in St. Petersburg, Florida U.S.A. It was designated on August 4, 2003, and is located immediately west of downtown, bounded by 9th Avenue North, 1st Avenue North, 19th Street North (adjacent to I-275) and 34th Street North. It contains 2,203 historic buildings. The Grand Central adjoins the district at its southern boundary.

The Kenwood Historic District is a 375-acre residential area best known for its historic bungalows. It consists mostly of one-story and two-story single-family homes constructed between 1912 and 1945. Historic outbuildings, such as garages and garage apartments, are also common in the neighborhood. There are a variety of residential architectural styles represented in the district, including Frame and Masonry Vernacular, Craftsman Bungalow, Minimal Traditional, Tudor Revival, Mediterranean Revival, Colonial Revival, Ranch, Prairie, American Foursquare, Dutch Colonial Revival, Mission, and International. However, while many styles are evident, bungalows constitute more than 50 per cent of the homes. Not all of these homes were built in their current locations. Many of the craftsman/bungalow-style homes were relocated to the area in the 1930s from other neighborhoods in the city, helping to cement Historic Kenwood's bungalow identity. St. Petersburg High School (1926), listed on the National Register of Historic Places, is located in the heart of Historic Kenwood along 5th Avenue North. Six churches, including two brand new churches: Reliance and The Foundry, as well as numerous commercial buildings, can be found within the district.

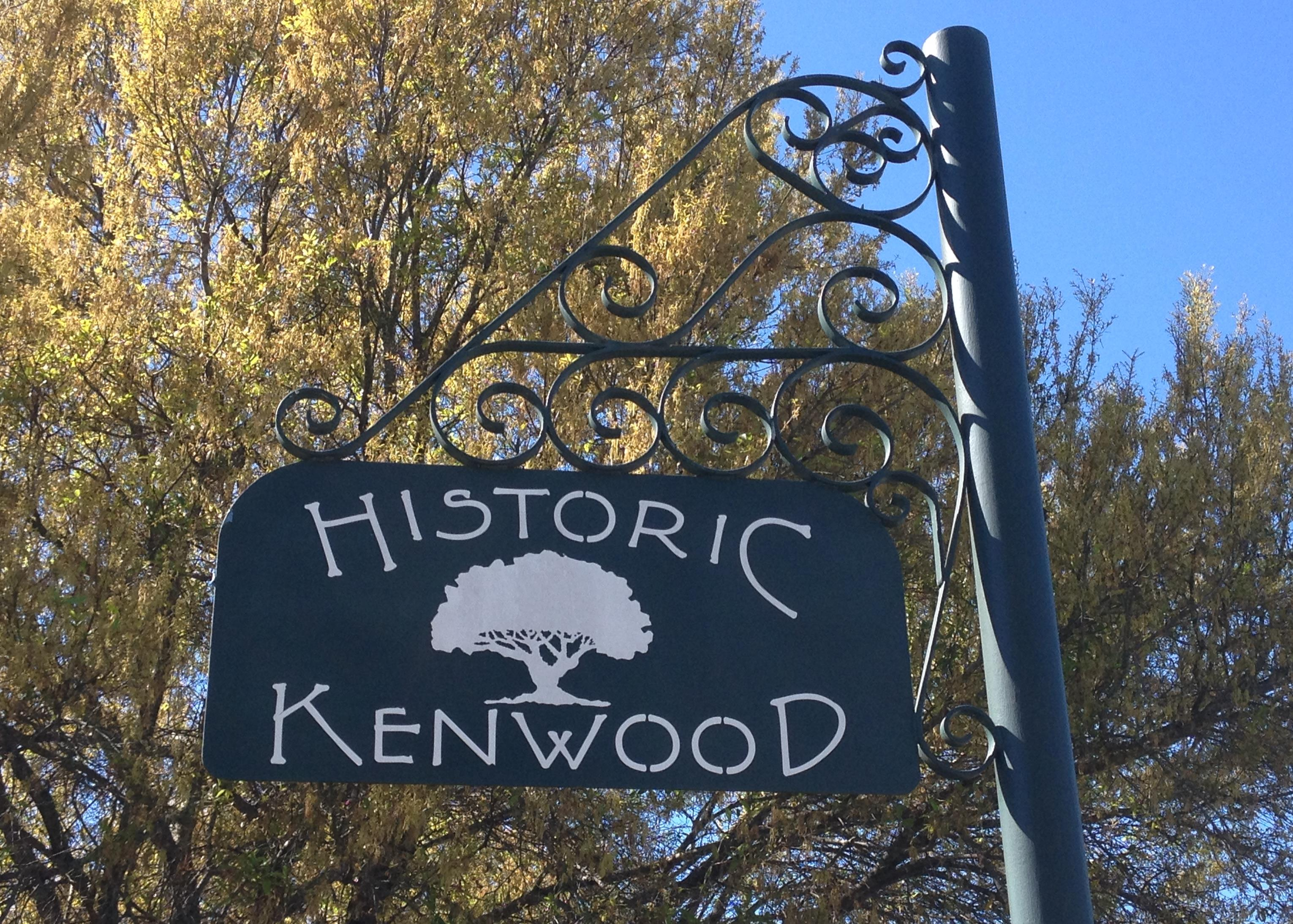
Decorative Street Sign

In addition to the large number of historic buildings remaining in the neighborhood, many of the historic landscape and streetscape elements remain. The majority of the avenues, which run in an east–west direction in the district, continue to be made of brick. Hexagonal paves can still be found comprising many of the sidewalks. The high granite curbs are also still evident along many of the streets, which are lined with large oak trees, as well as jacaranda, palms, and pine trees. Historic Kenwood is located on a plateau about 50 feet above sea level, making it much higher than other neighborhoods in the city.

Another feature of Historic Kenwood is Seminole Park. This historic park is rectangular and is bounded by 3rd Avenue North, Burlington Avenue North, 30th Street North, and 29th Street North. The park was donated by Charles R. Hall, one of the City's first developers and an initial developer of Historic Kenwood. The park features many types of trees, grassy areas, sidewalks, playground equipment, and a modern pavilion in the center constructed in the Craftsman style.

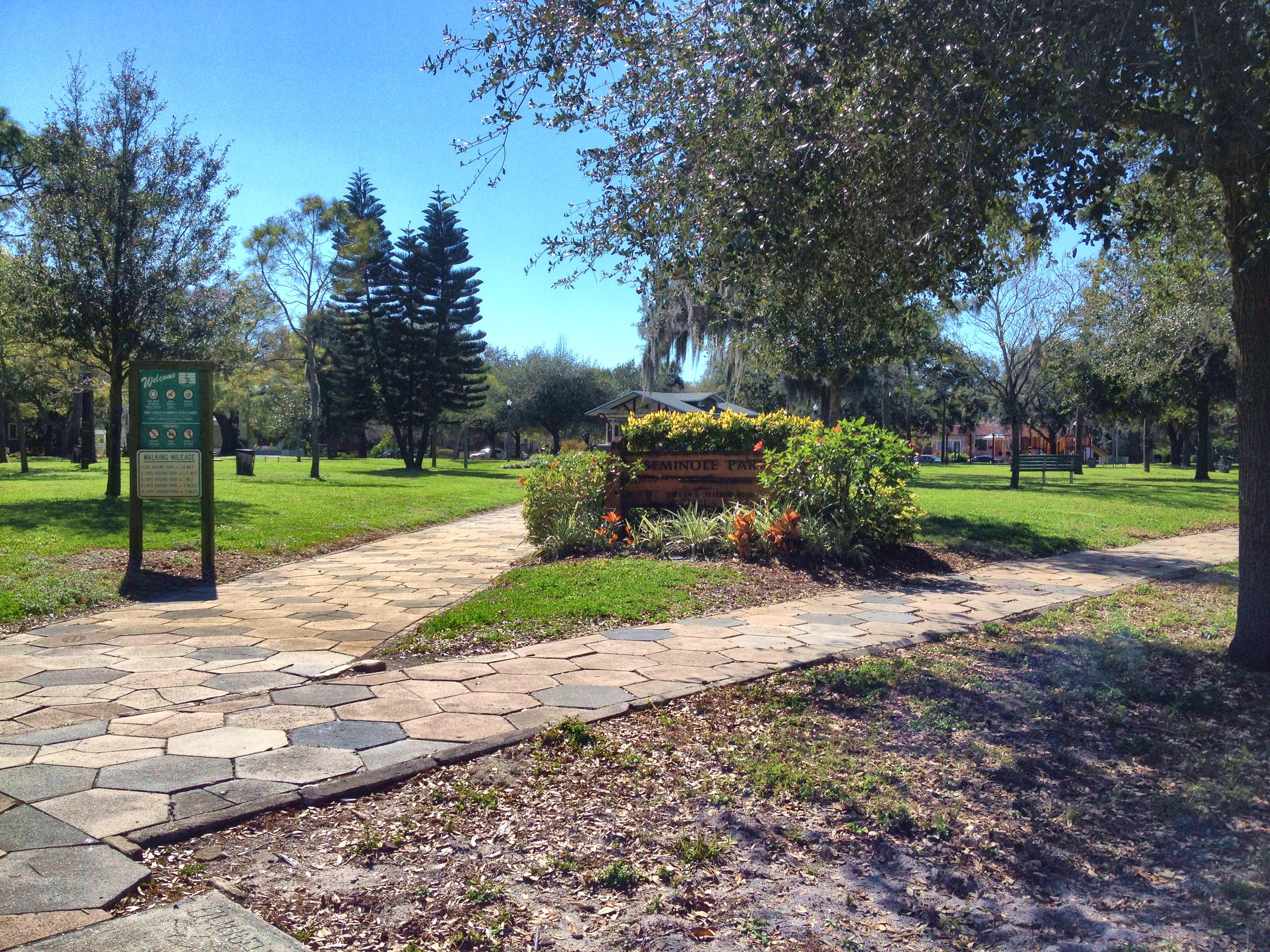
Seminole Park

== History ==
Historic Kenwood developed as a working and middle-class neighborhood in the early twentieth century. The neighborhood was one of the earliest to be developed outside of downtown. It was first platted in 1912 and developed rapidly during the Florida Land Boom of the 1920s, during which time St. Petersburg became a favorite vacation destination. While a few houses were constructed in the 1910s, development reached its peak in the 1920s, due in large part to its location just west of downtown, which could be easily accessed by automobile or streetcar. The streetcar system once ran down Central Avenue and was quite popular until finally being phased out by 1947.

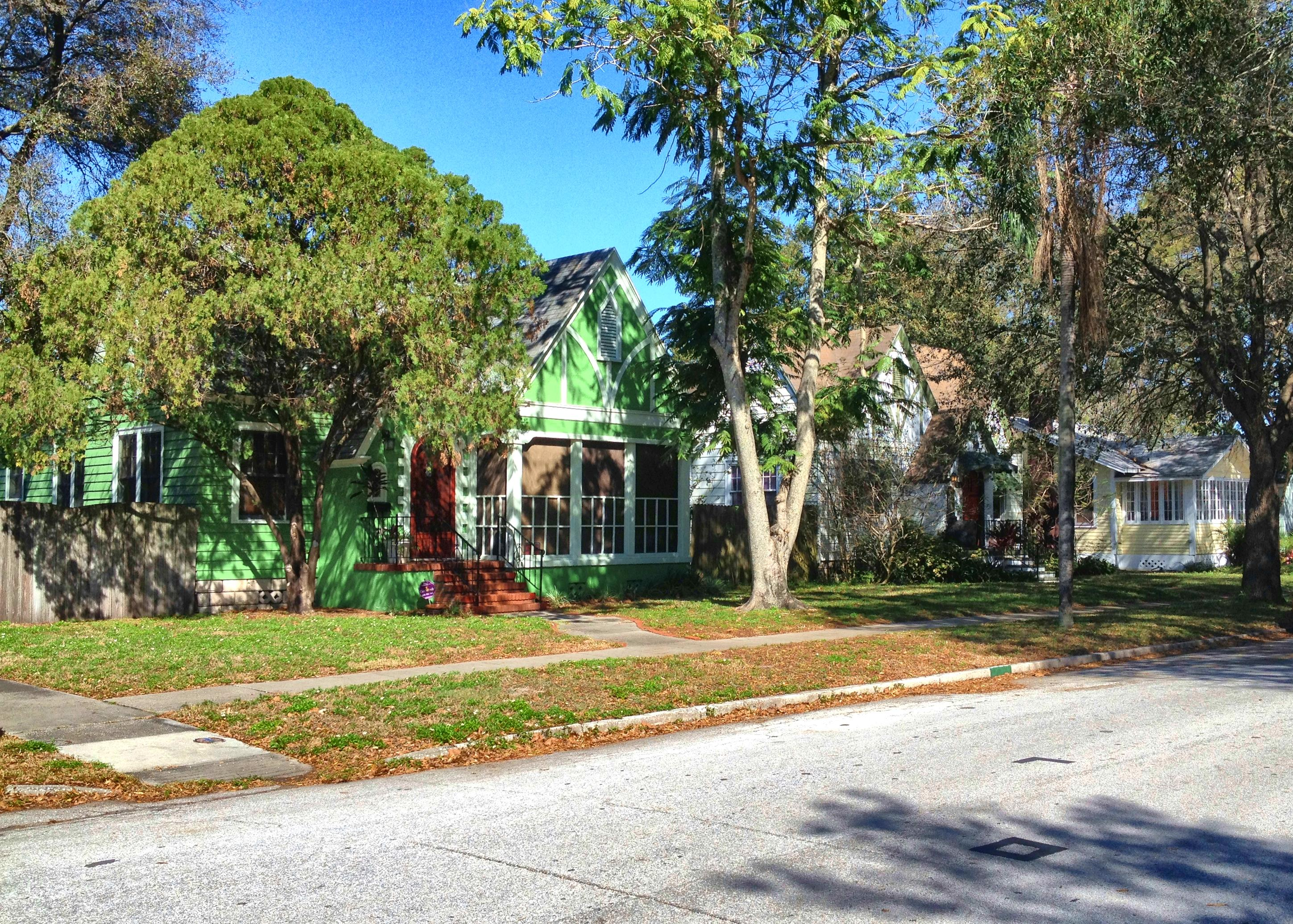
Streetscape showing historic homes within the Kenwood Historic District

=== Decline and revitalization ===
The neighborhood fell into neglect beginning in the 1950s. Interstate 275 was built in the 1970s, forming Historic Kenwood's eastern boundary. U.S. 19 (34th Street), the western boundary, became more commercial during this time. The traditional "mom and pop" businesses on the southern boundary along Central Avenue declined. Beginning in the early 1990s, urban pioneers began a neighborhood revival in both Historic Kenwood and the Grand Central District which continues today. The LGBT community in particular has played a notable role in the revitalization of the neighborhood. Many investors and homeowners were a part of the LGBT community, and have transformed the tree-lined streets into a stable, well-landscaped neighborhood with a strong civic voice. The district remains home to many gay residents and gay-friendly businesses. The annual St. Pete Pride celebration, the largest in the state, also used to take place within the district until it was moved downtown to along the waterfront in 2017. Many restorations of these historic homes and businesses have been made since the 1990s. Some of these restoration efforts include the removal of non-historic vinyl and aluminum siding, as well as the reopening of many front porches that were once enclosed. Today, events such as monthly porch parties, the annual BungalowFest, Founders' Day, and St. Pete Pride attract many to the neighborhood.
