= Grand Central, St. Petersburg, Florida =

Area of St. Petersburg, Florida, United States

Coordinates: 27.7710°N 82.6675°W

Grand Central is an arts-entertainment district in St. Petersburg, Florida, located on Central Avenue and 1st Avenue North and 1st Avenue South two miles west of Downtown. It is located within the boundaries of Kenwood Historic District, a neighborhood of St. Pete. This locale was voted among the 10 best "cottage communities" in America by Cottage Living. Many new businesses have opened in the area, with a large influx from the creative class. The area is also known as a bastion for St. Pete's LGBT community, including gay-friendly nightlife. The annual St. Pete Pride event is held here, which is the largest single-day event for the whole city as well as the largest gay pride parade in all of Florida. The event attracts tens of thousands of people to the area. Hillsborough County Commissioner Kevin Beckner, the first openly gay elected official in the region, was named grand marshal for the 2009 parade. Besides Pride, the neighborhood also hosts a weekly "Peddler's Market", similar to a more elaborate Farmers' market. Some controversy is brewing in the neighborhood regarding the marginalization of existing social services centers, and over a flag-hanging ordinance. The district is also home to Halloween on Central, St. Petersburg’s largest open air Halloween celebration. Launched in 2020, the event spans almost two miles of car free streets along Central Avenue, from 31st Street to Dr. Martin Luther King Jr. Street. Each October, more than 100,000 attendees walk, bike, and skate through the festival, which features over 150 local vendors, live music, trick-or-treat stations, food trucks, costume contests, and community activities. The event is organized in partnership with the Grand Central District, EDGE District, the City of St. Petersburg, and LocalShops1, with support from sponsors like T-Mobile and the Tampa Bay Rays.

== See also ==
- GaYbor, gay village located across the bay in Ybor City
- Gulfport, beachside town known for its colorful ambiance and culinary scene
- Old Northeast, historic neighborhood in St. Pete adjacent to Downtown to the northeast
- SoHo, entertainment district across the bay in Tampa
