= GaYbor =

Coordinates: 30.440278°N 82.291389°W

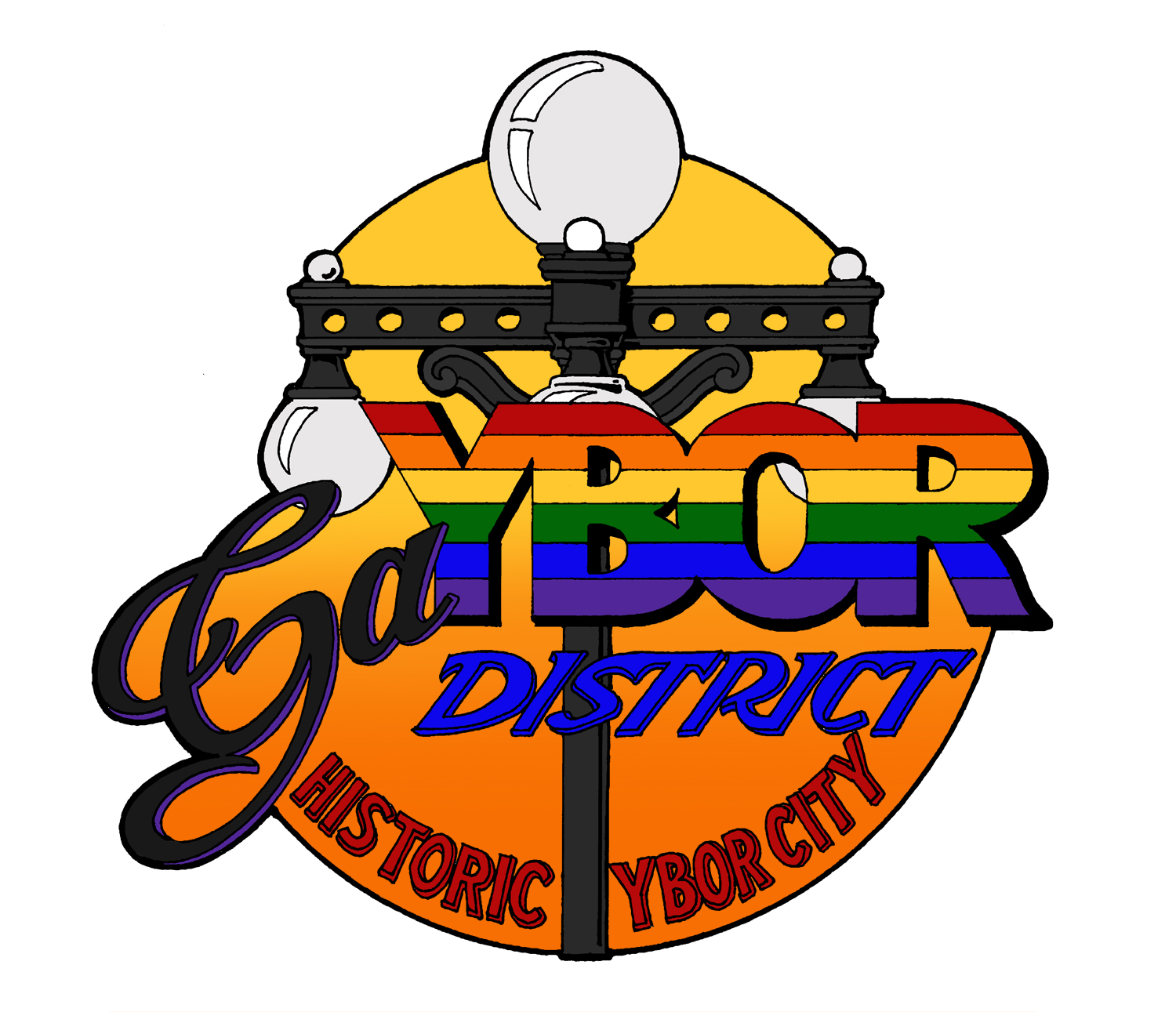
GaYBOR bead medallion circa 2010-2011

GaYBOR District Coalition in Historic Ybor City (/ˈɡeɪbɔːr/ GAY-bor) is a nonprofit 501(c)(6) organization located within Ybor City in Tampa, Florida. It is an organization of LGBT bars, nightclubs, restaurants, shops, nonprofit organizations, throughout the West Coast of Central Florida, with its headquarters in Historic Ybor City. The organization has many participants and is sponsored by both gay and straight members. The district is roughly centered on 8th Avenue and 15th Street in Ybor, with large rainbow flags & GaYBOR signs as markers. A yearly event around the 4th of July called "GaYBOR Days" is held in the district featuring celebrity appearances and street celebrations celebrating LGBT pride. Former Tampa Mayors Pam Iorio and Bob Buckhorn have met with the leaders of the group on several occasions to help with planning and issues such as police protection, including that by gay and lesbian officers.

Tampa Bay's large LGBT community is a catalyst for this neighborhood, with a study by UCLA placing Tampa at number five in the nation for LGBT citizen population with 6.1% in the city proper and 5.9% in the metro area as a whole.

== See also ==
- Grand Central, a similar district near Downtown St. Pete
