= Gateway Arch =

US National Historic Landmark in St. Louis, Missouri

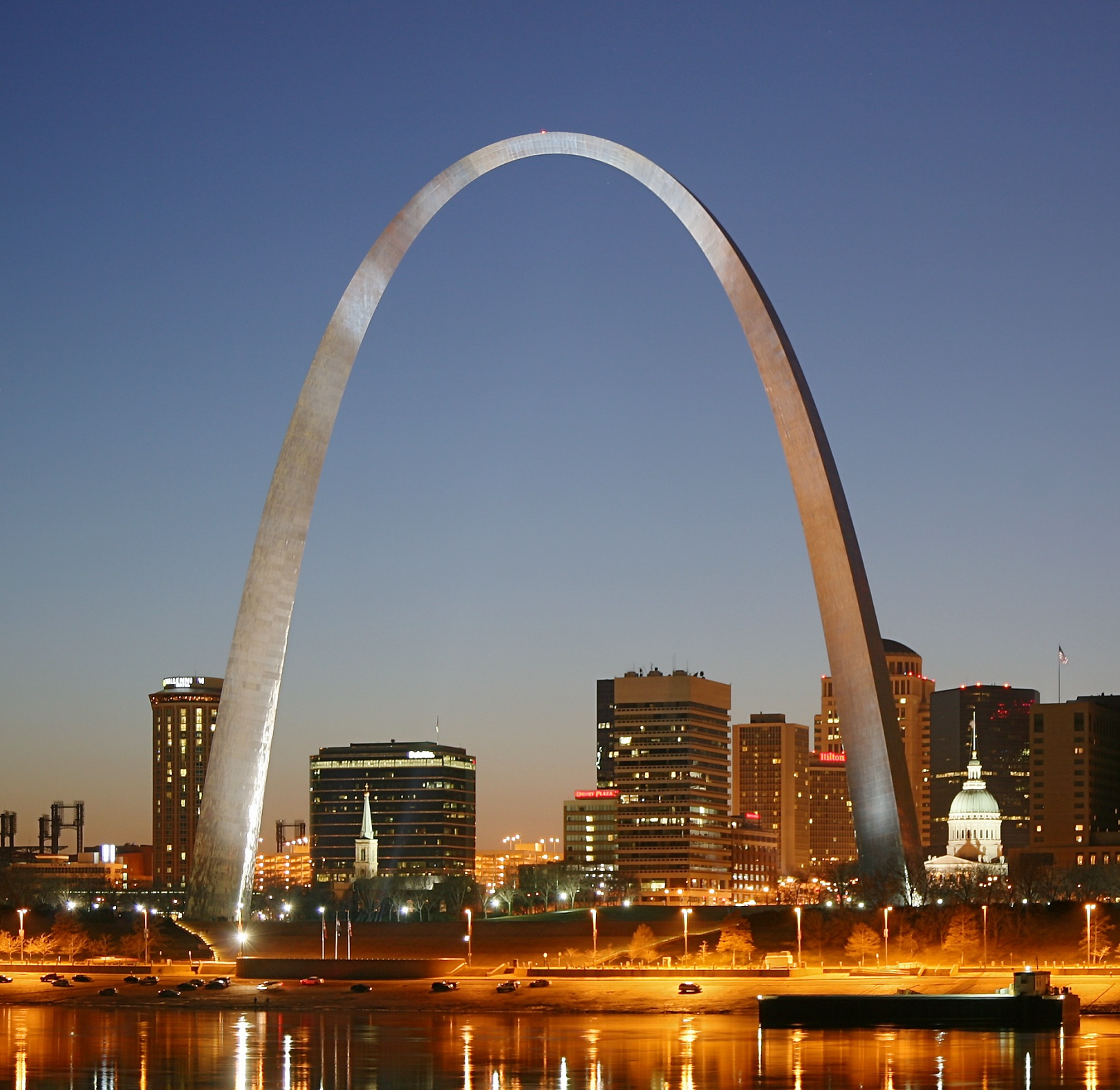
- Alternative names: Gateway to the West; St. Louis Arch

General information
- Architectural style: Structural expressionism
- Location: 100 Washington Avenue, St. Louis, Missouri 63102, United States
- Coordinates: 38.6246°N 90.1850°W
- Construction started: February 12, 1963; 63 years ago
- Completed: October 28, 1965; 61 years ago
- Inaugurated: June 10, 1967; 59 years ago
- Cost: $13 million (c. $101 million in 2025)

Height
- Height: 630 ft (192 m)

Dimensions
- Other dimensions: 630 ft (192 m) width

Design and construction
- Architect: Eero Saarinen
- Architecture firm: Eero Saarinen and Associates
- Structural engineer: Severud Associates
- Main contractor: MacDonald Construction Co.

Website
- www.gatewayarch.com
- Gateway Arch
- U.S. National Register of Historic Places
- U.S. National Historic Landmark
- Location within St. Louis Location within Missouri Location within the United States
- NRHP reference No.: 87001423

Significant dates
- Added to NRHP: May 28, 1987
- Designated NHL: May 28, 1987

The Gateway Arch is a 630-foot-tall (192 m) monument in St. Louis, Missouri, United States. Clad in stainless steel and built in the form of a weighted catenary arch, it is the world's tallest arch and Missouri's tallest accessible structure. Some sources consider it the tallest human-made monument in the Western Hemisphere. Built as a monument to the westward expansion of the United States and officially dedicated to "the American people", the Arch, commonly referred to as "The Gateway to the West", is a National Historic Landmark in Gateway Arch National Park and has become a popular tourist destination, as well as an internationally recognized symbol of St. Louis.

The Arch was designed by the Finnish-American architect Eero Saarinen in 1947. Construction began on February 12, 1963, and was completed on October 28, 1965, at an overall cost of $13 million (equivalent to $101 million in 2025). The monument opened to the public on June 10, 1967. It is located at the 1764 site of the founding of St. Louis on the west bank of the Mississippi River.

== Historical background ==
=== Inception and funding (1933–1935) ===
Around late 1933, civic leader Luther Ely Smith, returning to St. Louis from the George Rogers Clark National Historical Park in Vincennes, Indiana, saw the St. Louis riverfront area and envisioned that building a memorial there would both revive the riverfront and stimulate the economy. He communicated his idea to Mayor Bernard Dickmann, who on December 15, 1933, raised it in a meeting with city leaders. They sanctioned the proposal, and the nonprofit Jefferson National Expansion Memorial Association (JNEMA) was formed. Smith was appointed chairman and Dickmann vice chairman. The association's goal was to create:

A suitable and permanent public memorial to the men who made possible the western territorial expansion of the United States, particularly President Jefferson, his aides Livingston and Monroe, the great explorers, Lewis and Clark, and the hardy hunters, trappers, frontiersmen and pioneers who contributed to the territorial expansion and development of these United States, and thereby to bring before the public of this and future generations the history of our development and induce familiarity with the patriotic accomplishments of these great builders of our country.

Many locals did not approve of depleting public funds for the cause. Smith's daughter SaLees related that when "people would tell him we needed more practical things", he would respond that "spiritual things" were equally important.

The association expected that $30 million would be needed to undertake the construction of such a monument (about $592 million in 2025 dollars). It called upon the federal government to foot three-quarters of the bill ($22.5 million).

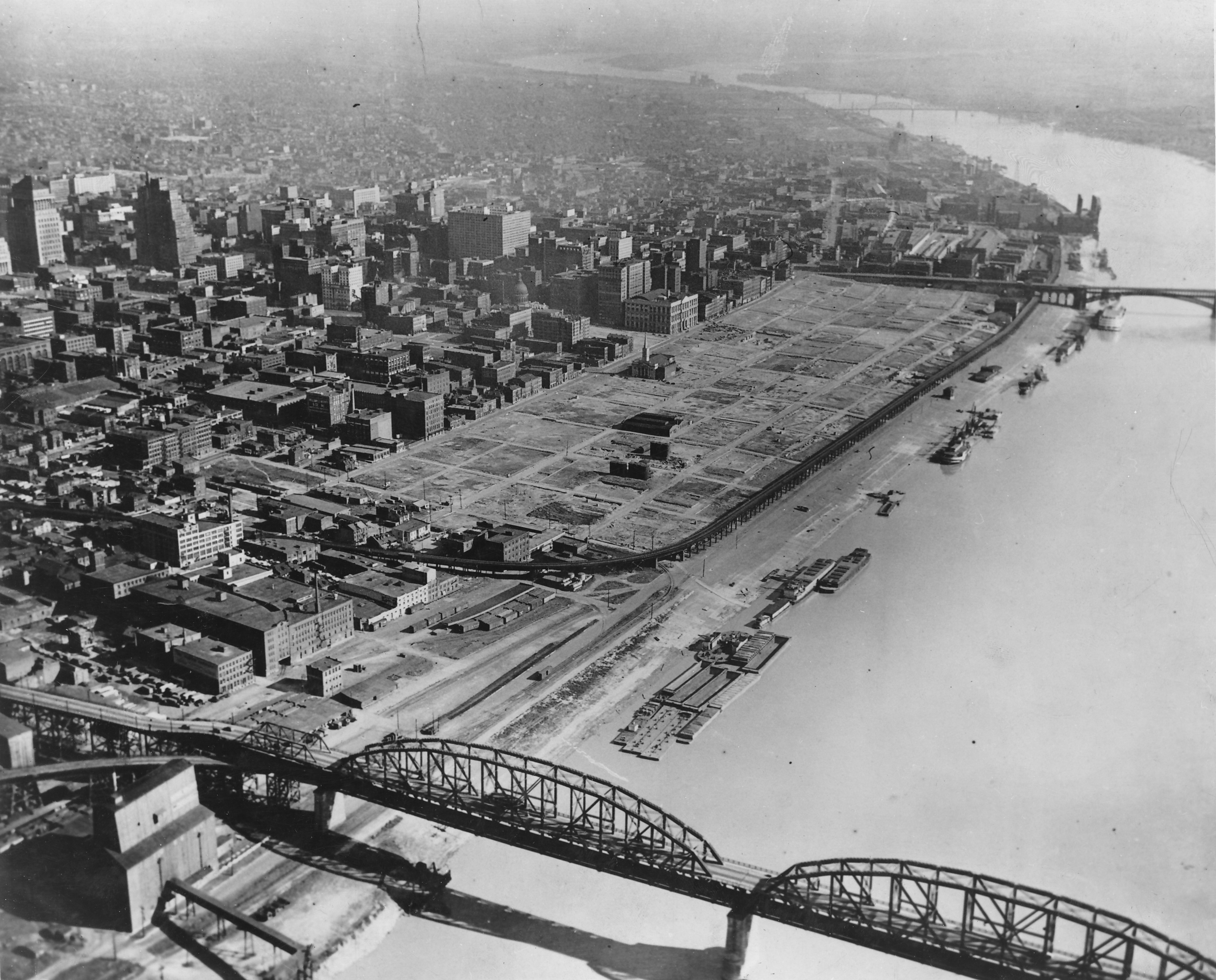
The St. Louis riverfront after demolition

The suggestion to renew the riverfront was not original, as previous projects were attempted but lacked popularity. The Jefferson memorial idea emerged amid the economic disarray of the Great Depression and promised new jobs. The project was expected to create 5,000 jobs for three to four years. Committee members began to raise public awareness by organizing fundraisers and writing pamphlets. They also engaged Congress by planning budgets and preparing bills, in addition to researching ownership of the land they had chosen, "approximately one-half mile in length ... from Third Street east to the present elevated railroad." In January 1934, Senator Bennett Champ Clark and Representative John Cochran introduced to Congress an appropriation bill seeking $30 million for the memorial, but the bill failed to garner support due to the large amount of money solicited. In March of the same year, joint resolutions proposed the establishment of a federal commission to develop the memorial. Although the proposal aimed for only authorization, the bill incurred opposition because people suspected that JNEMA would later seek appropriation. On March 28 the Senate bill was reported out, and on April 5 it was turned over to the House Library Committee, which later reported favorably on the bills. On June 8, both the Senate and House bills were passed. On June 15, President Franklin D. Roosevelt signed the bill into law, instituting the United States Territorial Expansion Memorial Commission. The commission comprised 15 members, chosen by Roosevelt, the House, the Senate, and JNEMA. It first convened on December 19 in St. Louis, where members examined the project and its planned location.

Meanwhile, in December, the JNEMA discussed organizing an architectural competition to determine the design of the monument. Local architect Louis LaBeaume had drawn up competition guidelines by January 1935. On April 13, 1935, the commission certified JNEMA's project proposals, including memorial perimeters, the "historical significance" of the memorial, the competition, and the $30 million budget. Between February and April, the Missouri State Legislature passed an act allowing the use of bonds to facilitate the project. On April 15, then Governor Guy B. Park signed it into law. Dickmann and Smith applied for funding from two New Deal agencies—the Public Works Administration (headed by Harold Ickes) and the Works Progress Administration (headed by Harry Hopkins). On August 7, both Ickes and Hopkins assented to the funding requests, each promising $10 million, and said that the National Park Service (NPS) would manage the memorial. A local bond issue election granting $7.5 million (about $148 million in 2025 dollars) for the memorial's development was held on September 10 and passed.

On December 21, President Roosevelt signed Executive Order 7253 to approve the memorial, allocating the 82-acre area as the first National Historic Site. The order also appropriated $3.3 million through the WPA and $3.45 million through the PWA ($6.75 million in total). The motivation of the project was two-fold—commemorating westward expansion and creating jobs. Some taxpayers began to file suits to block the construction of the monument, which they called a "boondoggle".

=== Initial planning (1936–1939) ===
Using the 1935 grant of $6.75 million and $2.25 million in city bonds, the NPS acquired the historic buildings within the historic site—through condemnation rather than purchase—and demolished them. By September 1938, condemnation was complete. The condemnation was subject to many legal disputes which culminated on January 27, 1939, when the United States Circuit Court of Appeals ruled that condemnation was valid. A total of $6.2 million was distributed to land owners on June 14. Demolition commenced on October 9, 1939, when Dickmann extracted three bricks from a vacant warehouse.

Led by Paul Peters, adversaries of the memorial delivered to Congress a leaflet titled "Public Necessity or Just Plain Pork". The JNEMA's lawyer, Bon Geaslin, believed that the flyers did not taint the project, but motivated members of Congress to find out more about the same. Although Representative John Cochran wanted to ask Congress to approve more funds, Geaslin believed the association should "keep a low profile, maintaining its current position during this session of Congress". He advised the association to "get a good strong editorial in one of the papers to the effect that a small group of tenants ... is soliciting funds [to fight] the proposed improvement, and stating that these efforts do not represent the consensus of opinion in St. Louis ... , and pointing out that such obstructions should be condemned".

Congress's reduction in spending made it impossible for the allocated funds to be obtained. NPS responded that the city would reduce its contribution if the federal government did. It also asserted that the funds were sanctioned by an executive order, but superintendent John Nagle pointed out that what "one Executive Order does, another can undo". In March 1936, Representative Cochran commented during a House meeting that he "would not vote for any measure providing for building the memorial or allotting funds to it". Geaslin found Cochran's statements to be a greater hindrance to the project than Paul Peters' opposition, for Congress might have Cochran's opinions as representative of public opinion.

Peters and other opponents asked Roosevelt to rescind Executive Order 7253 and to redirect the money to the American Red Cross. Smith impugned their motives, accusing them of being "opposed to anything that is ever advanced in behalf of the city." In February 1936, an editorial written by Paul W. Ward in The Nation denounced the project. Smith was infuriated, fearing the impact of attacks from a prestigious magazine, and wanted "to jump on it strong with hammer and tongs". William Allen White, a renowned newspaper editor, advised Smith not to fret.

Because the Mississippi River played an essential role in establishing St. Louis's identity as the gateway to the west, it was felt that a memorial commemorating it should be near the river. Railroad tracks that had been constructed in the 1930s on the levee obstructed views of the riverfront from the memorial site. When Ickes declared that the railway must be removed before he would allocate funds for the memorial, President of the St. Louis Board of Public Service Baxter Brown suggested that "a new tunnel ... conceal the relocated tracks and re-grading of the site to elevate it over the tunnel. These modifications would eliminate the elevated and surface tracks and open up the views to the river." Although rejected by NPS architect Charles Peterson, Brown's proposal formed the basis for the ultimate settlement.

By May 1942, demolition was complete. The Old Cathedral and the Old Rock House, because of their historical significance, were the only buildings retained within the historic site. The Old Rock House was later dismantled in 1959 with the intention of reassembling it at a new location, but pieces of the building went missing. Part of the house has been reconstructed in the basement of the Old Courthouse.

=== Design competition (1945–1948) ===
... [T]he steel monument one sees today—carbon steel on the interior, stainless steel on the exterior, and concrete in-filling, with an equilateral-triangle-shaped section that tapers from 54 to 17 feet at the top, and the concept of a skin that is also structure—is in essence [Saarinen's] competition design.

— Eero Saarinen: Shaping the Future, 2006

In November 1944, Smith discussed with Newton Drury, the National Park Service Director, the design of the memorial, asserting that the memorial should be "transcending in spiritual and aesthetic values", best represented by "one central feature: a single shaft, a building, an arch, or something else that would symbolize American culture and civilization."

The idea of an architectural competition to determine the design of the memorial was favored at the JNEMA's inaugural meeting. They planned to award cash for the best design. In January 1945, the JNEMA officially announced a two-stage design competition that would cost $225,000 to organize. Smith and the JNEMA struggled to raise the funds, garnering only a third of the required total by June 1945. (Note: Once he revisited a generous sponsor, requesting more money: "Now you have to protect your investment".) Then mayor Aloys Kaufmann feared that the lack of public support would lead officials to abandon hope in the project. The passage of a year brought little success, and Smith frantically underwrote the remaining $40,000 in May 1946. By June, Smith found others to assume portions of his underwriting, with $17,000 remaining under his sponsorship. In February 1947, the underwriters were compensated, and the fund stood at over $231,199.

Local architect Louis LaBeaume prepared a set of specifications for the design, and architect George Howe was chosen to coordinate the competition. On May 30, 1947, the contest officially opened. The seven-member jury that would judge the designs comprised Charles Nagel Jr., Richard Neutra, Roland Wank, William Wurster, LaBeaume, Fiske Kimball, and S. Herbert Hare. The competition comprised two stages—the first to narrow down the designers to five and the second to single out one architect and his design. The design intended to include:

(a) an architectural memorial or memorials to Jefferson; dealing (b) with preservation of the site of Old St. Louis—landscaping, provision of an open-air campfire theater, reerection or reproduction of a few typical old buildings, provision of a Museum interpreting the Westward movement; (c) a living memorial to Jefferson's 'vision of greater opportunities for men of all races and creeds;' (d) recreational facilities, both sides of the river; and (e) parking facilities, access, relocation of railroads, placement of an interstate highway.

Saarinen working with a model of the arch in 1957

The team included Eero Saarinen as designer, J. Henderson Barr as associate designer, and Dan Kiley as landscape architect, as well as Lily Swann Saarinen as sculptor and Alexander Girard as painter. In the first stage of the competition, Carl Milles advised Saarinen to change the bases of each leg to triangles instead of squares. Saarinen said that he "worked at first with mathematical shapes, but finally adjusted it according to the eye." At submission, Saarinen's plans laid out the arch at 569 feet (173 m) tall and 592 feet (180 m) wide from center to center of the triangle bases.

On September 1, 1947, submissions for the first stage were received by the jury. The submissions were labeled by numbers only, and the names of the designers were kept anonymous. Upon four days of deliberation, the jury narrowed down the 172 submissions, which included Saarinen's father Eliel, to five finalists, and announced the corresponding numbers to the media on September 27. Eero Saarinen's design (#144) was among the finalists, and comments written on it included "relevant, beautiful, perhaps inspired would be the right word" (Roland Wank) and "an abstract form peculiarly happy in its symbolism" (Charles Nagel). Hare questioned the feasibility of the design but appreciated the thoughtfulness behind it. Local St. Louis architect Harris Armstrong was also one of the finalists. The secretary who sent out the telegrams informing finalists of their advancement mistakenly sent one to Eliel rather than Eero. The family celebrated with champagne, and two hours later, a competition representative called to correct the mistake. Eliel "'broke out a second bottle of champagne' to toast his son." They proceeded to the second stage, and each was given a $10,069 prize (about $113,820 in 2025 dollars). Saarinen changed the height of the arch from 580 feet to 630 feet (190 m) (Note: He would also change the width of the arch to match its height.) and wrote that the arch symbolized "the gateway to the West, the national expansion, and whatnot." He wanted the landscape surrounding the arch to "be so densely covered with trees that it will be a forest-like park, a green retreat from the tension of the downtown city", according to The New York Times architectural critic Aline Bernstein Louchheim. (Note: In 1954, Louchheim married Saarinen.) The deadline for the second stage arrived on February 10, 1948, and on February 18, the jury chose Saarinen's design unanimously, praising its "profoundly evocative and truly monumental expression." The following day, during a formal dinner at Statler Hotel that the finalists and the media attended, Wurster pronounced Saarinen the winner of the competition and awarded the checks—$40,000 to his team and $50,000 to Saarinen. The competition was the first major architectural design that Saarinen developed unaided by his father.

On May 25, the United States Territorial Expansion Memorial Commission endorsed the design. Later, in June, the NPS approved the proposal. Representative H. R. Gross, however, opposed the allocation of federal funds for the arch's development.

The design drew varied responses. In a February 29, 1948, The New York Times article, Louchheim praised the arch's design as "a modern monument, fitting, beautiful and impressive." Some local residents likened it to a "stupendous hairpin and a stainless steel hitching post." The most aggressive criticism emerged from Gilmore D. Clarke, whose February 26, 1948, letter compared Saarinen's arch to one imagined by fascist Benito Mussolini for the canceled 1942 World Expo in Rome, rendering the arch a fascist symbol. This allegation of plagiarism ignited fierce debates among architects about its validity. Douglas Haskell from New York wrote that "The use of a common form is not plagiarism ... this particular accusation amounts to the filthiest smear that has been attempted by a man highly placed in the architectural profession in our generation." Wurster and the jury refuted the charges, arguing that "the arch form was not inherently fascist but was indeed part of the entire history of architecture." Saarinen considered the opposition absurd, asserting, "It's just preposterous to think that a basic form, based on a completely natural figure, should have any ideological connection."

By January 1951, Saarinen created 21 "drawings, including profiles of the Arch, scale drawings of the museums and restaurants, various parking proposals, the effect of the levee-tunnel railroad plan on the Arch footings, the Arch foundations, the Third Street Expressway, and the internal and external structure of the Arch." Fred Severud made calculations for the arch's structure.

=== Railroad agreement (1949–1958) ===
Several proposals were offered for moving the railroad tracks, including:

- Bates-Ross. Tracks would cross the memorial site diagonally in a tunnel.
- Bowen. Similar to Bates-Ross proposal.
- Hill-Tunnel. Supported by Saarinen and NPS engineer Julian Spotts, it would route the tracks in a tunnel below Second and First Streets. Saarinen further said that if the tracks passed between the memorial and the river, he would withdraw his participation.
- LaBeaume-Terminal. Opposed by Saarinen and the NPS, it would lay "three tracks on a contained fill along the lines of the elevated tracks."
- Levee-Tunnel. Proposed by Frank J. McDevitt, president of the St. Louis Board of Public Service, it would lower the tracks into a tunnel concealed by walls and landscaping.

On July 7, 1949, in Mayor Joseph Darst's office, city officials chose the Levee-Tunnel plan, rousing JNEMA members who held that the decision had been pressed through when Smith was away on vacation. Darst notified Secretary of the Interior Julius Krug of the city's selection. Krug planned to meet with Smith and JNEMA but canceled the meeting and resigned on November 11. His successor, Oscar L. Chapman, rescheduled the meeting for December 5 in Washington with delegates from the city government, JNEMA, railroad officials, and Federal government. A day after the conference, they ratified a memorandum of understanding about the plan: "The five tracks on the levee would be replaced by three tracks, one owned by the Missouri Pacific Railroad (MPR) and two by the Terminal Railroad Association of St. Louis (TRRA) proceeding through a tunnel not longer than 3,000 feet. The tunnel would be approximately fifty feet west of the current elevated line." It would also have an overhead clearance of 18 feet (5.5 m), lower than the regular requirement of 22 feet (6.7 m). Chapman approved the document on December 22, 1949, and JNEMA garnered the approval of the Missouri Public Service Commission on August 7, 1952.

Efforts to appropriate congressional funds began in January 1950 but were delayed until 1953 by the Korean War's depletion of federal funds.

In August 1953, Secretary of the Interior Fred A. Seaton declared that the Department of the Interior and the railroads should finalize the agreement on the new route. In October, NPS and the TRRA decided that the TRRA would employ a surveyor endorsed by Spotts "to survey, design, estimate, and report on" the expenses of shifting the tracks. They chose Alfred Benesch and Associates, which released its final report on May 3, 1957. The firm estimated that the two proposals would cost more than expected: more than $11 million and $14 million, respectively. NPS director Conrad Wirth enjoined Saarinen to make small modifications to the design. In October, Saarinen redrafted the plans, suggesting:

[the placement of] the five sets of railroad tracks into a shortened tunnel 100 feet west of the trestle, with the tracks being lowered sixteen feet. This did not mean that the memorial would be cut off from the river, however, for Saarinen provided a 960-foot-long (290 m) tunnel to be placed over the railroad where a "grand staircase" rose from the levee to the Arch. At the north and south ends of the park, 150-foot tunnels spanned the tracks, and led to the overlook museum, restaurant, and stairways down to the levee. Saarinen designed a subterranean visitor center the length of the distance between the legs, to include two theaters and an entrance by inward-sloping ramps.

On November 29, involved interests signed another memorandum of understanding approving Saarinen's rework; implementing it would cost about $5.053 million. On March 10, 1959, mayor Raymond Tucker proposed that they drop "the tunnel idea in favor of open cuts roofed with concrete slabs , which would cost $2.684 million, $1.5 million less than the cost of the approved plan. On May 12, 1958, Tucker, TRRA president Armstrong Chinn, and Missouri Pacific Railroad president Russell Dearmont entered a written agreement: "The TRRA would place $500,000 in escrow for the project, and the city [would] sell $980,000 of the 1935 bonds to match the Federal contribution." Director Wirth and Secretary Seaton approved the plan on June 2.

In July 1953, Representative Leonor Sullivan introduced H.R. 6549, a bill authorizing the allocation of no more than $5 million to build the arch. After much negotiation, both houses of Congress approved the bill in May 1954, and on May 18, 1954, President Dwight D. Eisenhower signed the bill into law as Public Law 361. Congress could not afford to appropriate the funds in 1955, so association president William Crowdus resorted to asking the Rockefeller and Ford Foundations for $10 million. The foundations denied the request because their function as private foundations did not include funding national memorials. In 1956, Congress appropriated $2.64 million to be used to move the railroad tracks. The remainder of the authorized appropriation was requested via six congressional bills, introduced on July 1, 1958, that revised Public Law 361 to encompass the cost of the entire memorial, increasing federal funds by $12.25 million. A month later the Department of the Interior and the Bureau of the Budget endorsed the bill, and both houses of Congress unanimously passed the bill. Eisenhower signed it into law on September 7. The NPS held off on appropriating the additional funds, as it planned to use the already-appropriated funds to initiate the railroad work.

=== Final preparations (1959–1968) ===
3D model of the Arch

Saarinen and city functionaries collaborated to zone buildings near the arch. In April 1959, real estate developer Lewis Kitchen decided to construct two 40-level edifices across from the arch. In July, after the plan was condemned for its potential obstruction of the arch, Kitchen discussed the issue with officials. A decision was delayed for several months because Saarinen had yet to designate the arch's height, projected between 590 and 630 feet (180 and 190 m). By October, Mayor Tucker and Director Wirth resolved to restrict the height of buildings opposite the arch to 275 feet (84 m) (about 27 levels), and the city stated that plans for buildings opposite the arch would require its endorsement. Kitchen then decreased the height of his buildings, while Saarinen increased that of the arch.

Moving the railroad tracks was the first stage of the project. On May 6, 1959, after an official conference, the Public Service Commission called for ventilation to accompany the tunnel's construction, which entailed "placing 3,000 feet of dual tracks into a tunnel 105 feet west of the elevated railroad, along with filling, grading, and trestle work." Eight bids for the work were reviewed on June 8 in the Old Courthouse, and the MacDonald Construction Co. of St. Louis won with a bid of $2,426,115, less than NPS's estimate of the cost. At 10:30 a.m. on June 23, 1959, the groundbreaking ceremony occurred; Tucker spaded the first portion of earth. Wirth and Dickmann delivered speeches.

The NPS acquired the $500,000 in escrow and transferred it to MacDonald to begin building the new tracks. In August, demolition of the Old Rock House (Note: Built in 1818 by Manuel Lisa, it was St. Louis' oldest standing building when Roosevelt approved the memorial in 1935.) was complete, with workers beginning to excavate the tunnel. In November, they began shaping the tunnel's walls with concrete. Twenty-nine percent of the construction was completed by March and 95% by November. On November 17, trains began to use the new tracks. June 1962 was the projected date of fruition.

On May 16, 1959, the Senate appropriations subcommittee received from St. Louis legislators a request for $2.4911 million, of which it granted only $133,000. Wirth recommended that they reseek the funds in January 1960.

On March 10, 1959, Regional Director Howard Baker received $888,000 as the city's first subsidy for the project. On December 1, 1961, $23,003,150 in total had been authorized, with $19,657,483 already appropriated—$3,345,667 remained not yet appropriated.

== Construction ==
The bidding date, originally December 20, 1961, was postponed to January 22, 1962, to clarify the details of the arch construction. (Note: This deferral delayed the construction's ultimate completion, which had been slated for St. Louis' bicentennial.) About 50 companies that had requested the construction requirements received bidding invitations. Extending from $11,923,163 to $12,765,078, all four bids exceeded the engineer estimate of $8,067,000. Wirth had a committee led by George Hartzog determine the validity of the bids in light of the government's conditions. Following a meeting with the bidders, the committee affirmed the bids' reasonableness, and Wirth awarded the lowest bidder, MacDonald Construction Co. of St. Louis, the contract for the construction of the arch and the visitor center. On March 14, 1962, he signed the contract and received from Tucker $2.5 million, the city's subsidy for the phase. MacDonald reduced its bid $500,000 to $11,442,418. The Pittsburgh-Des Moines Steel Company served as the subcontractor for the shell of the arch.

In 1959 and 1960, ground was broken, and in 1961, the foundation of the structure was laid. Construction of the arch itself began on February 12, 1963, as the first steel triangle on the south leg was eased into place. These steel triangles, which narrowed as they rose to the top, were raised into place by a group of cranes and derricks. The arch was assembled of 142 12-foot-long (3.7 m) prefabricated stainless steel sections. Once in place, each section had its double-walled skin filled with concrete, prestressed with 252 tension bars. In order to keep the partially completed legs steady, a scissors truss was placed between them at 530 feet (160 m), later removed as the derricks were taken down. The whole endeavor was expected to be completed by fall 1964, in observance of St. Louis's bicentennial. Insurance underwriters had estimated that thirteen construction workers may die on the project, and, fortunately, no one had died in the construction of the project.

Contractor MacDonald Construction Co. arranged a 30-foot (9 m) tower for spectators and provided recorded accounts of the undertaking. In 1963, a million people went to observe the progress, and by 1964, local radio stations began to broadcast when large slabs of steel were to be raised into place. St. Louis Post-Dispatch photographer Art Witman documented the construction for the newspaper's Sunday supplement Pictures, his longest and most noted assignment. He visited the construction site frequently from 1963 to 1967, recording every stage of progress. With assistant Renyold Ferguson, he crawled along the catwalks with the construction workers up to 620 ft (190 m) above the ground. He was the only news photographer on permanent assignment at the construction, with complete access. He primarily worked with slide film but also used the only Panox camera in St. Louis to create panoramic photographs covering 140 degrees. Witman's pictures of the construction are now housed in the State Historical Society of Missouri.

The project manager of MacDonald Construction Co., Stan Wolf, said that a 62-story building was easier to build than the arch: "In a building, everything is straight up, one thing on top of another. In this arch, everything is curved."

=== Delays and lawsuits ===
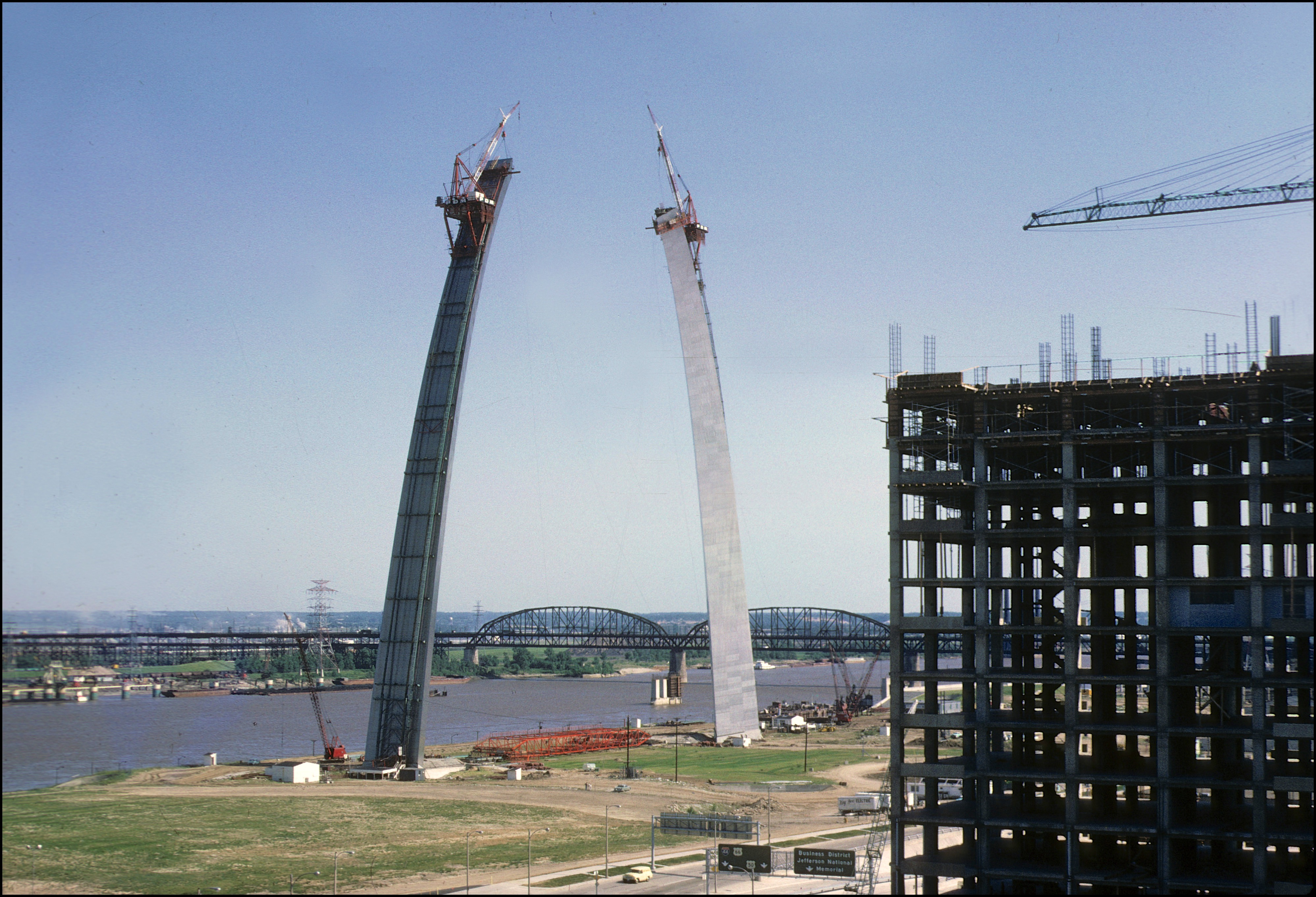
Arch construction in June 1965

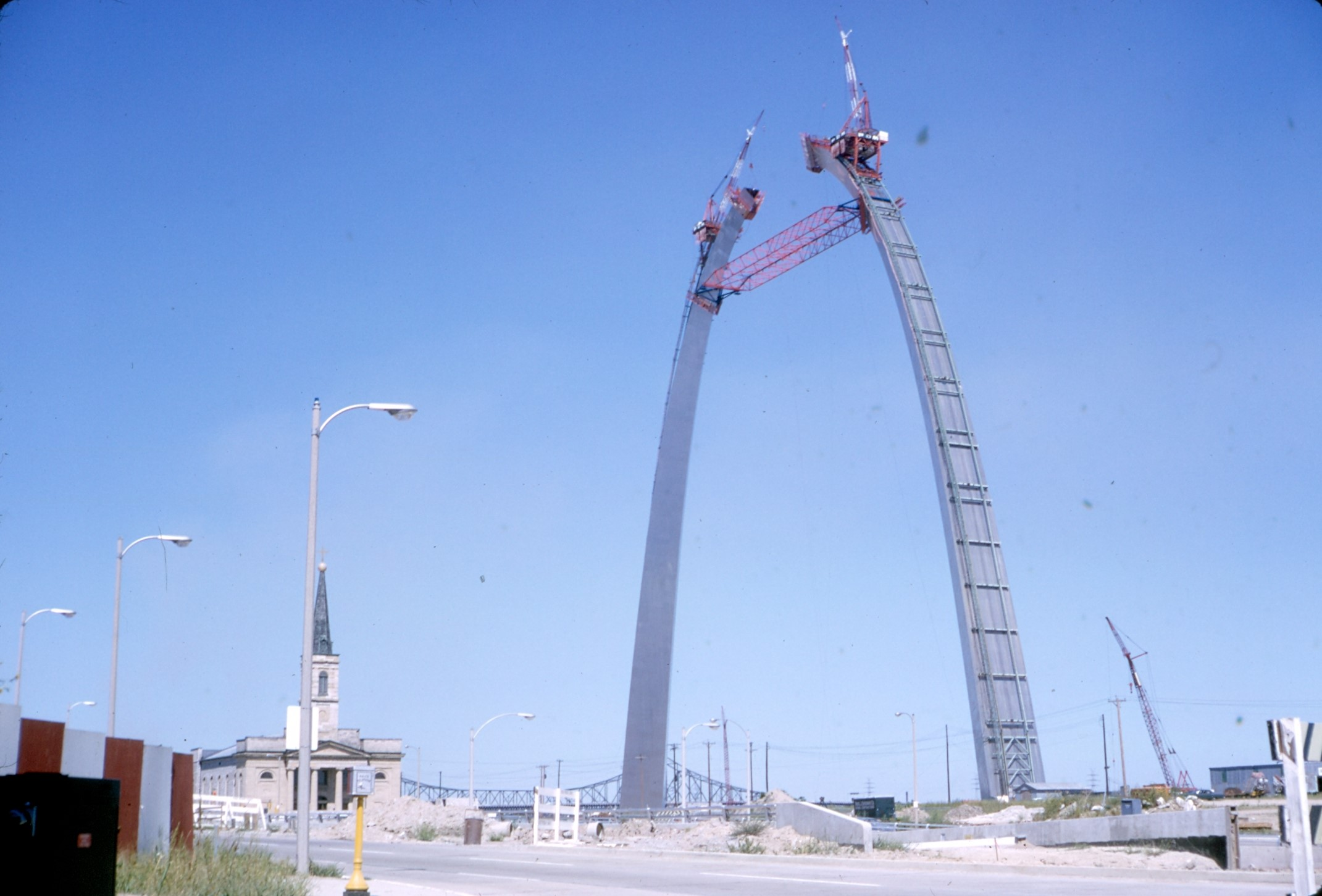
Arch Construction September 1965

Although an actuarial firm predicted thirteen workers would die while building the arch, no workers were killed during the monument's construction. However, construction of the arch was still often delayed by safety checks, funding uncertainties, and legal disputes.

Civil rights activists regarded the construction of the arch as a token of racial discrimination. On July 14, 1964, during the workers' lunchtime, civil rights protesters Percy Green and Richard Daly, both members of Congress of Racial Equality, climbed 125 feet (38 m) up the north leg of the arch to "expose the fact that federal funds were being used to build a national monument that was racially discriminating against black contractors and skilled black workers." As the pair disregarded demands to get off, protesters on the ground demanded that at least 10% of the skilled jobs belong to African Americans. Four hours later, Green and Daly dismounted from the arch to charges of "trespassing, peace disturbance, and resisting arrest." This incident inter alia spurred the United States Department of Justice to file the first pattern or practice case against AFL–CIO under Title VII of the Civil Rights Act of 1964, on February 4, 1966, but the department later called off the charges. The 1966 lawsuit was an attempt by the Office of Federal Contract Compliance (OFCC) to desegregate building-trade unions nationwide. Many technical building unions had little or no African-American representation into the mid-1960s. During Lyndon Johnson's presidency, the federal government recognized the need for more integration in all levels of society and started enforcing equal employment opportunity through federally funded job contracts.

In 1964, the Pittsburgh-Des Moines Steel Company of Warren, Pennsylvania, sued MacDonald for $665,317 for tax concerns. In 1965, NPS requested that Pittsburgh-Des Moines Steel remove the prominent letters "P-D-M" (its initials) from a creeper derrick used for construction, contending that it was promotional and violated federal law with regards to advertising on national monuments. Although Pittsburgh-Des Moines Steel initially refused to pursue what it considered a precarious venture, the company relented after discovering that leaving the initials would cost $225,000 and after that, $42,000 per month, and the NPS dropped its lawsuit.

On October 26, 1965, the International Association of Ironworkers delayed work to ascertain that the arch was safe. After NPS director Kenneth Chapman gave his word that conditions were "perfectly safe", construction resumed on October 27. After the discovery of 16 defects, the tram was also delayed from running. The Bi-State Development Agency assessed that it suffered losses of $2,000 for each day the trains were stagnant.

On January 7, 1966, members of AFL–CIO deserted their work on the visitor center, refusing to work with plumbers affiliated with Congress of Industrial Unions (CIU), which represented black plumbers. A representative of AFL–CIO said, "This policy has nothing to do with race. Our experience is that these CIU members have in the past worked for substandard wages." CIU applied to the National Labor Relations Board (NLRB) for an injunction that required the AFL–CIO laborers to return to work. On February 7, Judge John Keating Regan ruled that AFL–CIO workers had participated in a secondary boycott. By February 11, AFL–CIO resumed work on the arch, and an AFL–CIO contractor declared that ten African Americans were apprenticed for arch labor. The standstill in work lasted a month.

=== Topping out and dedication ===
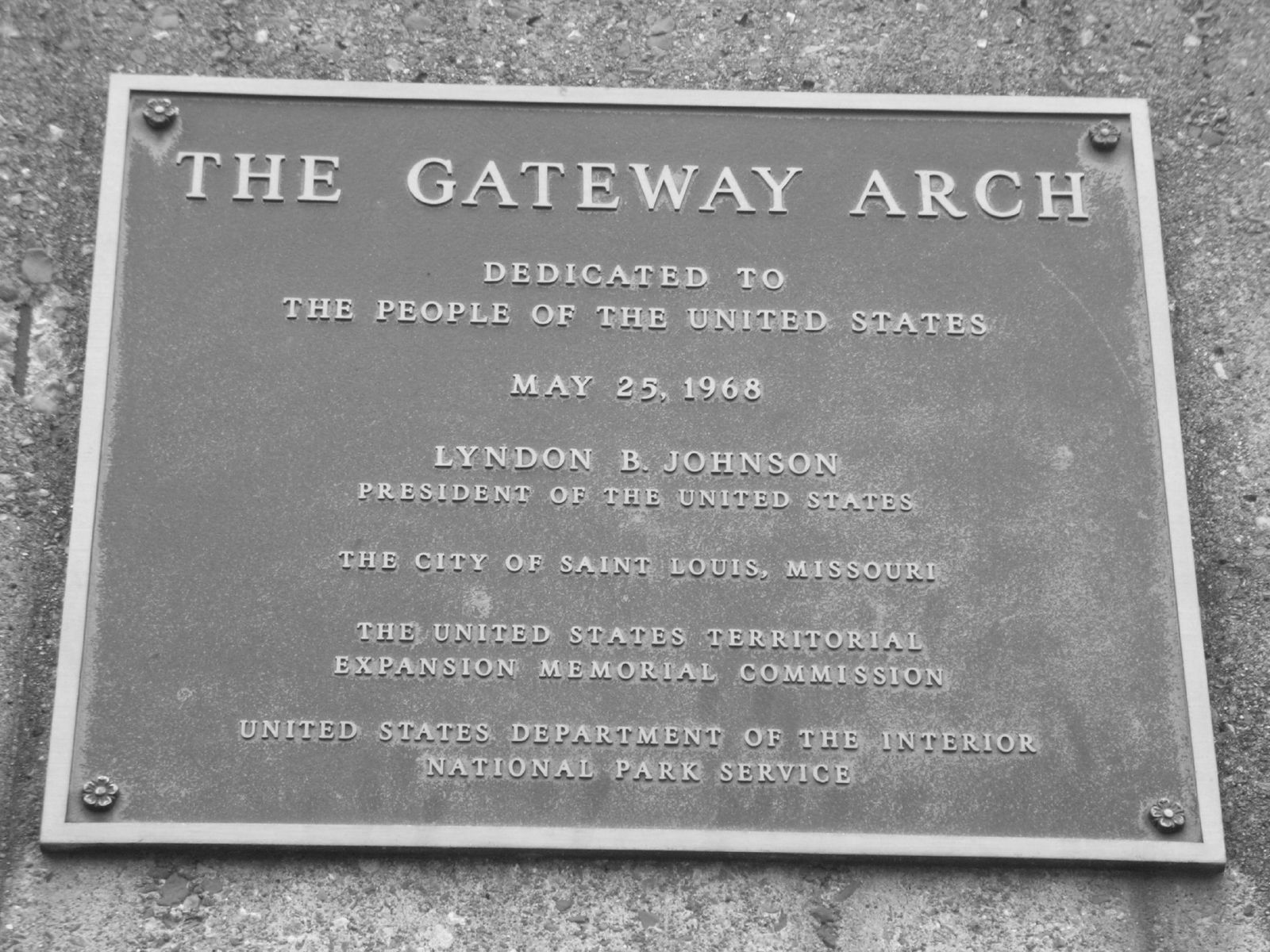
The dedication plaque

President Lyndon B. Johnson and Mayor Alfonso J. Cervantes decided on a date for the topping-out ceremony, but the arch had not been completed by then. The ceremony date was reset to October 17, 1965; workers strained to meet the deadline, taking double shifts, but by October 17, the arch was still not complete. The chairman of the ceremony anticipated the ceremony to be held on October 30, a Saturday, to allow 1,500 schoolchildren, whose signatures were to be placed in a time capsule, to attend. Ultimately, PDM set the ceremony date to October 28.

The time capsule, containing the signatures of 762,000 students and others, was welded into the keystone before the final piece was set in place. On October 28, the arch was topped out as then Vice President Hubert Humphrey observed from a helicopter. A Catholic priest and a rabbi prayed over the keystone, a 10-short-ton (9.1 t), eight-foot-long (2.4 m) triangular section. It was slated to be inserted at 10:00 a.m. local time but was done 30 minutes early because thermal expansion had constricted the 8.5-foot (2.6 m) gap at the top by 5 inches (13 cm). To mitigate this, workers used fire hoses to spray water on the surface of the south leg to cool it down and make it contract. The keystone was inserted in 13 minutes with only 6 inches (15 cm) remaining. For the next section, a hydraulic jack had to pry apart the legs six feet (1.8 m). The last section was left only 2.5 feet (0.76 m). By noon, the keystone was secured. Some filmmakers, in hope that the two legs would not meet, had chronicled every phase of construction.

The Gateway Arch was expected to open to the public by 1964, but in 1967 the public relations agency stopped forecasting the opening date. The arch's visitor center opened on June 10, 1967, and the tram began operating on July 24.

The arch was dedicated by Humphrey on May 25, 1968. He declared that the arch was "a soaring curve in the sky that links the rich heritage of yesterday with the richer future of tomorrow" and brings a "new purpose" and a "new sense of urgency to wipe out every slum." "Whatever is shoddy, whatever is ugly, whatever is waste, whatever is false, will be measured and condemned" in comparison to the Gateway Arch. About 250,000 people were expected to attend, but rain canceled the outdoor activities. The ceremony had to be transferred into the visitor center. (Note: When Stuart Udall, then Secretary of the Interior, discussed the story of the arch, an African American person rose and hollered, "[Y]ou're all racists ... we want jobs, not arches." Behind him, a man wearing a veteran's hat jostled him, and Secret Service personnel removed him from the room. Udall resumed his speech, unperturbed.) After the dedication, Humphrey crouched beneath an exit as he waited for the rain to subside so he could walk to his vehicle.

=== After completion ===
The project did not provide 5,000 jobs as expected—as of June 1964, workers numbered fewer than 100. The project did, however, incentivize other riverfront restoration efforts, totaling $150 million. Building projects included a 50,000-seat sports stadium, a 30-story hotel, several office towers, four parking garages, and an apartment complex. The idea of a Disneyland amusement park that included "synthetic riverboat attractions" was considered but later abandoned. The developers hoped to use the arch as a commercial catalyst, attracting visitors who would use their services. One estimate found that since the 1960s, the arch has incited almost $503 million worth of construction.

In June 1976, the memorial was finalized by federal allocations—"the statue of Thomas Jefferson was unveiled, the Museum of Westward Expansion was previewed, a theater under the Arch was dedicated in honor of Mayor Raymond Tucker and the catenary-like curving staircases from the Arch down to the levee were built."

== Characteristics ==
=== Physical characteristics ===
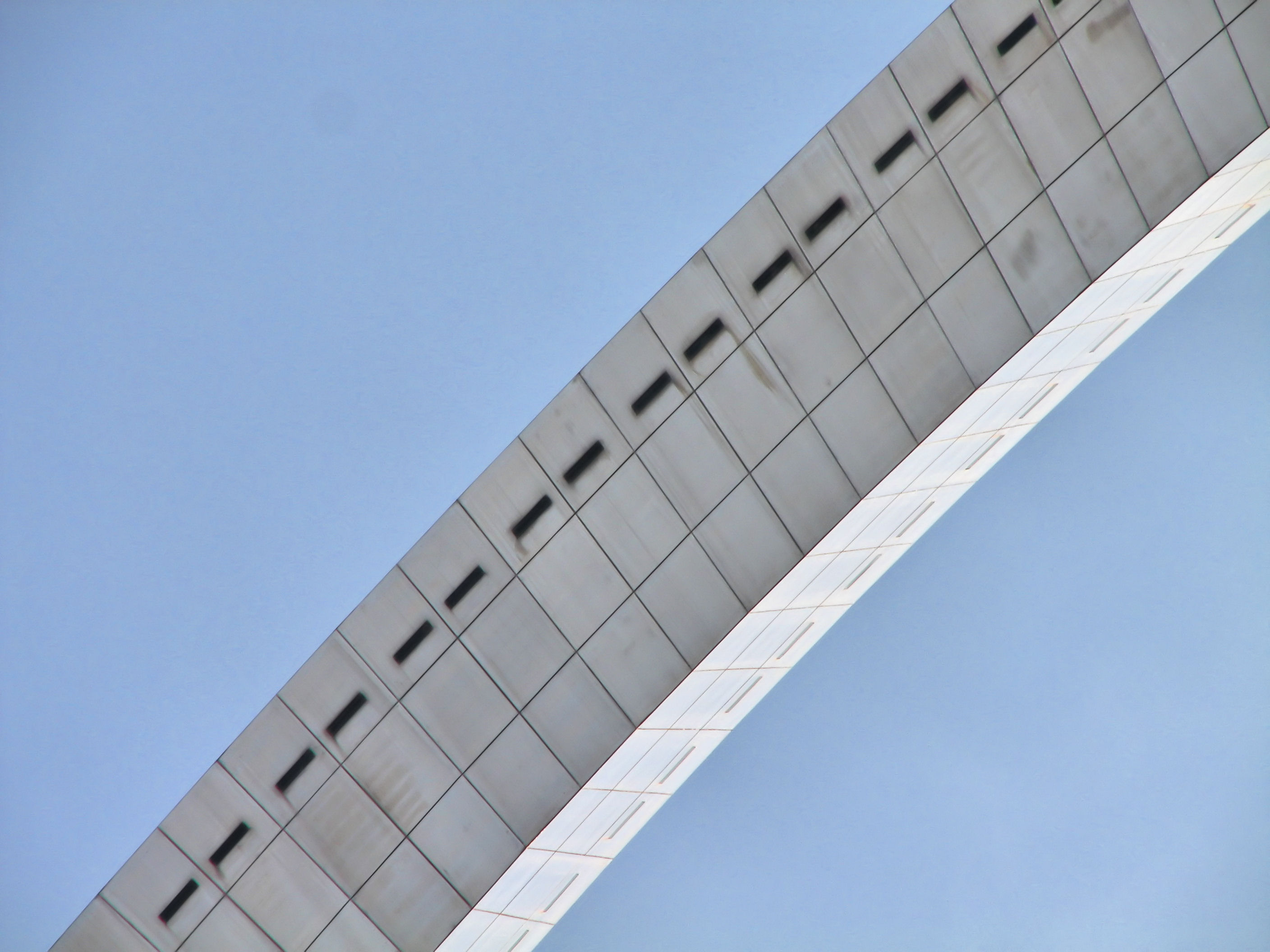
The windows of the observation deck are located around the apex of the arch.

Both the width and height of the arch are 630 feet (192 m). The arch is the tallest memorial in the United States and the tallest stainless steel monument in the world.

The cross-sections of the arch's legs are equilateral triangles, narrowing from 54 feet (16 m) per side at the bases to 17 feet (5.2 m) per side at the top. Each wall consists of a stainless steel skin covering a sandwich of two carbon-steel walls with reinforced concrete in the middle from ground level to 300 feet (91 m), with carbon steel to the peak. The arch is hollow to accommodate a unique tram system that takes visitors to an observation deck at the top.

The structural load is supported by a stressed-skin design. Each leg is embedded in 25,980 short tons (23,570 t) of concrete 44 feet (13 m) thick and 60 feet (18 m) deep. Twenty feet (6.1 m) of the foundation is in bedrock. The arch is resistant to earthquakes and is designed to sway up to 18 inches (46 cm) in either direction, while withstanding winds up to 150 miles per hour (240 km/h). The structure weighs 42,878 short tons (38,898 t), of which concrete composes 25,980 short tons (23,570 t); structural steel interior, 2,157 short tons (1,957 t); and the 0.25-inch (6.3 mm) thick grade 304 stainless steel panels that cover the exterior of the arch, 886 short tons (804 t). This amount of stainless steel is the most used in any one project in history.

=== Mathematical elements ===
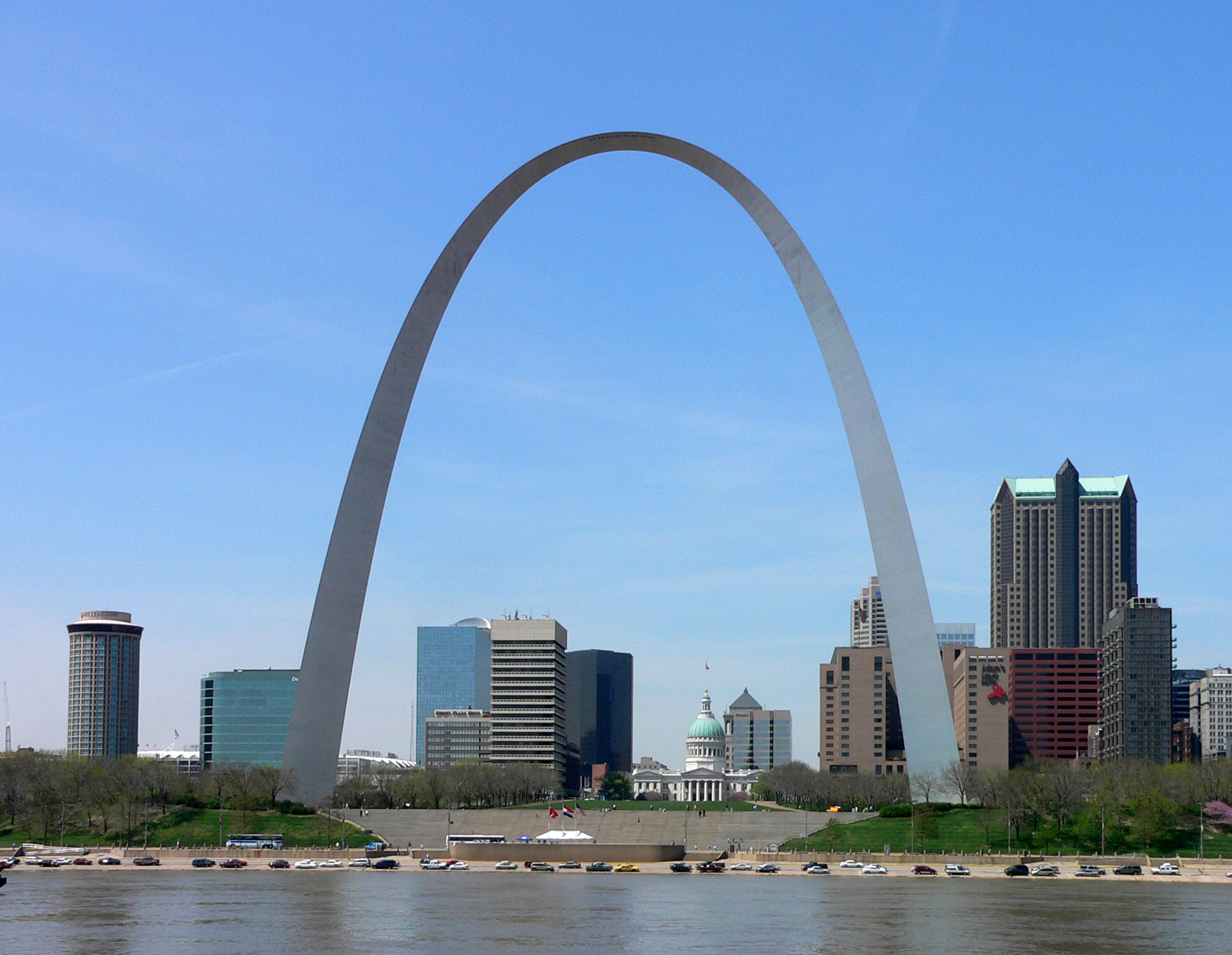
The arch is a weighted catenary—its legs are wider than its upper section.

The geometric form of the structure was set by mathematical equations provided to Saarinen by the German-American engineer Hannskarl Bandel. Bruce Detmers and other architects expressed the centroidal curve of the arch, along which the centroids of the triangular cross sections lie, with this equation:

$y = A \left( \cosh \frac {Cx}{L}-1 \right) \quad\Leftrightarrow\quad x = \frac {L}{C} \operatorname{arcosh} \left( 1 + \frac {y}{A} \right)$,

with the constants

$A = \frac {f_c} {Q_b/Q_t - 1} = 68.7672$

$C = \operatorname{arcosh} \frac {Q_b}{Q_t} = 3.0022$

Rewriting the equation with ground level as y = 0 gives the centroid curve as

$h(x)=f_c-A(\cosh(Cx/L)-1)$

where f_{c} = 625.0925 ft (190.5282 m) is the maximum height of centroid, Q_{b} = 1,262.6651 sq ft (117.30543 m^{2}) is the maximum cross sectional area of arch at base, Q_{t} = 125.1406 sq ft (11.62594 m^{2}) is the minimum cross sectional area of arch at top, and L = 299.2239 ft (91.20344 m) is the half width of centroid at the base. From the base to the crown, the area of each triangular cross section decreases linearly with the vertical height of its centroid. The triangular cross section remains normal to the centroidal curve, reaching a vertical orientation at the crown.

This hyperbolic cosine function describes the shape of a catenary. A chain that supports only its own weight forms a catenary; the chain is purely in tension. Likewise, an inverted catenary arch that supports only its own weight is purely in compression, with no shear. The catenary arch is the stablest of all arches since the thrust passes through the legs and is absorbed in the foundations, instead of forcing the legs apart. The Gateway Arch itself is not a common catenary, but a more general curve of the form y=Acosh (Bx). This makes it an inverted weighted catenary. Saarinen chose a weighted catenary over a normal catenary curve because it looked less pointed and less steep. In 1959, he caused some confusion about the actual shape of the arch when he wrote, "This arch is not a true parabola, as is often stated. Instead it is a catenary curve—the curve of a hanging chain—a curve in which the forces of thrust are continuously kept within the center of the legs of the arch." William V. Thayer, a professor of mathematics at St. Louis Community College, later wrote to the St. Louis Post-Dispatch calling attention to the fact that the structure was a weighted catenary.

=== Lighting ===
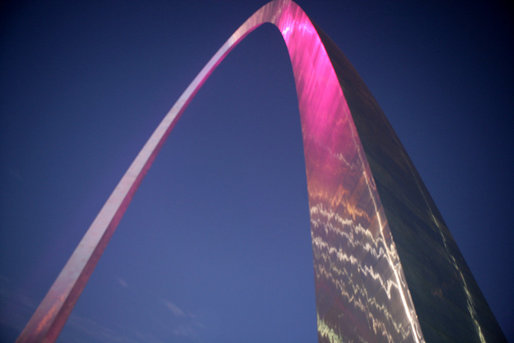
The arch illuminated in pink in honor of Breast Cancer Awareness Month

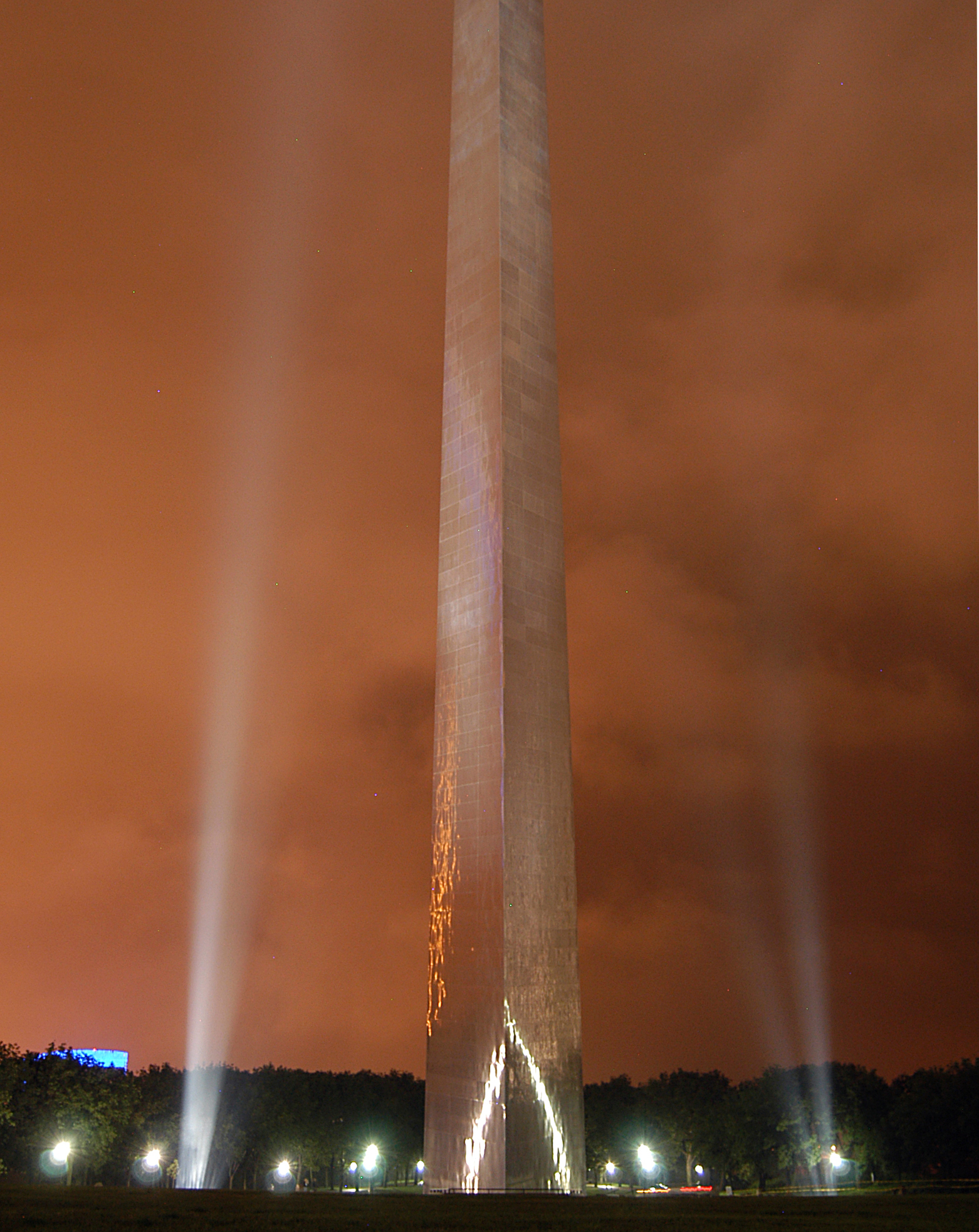
The arch's lighting system

The first proposal to illuminate the arch at night was announced on May 18, 1966, but the plan never came to fruition. In July 1998, funding for an arch lighting system was approved by St. Louis's Gateway Foundation, which agreed to take responsibility for the cost of the equipment, its installation, and its upkeep. In January 1999, MSNBC arranged a temporary lighting system for the arch so the monument could be used as the background for a visit by Pope John Paul II. Since November 2001, the arch has been bathed in white light between 10 p.m. and 1 a.m. via a system of floodlights. Designed by Randy Burkett, it comprises 44 lighting fixtures situated in four pits just below ground level.

On October 5, 2004, the US Senate—at the request of both of Missouri's US Senators, Jim Talent and Kit Bond—approved a bill permitting the illumination in pink of the arch in honor of breast cancer awareness month. Both Estee Lauder and May Department Store Co. had championed the cause. One employee said that the arch would be a "beacon ... for the importance of prevention and finding a cure." While the National Park Service took issue with the plan due to the precedent it would set for prospective uses of the arch, it yielded due to a realization that it and Congress were "on the same team" and because the illumination was legally obligatory; on October 25, the plan was carried out. The previous time the arch was illuminated for promotional purposes was on September 12, 1995, under the management of local companies Fleishman-Hillard and Technical Productions when a rainbow spectrum was shone on the arch to publicize the debut of Ringling Bros. and Barnum & Bailey Circus's Wizard of Oz on Ice at the Kiel Center.

== Public access ==
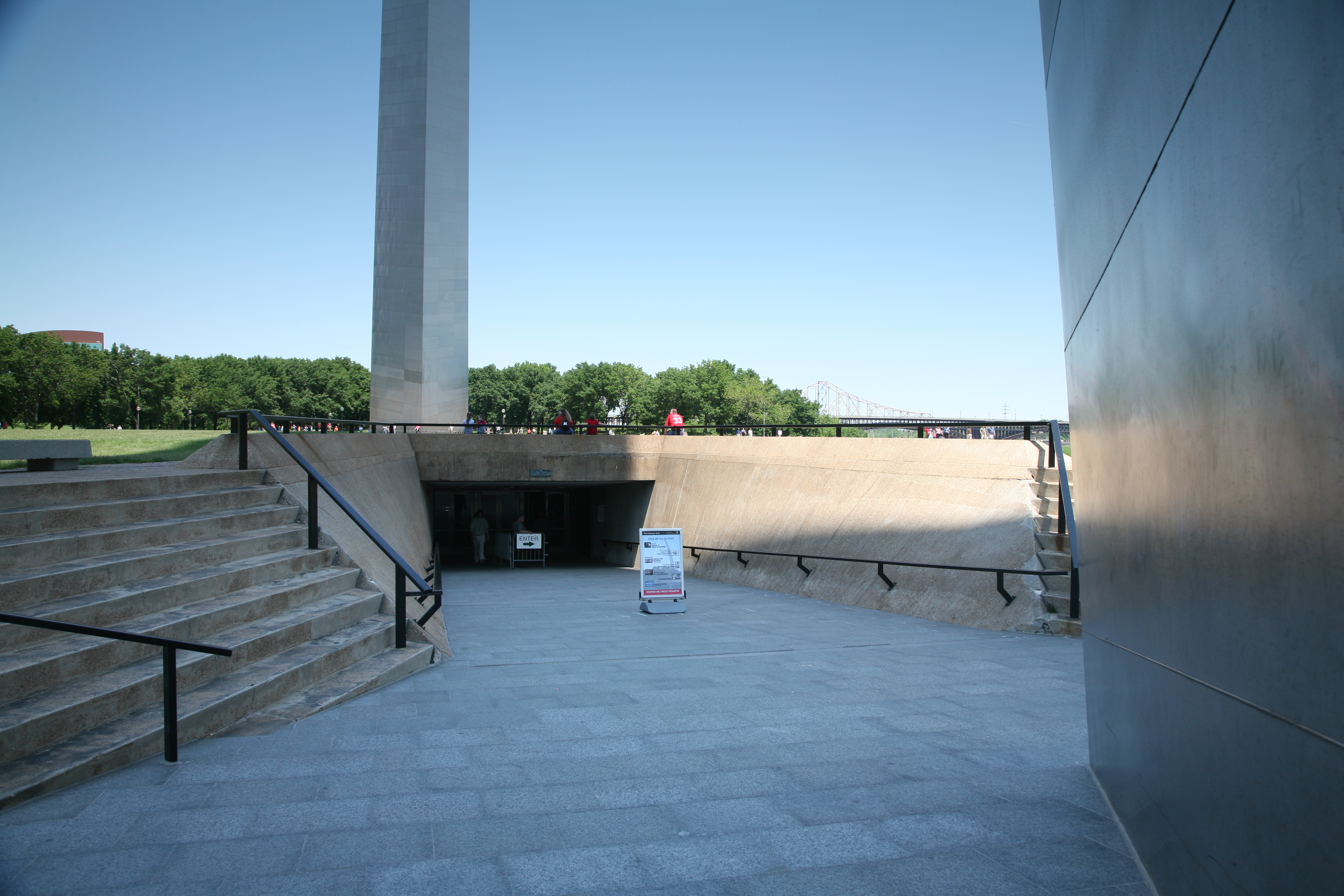
Southern entrance to the subterranean visitor center

In April 1965, three million tourists were expected to visit the arch annually after completion; 619,763 tourists visited the top of the arch in its first year open. On January 15, 1969, a visitor from Nashville, Tennessee, became the one-millionth person to reach the observation area; the ten-millionth person ascended to the top on August 24, 1979. In 1974, the arch was ranked fourth on a list of "most-visited man-made attraction[s]". In 2010, the Gateway Arch had over four million visitors, of which around one million traveled to the top. In 2022, an estimated 1.62 million people visited the Arch.

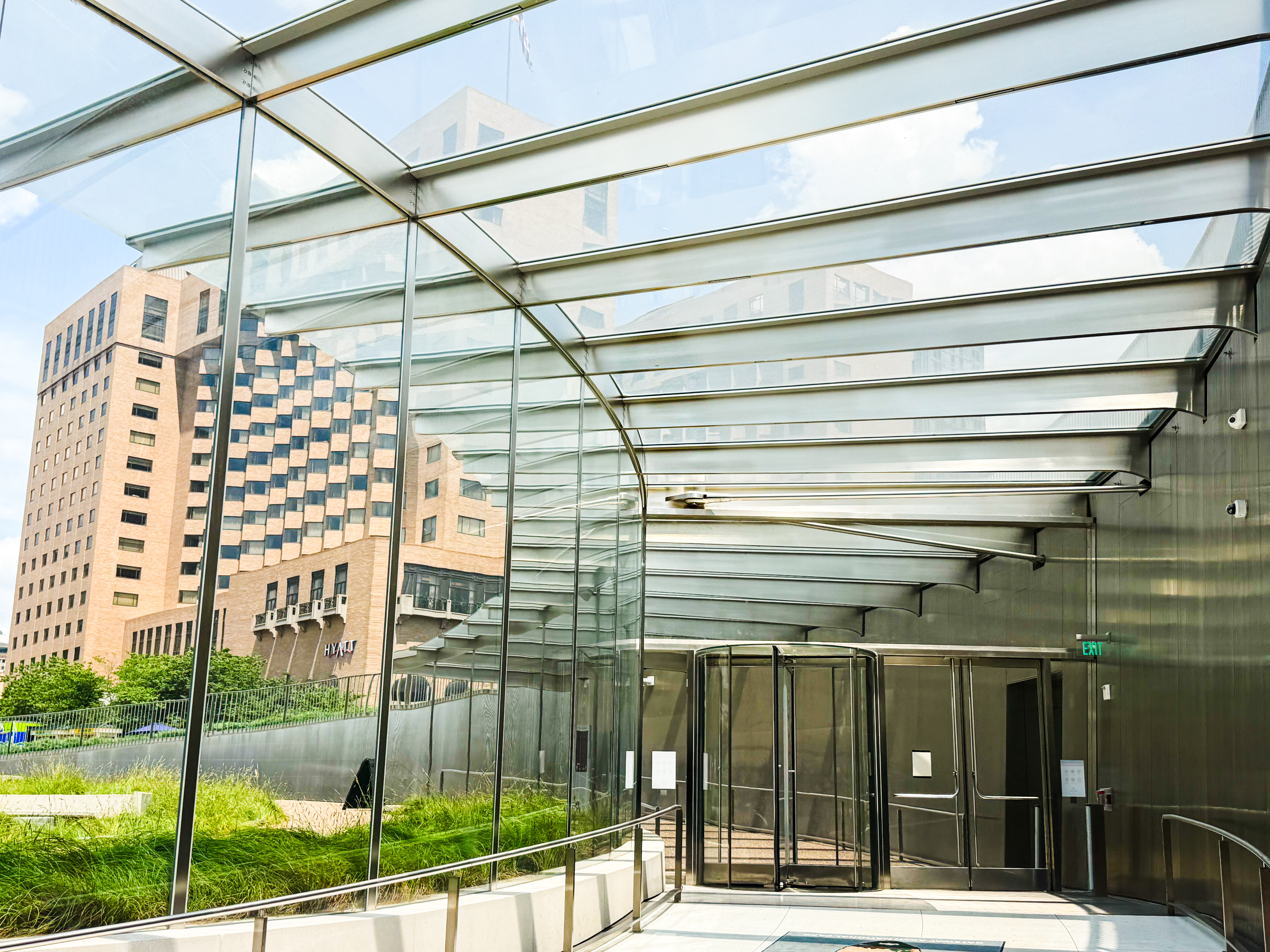
Entrance to the visitor center and museum

As the Arch is run by the National Park Service, it is subject to closure when the US federal government shuts down due to lapses in appropriations.

=== Visitor center ===
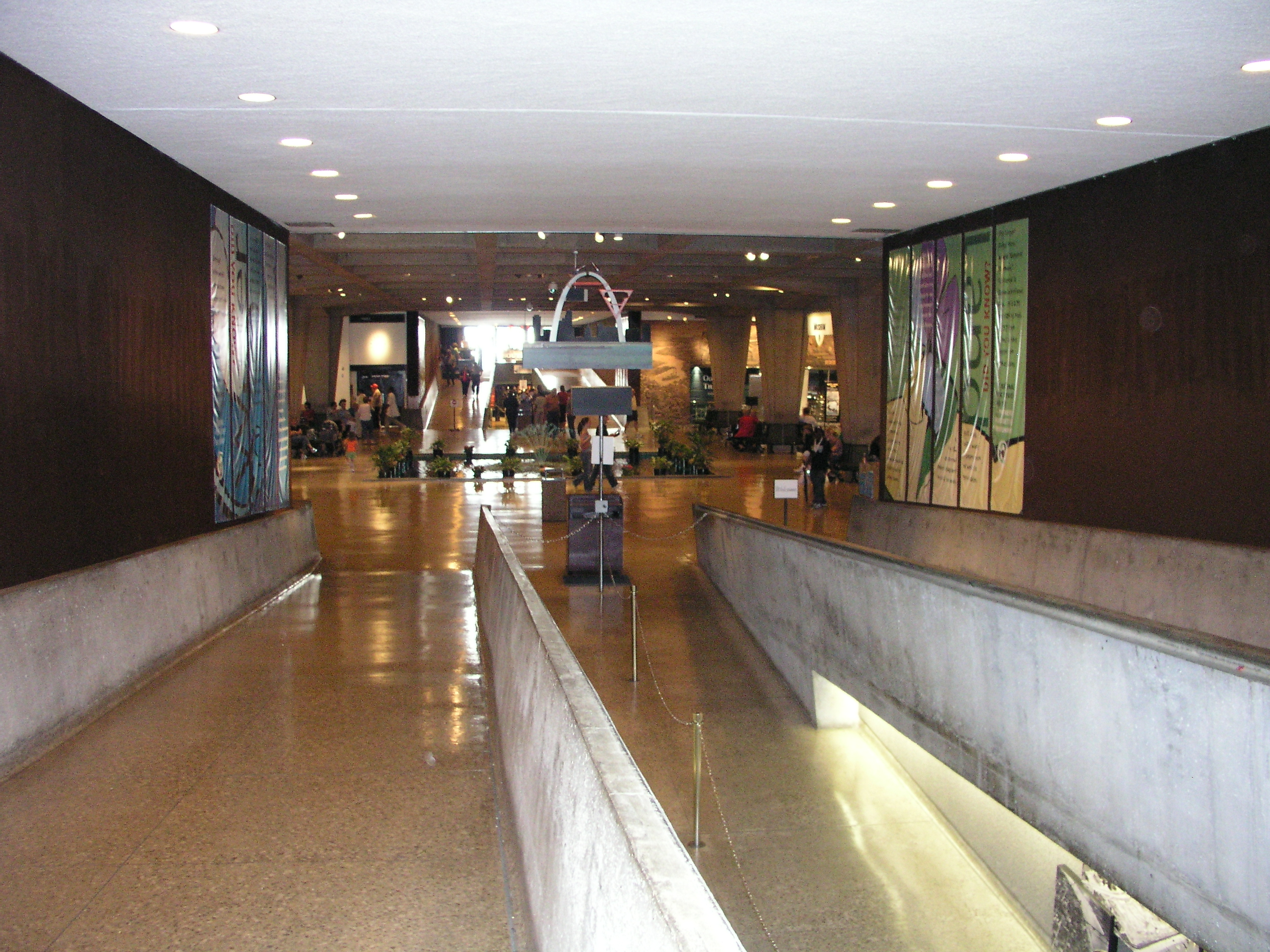
Inside the visitor center prior to its 2018 renovation

The underground visitor center for the arch was designed as part of the National Park Service's Mission 66 program. The 70,000-square-foot (6,500 m^{2}) center is located directly below the arch, between its legs. Although construction on the visitor center began at the same time as construction for the arch itself, it did not conclude until 1976 because of insufficient funding; however, the center opened with several exhibits on June 10, 1967. Access to the visitor center is provided through ramps adjacent to each leg of the arch.

The center houses offices, mechanical rooms, and waiting areas for the arch trams, as well as its main attractions: the Museum of Westward Expansion and two theaters displaying films about the arch. The older theater opened in May 1972; the newer theater, called the Odyssey Theatre, was constructed in the 1990s and features a four-story-tall screen. Its construction required the expansion of the underground complex, and workers had to excavate solid rock while keeping the disruption to a minimum so the museum could remain open. The museum houses several hundred exhibits about the United States' westward expansion in the 19th century and opened on August 10, 1977.

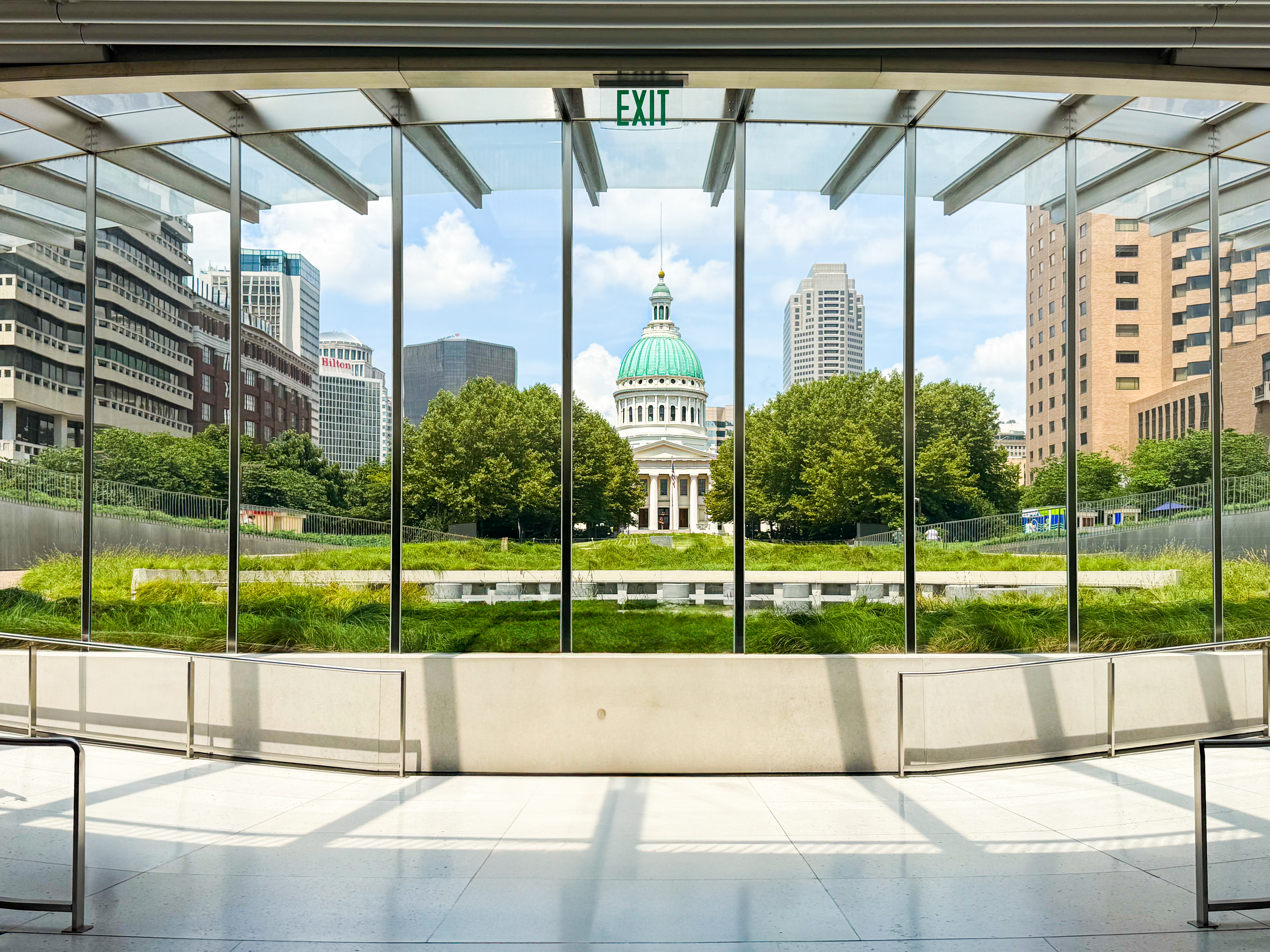
The front of the visitor center as viewed from inside (after 2018 renovation)

As part of the CityArchRiver project, the visitor center and museum underwent a $176 million expansion and renovation that was completed in July 2018. The renovation includes a 46,000-square-foot underground addition featuring interactive story galleries, video walls, a fountain and a cafe.

=== Observation area ===
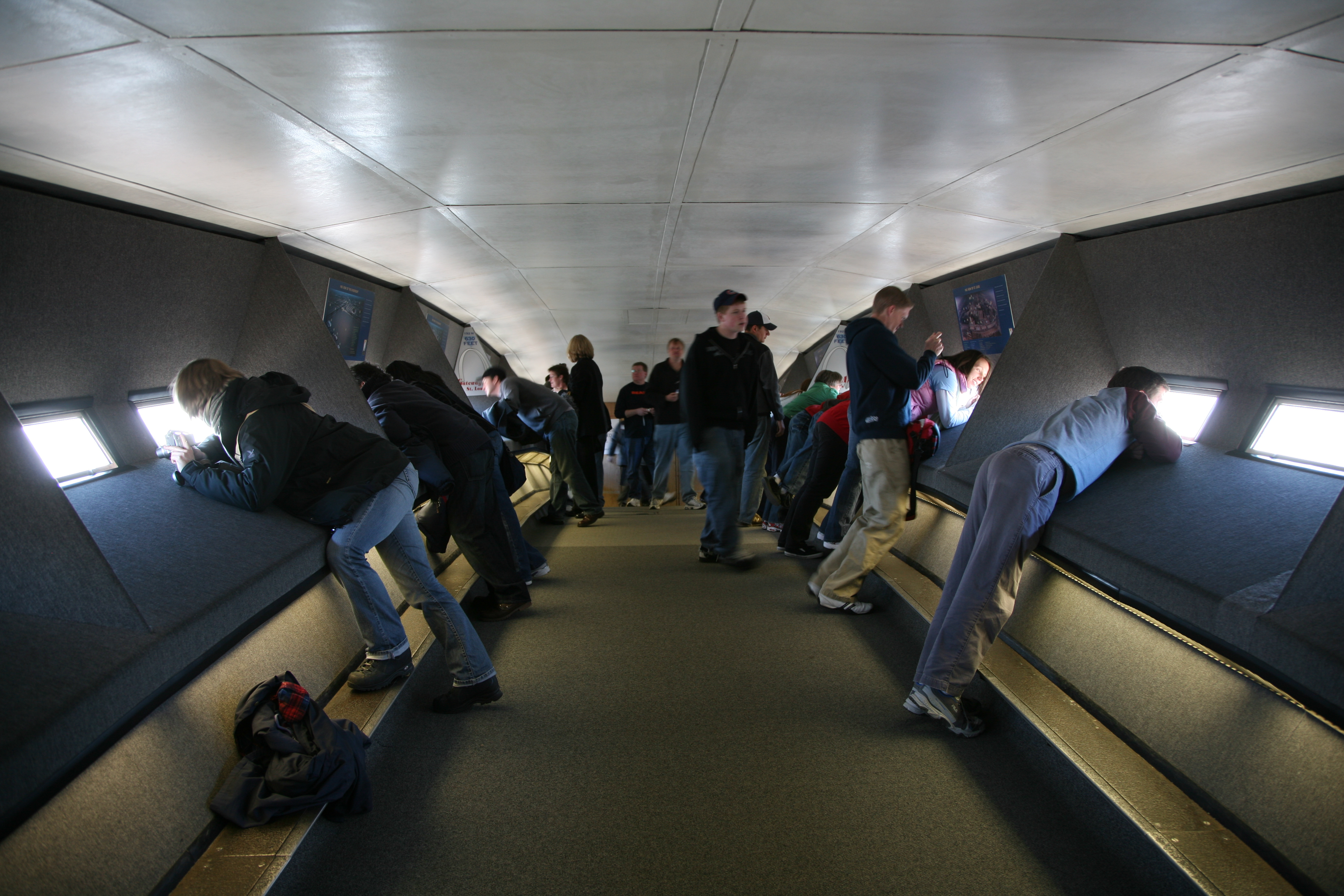
Observation area on top of the Gateway Arch

Near the top of the Arch, passengers exit the tram compartment and climb a slight grade to enter the observation area. This arched deck, which is over 65 feet (20 m) long and 7 feet (2.1 m) wide, can hold up to about 160 people, equivalent to the number of people from four trams. Sixteen windows per side, each measuring 7 by 27 inches (180 mm × 690 mm), offer views up to 30 miles (48 km) away.

==== Modes of ascent ====
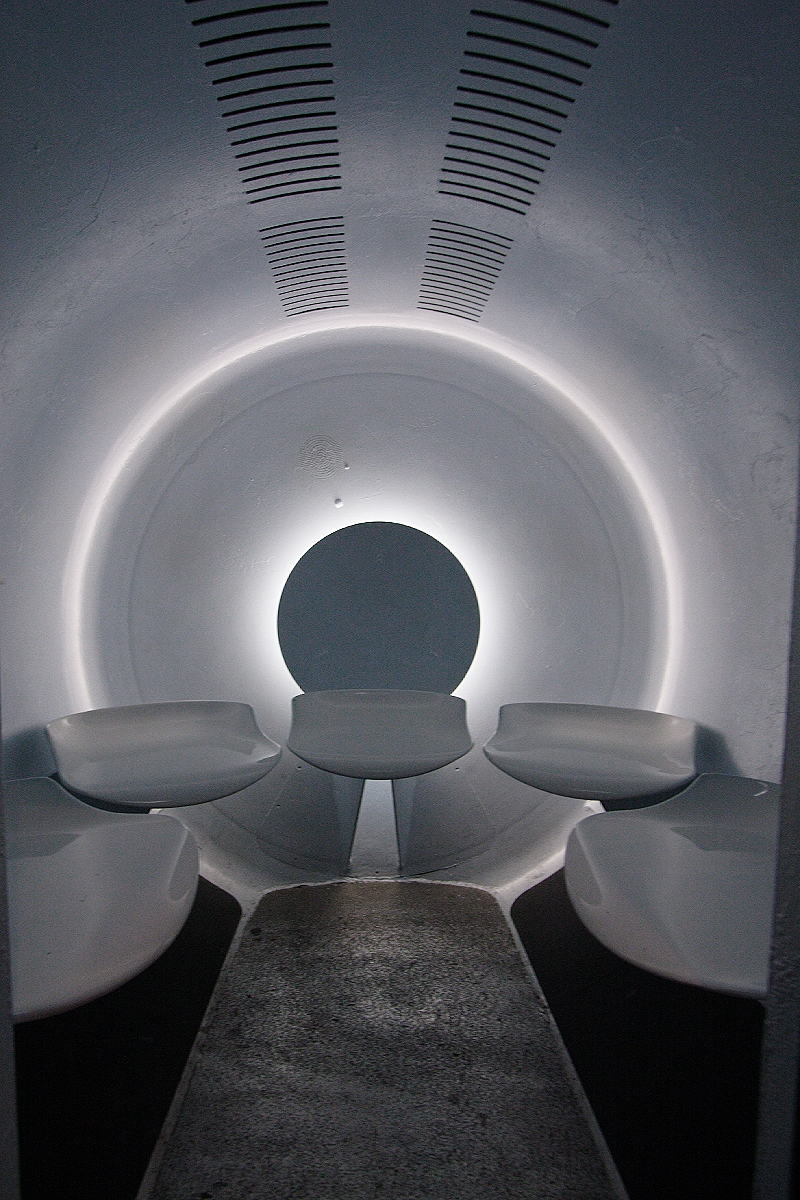
Interior of the tram capsule in the Gateway Arch

There are three modes of transportation up the arch: two sets of 1,076-step emergency stairs (one per leg), a 12-passenger elevator to the 372-foot (113 m) height, and a tram in each leg.

Each tram is a chain of eight cylindrical, five-seat compartments with glass doors. As each tram has a capacity of 40 passengers and there are two trams, 80 passengers can be transported at one time, with trams departing from the ground every 10 minutes. The compartments (capsules) rotate like Ferris-wheel cars as they ascend and descend the arch on rails. This fashion of movement gave rise to the idea of the tram as "half-Ferris wheel and half-elevator." The trip to the top takes four minutes, and the trip down takes three minutes.

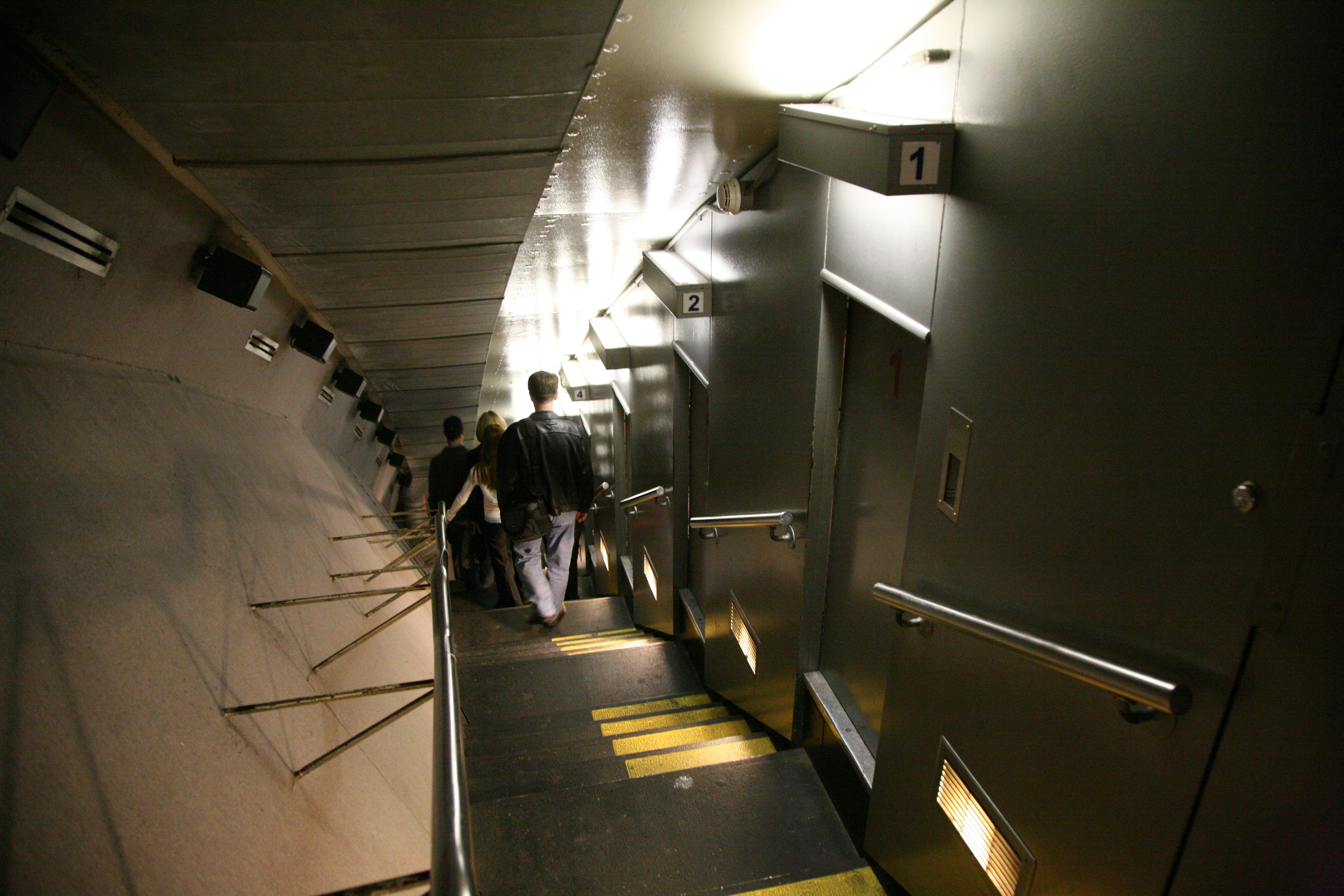
North stairs and tram descending from observation platform

Because of a lack of funds in March 1962, the NPS did not accept bids for the arch's internal train system and considered discarding the idea. In May 1962, the Bi-State Development Agency proposed that it issue revenue bonds to obtain the required funds. The Department of the Interior and Bi-State entered into an agreement where Bi-State would construct and operate the tram. Bi-State would have to raise $1,977,750 for the construction of the tram system. It retired the bonds by setting a $1 riding fee to the top. (Note: Some locals wrote letters to the St. Louis Post-Dispatch accusing Bi-State of "gouging".)

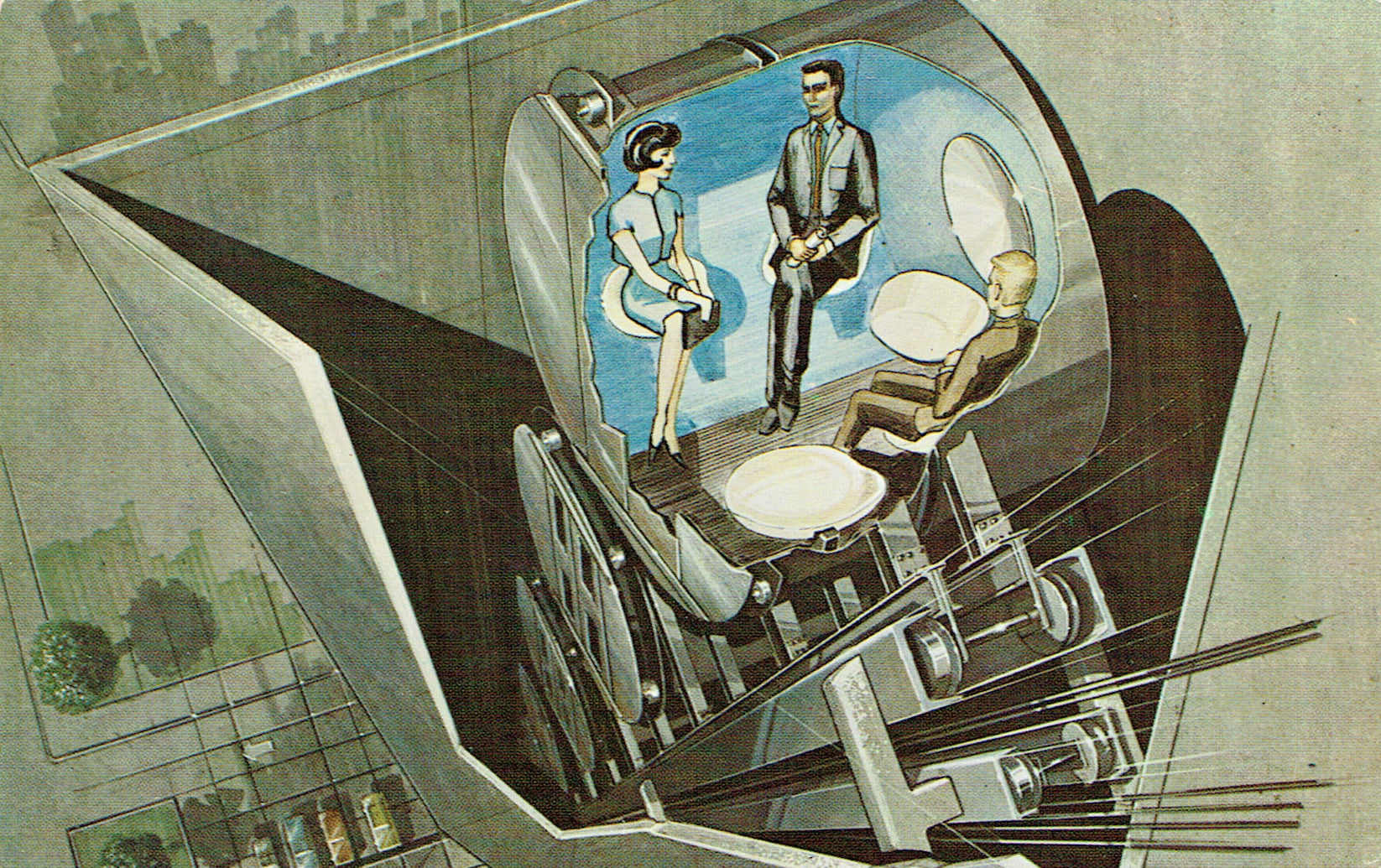
Artist drawing of the tram system in the Arch (1966 Postcard)

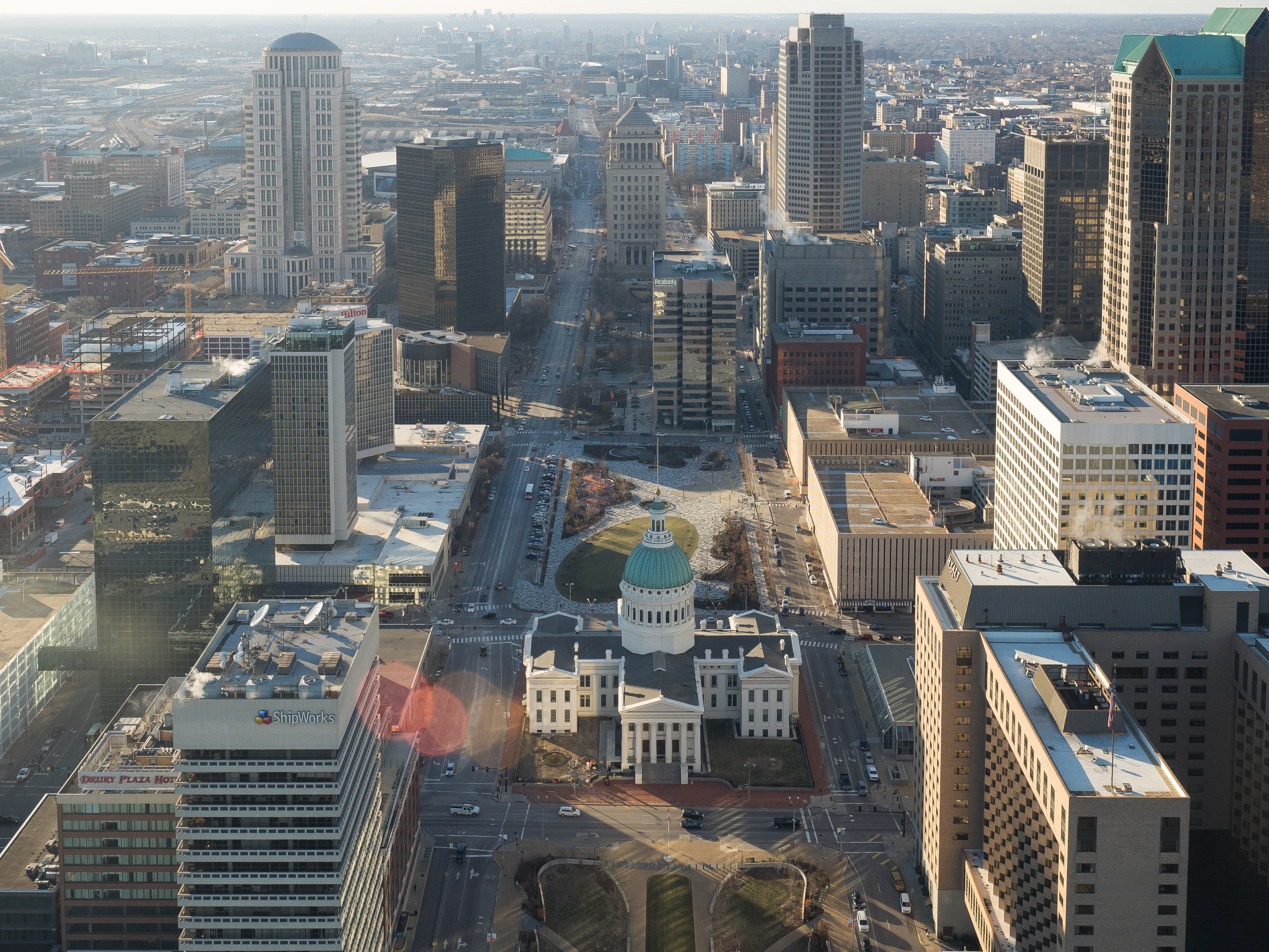
A view of the city of St. Louis from the observation room of the St. Louis Arch

Bi-State put in $3.3 million revenue bonds and has operated the tram system since. The tram in the north leg entered operation in June 1967, but visitors were forced to endure three-hour-long waits until April 21, 1976, when a reservation system was put in place. The south tram was completed by March 1968. Commemorative pins were awarded to the first 100,000 passengers. As of 2007, the trams have traveled 250,000 miles (400,000 km), conveying more than 25 million passengers.

==== Incidents ====
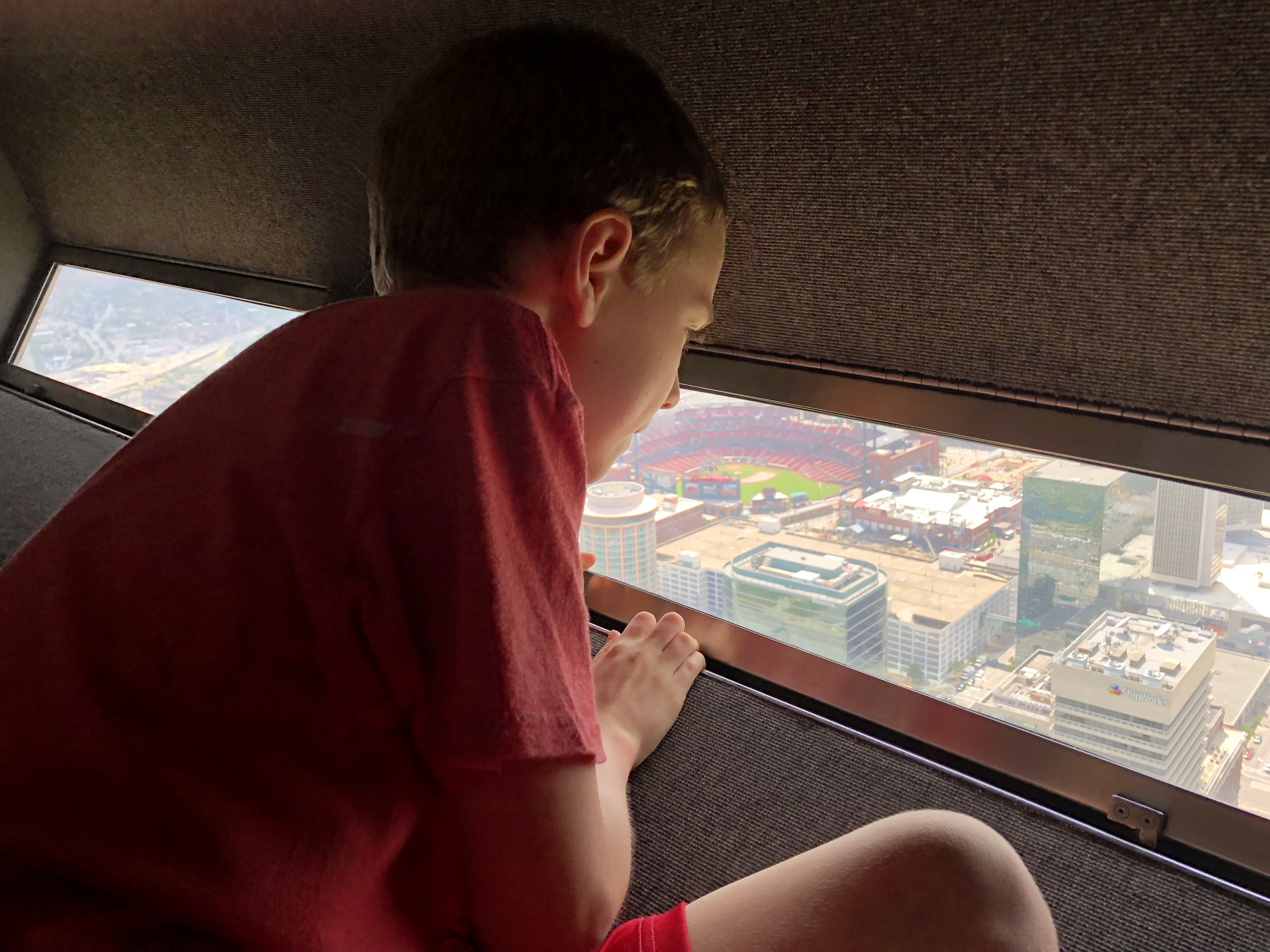
A boy is looking out one of the observation windows at the city of St. Louis. Busch Stadium can be seen through the window.

On July 8, 1970, a six-year-old boy, his mother, and two of her friends were trapped in a tram in the arch's south leg after the monument closed. According to the boy's mother, the group went up the arch around 9:30 p.m. CDT, but when the tram reached the de-boarding area, its doors did not open. The tram then reportedly traveled up to a storage area 50 feet (15 m) above the ground, and the power was switched off. One person was able to pry open the tram door and the four managed to reach a security guard for help after being trapped for about 45 minutes.

On July 21, 2007, a broken cable forced the south tram to be shut down, leaving only the north tram in service until repairs were completed in March 2008. Around 200 tourists were stuck inside the arch for about three hours. The incident occurred while visitors in the arch were watching a fireworks display, and no one was seriously injured in the event, though two people received medical treatment. Almost immediately after the tram returned to service in 2008, however, it was closed again for new repairs after an electrical switch broke. The incident, which occurred on March 14, was billed as a "bad coincidence."

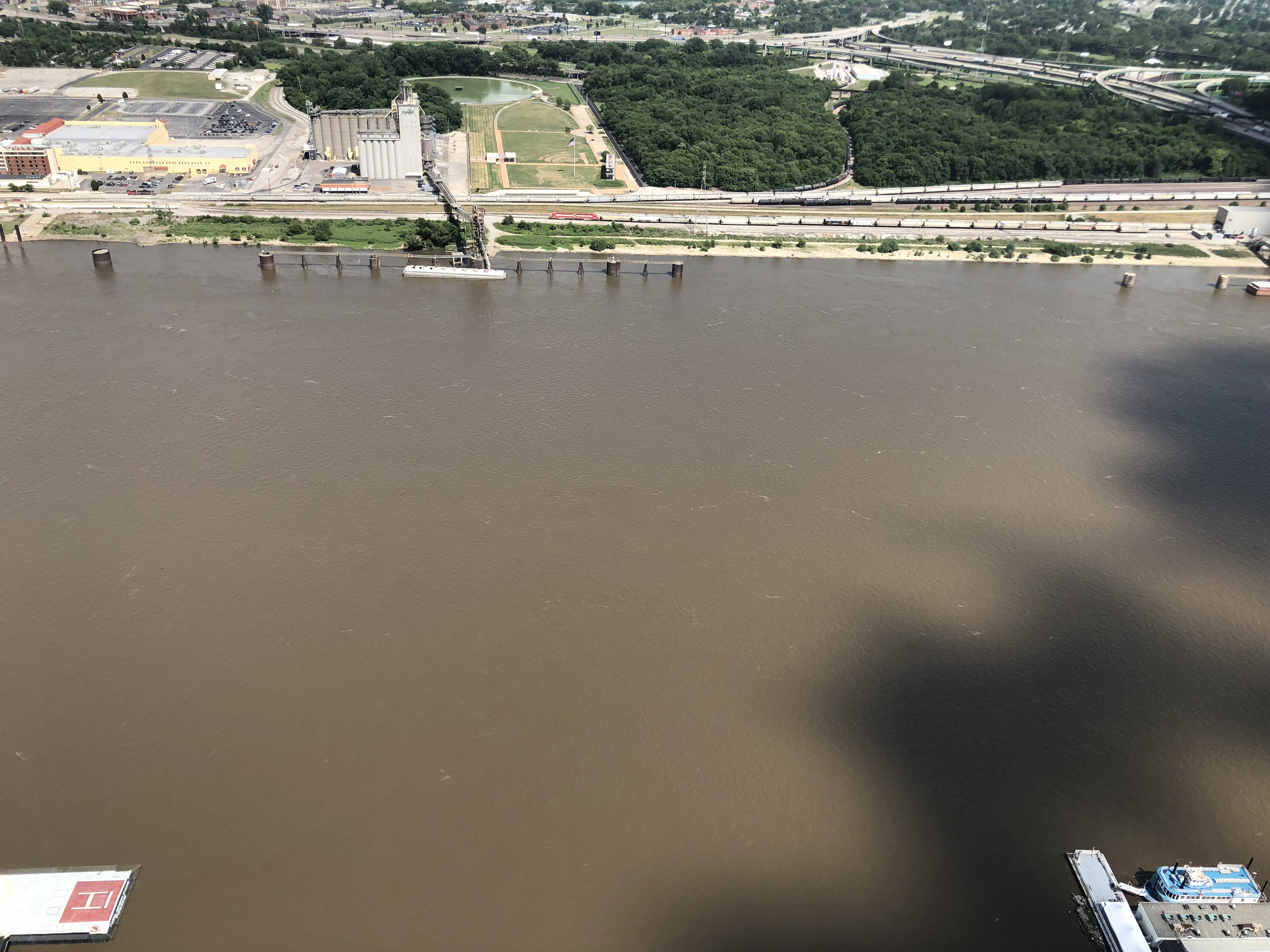
A view of the Mississippi River from the observation room of the St. Louis Arch.

On the morning of February 9, 2011, a National Park Service worker was injured while performing repairs on the south tram. The 55-year-old was working on the tram's electrical system when he was trapped between it and the arch wall for around 30 seconds, until being saved by other workers. Emergency officials treated the injured NPS employee at the arch's top before taking him to Saint Louis University Hospital in a serious condition.

On March 24, 2011, around one hundred visitors were stranded in the observation area for 45 minutes after the doors of the south tram refused to close; no one was hurt. The tourists were safely brought down the arch in the north tram, which had been closed that week so officials could upgrade it with a new computer system. The National Park Service later attributed the malfunction to a computer glitch associated with the new system, which had already been implemented with the south tram.

Around 2:15 p.m. local time on June 16, 2011, the arch's north tram stalled due to a power outage. No one was seriously injured in the incident, but one visitor lost consciousness after suffering a panic attack, and a park ranger was taken away with minor injuries.

=== Stunts and accidents ===
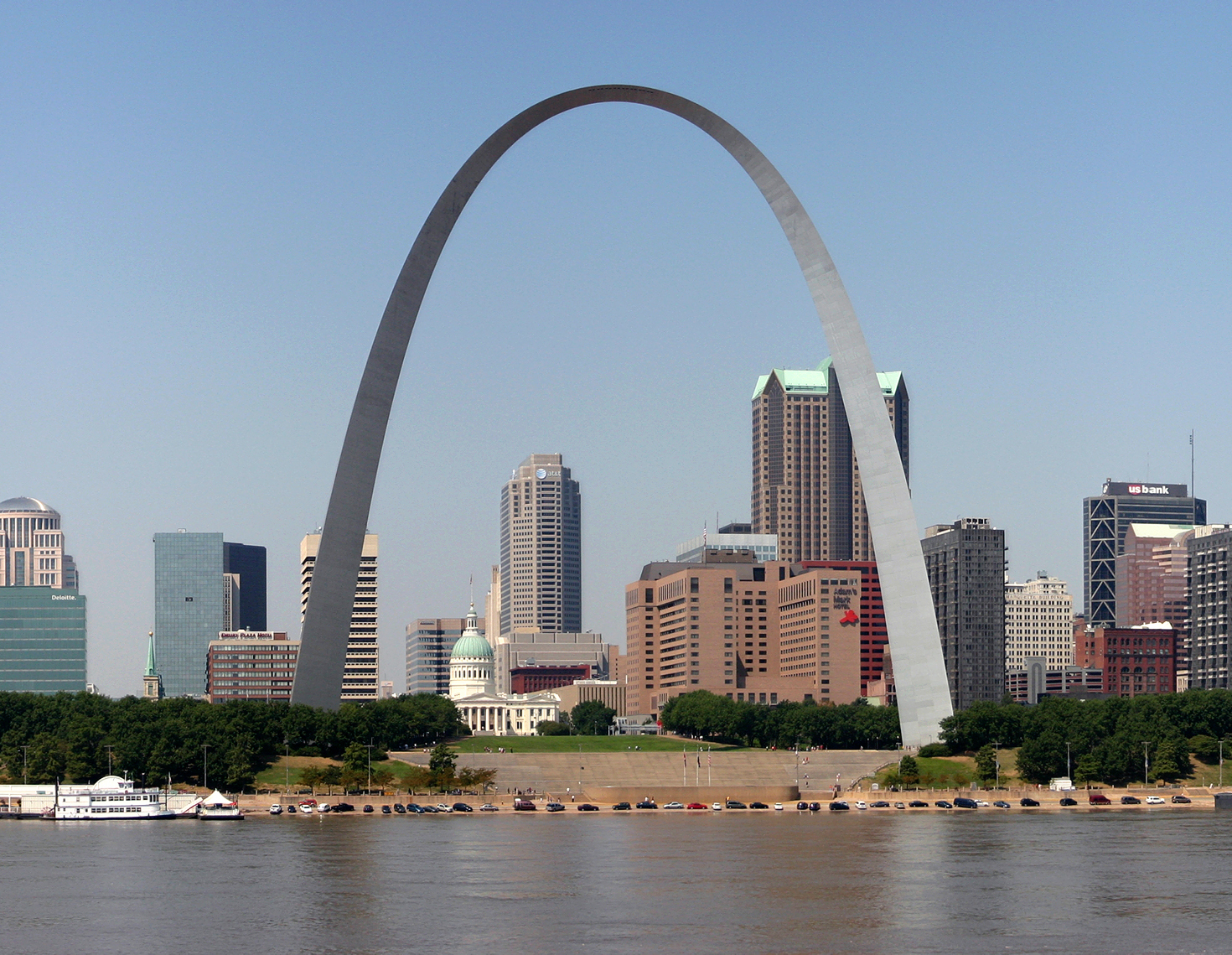
The arch in September 2007

On June 16, 1965, the Federal Aviation Administration cautioned that aviators who flew through the arch would be fined and their licenses revoked. At least ten pilots have disobeyed this order, beginning on June 22, 1966.

In 1973, Nikki Caplan was granted an FAA exception to fly a hot air balloon between the arch's legs as part of the Great Forest Park Balloon Race. During the flight, on which the St. Louis park director was a passenger, the balloon hit the arch and plummeted 70 feet before recovering.

In 1976, a US Army exhibition skydiving team was permitted to fly through the arch as part of Fourth of July festivities, and since then, numerous skydiving exhibition teams have legally jumped onto the Arch grounds, after having flown their parachutes through the legs of the Arch.

The arch has been a target of various stunt performers, and while such feats are generally forbidden, several people have parachuted to or from the arch regardless. In June 1980, the National Park Service declined a request by television producers to have a performer jump from the arch; a similar appeal by stuntman Dan Koko was also turned away in February 1986. Koko, who was a stunt double for Superman, wanted to perform the leap during Fourth of July celebrations.

On November 22, 1980, at about 8:45 a.m. CST, 33-year-old Kenneth Swyers of Overland, Missouri, parachuted onto the top of the arch. He had planned to release his main parachute and then jump off the arch using his reserve parachute to perform a base jump, but he instead fell to his death. Swyers was reportedly blown to the top of the arch by the wind and was unable to save himself when his reserve parachute failed to deploy. The Federal Aviation Administration said the jump was unauthorized. On December 27, 1980, St. Louis television station KTVI reported receiving calls from supposed witnesses of another stunt landing, reportedly as an act of homage to Swyers. Authorities later declared the jump a hoax; arch officials said they did not witness any such jump, and photos provided by the alleged parachutist were unclear.

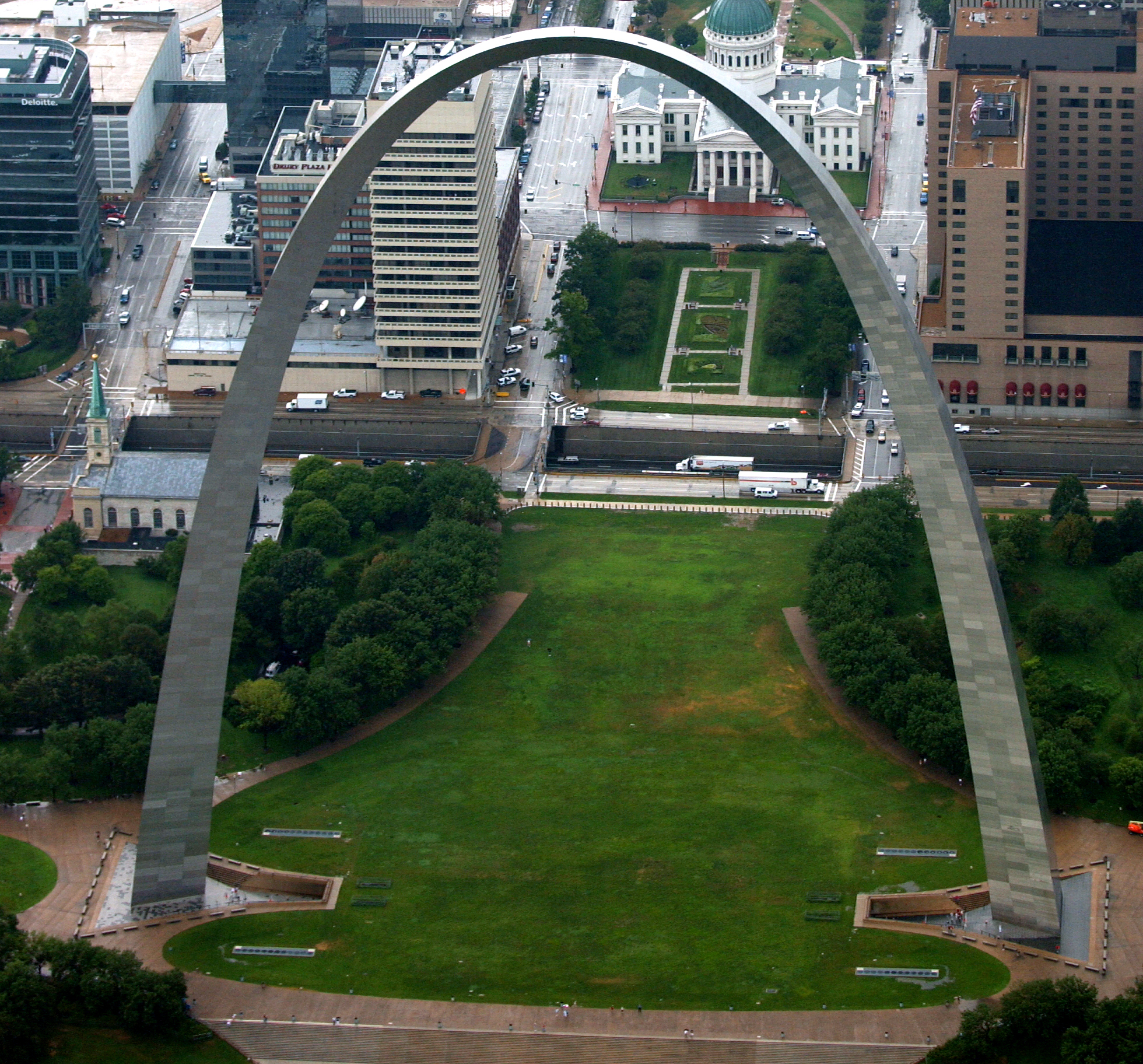
Aerial shot of the arch

On September 14, 1992, 25-year-old John C. Vincent of Harvey, Louisiana, climbed to the top of the Gateway Arch using suction cups and proceeded to parachute back to the ground. He was later charged with two misdemeanors: climbing a national monument and parachuting in a national park. Two St. Louis residents, Ronald Carroll and Robert Weinzetl, were found with a wireless communication headset, a video camera, and a still camera with a telephoto lens. They were also charged with two misdemeanors: disorderly conduct and commercial photography in a national park. Vincent accepted a guilty plea deal in which he testified against Carroll and Weinzetl; while Carroll was found guilty of both misdemeanor charges, the charges against Weinzetl were dropped by federal prosecutors.

=== Security ===
Two years after the 1995 Oklahoma City bombing, a little over $1 million was granted to institute a counterterrorism program. Park officials were trained to note the activity of tourists, and inconspicuous electronic detection devices were installed. After the September 11 attacks in 2001, security efforts became more prominent and security checkpoints moved to the entrance of the visitor center. At the checkpoints, visitors are screened by magnetometers and x-ray equipment, devices which have been in place since 1997.

The Arch also became one of several US monuments placed under restricted airspace during 2002 Fourth of July celebrations. In 2003, 10-foot-long (3.0 m), 32-inch-high (81 cm), 4,100-pound (1,900 kg) movable Jersey barriers were installed to impede terrorist attacks on the arch. Later that year, it was announced that these walls were to be replaced by concrete posts encased in metal to be more harmonious with the steel color of the arch. The movable bollards can be manipulated from the park's dispatch center, which has also been upgraded.

In 2006, arch officials hired a "physical security specialist", replacing a law enforcement officer. The responsibilities of the specialist include risk assessment, testing the park's security system, increasing security awareness of other employees, and working with other government agencies to improve the arch's security procedures.

== Symbolism and culture ==
The Gateway Arch packs a significant symbolic wallop just by standing there. But the Arch has a mission greater than being visually affecting. Its shape and monumental size suggest movement through time and space, and invite inquiry into the complex, fascinating story of our national expansion.

— Robert W. Duffy of the St. Louis Post-Dispatch, October 4, 2003

Built as a monument to the westward expansion of the United States, the arch typifies "the pioneer spirit of the men and women who won the West, and those of a latter day to strive on other frontiers." The arch has become the iconic image of St. Louis, appearing in many parts of city culture. In 1968, three years after the monument's opening, the St. Louis phone directory contained 65 corporations with "Gateway" in their title and 17 with "Arch". Arches also appeared over gas stations and drive-in restaurants. In the 1970s, a local sports team adopted the name "Fighting Arches"; St. Louis Community College would later (when consolidating all athletic programs under a single banner) name its sports teams "Archers". Robert S. Chandler, an NPS superintendent, said, "Most [visitors] are awed by the size and scale of the Arch, but they don't understand what it's all about ... Too many people see it as just a symbol of the city of St. Louis."

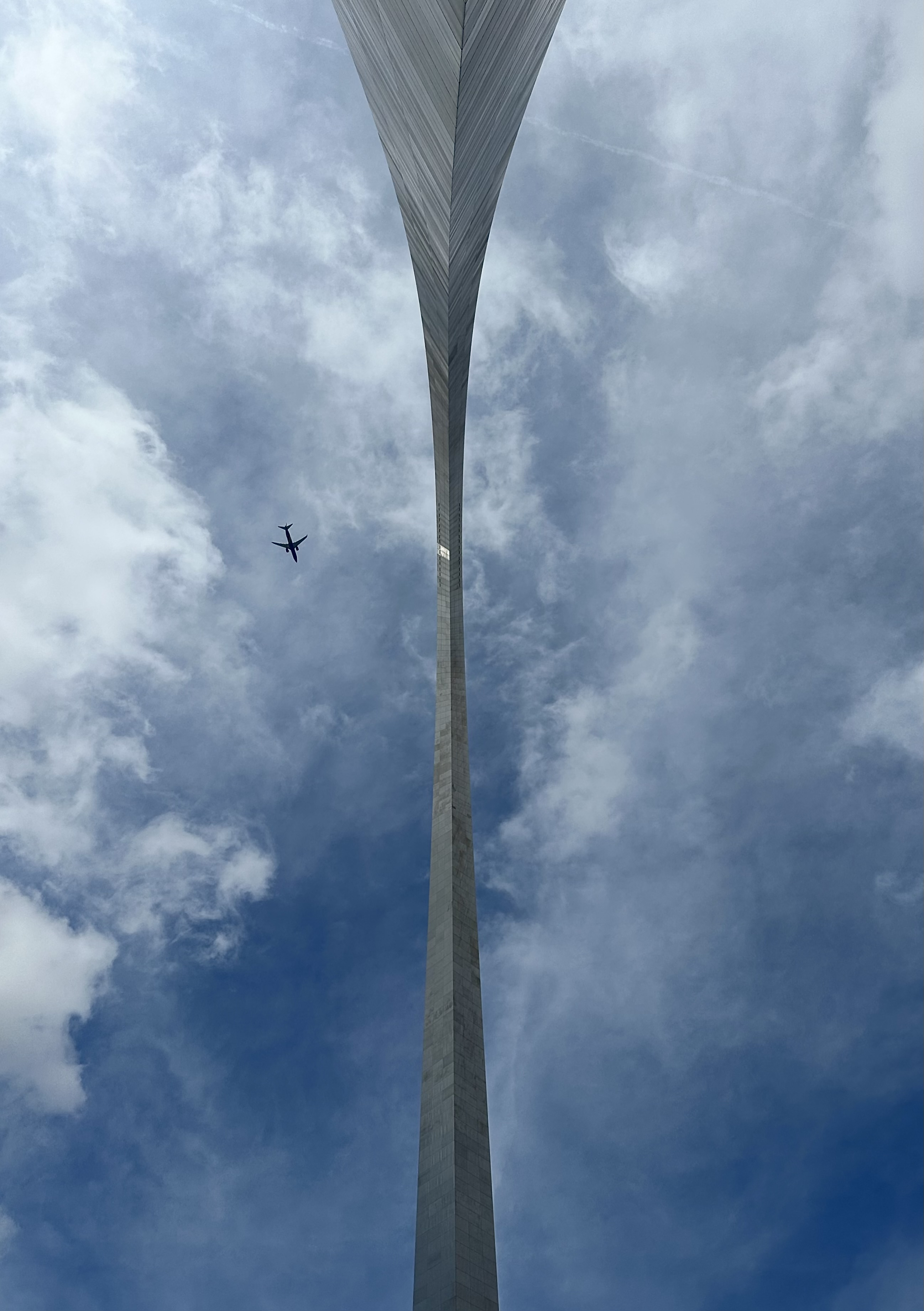
Underside view of the arch from the southern leg

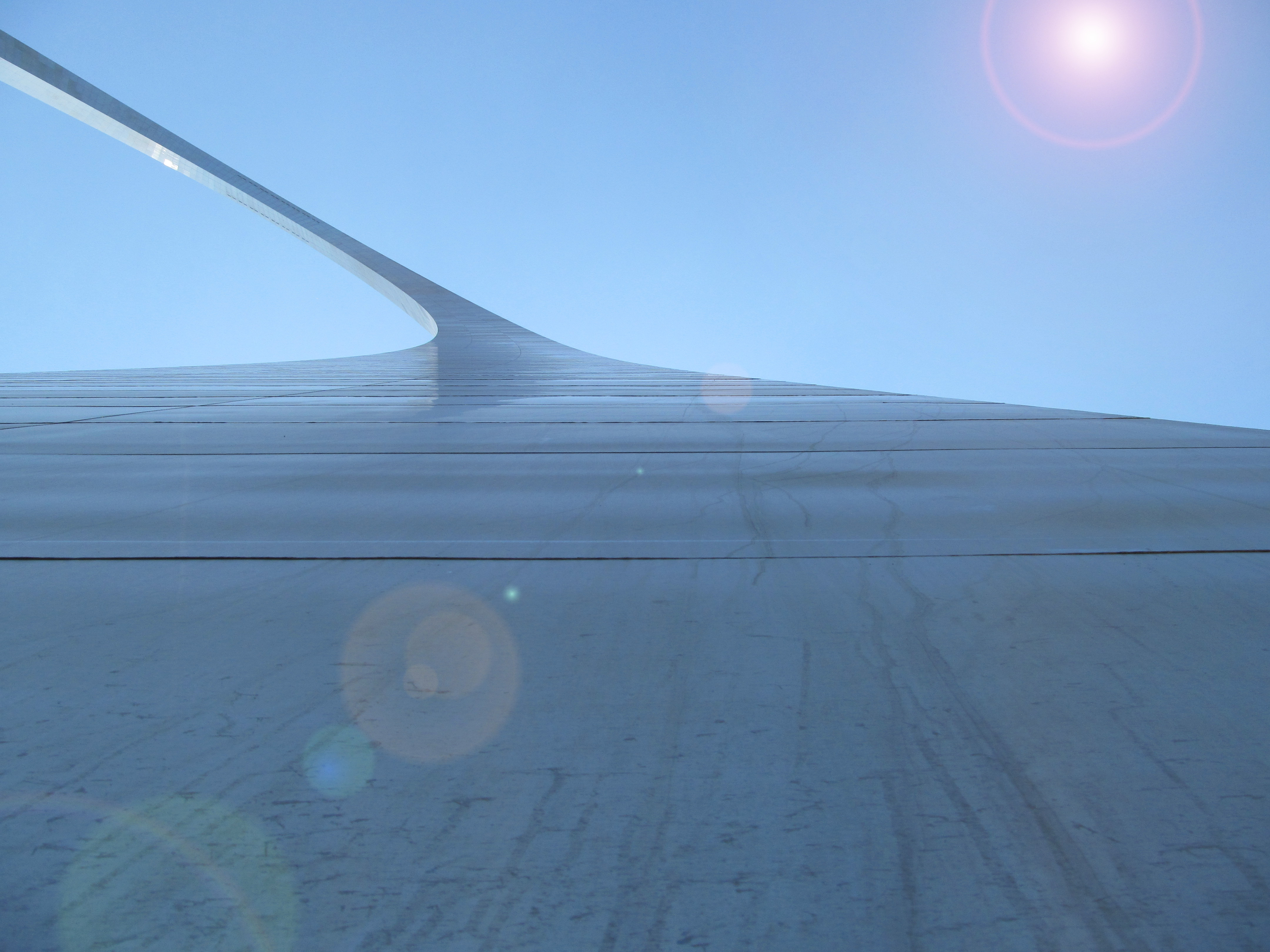
The Gateway Arch as seen from southern leg

The arch has also appeared as a symbol of the State of Missouri. On November 22, 2002, at the Missouri State Capitol, Lori Hauser Holden, wife of then Governor Bob Holden, uncovered the winning design for a Missouri coin design competition as part of the Fifty States Commemorative Coin Program. Designed by watercolorist Paul Jackson, the coin portrays "three members of the Lewis and Clark Expedition paddling a boat on the Missouri River upon returning to St. Louis" with the arch as the backdrop. Holden said that the arch was "a symbol for the entire state ... Four million visitors each year see the Arch. [The coin] will help make it even more loved worldwide." (Note: The US Mint altered Jackson's design to make it less "off balance," however, with three people in the canoe instead of just Lewis and Clark. A Mint representative said the third person was Clark's slave, York. The finalized coin entered circulation on August 4, 2003.) A special license plate designed by Arnold Worldwide featured the arch, labeled with "Gateway to the West." Profits earned from selling the plates would fund the museum and other educational components of the arch.

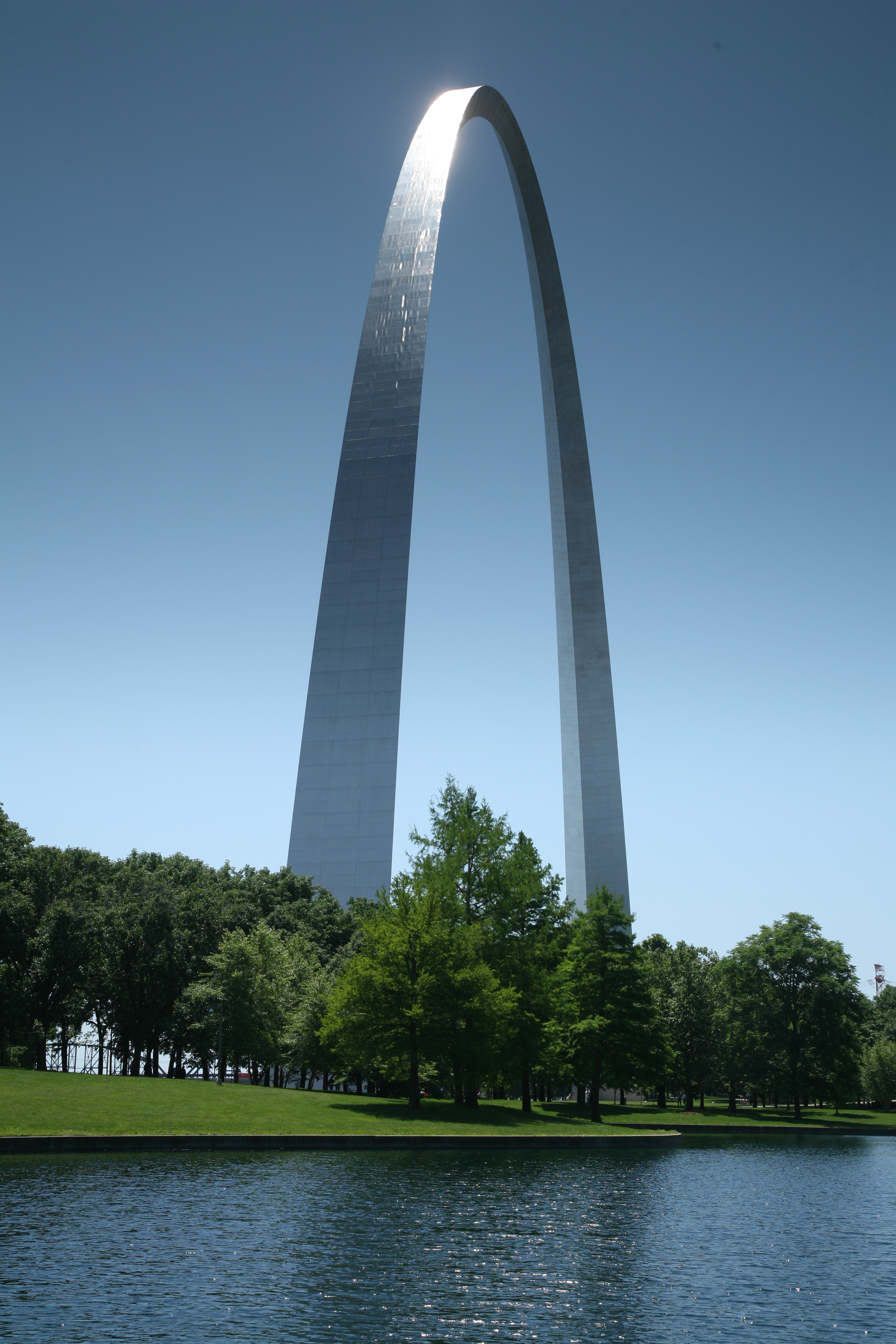
The Arch viewed from one of two reflecting pools

Louchheim wrote that although the arch "has a simplicity which should guarantee timeliness", it is entirely modern as well because of the innovative design and its scientific considerations. In The Dallas Morning News, architectural critic David Dillon opined that the arch exists not as a functional edifice but as a symbol of "boundless American optimism". He articulates the arch's multiple "moods"—"reflective in sunlight, soft and pewterish in mist; crisp as a line drawing one moment, chimerical the next"—as a way the arch has "paid for itself many times over in wonder".

Some have questioned whether St. Louis really was—as Saarinen said—the "Gateway to the West". Kansas City-born "deadline poet" Calvin Trillin wrote,

I know you're thinking that there are considerable differences between T.S. Eliot and me. Yes, it is true that he was from St. Louis, which started calling itself the Gateway to the West after Eero Saarinen's Gateway Arch was erected, and I'm from Kansas City, where people think of St. Louis not as the Gateway to the West but as the Exit from the East.

With renovations in the 2010s of the visitor center, the message of the arch has been more inclusive in its historic perspective, highlighting the impact of colonialism and particularly Manifest Destiny of American frontierism on the environment, land and people of First Americans, as well as Native Mexicans. Furthermore exhibiting the urban history of the site and the struggle of its people, as well as of its construction workers for more rights, during the civil rights movement era.

Its futuristic style has been seen as a symbol for the automobile age and the surrounding automobile centric urban and interstate infrastructure, promising a technological future of a new accessible frontier. This outlook has seen continuation, lending the Gateway Arch's iconic shape and meaning to the name and logo of the future Lunar Gateway, with its purpose as a gateway to the Moon and Mars.

A common local joke refers to the "Arch effect" or "activating the Arch", where the speaker facetiously claims that the Arch can be activated or otherwise serve as a method to deflect severe weather from the St. Louis metropolitan area.

=== Awards and recognitions ===
In 1966, the arch was given a Special Award for Excellence from the American Institute of Steel Construction for being "an outstanding achievement in technology and aesthetics." On February 9, 1967, the arch received the Outstanding Civil Engineering Achievement Award of 1967 from the American Society of Civil Engineers. The arch was once among Travel + Leisure's unofficial rankings for the most-visited attraction in the world, after Lenin's Tomb, Disney World, Disneyland, and the Eiffel Tower. On February 22, 1990, the arch received the American Institute of Architects' (AIA) Twenty-Five Year Award for its "enduring significance that has withstood the test of time." It was declared "a symbolic bridge between East and West, past and future, engineering and art" that "embodies the boundless optimism of a growing nation." In 2007, the arch was ranked fourteenth on the AIA's "America's Favorite Architecture" list.

=== Cultural references ===
- Dutch composer Peter Schat wrote a 1997 work, Arch Music for St. Louis, Op. 44. for the St. Louis Symphony Orchestra. It premiered on January 8, 1999, at the Powell Symphony Hall. Since Schat did not ascend the arch due to his fear of heights, he used his creativity to depict in music someone riding a tram to the top of the arch.
- Paul Muldoon's poem, "The Stoic", is set under the Gateway Arch. The work, "an elegy for a miscarried foetus", describes Muldoon's ordeal standing under the Gateway Arch after his wife telephoned and informed him that the baby they were expecting had been miscarried.
- Percy Jackson encounters Echidna and the Chimera in the Gateway Arch in The Lightning Thief and its television adaptation, after he, Grover Underwood, and Annabeth Chase visit the Arch during their trip to California to recover the Master Bolt. Percy faces the Chimera, jumps over 700 feet (200 m) out of the Arch, and falls into the Mississippi River.
- A damaged Gateway Arch is prominently featured in Defiance, a science fiction television series. The apex is used as a radio station studio, with the arch itself acting as the station's antenna.
- The Gateway Arch appears as an explorable location in the video game Starfield, as a landmark on an inhospitable Earth. A collectible snow globe found at the location also depicts the Arch.

== Maintenance ==
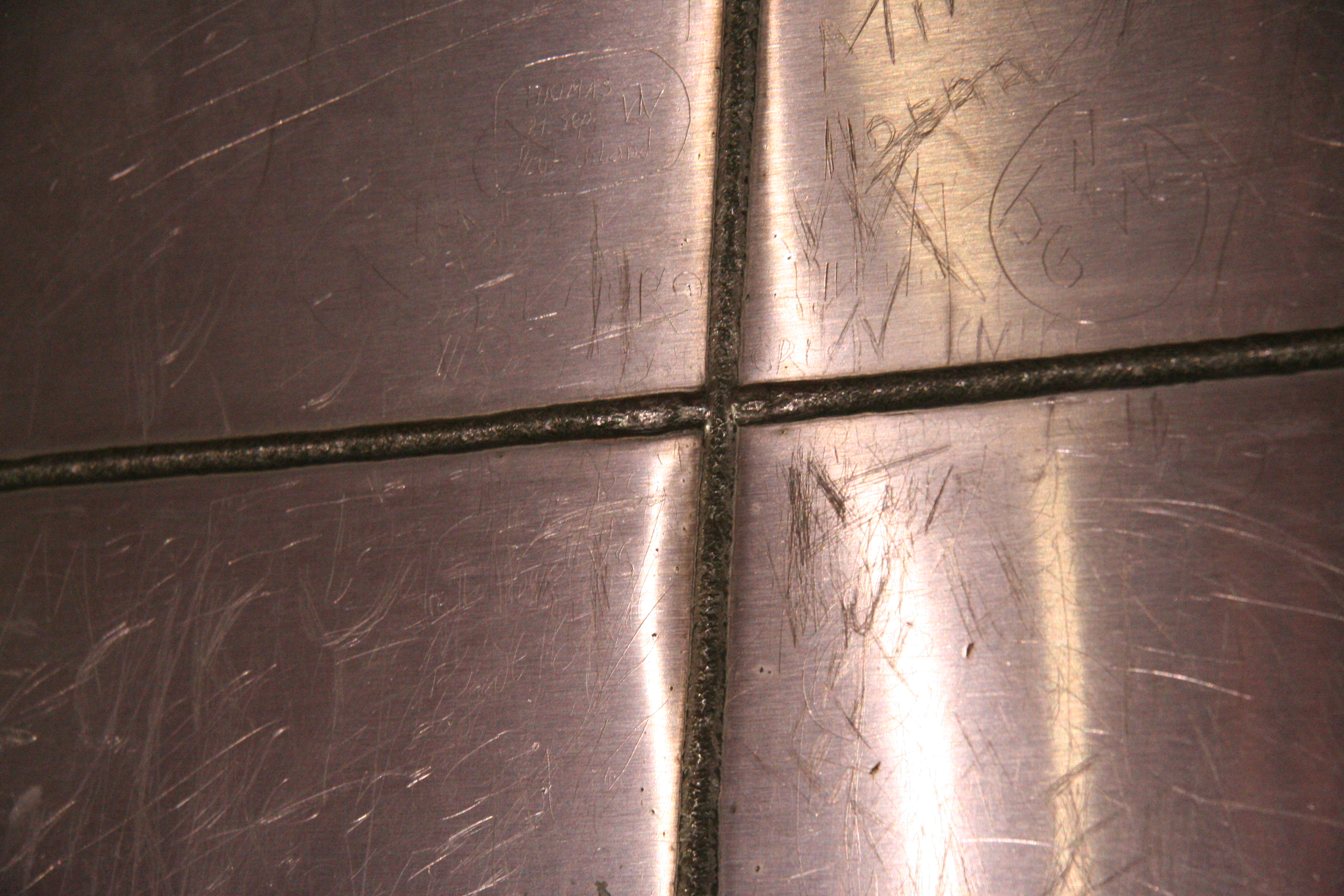
Welds on the arch's skin seal gaps between 4 by 8 ft (1.2 by 2.4 m) sheets of stainless steel. Graffiti is scratched on the lower 5 to 7 ft (1.5 to 2.1 m) of the monument.

The first act of vandalism was committed in June 1968: the vandals etched their names on various parts of the arch. In all, $10,000 was spent that year to repair damage from vandalism. The arch was first targeted by graffiti artists on March 5, 1969.

In 2010, signs of corrosion were reported at the upper regions of the stainless steel surface. Carbon steel in the north leg has been rusting, possibly a result of water accumulation, a side effect of leaky welds in an environment that often causes rain to enter the skin of the structure. Maintenance workers use mops and a temporary setup of water containers to ease the problem. According to NPS documents, the corrosion and rust pose no safety concerns.

A more comprehensive study of the corrosion had been suggested as early as 2006 by architectural specialists studying the Arch, and reiterated in a 2010 Historic Structure Report. In September 2010, the NPS granted Wiss, Janney, Elstner Associates, Inc. a contract for a structural study that would "gather data about the condition of the Arch to enable experts to develop and implement the right long-term solutions."

Stain samples were taken from the west face of the Arch on October 21, 2014, to determine the best way to clean it. The cleaning will cost about $340,000.

In 1984, structural engineer Tibor Szegezdy told Smithsonian Magazine that the Arch could stand "considerably less than a thousand years" before collapsing in a wind storm.

== Brickline Greenway ==
The Brickline Greenway Project is a major public-private partnership that aims to connect Forest Park and the Washington University in St. Louis Danforth Campus to the Gateway Arch grounds. Among the partners leading this project are Great Rivers Greenway, the Arch to Park Collaborative, St. Louis City, and Washington University in St. Louis. The Brickline Greenway was known as the Chouteau Greenway prior to March 10, 2020.

== See also ==
- Architecture of St. Louis
- Fair Saint Louis
- List of tallest buildings in St. Louis
- List of National Historic Landmarks in Missouri
- National Register of Historic Places listings in St. Louis, Missouri
- Zhivopisny Bridge

== Bibliography ==
- AECOM (May 2010). "Cultural Landscape Report" (PDF). National Park Service. Archived from the original on November 7, 2012. Alt URL
- Baglione, Chiara (June 2015), Eero Saarinen – Gateway to the West, 1947–1965, "Casabella", 850, June 2015, 4–27, 94–95 [English text].
- Bahr Vermeer Haecker Architects; Wiss, Janney, Elstner Associates; Alvine and Associates (June 2010). "Historic Structure Report" (PDF). National Park Service. Archived from the original on November 7, 2012. Alt URL
- Brown, Sharon A. (June 1984). Administrative History: Jefferson National Expansion Memorial National Historic Site. National Park Service.
- Campbell, Tracy (2013). The Gateway Arch: A Biography. New Haven: Yale University Press.
- Tackett, Michael (October 26, 1990). "The Arch at 25: Gateway Gave St. Louis a Much-Needed Identity". Moscow-Pullman Daily News. p. 4D. Archived from the original on March 9, 2021.
