= Paul Jackson (artist) =

American artist

- Born: 1968 (age 57–58); Lawrence, Kansas, U.S.
- Education: B.F.A. Painting, Mississippi State University
- Known for: Painting (Watercolor)

Paul Jackson is an American watercolor artist based in Missouri. He is well known for his large-scale works. His studio, The Avalanche Ranch, is in Columbia, Missouri. Jackson was inducted as a signature member into the American Watercolor Society at the age of 30, and he is a signature member of the National Watercolor Society. His work has received top honors in national and international competition.

== Awards and honors ==
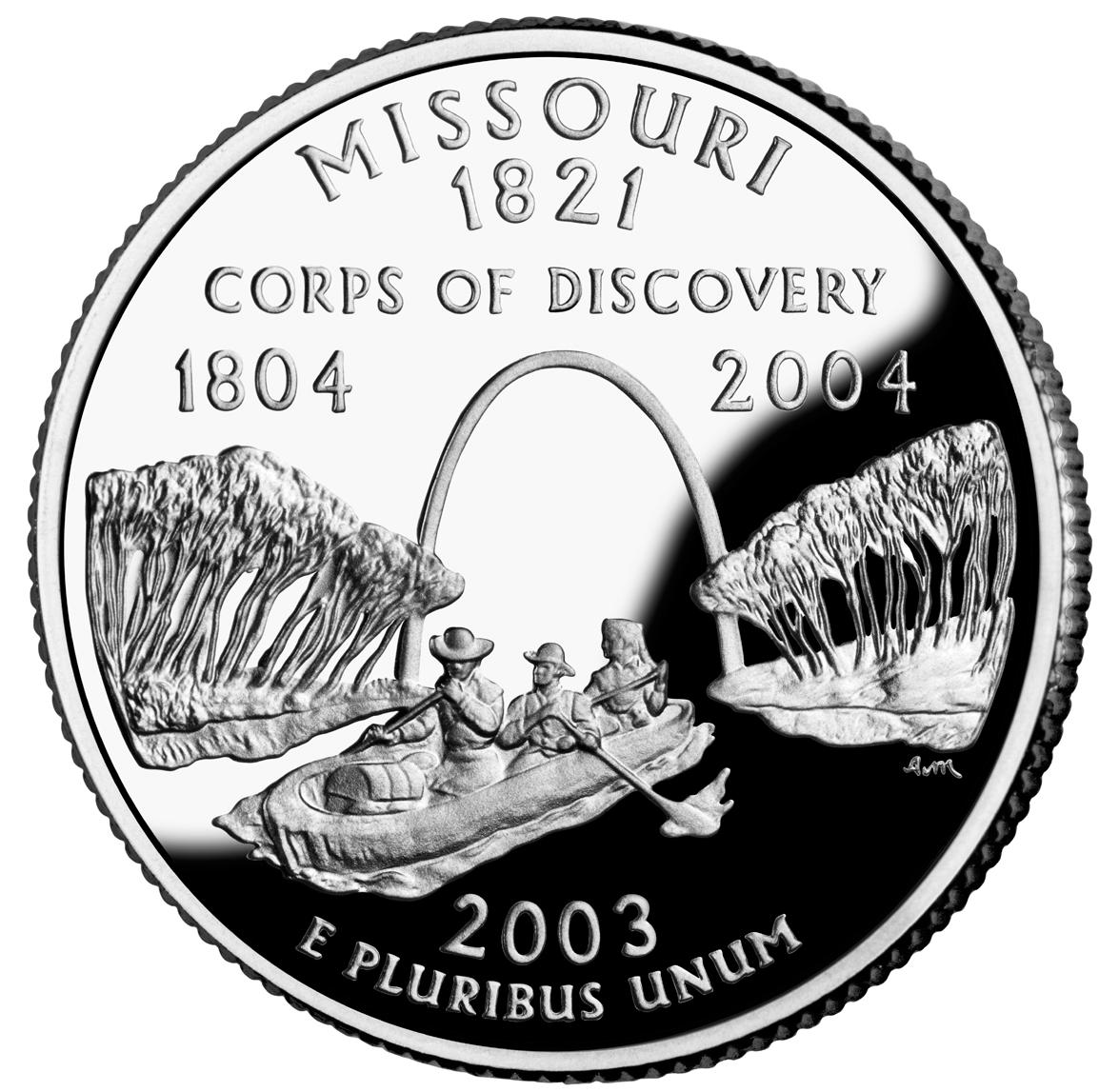
His design won the competition for the Missouri State Quarter

An abbreviated list of some awards and honors include:

- Walser Greathouse Medal – American Watercolor Society
- Best of Show – Northwest Watercolor Society National Exhibition
- Winsor & Newton Award – National Watercolor Society
- Designed the White House Easter Egg (x 3)
- Designed Missouri's Commemorative State Quarter
- Created "Spot," a 30' diameter tiger mosaic & led more than a thousand volunteers in its 420,000 tile construction at the University of Missouri, Columbia
- Invited to the Invitational Exhibition of Contemporary International Watermedia Masters in China
- In 2009 Paul served as the invited juror for the American Watercolor Society's 142nd annual international exhibition.
- Paul was also the only American artist invited to the International Art Meet in Kolkata, India in 2011
- In 2014 he was an invited instructor for Istanbul Watercolor Society, Istanbul, Turkey
- Created Bright Lights of Budapest, Paul's largest watercolor to date, a 5x10-foot commissioned watercolor work now in a private collection.

== Tiger Spot ==
Paul Jackson's Tiger Spot was completed and unveiled in October 2001 but the mosaic began to show signs of wear that were likely due to weather. A consultant concluded the mosaic was not built properly. The mosaic was covered by a circular tarp in 2007 and the University of Missouri-Columbia spent $112,508.63 attempting to sustain it. Jackson sued the University in 2011. The lawsuit settled in 2012 with Jackson receiving $125,000 to dismiss the litigation.

== Books ==
- Painting Spectacular Light Effects in Watercolor
- The Wandering Watercolorist

== Sources ==
- Hales, Linda (September 2, 2002). "A Controversy Is Coined Over Series of Quarters". Los Angeles Times.
- Local watercolor artist invited to exhibit in China. Columbia Daily Tribune.
- Watercolor winners named at CAL show. Columbia Daily Tribune.
- Artist to give mosaic of tiger to university. Columbia Daily Tribune.
- Studio of Dreams - Paul Jackson has opened a gallery in Columbia.... Columbia Daily Tribune.
