= History of St. Louis (1905–1980) =

The history of St. Louis, Missouri, from 1905 to 1980 saw declines in population and economic basis, particularly after World War II. Although St. Louis made civic improvements in the 1920s and enacted pollution controls in the 1930s, suburban growth accelerated and the city population fell dramatically from the 1950s to the 1980s. Like many urban areas, St. Louis experienced high unemployment during the Great Depression, then expanded its industrial base during World War II. The city became home to Gateway Arch National Park (then known as the Jefferson National Expansion Memorial) during the 1930s, and during the 1960s the Gateway Arch was built on the memorial grounds. St. Louis City and St. Louis County made multiple attempts at consolidation during the period, but none were particularly successful. Despite attempts at urban renewal that included public housing projects such as the Pruitt-Igoe complex, the city continued to lose population to county cities.

== Civic improvements and pollution control ==
Starting in 1903, local civic groups began building small parks and playgrounds in deteriorating residential neighborhoods to promote free play and directed activities among youth; by 1909, St. Louis had gained 16 parks totaling more than 150 acres. Among the progressive social reformers on the city parks committee during this time was Charlotte Rumbold, who later was an officer of the Playground Association of America with Jane Addams. To encourage physical activity, Parks Commissioner Philip Scanlan ordered the construction of baseball fields and tennis courts in major St. Louis parks. Scanlan's successor, Dwight F. Davis, continued the development of recreational facilities during the early 1910s, expanding tennis facilities in particular. Davis also ordered construction of a public 18-hole golf course in northwest Forest Park, replacing an earlier semi-private 9-hole course.

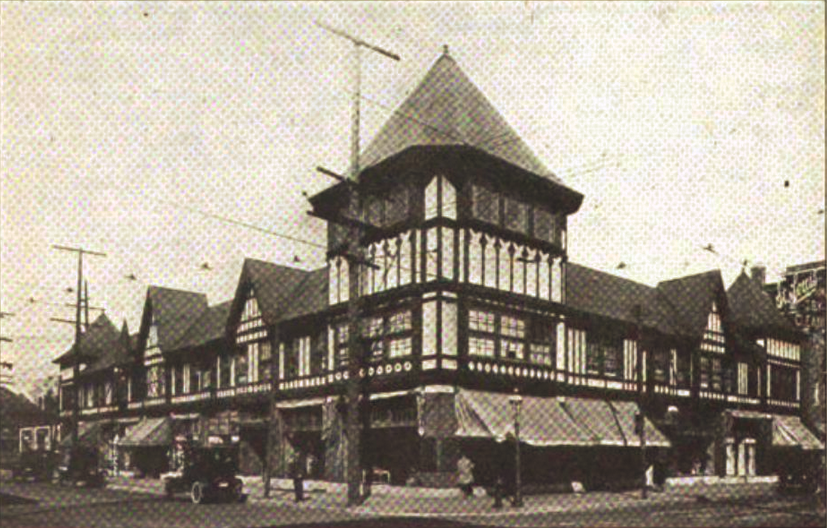
After establishment in 1912, the Woman's Auxiliary of the Presbyterian Church, U.S. was headquartered in the city's Field Building.

A zoo was first established during the 1870s at Fairground Park, but it closed in 1891 and its animals were sold to local collectors who then began housing them in Forest Park. Starting in 1910, the St. Louis Zoological Society was formed to collect money to purchase animals and lobby the city to reopen a zoo. After the election of Henry Kiel as mayor in 1913 (who supported the creation of the zoo), St. Louis supplied 77 acres of land in Forest Park for the creation of a zoo, and in October 1916, a zoo tax was passed to provide continual maintenance for the facility. In 1919, the zoo completed its bear pits, which were designed with the assistance of Carl Hagenbeck. In 1923, St. Louis passed an $87 million bond issue to fund civic improvements, the largest such city debt issue in the country at the time. The improvements came to infrastructure, parks, public safety, hospitals, and a downtown auditorium and plaza (known as Kiel Auditorium and Aloe Plaza). The bond issue also paid for the first ten blocks of what would become known as the Gateway Mall, a one-block wide park extending nearly uninterrupted from the riverfront some twenty blocks.

Since the 1890s, the St. Louis Board of Health had passed anti-smoke regulations, but little reduction was made in the problem of coal smoke pollution. In 1906, the St. Louis Public Library was forced to repair its collection due to smoke damage, by 1910 smoke pollution had killed trees in Forest Park, and during the 1920s, evergreens no longer grew near the city and the Missouri Botanical Garden was considering a move away from the city. Studies revealed that in 1926, St. Louis had an annual soot deposit of 870 tons per square mile, far above Chicago and Pittsburgh. Despite efforts at reducing pollution by washing coal prior to burning it, St. Louis smog continued unabated. Among the worst episodes was the 1939 St. Louis smog, which blackened the sky during the day of November 28 and lasted for three weeks.

Only a citywide ban in December 1939 on burning low-quality Illinois coal made a significant change in the pollution, forcing homeowners and businesses alike to switch to cleaner-burning Arkansas coal. The result of the ban was significant: during the winter of 1939–40, St. Louis experienced 177 hours of thick smoke pollution, while in the winter of 1940–1941, only 17 hours of thick smoke was reported. In addition, the Laclede Gas Company began to supply cleaner-burning natural gas to customers starting in 1941, which largely rectified the problem of smoke pollution by the late 1940s.

== Segregation and the East St. Louis Race Riot ==
After Reconstruction through 1900, St. Louis saw little of the racial violence that engulfed Southern states, due to the stability and relatively small size of the St. Louis black community. Most black residents lived in the northern edges of downtown along the riverfront or in the area of Chestnut Valley and Mill Creek Valley, near the wharf and railroads for employment. Municipal segregation laws (known as Jim Crow laws) were relatively inconsistent; while blacks could not enter white hotels, restaurants or barber shops, they could enter department store elevators with whites or attend St. Louis theater shows in separate sections. Streetcar seating also was integrated, and there were no efforts to enforce residential segregation prior to 1911.

In the early 1910s, however, predominantly white areas of St. Louis that bordered the black community formed the United Welfare Association (UWA), a group dedicated to lobbying for a segregation ordinance. Although the municipal government rejected the group's petitions, the UWA succeeded in gathering enough signatures for a direct initiative election on the ordinance in February 1916. The NAACP in St. Louis opposed the law by distributing pamphlets arguing that the ordinance was un-American and by filing a lawsuit against it that ultimately failed. 23 of 28 aldermen and Mayor Henry Kiel publicly opposed the ordinance, while both major dailies (the St. Louis Post-Dispatch and the St. Louis Globe-Democrat) wrote editorials against it.

In spite of the anti-segregationist opinions, St. Louisans overwhelmingly supported the ordinance at the polls, passing the first initiative-based segregation ordinance in the country by a vote of 52,220 to 17,877. Lower class white wards adjacent to the black community voted for segregation by a margin of eight to one, and the wealthy and elite Central West End voted in favor by four to one. Only predominantly black wards showed a majority in opposition. According to the law, no person could move onto a block where 75% of that block's inhabitants were of a different race. However, a court injunction filed by the NAACP invalidated the ordinance in April 1916, and after a Supreme Court decision in 1918, the injunction was made permanent. Although the ordinance was invalidated, private restrictive covenants began appearing in St. Louis real estate transactions that limited the ability of white owners to sell to blacks.

Concomitant with the segregation ordinance and the rise of restrictive covenants was the beginning of the Great Migration of African-Americans to northern cities. Many thousands moved to the city of East St. Louis, Illinois, where they often were employed at low wages as strikebreakers. Between June 30 and July 2, 1917, a violent race riot in East St. Louis broke out when a mob of white attackers (including police and National Guardsmen) destroyed 300 houses, wounded hundreds, and killed 39 blacks and 8 whites. Unofficial estimates placed the number of victims of the race riot far higher, but because many bodies were disposed of in the river, accurate counts were difficult. For its part, St. Louis was a haven during the riot, as St. Louis police shepherded fleeing blacks across the Eads Bridge to shelter and food provided by the city government and the American Red Cross.

Due to an influx of refugees from East St. Louis and the general effects of the Great Migration, the black population of St. Louis increased more rapidly than the whole during the decade of 1910 to 1920. However, St. Louis's overall population rank declined from the fourth largest in the United States to sixth.

== St. Louis in World War I ==
Upon the outbreak of World War I, the U.S. government maintained a neutral stance toward the belligerents; by the end of the war's first year, however, public opinion in St. Louis had shifted toward the Allies. St. Louis newspapers began running anti-German editorials, prompting the St. Louis German community to rally in support of neutrality, and starting in 1915, German cultural groups raised funds for German war widows. The St. Louis Irish community also joined in support of neutrality, primarily to oppose the British. However, public attacks on President Woodrow Wilson and the British caused divisions in the German community, and prominent German businessmen participated in Wilson's "Preparedness Day" parade on June 3, 1916.

In spite of this show of support for Wilson's policies, non-German St. Louisans began to embrace nativism and distrust the intentions of the Germans, especially after U.S. entry into the war in April 1917. Non-naturalized Germans were required to register as enemy aliens, German-language newspapers were censored, high schools ended the teaching of German, the St. Louis Symphony stopped playing German compositions, and the St. Louis Public Library removed German-language books from circulation. Two city streets were renamed: Berlin Avenue in the Central West End became Pershing, while Van Verson Avenue in the West End became Enright.

In addition, citizens began reporting suspicious conversations overhead on streetcars or public streets, submitting names for prosecution under the Espionage Act of 1917. Several German immigrants or members of the German-American community were arrested and charged for violations, and although some were freed, others remained imprisoned for the duration of the war. St. Louis commerce, for its part, was not dramatically affected by the war.

== Industry between the wars and the Great Depression ==
After World War I, the imposition of Prohibition meant that the St. Louis brewing industry suffered significant losses. Anheuser-Busch remained in business by selling malt syrup and Bevo, a legal near beer, while most brewers simply closed. Certain other industries filled the gap left by the brewers during the 1920s, including light manufacturing of shoes and garments (particularly along Washington Avenue and by companies such as Brown Shoe), electrical parts (by companies such as Emerson Electric), and automobile parts. The automobile industry in St. Louis included local brands such as Moon Motor Car and Gardner Motor Car, in addition to assembly plants for Ford and General Motors. Tobacco processing remained a significant industry in Mill Creek Valley, and St. Louis ranked seventh in the country in 1929 in value of its manufactured products.

St. Louis industry in 1929 had diversified a great deal since the late 19th century; in order of significance, St. Louis industry included food processing, chemical production, steelmaking, and clothing and shoe making. The industrial districts of St. Louis were readily identifiable due to the efforts of the Board of Health in the 1880s: the North Broadway area included lumber mills, Mallinckrodt Chemical, St. Louis Car Company, meatpacking houses, and railroad yards. South Broadway heavy industries included Anheuser-Busch, Monsanto, American Car and Foundry, and a railroad yard for the Iron Mountain Railroad. Extending west from downtown and south of Union Station were the yards for the Missouri Pacific and the Frisco, more meatpacking plants, and the Liggett and Myers tobacco factory. Downtown commerce and industries were mostly light manufacturing, major wholesalers and retailers, banks and insurance companies.

Despite St. Louis's diversified economy, it suffered as much or more than comparable cities in the early years of the Great Depression. The manufacturing output of St. Louis fell by 57 percent between 1929 and 1933, slightly more than the national average of 55 percent. By 1939, St. Louis was still at only 70 percent of its 1929 production levels, while national industrial production was up to 84 percent of its 1929 level. The return of the brewing industry after the repeal of Prohibition in 1933 was a bright spot in St. Louis industry, but this still was not enough to offset industrial production losses.

Unemployment in St. Louis
	1930	1931	1933
National average	8.7%	15.9%	24.9%
St. Louis (total)	9.8%	24%	30%
St. Louis (whites)	8.4%	21.5%	35%
St. Louis (blacks)	13.2%	42.8%	80%

Unemployment during the Depression was particularly significant in urban areas, and St. Louis was no exception (see table). Black workers suffered significantly higher unemployment, and they often were fired and replaced by white workers, especially after mandatory minimum wage laws took effect in the mid-1930s. In the meatpacking plants and steel mills, Black workers bore the brunt of labor force reductions; of 591 workers laid off in steel mills in 1931, 401 were Black. Many Blacks working in domestic service were paid only in room and board, while skilled Black craftsmen were unable to join local unions and were shut out of construction jobs. In other cases, minimum wages were not paid to black workers, who were blackmailed into averring that they were receiving the proper pay. In spite of the discrimination in the workplace, direct relief aid was provided equitably to Blacks in the city. After 1933, Blacks in the city voted overwhelming for the Democratic Party, a shift from their traditional support of the Republican Party.

During the early years of the Depression from 1930 to 1932, the city allocated $1.5 million of its funds toward relief operations, while the Salvation Army and the St. Vincent de Paul Society provided another $2 million. In late 1932, St. Louis voters passed a $4.6 million bond issue to provide more relief funds, and in the spring of 1933, Mayor Bernard Dickmann and the Board of Aldermen balanced the city budget by reducing expenditures by 11 percent. Federal relief programs began contributing funds in May 1933, but St. Louis issued a second bond for relief funds in February 1935 for $3.6 million. Of the $68 million spent on relief in St. Louis from 1932 to 1936, $50 million came from the federal government, $12 million came from the city and local agencies, and only $6 million from the state.

In addition to providing aid for food and shelter, New Deal programs such as the Public Works Administration employed thousands of St. Louisans. Civic improvement bond issues for airport construction and the remainder of the 1923 bond issue construction program also contributed to lowering unemployment. Another bond issue for improvements came in 1934, providing funds for city beautification and renovations on civic buildings, reducing the number of persons on direct relief aid to 35,000 in 1936 from more than 100,000 in 1933.

== St. Louis in World War II ==
Shortly after the attack on Pearl Harbor by the Japanese in 1941, St. Louisans began preparing for an attack in the area by sending soldiers to protect local military and munitions installations, including the St. Louis Army Ammunition Plant at Goodfellow and Bircher, Lambert Field, and the Curtiss-Wright aircraft factory. St. Louis police were employed to protect bridges, while workers at military factories were checked to protect against sabotage. Other security measures included the interrogation or arrest of German, Italian, and Japanese persons, including naturalized citizens. Several local Japanese restaurants were closed, and at the Bridlespur Hunt Club in Huntleigh, Missouri, the manager (a Japanese man who had lived in the United States since 1904) was arrested. St. Louis labor leaders organized boycotts of products made by the Axis powers, and bonfires were lit of Japanese-made products. In the spring and summer of 1942, the Federal Bureau of Investigation (FBI) made several high-profile arrests or investigations in St. Louis, including one into a pastor in Chesterfield, Missouri who was accused of sedition for condemning lynchings and openly opposing the playing of the Star Spangled Banner in church.

Fears of a Japanese hit-and-run air raid mounted in the weeks after Pearl Harbor, although at the beginning of the war, St. Louis had no air raid sirens and little plans in case of an attack. In spite of its distance from the coasts, city leaders appropriated $50,000 for area defense, including $4,500 to light the MacArthur Bridge. Call-in radio shows were cancelled, and weather forecasts were censored. Civil defense preparations both in the city and county moved slowly, but on March 7, 1942, the city held its first blackout. A second blackout, held in February 1943, was considerably more successful than the first, with 4 of 12 civil defense districts fully blacked out. The local branch of the federal Office of Civilian Defense enrolled 5,300 air raid wardens, 2,400 volunteer firefighters, and 3,000 volunteer police officers by April 1942. City building inspectors selected 200 sites as air raid shelters, enough to house 40,000 people, and local schools began preparing students for attack. The city and region also were protected by anti-aircraft guns, but mistakenly fired on civilian aircraft multiple times during the war.

St. Louis industry had already begun preparing for war starting in 1940, when the government placed a $16 million order with Curtiss-Wright aircraft company for training and cargo planes. In October 1940, a $14 million order for high explosives led to the construction of the Atlas Powder Company factory in Weldon Spring, Missouri. The largest war industry plant, however, was the U.S. Cartridge-owned ammunition factory at Goodfellow and Bircher in north St. Louis, which at its peak employed more than 35,000 St. Louisans and produced more than one billion rounds of ammunition a year. Monsanto converted entirely to war production, producing chemicals used in the making of TNT, chlorine gas, and sulfa compounds that treated infections. By the end of the war, more than 75 percent of St. Louis manufacturers had engaged in defense work, including the making of various types of ordnance and weapons, uniforms and footwear, K-rations, and chemicals and medical drugs. The uranium used in the Manhattan Project was refined in St. Louis by Mallinckrodt Chemical Company, starting in 1942, and several atomic bomb scientists had ties to St. Louis, including Arthur Compton. In 1944, the St. Louis Chevrolet factory began producing DUKWs and other amphibious vehicles for the invasion of Normandy, while tank and airplane manufacturing continued at a rapid pace.

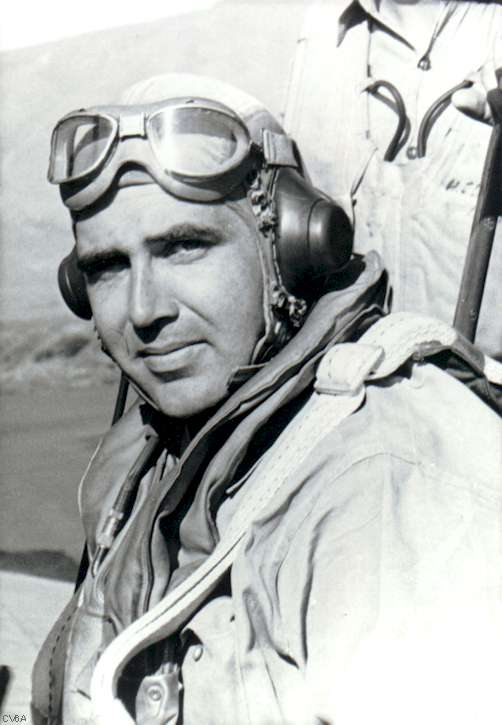
Edward "Butch" O'Hare was a well-known St. Louis flying ace who was awarded the Medal of Honor.

During the war, St. Louis produced several notable soldiers, including Edward O'Hare, who grew up in St. Louis and attended Western Military Academy in Alton, Illinois, followed by acceptance to the United States Naval Academy. During a combat flight in the Pacific in February 1942, O'Hare shot down five Japanese bombers that were on a run to attack the USS Lexington, for which he was awarded the Medal of Honor and a parade in St. Louis. St. Louis also was home to Wendell O. Pruitt, an African-American pilot who shot down three enemy aircraft and multiple ground targets in June 1944. St. Louis celebrated Pruitt's achievement by naming December 12, 1944 "Captain Wendell O. Pruitt Day". In addition, more than 5400 St. Louisans became casualties of the war, listed as either missing in action or killed in action.

Among the first products to be rationed in St. Louis (and in the United States) was rubber, particularly tires, and by January 1, 1942, the St. Louis Rationing Board began regulating tire sales. St. Louis's tire quota for January 1942 was 2,154, which was mostly allocated toward emergency vehicles; home deliveries from stores virtually ceased, while high schools dropped spring sports for lack of tires to travel. Sugar rationing followed in May, and gasoline purchases were limited in the fall of 1942. Scrap drives were common in St. Louis, and in January 1943, scrap seekers attempted to uncover the remains of the ferris wheel that had been demolished after the end of the 1904 World's Fair. By 1943, meat and dairy products were in short supply in St. Louis, and milk supplies were inconsistent. St. Louis also was the first U.S. city to reach its war bond quota goal in both 1942 and 1943. However, during the 1944 bond campaigns, St. Louis was far behind the national average, and only reached its goal after a one-week extension.

At the outbreak of war, African-American St. Louisans gained greater acceptance in industry than they had previously. By the end of 1942, nearly 8,000 black men and women were hired in St. Louis industries, but employment discrimination remained a significant problem for the community. Most jobs in war factories were unskilled, although some factories, notably Scullin Steel, hired significant numbers of skilled black workers. The April 1943 municipal elections were significant for the civil rights movement, as the first African-American was elected to the St. Louis Board of Aldermen, Rev. Jasper C. Caston. In the same election, the first woman was elected to the Board, Clara Hempelmann.

The war also was responsible for the first city integration ordinance, which passed the Board of Aldermen in March 1944 and allowed African-Americans to eat at city-owned (but not private ) lunch counters. In May 1944, a black sailor in uniform was refused service at a downtown lunch counter; in response, members of the Citizens Civil Rights Committee of St. Louis organized a sit-in on May 18, 1944, at a drugstore lunch counter in downtown. The peaceful protesters were carried out, and subsequent sit-ins at Stix, Baer, Fuller department store lunch counters also ended with the removal of protesters. No changes in Jim Crow segregation policies at lunch counters resulted; however, Saint Louis University admitted its first black students starting in the fall of 1944.

In 1943, several hundred German prisoners of war were held in St. Louis, along with thousands of Italians were held in Weingarten, Missouri. The prisoners were used as emergency labor during spring flooding of the Mississippi in May 1943 to fill and lay sandbags, although the flooding required the intervention of local military forces. In spite of this, flooding overtopped levees and created problems in north St. Louis along the riverfront. It was also during 1943 that St. Louis Mayor William D. Becker and ten others were killed in a glider accident that resulted from a wing strut support failure. Becker's replacement, Aloys Kaufmann, was the last Republican elected mayor through the reelection of Francis G. Slay in 2009.

The end of the war in Europe, marked by Victory in Europe Day, meant that many St. Louis war factories would close. The Red Cross and the Office of Civil Defense began laying off workers in early May, and nearly 20,000 defense workers were laid off within a week after V-E Day. U.S. Cartridge laid off 4,000 workers in mid-May, while Curtiss-Wright laid off 11,000 employees in early June 1945. Returning St. Louis soldiers founded the first American Legion post consisting of World War II veterans in south St. Louis in the spring of 1945, but many found St. Louis to have a chronic housing and job shortage by late 1945. The surrender of Japan in August 1945 meant the cancellation of $250 million in war contracts in St. Louis, while 80,000 St. Louisans lost their jobs immediately, causing temporary economic problems in the region. Among the most significant and lasting effects of the war came about due to the passage of the GI Bill, which allowed veterans to purchase homes in St. Louis County and causing a population exodus from St. Louis City.

== Suburbanization and population loss ==
Population of St. Louis City
Year	Pop.	±%
1900	575,238	—
1910	687,029	+19.4%
1920	772,897	+12.5%
1930	821,960	+6.3%
1940	816,048	−0.7%
1950	856,796	+5.0%
1960	750,026	−12.5%
1970	622,236	−17.0%
1980	452,801	−27.2%
1990	396,685	−12.4%
2000	348,189	−12.2%
2010	319,294	−8.3%
Source: "U.S. Census website". United States Census Bureau.

Internal population migration westward was a feature of St. Louis growth since its earliest days, but it accelerated rapidly in the early 20th century. German Jewish immigrants, who had mainly come to St. Louis in the decades after the Civil War, began moving to wealthy west end of St. Louis, while Eastern European Jewish immigrants began moving to areas in northwest St. Louis and into Wellston and University City, Missouri. Italians at first had congregated in a "Little Italy" located in the Columbus Square neighborhood, but starting in the 1910s and 1920s large numbers of Italians (primarily from Milan, Lombardy, and Piedmont) began moving to an area west of Kingshighway and south of Forest Park, known as The Hill. This area, five miles from downtown, was distant enough from the city that the group maintained cultural identity and was relatively self-sufficient. After World War II, the neighborhood fell into decline, but it was revitalized through a neighborhood association effort starting in 1969 and remains an icon of Italian-American culture in St. Louis.

Starting in the 1890s, an extensive streetcar system and railroad stations enabled commuters to travel from suburban towns bordering St. Louis City into the inner city core. Towns such as Kirkwood, Maplewood, Webster Groves, Richmond Heights, University City, and Clayton grew rapidly between 1900 and 1930. Restrictions on immigration and extensive movement to these towns doubled the population of St. Louis County from 1910 to 1920, while St. Louis City only grew 12 percent in the same period. During the 1930s, St. Louis City's population declined by a small amount for the first time, but St. Louis County grew by nearly 30 percent. Nearly 80 percent of new construction in the region occurred outside city limits during the late 1930s, and St. Louis planners were unable to combat the problem via annexation.

The rise in automobile ownership after World War II also allowed for suburbanization far beyond the city limits. The city reached its peak population at the 1950 census, reflecting a national housing shortage after World War II. Continued suburban development and highway construction would lead to a steep decline in the city's population over the next several decades. Between the 1950 census and the year 2000, the city lost more than half its population to St. Louis County and St. Charles County. Some people left the region altogether; national trends were for job and population migration away from Rust Belt cities in the Midwest and Northeast to the developing Sunbelt cities in the south and west.

== The Civil Rights Struggle ==
St. Louis has been a part of the modern black freedom movement since the early 1920s.

Due to Missouri' status as a border state, with a much smaller African American population than the south, African Americans retained their right to vote after reconstruction. Segregation was also less total than in the deep south, with public transportation being unsegregated, but most public places, such as ballparks and lunch counters, being segregated. The work force was also deeply segregated, with African Americans often finding employment as menial laborers and in factories, usually for low wages. Activists in St. Louis leveraged both mass protest and political activism to achieve goals of equal employment, housing, integration, and wages.

There are multiple well-known protests and civil rights event in St. Louis. These include the Funsten Nutpicker Strike of 1933, where African American women working as pecan shellers for the R.E Funsten Company went on strike for eight days to demand higher and equal wages, and union recognition.

Another important event was the Fairground Park Riot in 1949, when the integration of Fairgrounds Pool in north St. Louis on June 21st led to violence. As African American teenagers and children attempted to visit the pool, groups of white teenagers and adults attacked them, and rioting continued into the evening.

The Congress of Racial Equality (CORE) organized sit ins at various restaurants during the 1950s and 1960s to protest Jim Crow segregation. Founded in 1947, the St. Louis chapter of CORE began sit-ins at the Stix, Baer and Fuller Department store lunch counter in July 1948, and continued until December 1951. They staged additional sit-ins against Woolworths in December 1949 and Kresges dime store in 1950. By the end of their campaign in 1953, almost all of the downtown lunch counters had agreed to integrate. In 1961, mayor Raymond Tucker passed the Public Accommodations Ordinance, ending segregation in public accommodations.

Another large event is the Jefferson Bank Boycott that occurred from August 1963 to March 1963. CORE had demanded that five banks hire 31 African American tellers and clerks. The focused most of their picketing efforts on the Jefferson Bank and Trust Company, where protesters picketed every day. On October 11th, protests escalated, with protesters laying on the ground to be arrested, and blocking police vehicles. On March 31th, 1964, Jefferson Bank hired six African American tellers.

Black Power also had a significant presence in St. Louis starting in the late 1960s. In 1964, Percy Green founded the Action Council to Improve Opportunities for Negroes (ACTION), which focused its efforts mainly on police brutality and employment opportunities. Percy Green also gained notoriety for climbing the north leg of the Gateway Arch with white activist Richard Daley to protest unequal hiring practices of contractors.

The Black Liberators were another important black power group. Founded in 1968 by Charles Koen, they modeled themselves after the Oakland Black Panthers, with a similar uniform and free breakfast programs.

== The Arch and Busch Stadium projects ==
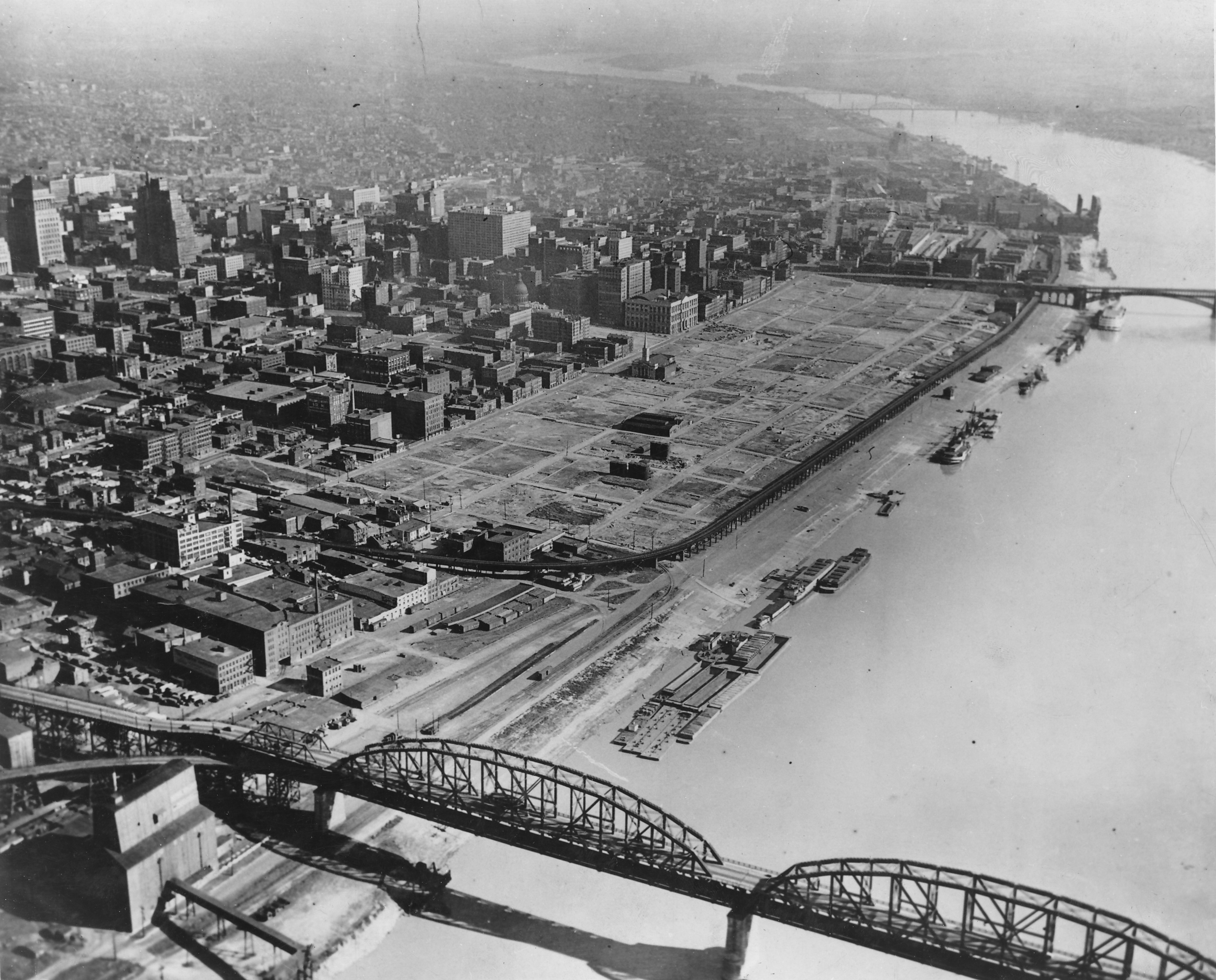
The St. Louis riverfront in 1942 after land clearance for Gateway Arch National Park

Early urban renewal efforts in St. Louis coincided with efforts to plan a riverfront memorial to honor Thomas Jefferson, which would later include the famous Gateway Arch. Starting in the early 1910s, St. Louis businessman Luther Ely Smith had pushed for a riverfront rehabilitation project to promote green spaces and better living conditions near the wharf. In December 1933, St. Louis Mayor Bernard Dickmann formed a group to promote Smith's project on a national level as both a renewal project and a memorial. The lobbying proved successful, as in 1934, Congress formed a commission to plan the project, which first met in December 1934 in St. Louis. The study group heard a preliminary proposal from Louis LaBeaume of the St. Louis chapter of the American Institute of Architects, in which a memorial would be constructed on land cleared south of the Eads Bridge by half a mile, extending from the riverfront to Third Street, which would encompass the entire area of the original village of St. Louis.

The commission approved LaBeaume's land clearance and memorial design plan, and in 1935, the city issued a $7.5 million bond to purchase and demolish buildings at the site. The clearance project was aided by $9 million from the Works Progress Administration, and work began quickly on acquisition and demolition of the forty block area. The only remnant of Laclede's street grid to be preserved was north of the Eads Bridge (in what is now known as Laclede's Landing), while the only building in the area to remain was the Old Cathedral, built in 1834. Demolition continued until the outbreak of World War II, when the area began to be used as a parking lot, and the project remained stalled until the late 1940s.

Luther Ely Smith again led the charge for the riverfront project in 1945, leading a group that organized a design competition for the memorial. In 1948, Eero Saarinen's design, the Gateway Arch, won the competition, but construction would not begin until 1954, with a $5 million appropriation from Congress. During the 1950s and 1960s, nearly $20 million more was appropriated by the federal government to complete the project, in addition to money from the Terminal Railroad Association, Bi-State Development Agency, and a 1967 bond issue by the city of St. Louis. The Arch was topped out in October 1965, and a museum and visitors' center opened underneath the structure in 1976. In addition to attracting millions of visitors, the Arch also ultimately spurred more than $500 million in downtown construction during the 1970s and 1980s.

Starting in the 1920s, the St. Louis Cardinals became more popular than the older St. Louis Browns, although the Cardinals rented a shared space at Sportsman's Park with the Browns. The Cardinals, with second baseman Rogers Hornsby and pitchers Jesse Haines and Grover Cleveland Alexander, defeated the New York Yankees in the 1926 World Series by four games to three, giving the club and city its first World Series victory. The Cardinals won several more National League pennant races and the World Series multiple times during the 1930s and 1940s. As the Cardinals gained in popularity with their victories, the Browns lost their fans with defeats, winning the American League pennant only once, in 1944, followed by a defeat in the 1944 World Series at the hands of the crosstown Cardinals. In 1953, the Browns' owner, Bill Veeck, was forced to sell Sportsman's Park to the Cardinals and the team itself to a group of Baltimore investors led by Clarence Miles, and the Browns were relocated and renamed the Baltimore Orioles.

By the mid-1950s, Sportsman's Park had deteriorated to the point of needing expensive repairs, and a new park was proposed closer to downtown St. Louis. The exterior of the new park was designed by Edward Durell Stone to echo the Gateway Arch, and the Cardinals moved into Busch Memorial Stadium for the 1965 season. However, construction of the stadium required the demolition of Chinatown, St. Louis, ending decades of presence in the area by a Chinese immigrant community. Although the stadium's playing field was particularly hot in summer, the stadium was considerably larger than its predecessor and was an asset to downtown development.

== Urban renewal and housing projects ==
Concurrent with plans to build Gateway Arch National Park during the 1930s were plans to provide low-rent or subsidized housing to the poor in the city. The majority of the city's infant mortality and tuberculosis cases originated in a set of small neighborhoods, and to rectify these problems, the city built two housing projects between 1939 and 1942. The first, Carr Square Village, was built on the near north side of the city, while the second, Clinton-Peabody Terrace, was built near City Hospital, with a combined cost of $7 million for slightly more than 1,300 units. Despite these two projects and the efforts at civic improvement starting in the 1920s, after World War II more than 33,000 houses in St. Louis had shared or outdoor toilets, while thousands lived in cramped, squalid conditions.

Under the guidance of St. Louis Mayor Joseph Darst, in 1953, the St. Louis Land Clearance Reutilization Authority (LCRA) purchased and cleared the former Chestnut Valley area, then sold the land to developers who constructed middle-class apartment buildings in what was called the Plaza Square project. The same year Darst promoted a $1.5 million bond issue that allowed for the completion of the St. Louis Gateway Mall project by clearing blocks of land from 15th to 18th streets. Darst also was responsible for encouraging the construction of several large high-rise housing projects, all of which began between 1951 and 1953.

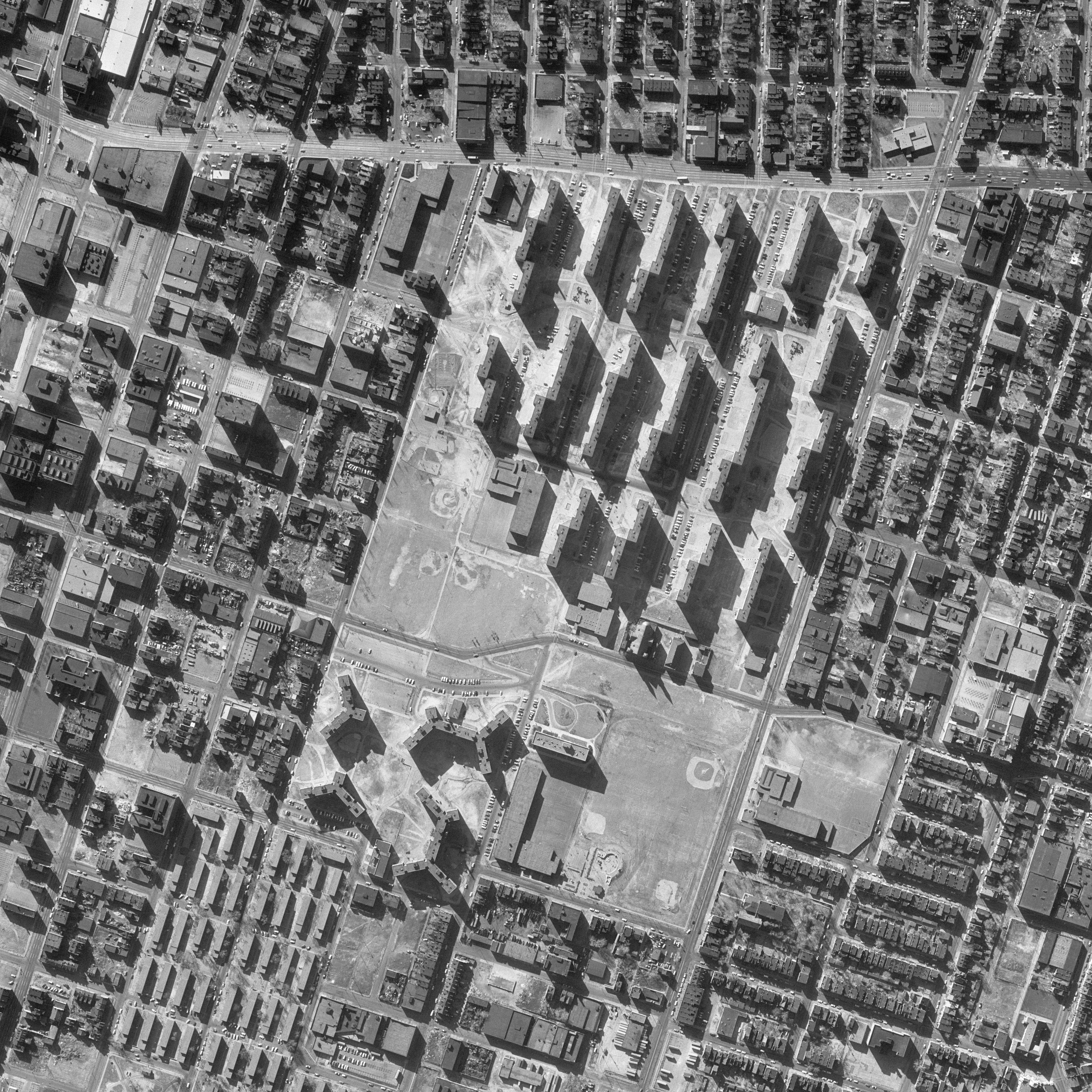
The Pruitt-Igoe housing project (shown from above) consisted of 33 buildings and nearly 3,000 units but lasted less than 20 years

The first of the five, Cochran Gardens, began in 1951 and opened in 1953 as 2 six-story, 2 seven-story, and 4 twelve-story buildings with more than 700 units, located in the near north downtown. Another project, Darst-Webbe, opened in 1956 in the near south downtown, and included more than 1,200 units in eight high-rise buildings. The most famous and largest of the St. Louis projects was Pruitt-Igoe, which opened in 1954 and 1955 on the northwest edge of downtown and included 33 eleven-story buildings with nearly 3,000 units. The St. Louis Pruitt-Igoe complex was the first major work of Minoru Yamasaki, who later designed the World Trade Center and other Mid-Century Modern designs.East of Pruitt-Igoe was the Vaughn Apartments complex, which included 4 nine-story buildings and had more than 650 units. Between 1953 and 1957, St. Louis had gained more than 6,100 units of public housing, and each opened with enthusiasm on the part of local leaders, the media, and new tenants.

However, the projects were plagued with problems from the beginning; upon its opening, gangs attacked and harassed residents at Darst, while it became quickly apparent that there was too little recreational space, too few healthcare facilities or shopping centers, and employment opportunities were scarce. Crime was rampant, particularly at Pruitt-Igoe, and even after a $5 million renovation in 1965, only 17 of 33 Pruitt-Igoe towers had occupants in 1971. Plumbing was vandalized and sold by thieves as scrap, causing human waste to accumulate in the buildings' corridors. Two of the 33 Pruitt-Igoe buildings were demolished to make room for playgrounds in 1972, but vacancies and problems continued unabated until the demolition of the other 31 towers in 1975. The other St. Louis housing projects remained relatively well-occupied through the 1980s, in spite of languishing problems with crime.

Along with the development of the major housing projects was a 1955 urban renewal bond issue totaling more than $110 million, which included funds to purchase land to build three expressways into downtown St. Louis. The Daniel Boone Expressway (signed as U.S. Route 40 and later as Interstate 64) was an eight-mile stretch from the city's western edge near Clayton to the area currently occupied by Busch Stadium. the Mark Twain Expressway (signed as an alternate Route 40, later Interstate 70) was another eight mile highway from northwest St. Louis to the Eads Bridge. The third highway was the Ozark Expressway (signed as U.S. Route 66 and later Interstate 44), which extended from the southwestern city limits to 11th and Geyer streets, later forming a junction with Interstate 55. A highway bridge over the Mississippi was planned in conjunction with the three expressways, and in 1967, the Poplar Street Bridge opened to move traffic from all three expressways over the river.

The 1955 bond issue also provided funds for clearing more than 450 acres of a residential neighborhood known as Mill Creek Valley, starting in February 1959. Nearly 2,000 families and more than 600 individuals were displaced in the project, which provided land for the Daniel Boone Expressway, new industrial sites, and an extension of Saint Louis University. The majority of the displaced were poor blacks, and in what the NAACP called a "Negro Removal Project", they were moved to housing projects and historically stable, well-to-do black neighborhoods such as The Ville. Middle-class blacks who once lived in the area near Sumner High School and Homer G. Phillips Hospital moved west to north St. Louis County cities, exacerbating social problems in north St. Louis. Although some subsidized housing was built in Mill Creek Valley to some success during the 1960s, by the late 1970s the area had fallen below the expectations of its developers.

== Government consolidation attempts ==
Largely due to the population exodus from St. Louis City, dating to the 1920s and accelerating through the 1950s, St. Louis government leaders made several attempts at consolidating government or services in the region. Among the earliest of these was an attempt in 1926, fostered by a state constitutional amendment, which allowed a Board of Freeholders to create a plan in which the city would annex all of St. Louis County. While the plan passed among city voters by a margin of seven to one, it failed in the county by three to one, and a 1930 constitutional amendment allowing consolidation of only some services also failed, largely due to its overwhelming rejection by county voters. Only after World War II would more efforts be made toward consolidation of services.

The first (and one of the few) successful attempts at consolidation resulted in the creation of the Metropolitan Sewer District, a city-county water and sewer company formed in 1954. The next year, however, a city-county transit agency was rejected by voters, leading St. Louis Alderman Alfonso J. Cervantes to propose a meeting of a Board of Freeholders to discuss city-county consolidation.

To that end, Mayor Raymond Tucker obtained grants to fund a study of consolidation, which found that most county and city residents would not support full consolidation but would support partial consolidation of certain agencies, such as mass transit, zoning, and property assessment. The Board of Freeholders that met to discuss consolidation selected the study's recommendations to present to the voters, opting out of a full city-county merger. Although most major business groups, unions, and Cervantes supported the proposal, Mayor Tucker refused to endorse it, claiming it was inadequate. Anti-tax arguments against the creation of a new government district also were effective, and both city and county voters rejected it overwhelmingly.

As the population of St. Louis County grew, local subdivisions began multiplying and incorporating into tiny cities and towns, producing more than 90 separate municipalities by the 1960s. Those in favor of regional planning found some success, however, in the 1965 creation of the East-West Gateway Coordinating Council, a regional council given the power to advance applications for federal aid from cities in the region. Among the more controversial proposals to come from the East-West Council was the proposal to build a second regional airport, located somewhere on the Illinois side of the region. In spite of initial approval for the plan in the 1976, Secretary of the Interior Brock Adams canceled the airport project in 1977 under political pressure from Missourians, who feared a loss of business at Lambert International Airport.
