= St. Louis University High School =

All boys Jesuit secondary school in St. Louis, Missouri, United States

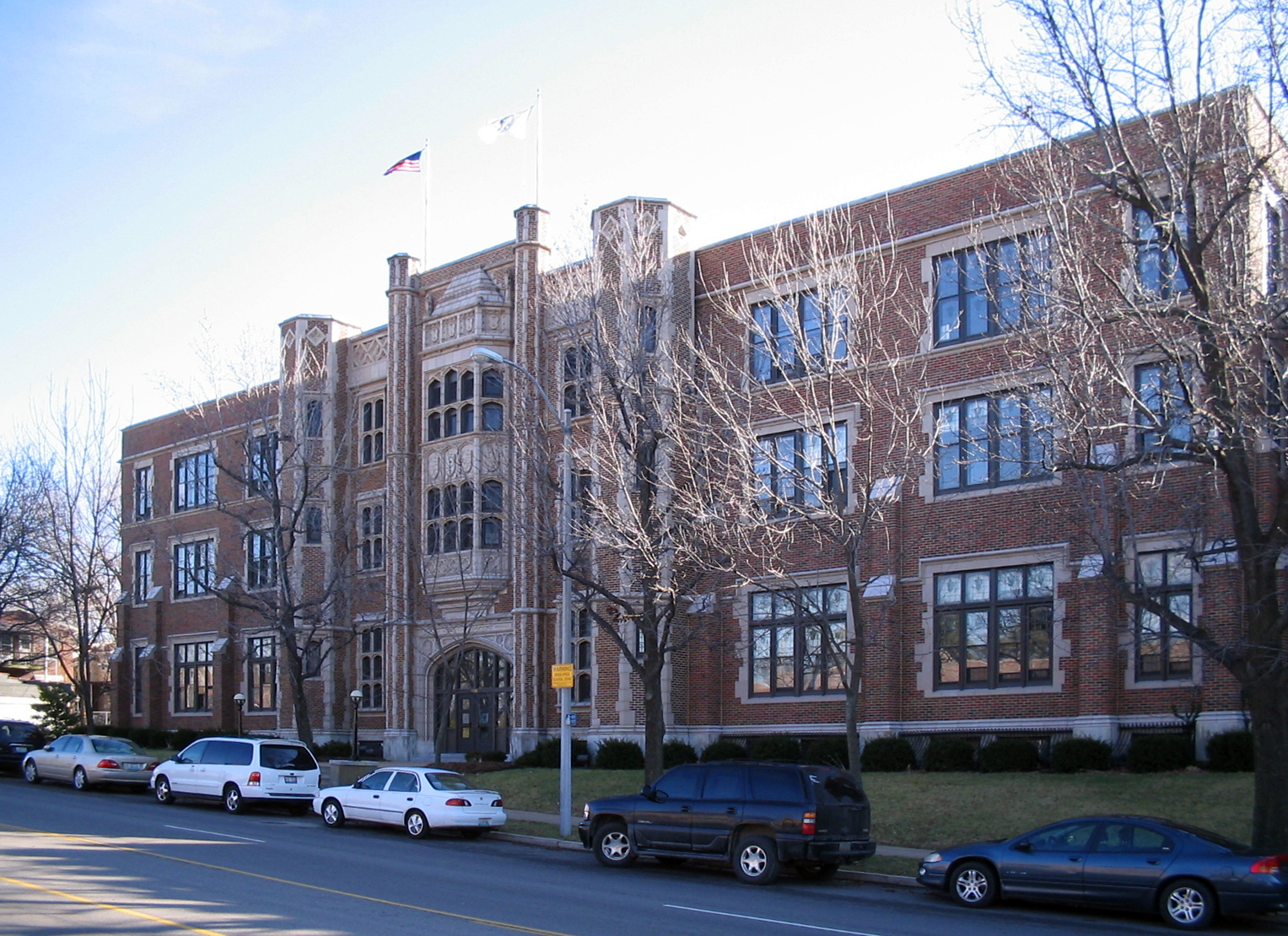

Location
- 4970 Oakland Avenue; St. Louis, Missouri 63110; United States; 38.6281°N 90.2669°W

Information
- Type: Private college-preparatory school
- Religious affiliation: Roman Catholic (Jesuit)
- Established: 1818; 208 years ago
- Founder: Louis Guillaume Valentin Dubourg (as St. Louis Academy)
- President: Matthew Stewart, SJ
- Principal: Megan Menne
- Teaching staff: 100
- Grades: 9–12
- Gender: Male
- Enrollment: 1024 (2023–24)
- Average class size: 19.5
- Student to teacher ratio: 11:1
- Athletics conference: Metro Catholic Conference
- Mascot: Jr. Billiken
- Rivals: Christian Brothers College High School, De Smet Jesuit High School
- Accreditation: ISSL, ISACS, NAIS, Cognia Blue Ribbon
- Publication: “The Prep News”, Sisyphus, "Gadfly", SLUH Magazine, President's Gratitude Report
- Newspaper: The Prep News
- Yearbook: The Dauphin
- Tuition: $19,750 (2022–23)
- Website: sluh.org

St. Louis University High School (SLUH) is a private, all-male Jesuit college-preparatory school in St. Louis, Missouri, United States. Founded in 1818, it is the oldest secondary educational institution in the United States west of the Mississippi River. The school is part of the Archdiocese of St. Louis.

== History ==
SLUH was founded in 1818 by Louis William Valentine DuBourg, then bishop of St. Louis, as a Latin school for boys known as St. Louis Academy. The school later became associated with Saint Louis University, which received university status in 1832. The high school remained on the university's campus until 1924, when it moved to a separate campus and was incorporated as St. Louis University High School. The school's campus, on Oakland Avenue, was donated by Anna Backer in memory of her husband and alumnus George Backer. That facility, also known as Backer Memorial, has since expanded.

The school integrated in 1946, a year before Cardinal Joseph Ritter issued a pastoral letter desegregating Catholic schools in the St. Louis Archdiocese.

== Governance ==
Since the school is part of the Jesuit network that consists of 61 high schools and 28 colleges and universities in the United States, SLUH provides an education infused with the tradition and philosophy of St. Ignatius of Loyola. Theology and philosophy classes are conducted daily.

== Curriculum ==
SLUH follows a college-preparatory curriculum and courses. The school offers humanities courses in the language department and has offered four-year programs in Russian and Chinese since 1964. In 1997, a student exchange program with the Nanjing Foreign Language School was established. Since 2011, SLUH has sponsored a Confucius Classroom which is a subdivision of Webster University's Confucius Institute. In 1999, educational exchange programs for the study of Russian language and culture were established with schools in St. Petersburg. In keeping with its strong Jesuit Catholic heritage, courses in Latin and Greek are offered, as are the popular choices of French, Spanish, Arabic, and Chinese. SLUH also has strong programs in the natural sciences, mathematics, computer science, social sciences, fine arts, and literature.

Advanced Placement (AP) courses have been offered through SLUH for half a century. AP courses are now offered for 22 disciplines. In 2010, 345 students took 790 AP exams. Eighty-seven percent scored a 3, 4, or 5, grades that qualify them for college credit.

== School structure ==
According to figures released on SLUH's website in 2011, the median ACT score for SLUH students is over 30. By composite score, it ranks among the top 7% of schools in the United States. Over 50% of SLUH's class of 2011 achieved a score of 30 or higher on the ACT. Among St. Louis and St. Louis area high schools with a total enrollment of over 600, it had the highest scores in 2012. Since 2005 a total of 31 students have received a 36, the highest score possible. Four members of the class of 2012 achieved this score, along with five members of the class of 2013, and two members of the class of 2014. More recently, seven students from the class of 2024 achieved this score.

== Campus ==
The SLUH campus has undergone several major expansions since the 1980s, when then-principal Thomas Cummings began the "E-3" campaign. The school added the Robinson Library and developed property along Oakland Avenue during the 1980s. A performing arts wing with a 610-seat theater was added during the 1990s.

A major capital campaign known as Vision 2000 began in the late 1990s. The $32 million project included improvements to academic facilities, technology, class sizes, and student services.

The school's athletic facilities were expanded during the 2000s. A football stadium received artificial turf in 2004 adjacent St. Louis Science Center. Followed by the construction of a soccer and track complex and a baseball field. The Danis Field House was completed in 2009, a free-standing field house that contains two gymnasium spaces, a wrestling room, offices and meeting space for the athletic staff, and locker facilities.

Since 2008, the school's track has hosted the Festival of Miles, an annual track event.

The school later completed the Go Forth campaign, which funded additional campus projects, including the Dill Center, which houses the administration and school counselors in the old cafeteria, and the three-million-dollar Chapel of the Beloved Disciple Renovation completed in 2024. The renovation of the Chapel of the Beloved Disciple and the Heithaus Media Center with new facilities for student publications, photography, podcasting studios, and video production.

In 2024, an alumni donated $10 million to establish a center for integrated STEM education. In 2025, financier another donated $16 million to establish the Sciuto Institute for Teaching Excellence.

== Extracurricular activities ==
SLUH students participate in academic activities including mathematics competitions, the Math League, speech and debate, Mock Trial, and Quizbowl.

=== Athletics ===
SLUH's athletic teams, known as the Jr. Billikens or Jr. Bills, compete in the Metro Catholic Conference. In Missouri State High School Activities Association (MSHSAA) competition, SLUH competes in the largest classification. The school's state championships include:

- Water polo: 22
- Basketball: 4 (1946, 1952, 1958, 1961)
- Soccer: 5 (1972, 1990, 2003, 2024, 2025)
- Tennis: 3 (1970, 1981, 2006)
- Ice hockey: 4 (2013, 2018, 2019, 2022)
- Swimming and diving: 4 (1956, 2003, 2018, 2024)
- Cross country: 5 (1961, 1999, 2009, 2012, 2013)
- Golf: 3 (1952, 2025, 2026)
- Track and field: 1 (2006)
- Football: 1 (1970)
- Lacrosse: 2 (2009, 2012)
- Volleyball: 5 (2003, 2007, 2008, 2015, 2016)

At the national level, the racquetball program has won 16 championships, and the rifle team has won six. The school also fields teams in inline hockey, rugby union, and ultimate frisbee

== Awards and recognition ==
In each year from 2013 to 2016, SLUH was named among the top-scoring organizations in the mid-size employer category of the St. Louis Post-Dispatch's survey of Top Workplaces.\

In 2010, 23 students from SLUH were named National Merit Scholarship Program Semifinalists, more than any other school in Missouri. In 2011, 17 students were named Semifinalists, while 28 were named National Merit Commended Scholars. In 2012, 25 students were named Semifinalists, while 29 were named Commended Scholars.

SLUH has also performed well in the Presidential Scholars Program. In 2007, for example, three of Missouri's ten semifinalists were from SLUH. In 2012, one of Missouri's ten semifinalists was from SLUH.

In The Washington Post's 2015 ranking of America's Most Challenging High Schools, SLUH was ranked among the top three in Missouri and the top 1.5% nationwide. In the Post's 2016 ranking, SLUH was ranked among the top 1.2% nationwide. The United States Department of Education's National Blue Ribbon Schools Program recognized SLUH as an Exemplary High Performing National Blue Ribbon School for 2015. In 2016, Niche ranked SLUH as the 19th-best All-Boys high school in the US.

== Notable alumni ==
SLUH alumni include figures in government, entertainment, journalism, academia, religion, humanitarian work, and professional sports.

=== Business ===
- Timothy J. Danis, businessman, founder of RCP Advisors
- John T. Schuessler, former CEO and chairman of the board of Wendy's International, Inc.

=== Clergy ===
- William S. Bowdern, Jesuit priest, conducted an exorcism, some details of which were portrayed in William Peter Blatty's novel The Exorcist, as well as in the movie based upon that novel. In the movie Possessed, Timothy Dalton played the role of Fr. Bowdern
- Edward Dowling, Jesuit priest and spiritual advisor to Bill W.
- David Francis Hickey, bishop of the Roman Catholic Diocese of Belize City-Belmopan
- Michael J. Sheridan, bishop of the Roman Catholic Diocese of Colorado Springs

=== Entertainment ===
- James Gunn, screenwriter, director studio executive for DC Extended Universe
- Sean Gunn, actor
- Jim Byrnes, actor and musician
- Dave Giuntoli, actor
- George Hickenlooper, filmmaker
- Ken Kwapis, film and television director
- Dan Potthast, ska musician, and member of MU330, named after the class in which its constituents met

=== Government and public service ===
- John E. Bardgett, former justice of the Supreme Court of Missouri
- Terrence L. Bracy, former Assistant United States Secretary of Transportation
- Alfonso J. Cervantes, former mayor of St. Louis
- Joseph Darst, former mayor of St. Louis
- Edward Louis Filippine, federal judge
- Raymond Gruender, judge of the United States Court of Appeals for the Eighth Circuit
- Daniel Isom, former chief of the Metropolitan Police Department, City of St. Louis
- Tim Jones (politician), former Speaker of the Missouri House of Representatives
- Chris Koster, Missouri Attorney General
- F. William McCalpin, attorney
- Bryan Mullanphy, former mayor of St. Louis
- Stephen Murphy III, judge of the United States District Court for the Eastern District of Michigan
- Bob Onder, U.S. representative
- Mel Price, former U.S. representative from Illinois
- William F. Quinn, former governor of Hawaii
- Eugene R. Sullivan, former chief judge of the United States Court of Appeals for the Armed Forces
- Raymond Tucker, former mayor of St. Louis
- Buzz Westfall, former St. Louis County Executive

=== Historical ===
- Jean Baptiste Charbonneau, son of Sacagawea and Toussaint Charbonneau, members of The Corps of Discovery/Lewis and Clark Expedition, pictured as an infant on the U.S. One Dollar Coin.

=== Humanitarianism/activism ===
- Thomas Anthony Dooley III, humanitarian, medical doctor, activist, author and Congressional Gold Medal recipient
- Henry Hampton, Civil Rights Movement activist, recipient of the Heinz Award, filmmaker (Eyes on the Prize)
- Stephen Hanlon, American public defender reformer and civil rights attorney
- E. Michael Harrington, Harvard professor, author, and founder of the Democratic Socialists of America.
- Max Starkloff, disability rights activist and founder of Paraquad

=== Journalism ===
- Greg Burke, journalist and former director of the Holy See Press Office
- Robert Hyland, radio executive
- George Michael, sportscaster

=== Military ===
- Michael Blassie, former unknown soldier for Vietnam War
- Alonzo Patrick Fox, U.S. Army lieutenant general

=== Science and academia ===
- Joseph L. Badaracco, business ethics scholar and Harvard Business School professor
- Gary Gutting, philosopher and professor at the University of Notre Dame
- Hubert Schlafly, co-inventor of the teleprompter
- Keith Schwab, physicist and professor at California Institute of Technology

=== Sports ===
- Tony Adams, former NFL player
- Nelson Burton Jr., professional bowler
- Buzz Demling, former professional soccer player
- Joe Germanese, former Major League Soccer player
- Cole Grossman, former Major League Soccer player
- Henry Jones, former NFL player
- Bob Kehoe, soccer player and former coach of the United States men's national soccer team
- Ty Keough, former professional soccer player and broadcaster
- Ed Macauley, basketball player and Basketball Hall of Fame member
- Pat McBride, soccer player and National Soccer Hall of Fame member
- Tommy Meyer, professional soccer player
- Ken Sanders, professional baseball player
- Joe Schultz, professional baseball player and manager
- Hank Raymonds, basketball coach
- Frank Simek, former member of the United States men's national soccer team
- Matt Sinclair, former NFL player
- Luis Soffner, professional soccer player
- Murphy Troy, Olympic volleyball medalist
- Taylor Twellman, former Major League Soccer player and member of the United States men's national soccer team
- Ronnie Wingo, former NFL and Canadian Football League player
- Ryan Wingo, college football player

== Notable staff ==
- Charles "Dismas" Clark, teacher and prison-reform advocate who founded Dismas House. The Hoodlum Priest, a film about Clark, was made in 1961. Don Murray played the role of "Dismas" Clark.
- Erwin Claggett, former Saint Louis University basketball player and head coach of the SLUH basketball team.
- Pierre-Jean De Smet, Jesuit missionary and early teacher at the school
- Walter Halloran, Jesuit priest and former teacher
- Robert J. Henle, Jesuit educator and former president of Georgetown University (1969–1976)
- Mike Jones, NFL football player and SLUH head football coach until 2022
- John Knoepfle, poet, translator, and university professor who taught English at SLUH
- Hank Raymonds '42, coached basketball at SLUH from 1950–55

== Former headteachers ==
In 1984, Paul Owens became the school's first lay principal. In 2002, Mary Schenkenberg became its first female principal. In 2005, David J. Laughlin was hired as the school's first lay president.

== See also ==
- Saint Louis University
