= 1973 St. Louis mayoral election =

- April 3, 1973
- Turnout: 21.63%
Candidate	John Poelker	Joseph Badaracco
Party	Democratic	Republican
Popular vote	76,601	57,962
Percentage	56.93%	43.07%
Mayor before election
Alfonso Cervantes
Democratic
Elected mayor
John Poelker
Democratic

The 1973 St. Louis mayoral election was held on April 3, 1973 to elect the mayor of St. Louis, Missouri. It saw the election of John Poelker and the defeat of incumbent mayor Alfonso Cervantes in the Democratic primary.

The election was preceded by party primaries on March 6.

== Democratic primary ==
Democratic primary results
Party	Candidate	Votes	%
Democratic	John Poelker	48,941	46.33
Democratic	Alfonso Cervantes (incumbent)	43,340	41.02
Democratic	James F. Conway	13,367	12.65
Turnout		105,648	16.98

== General election ==
General election result
Party	Candidate	Votes	%
Democratic	John Poelker	76,601	56.93
Republican	Joseph Badaracco	57,962	43.07
Turnout		134,563	21.63
