= 1977 St. Louis mayoral election =

- April 5, 1977
- Turnout: 16.68%

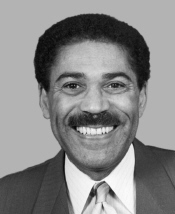
Candidate	James F. Conway	James Stemmler	Bill Clay
Party	Democratic	Republican	Independent
Popular vote	69,567	16,910	16,877
Percentage	67.01%	16.29%	16.26%
Mayor before election
John Poelker
Democratic
Elected mayor
James F. Conway
Democratic

The 1977 St. Louis mayoral election was held on April 5, 1977 to elect the mayor of St. Louis, Missouri. It saw the election of James F. Conway. Incumbent mayor John Poelker decided not to seek a second term.

The election was preceded by party primaries on March 8.

== Democratic primary ==
Democratic primary results
Party	Candidate	Votes	%
Democratic	James F. Conway	64,302	60.49
Democratic	Alfonso J. Cervantes	41,225	38.78
Democratic	Dudley Higginson	779	0.73
Turnout		106,306	17.08

== General election ==
General election result
Party	Candidate	Votes	%
Democratic	James F. Conway	69,567	67.01
Republican	James Stemmler	16,910	16.29
Independent	Bill Clay	16,877	16.26
Socialist Workers	Helen Savio	456	0.44
Turnout		103,810	16.68
