= Walter Wood (producer) =

American film producer

- Born: August 4, 1921; Philadelphia, Pennsylvania, U.S.
- Died: April 20, 2010 (aged 88); Palm Springs, California, U.S.
- Occupation: Film producer
- Years active: 1962–1983

Walter Wood (August 4, 1921 – April 20, 2010) was an American film producer and businessman.

== Career ==
Wood served as an aide to Dwight D. Eisenhower in the U.S. Army and received a Purple Heart for his service during World War II and the Korean War. After the military he worked as a publicist for RKO and an advertising executive in New York.

His first credit as a film producer was for The Hoodlum Priest, a 1961 film directed by Irvin Kershner, based on the life of Father Charles "Dismas" Clark. The Hoodlum Priest was the first venture for Murray-Wood Productions, a company Wood established with the film’s star, Don Murray. Wood’s wife, Cindi Wood, co-starred in the film. It screened in competition at the Cannes Film Festival.

Wood reunited with Don Murray for Escape from East Berlin, a 1962 film directed by Robert Siodmak. The film is based on a news story of twenty-eight people who tunneled to freedom under the Berlin Wall earlier that same year.

He served as executive producer on the 1971 film, The Todd Killings. The film, directed by Barry Shear, is based on murders committed by Charles Schmid in Tucson in the 1960s.

In 1974, the Mayor of New York, Abraham Beame set up the Mayor Advisory Council on Motion Pictures and Television and Wood was appointed its first director. Wood’s job was to help attract investment in New York’s film industry, which had been lagging, and to negotiate around demand for facilities in the city, particularly in relation to filming in exterior locations. Film and television production in New York increased significantly during his time as director.

In 1978 Wood acquired the rights to the stock-car racing novel Stand On It by William Neely and Robert K. Ottum. The film was released in 1983 as Stroker Ace and was produced by Wood’s second wife, Laurel Goodwin. It was the final collaboration between director Hal Needham and star Burt Reynolds and was a critical and financial flop.

== Filmography ==
- ’’The Todd Killings’’ (1971) (executive producer)
- ’’Escape From East Berlin’’ (1962) (producer)
- ’’The Hoodlum Priest’’ (1961) (producer)
