= Victor J. Miller =

American politician (1888–1955)

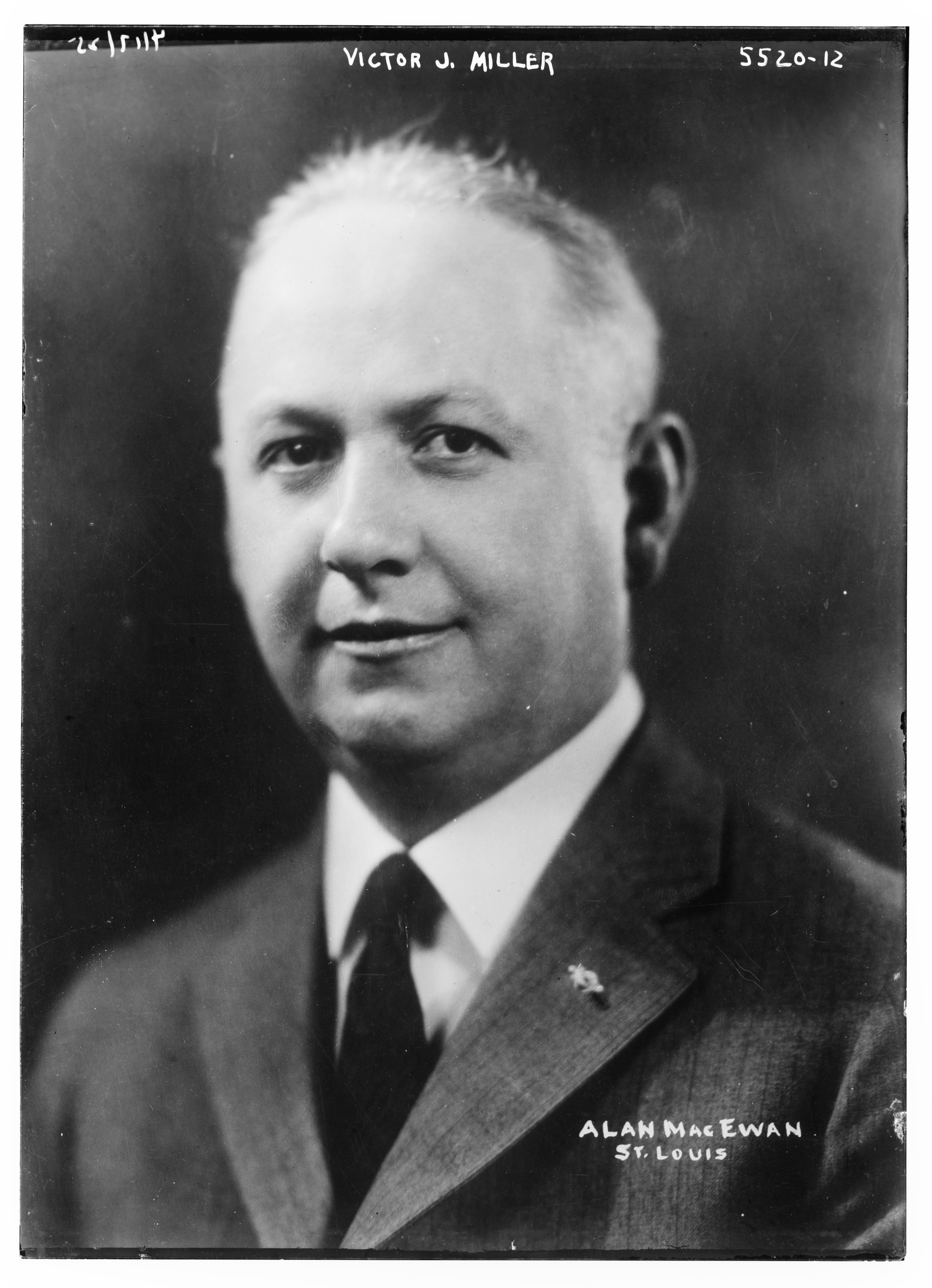
- Miller c. 1920–1925

33rd Mayor of St. Louis
- In office April 21, 1925 – April 18, 1933
- Preceded by: Henry Kiel
- Succeeded by: Bernard F. Dickmann

Personal details
- Born: December 6, 1888 Joplin, Missouri, U.S.
- Died: January 6, 1955 (aged 66) Kansas City, Missouri, U.S.
- Resting place: Mount Hope Cemetery, Joplin, Missouri, U.S.
- Party: Republican
- Education: University of Missouri; Washington University in St. Louis
- Profession: Politician, lawyer

Victor J. Miller (December 6, 1888 in Joplin, Missouri – January 6, 1955 in Kansas City, Missouri) was the 33rd Mayor of St. Louis, serving from 1925 to 1933.

Miller grew up in Joplin and attended the University of Missouri. He graduated from Washington University School of Law, and began practicing law in St. Louis. In 1921, Governor Arthur M. Hyde appointed Miller President of the St. Louis Police Board. When he took office, the force included only six African-American officers—Negro specials—who were not allowed to wear uniforms. In his first year in office, hired fifteen African Americans and, like other officers, required them to wear uniforms. He served in that position until 1923. In 1924, Miller was a Republican candidate for Governor of Missouri. He was defeated by Sam Aaron Baker, but carried St. Louis in the race.

After his strong performance in St. Louis during the 1924 Governor's election, Miller ran for Mayor of the City in 1925, and was elected at the age of 36. He was re-elected in 1929. Several major public works projects approved by voters in a 1923 bond issue were completed during Miller's administration, including the construction of the Civil Courts Building. One of these public works projects, an $8,000,000 street lighting initiative led to charges of graft and corruption in city government. An investigation by the St. Louis Post-Dispatch found that the lighting contractor, A.M Ryckoff of Chicago, had overcharged the city by more than $150,000. Ryckoff and two city employees were indicted, but Ryckoff died before the matter came to trial, and charges were dropped against the city employees.

At the conclusion of his term as Mayor, Miller left St. Louis. He went to New York, then later to Kentucky, finally settling in Kansas City. He died in Kansas City on January 6, 1955 and was buried at Mount Hope Cemetery in Joplin, Missouri.

| Preceded by Henry Kiel | Mayor of St. Louis; 1925 – 1933 | Succeeded by Bernard F. Dickmann |
