= John T. Schuessler =

American businessman

John T. Schuessler is an American businessman, the former chairman, CEO, and president of the fast food chain Wendy's International, Inc. He started with the company in 1976 and retired in 2006.

== Employment history ==
- Wendy's International
  - 1973 worked at McDonalds
  - 1976: hired as manager trainee in Atlanta, Georgia
  - 1983-1984: regional VP, company operations
  - 1984-1986: zone VP
  - 1986-1987: division VP
  - 1987: promoted to executive VP, Northwest Region
  - 1995: promoted to executive VP, U.S. operations
  - 2000: named CEO and president, March 16, 2000
  - 2001: named chairman of the board, May 1, 2000
  - 2006: retired

== Education ==
- Prep school at St. Louis University High.
- BS from Spring Hill College, Mobile, Alabama
