= Timothy J. Danis =

American businessman

- Born: Timothy Jerome Danis; February 14, 1947 (age 79); St. Louis, Missouri, U.S.
- Education: Loyola University
- Children: 4

Timothy J. Danis is an American businessman. He currently is chairman and chief executive officer at Risk Consulting Partners. He founded the company in 2001.

Danis graduated from St. Louis University High School in 1965. In 1969, Danis received a B.S. in mathematics from St. Louis University. In 1971, he received an MBA from Loyola University.

Danis was the Assistant to Pat Ryan, the chairman and CEO of Aon. Danis also was Vice Chairman of the Board at Aon Risk Services Companies.

On January 25, 2012, a group of 28 investors, led by Danis and Jim Forbes, purchased Horseshoe Bay Golf Club in Egg Harbor, Wisconsin for about $3 million. The private 18-hole championship golf course, which is considered by many golfers to be one of the finest in Door County, was designed by American Society of Golf Course Architect Richard G. Robbins. It opened for business in 2000.

In 2014, Danis opened an insurance agency.

He is a board member of American Industrial Partners, Cancer Treatment Centers of America, Ashion-Pmed and has served on many other corporate and civic boards including being the past Chairman of the Loyola University School of Business. Danis has also served on the boards of the United Way of St. Louis, Boys and Girls Clubs of America, Tyco Toys, Shedd Aquarium, Ghirardelli Chocolate Company, Chicagoland Chamber of Commerce, Maryville University, and Commerce Banks.

Danis and his wife Jackie are noted for their work with various philanthropic organizations and causes. In 2018, they were involved with the Greatest Gateway Gala. The event raised 4.1 million dollars for cancer research. In 2021, he and his wife sponsored the theatrical play Romance in D, performed by the Peninsula Players. “…an unlikely romantic success (that) spells hope for us all” – Chicago Tribune.
