= Club Riviera =

Nightclub in St. Louis, Missouri, US

Club Riviera was a nightclub at 4460 Delmar Blvd in St. Louis, Missouri. It was one of the most popular African-American nightclubs in the United States in the 1940s and 1950s. It was owned by politician and civil rights activist Jordan W. Chambers from 1944 to 1962. In 1964, the venue became the Riviera Civic Center under new ownership. The building was vacant when it was destroyed by fire in 1970.

== History ==
The New Riviera Club was opened by Alex Bayou on December 3, 1943. The opening featured performances by the Smoothies, radio stars Kate Smith, Burns and Allen, Fred Waring, dancer Dorothy Dale, comedian Jack Herbert, and Gus Martel's orchestra.

In 1944, African-American politician and civil rights activist Jordan W. Chambers purchased the Riviera nightclub located at 4460 Delmar Blvd. Chambers acquired the property through a white buyer who had an option on it.

The grand reopening featured performances by the vocal group Cats and the Fiddle, singers Marcella Wilson, Connie Lynwood, dancer Hortense Allen and her Riviera Chorines, and the Jeter-Pillars Orchestra on June 23, 1944.

After a three-week closure for redecoration, Club Riviera reopened on December 21, 1945. Performers at the reopening included Ernie Fields and his orchestra, the Phil Moore Four jazz group, comedians Allen Drew and Grace Smith, and dancer Al Guster and the Riviera Chorines.

During its heyday, Club Riviera is said to have rivaled the Cotton Club in Harlem, New York. Renowned jazz entertainers such as Nat King Cole, Ella Fitzgerald, and Duke Ellington performed at the club.

Chambers also rented the nightclub out to social clubs and organizations for events.

In February 1952, a reception was held at Club Riviera in honor of entertainer Josephine Baker who was presented the key to the city.

In the early 1960s business began to decline and after Cambers died in 1962, his estate sold the building. In 1964, the building was remodeled and reopened as the Riviera Civic Center.

A fire destroyed the vacant building on December 7, 1970. Authorities suspect it was an act of arson because the windows and doors of the vacant building were boarded up after a fire the previous month.

The venue subject of a play, Live at the Club Riviera, at The Grandel in St. Louis.

== Notable performers ==
Notable performers who performed at Club Riviera include:

- Valaida Snow
- King Cole Trio
- Sister Rosetta Tharpe
- Luis Russell
- Billy Eckstine
- Miles Davis
- Ernie Fields
- Ella Fitzgerald
- Erskine Hawkins
- Jay McShann
- Billie Holiday
- Ruth Brown
- Cab Calloway
- Count Basie
- Johnny Hodges
- Louis Jordan
- Dinah Washington
- Little Richard
- Dizzie Gillespie
- Ike Turner
- Little Willie John
- Duke Ellington
- Ray Charles
- B.B. King
- Jackie Wilson
- Etta James
- Bobby "Blue" Bland
- Little Junior Parker
- Ike & Tina Turner
- Sam Cooke
