= William D. Becker =

American mayor of St. Louis (1876–1943)

43rd Mayor of St. Louis, Missouri
- In office April 15, 1941 – August 1, 1943
- Preceded by: Bernard F. Dickmann
- Succeeded by: Aloys P. Kaufmann

Personal details
- Born: October 23, 1876 East St. Louis, Illinois, U.S.
- Died: August 1, 1943 (aged 66) St. Louis, Missouri, U.S.
- Cause of death: Aviation accident
- Party: Republican
- Profession: Lawyer

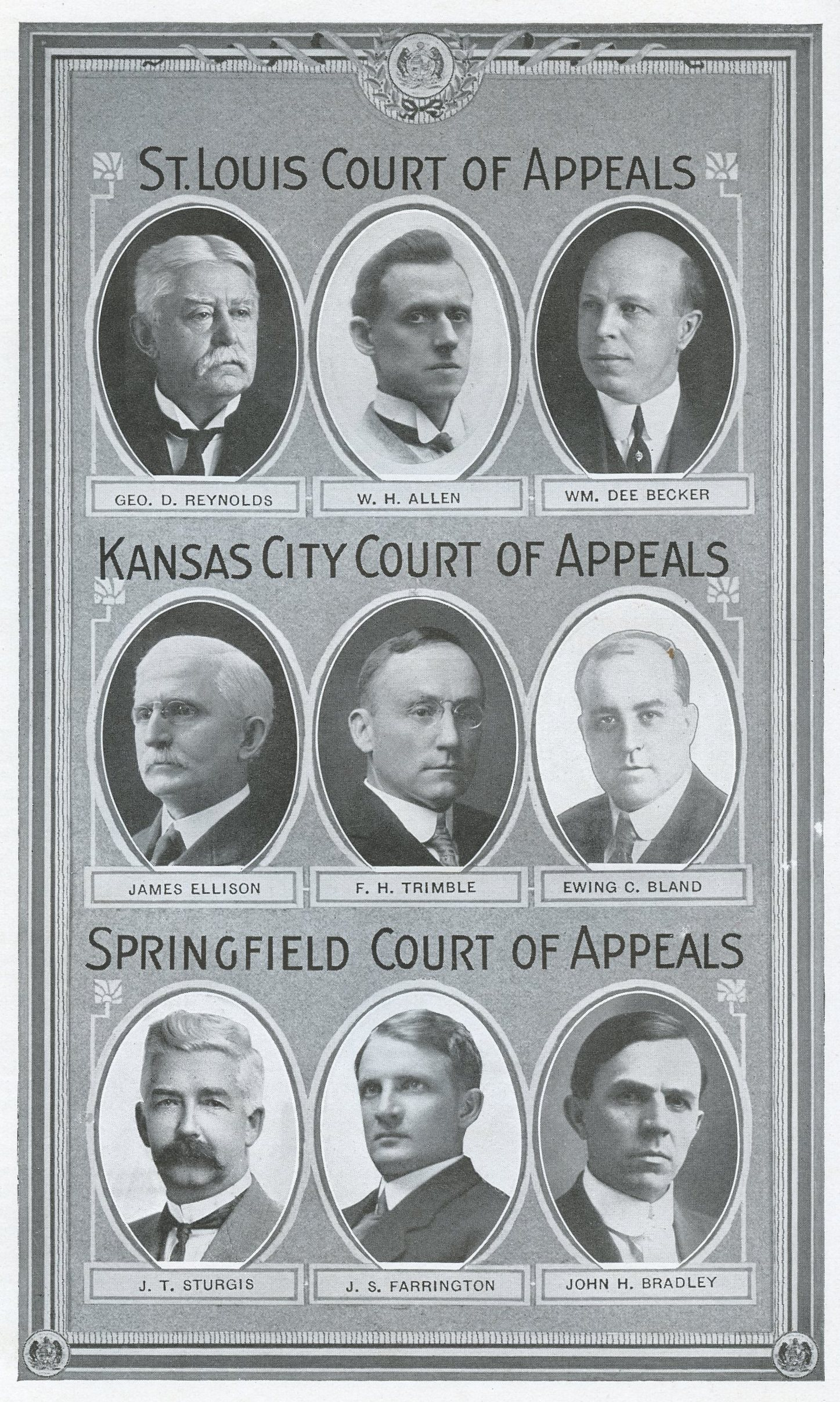
William D. Becker, top right

William Dee Becker (October 23, 1876 – August 1, 1943) was an American lawyer and politician. He served as the 35th mayor of St. Louis from 1941 until his death in an aviation accident in 1943.

== Biography ==
The son of German immigrants, Becker graduated from Harvard University and St. Louis Law School. After 15 years of private law practice, he was elected to a twelve-year term on the St. Louis Court of Appeals in 1916. He was re-elected for second twelve-year term in 1928.

=== Mayor of St. Louis ===
In 1941, Becker was the Republican Party nominee for mayor of St. Louis. He defeated incumbent mayor Bernard F. Dickmann, a Democrat, who was seeking election to a third term in the April 1941 election. Perhaps the most significant development during Becker's term as mayor was the adoption of a civil service amendment to the city charter. The amendment enacted a merit system for the hiring of city employees. Prior to that time, a political patronage system prevailed in which all city employees could be replaced with a change of partisan administration. Becker supported the civil service reform and it was approved by the voters in September 1941. Becker also retained Raymond Tucker, who had been appointed Smoke Commissioner by Mayor Dickmann, and supported his efforts to reduce air pollution within the city.

=== Death ===
On the Sunday afternoon of August 1, 1943, St. Louis aircraft manufacturer William B. Robertson was hosting the first public demonstration of a new Waco CG-4 glider, built under sub-contract by his company, Robertson Aircraft Corporation. As a crowd of spectators watched at the Lambert St. Louis Airport, Mayor Becker, Robertson, and other St. Louis luminaries boarded the glider that was towed by a Douglas C-47 transport plane for a flight over the city. Immediately after the release of the towing cable, the right wing of the glider broke off, and it plummeted from an altitude of 1,500 feet (460 m), killing all 10 persons on board. Becker was buried at Bellefontaine Cemetery. Aloys P. Kaufmann, president of the city's Board of Aldermen, succeeded Becker as mayor of St. Louis.

== Sources ==
- "Becker Pledge Aid to Donnell in Inaugural". Jefferson City Pot-Tribune. April 15, 1941. p. 1.
- "Mayor of St. Louis, Other Officials Die in Glider's Plunge" (PDF). The New York Times. August 2, 1943. pp. 1, 10 – via TimesMachine.
- "William Dee Becker". St. Louis Mayors. St. Louis Public Library. Archived from the original on 14 May 2011.
- "William Dee Becker Death Certificate" (PDF). Missouri Secretary of State.

Preceded by Bernard F. Dickmann	Mayor of St. Louis; 1941 – 1943	Succeeded by Aloys P. Kaufmann
