= Robert Hyland =

Robert Hyland, Jr. (1920–1992) was CBS regional vice president and general manager of radio station KMOX in St. Louis, Missouri for four decades.

== Personal life ==
He was born in St. Louis, Missouri in 1920. He attended both St. Louis University High School and Saint Louis University. Before going into radio he embraced the idea of becoming a professional baseball player and even an actor, but these ideas were shot down by his father or other reasons. Hyland was the son of the longtime Cardinals team physician, Robert F. Hyland.

== Contributions/Career ==
Hyland emphasized and leveraged KMOX's relationship with the St. Louis Cardinals; he also made the decision in 1960 to eliminate the station's afternoon music programming in favor of talk radio, a critical change which led to the station's subsequent dominance of the St. Louis radio market. He also introduced the first listener call-in programs at KMOX in 1960.

Hyland was very much involved in civic ventures. He founded the drug and alcohol treatment center at St. Anthony's Hospital (St. Anthony's Medical Center), which was named after his father. He served on the boards of the St. Louis Zoo, the St. Louis Symphony, and the Municipal Opera, and received many honorary degrees and awards. In 1988 he was chosen as the St. Louis Man of the Year. [Final Resting Place, p. 145]

Hyland was the man who brought the Big Red Line Cheerleaders to the St Louis Football Cardinals Organization.

== Death ==
Hyland died in 1992 due to cancer.
