= Escape from East Berlin =

1962 film by Robert Siodmak

- Directed by: Robert Siodmak
- Screenplay by: Gabrielle Upton; Peter Berneis; Millard Lampell
- Story by: Gabrielle Upton; Peter Berneis
- Produced by: Walter Wood
- Starring: Don Murray; Christine Kaufmann; Werner Klemperer
- Cinematography: Georg Krause
- Edited by: Maurice Wright
- Music by: Hans-Martin Majewski
- Production companies: Walter Wood Productions; Hans Albin Filmproduktion
- Distributed by: Metro-Goldwyn-Mayer
- Release dates: October 22, 1962 (West Berlin); November 1962 (U.S.)
- Running time: 89 minutes
- Countries: United States; West Germany
- Language: English

Escape from East Berlin (German: Tunnel 28) is a 1962 thriller film directed by Robert Siodmak and starring Don Murray, Christine Kaufmann and Werner Klemperer. Based on true events, the film follows a group of East German defectors who attempt to cross the Berlin Wall via tunneling. An international co-production between the United States and West Germany, the film was shot on-location in West Berlin and at Tempelhof Studios.

== Plot ==
In East Berlin, Kurt Schröder is a chauffeur to Army Major Eckhardt and his wife Heidi, with whom he is having an affair. One night he sees a friend, Günther Jurgens, who works at the garage where Kurt has the Major's car maintained, drive his tow-truck through a gate and get killed trying to escape to the west. Günther's sister, Erika, comes looking for Günther when he doesn't return, and is told that Kurt saw him last night. She then goes to Kurt's house, where he lives with his mother, Uncle Albrecht (a musician), sister Ingeborg and kid brother Helmut within sight of the wall. Erika is intent on escaping to West Berlin, thinking that her brother made it. Kurt, reasonably satisfied with his life, has no intention of risking his life to attempt an escape. Erika then attempts to escape over the wall but Kurt catches her as she tries to crawl under the barbed wire, and they pretend to be lovers to hide her intentions from suspicious guards. Kurt then hides her in his house. A piece of Erika's clothing is caught in the barbed wire, and the guards track her to the Schröder's house. She hides in a room without a floor, and narrowly escapes the guards after they conclude that she could not be in the room.

The Schröders and their neighbors, including a woman named Marga who has a baby and whose husband has already escaped to the west, want to escape East Germany. Kurt comes up with the idea of building a tunnel under the wall, through which they can escape to West Berlin. Although he will mastermind the plan, Kurt has no intention of going with them. They drill through the basement wall using Uncle Albrecht's band as a noise cover when the actual drilling takes place. One member of the family keeps watch while the others work on the tunnel itself. After they start digging the tunnel, they are joined by Walter Brunner, who had his own plan to dig a tunnel. All the while, Kurt is falling in love with Erika, and he eventually summons the courage to tell her that her brother is dead. Because of this burgeoning love, Kurt has changed his mind and will escape with the rest of his family and Erika. On January 27, 1962, the tunnel is completed when just before dawn Kurt reaches the other side, and the breakout is planned for the following night.

However, Marga tells Erika's parents the news of their daughter, and Erika's father, a professor who favors the Communist regime, betrays the escape plan to Major Eckhardt. Kurt is waiting to drive the Eckhardt's and learns from Heidi that the authorities are after him and he takes the car and hurries home ahead of the East German troops. When he arrives home, Kurt learns that his family have invited Uncle Albrecht's band members to join the escape, bringing the number of escapees to 28. Kurt tells them of the betrayal, and that they must make their escape immediately. As the police besiege their house, the Schröders, their friends and Erika make their escape, with Kurt bringing up the rear. He is wounded when a soldier fires at him as he goes through the tunnel collapsing it behind him. Erika comes back to find and help him. Together they make their way to the exit, where the others have already emerged to live in freedom.

== Cast ==
- Don Murray as Kurt Schröder
- Christine Kaufmann as Erika Jurgens
- Werner Klemperer as Walter Brunner
- Ingrid van Bergen as Ingeborg Schröder
- Carl Schell as Major Eckhart
- Edith Schultze-Westrum as Mother Schröder
- Bruno Fritz as Uncle Albrecht
- Maria Tober as Marga
- Horst Janson as Günther Jurgens
- Kai Fischer as Heidi Eckhart
- Kurt Waitzmann as Prof. Thomas Jurgens
- Helma Seitz as Frau Jurgens
- Ronald Dehne as Helmut Schröder
- Christiane Maybach as Frau Eckhart
- Alfred Balthoff as Klussendorf

== Production ==
=== Development and casting ===
Since the building of the Berlin Wall in 1961 stories of escapes from the East, both failed and successful, had filled the news in the West and led to competition between US networks to record a tunnel escape. MGM decided to take advantage of the public interest with a feature film inspired by real events. The film was based on the defection of one Erwin Becker, a chauffeur in the car pool of the East German Parliament, who led 28 other escapees via tunnel into West Berlin in early 1962. Becker served as a technical adviser to the production.

In addition to playing a co-starring role, German-American actor Werner Klemperer was also the film's casting director and an (uncredited) associate producer, acting as a liaison between the American and German elements thanks to his bilingualism.

Before Don Murray was cast, Horst Buchholz was offered the role of Kurt Schröder. However he declined, having just played an East German character in Billy Wilder's One, Two, Three (1961) and feeling the part was too similar.

=== Filming ===
After pre-production in Munich, shooting began on May 28, 1962 in West Berlin. Studios interiors were shot at Tempelhof Studios. A 300-yard long plaster replica of the Berlin Wall (originally constructed for One, Two, Three) was brought from UFA Studios to just four blocks from the actual Wall for filming. The wall briefly became a tourist attraction and attracted the attention of East German guards. The film crew filmed sentries flashing spotlights across the border, turning them into film extras and prompting director Robert Siodmak to rave “Talk about realism!" Shooting also took place at the actual Brandenburg Gate border crossing.

== Release ==
The film held its world premiere in Haus der Kulturen der Welt on October 22, 1962. The following month, it premiered in the United States.

== Reception ==
According to MGM records, the film made a profit of $193,000.

A negative review in Der Spiegel reads "Although three Hollywood writers and the German-American director Robert Siodmak, a native Berliner, show considerable sympathy for the walled-in Germans, the film proves to be unartistic and not without its embarrassing moments. The fast-forwarded silent newsreel footage from August 13, 1961, is far more powerful than the subsequent bland dramatization. The dialogues between the lead actors, Don Murray and Christine Kaufmann, could have been taken from speeches by federal ministers."
