= Joseph Darst =

American politician (1889–1953)

Joseph M. Darst (March 18, 1889, in St. Louis, Missouri – June 8, 1953, in St. Louis) was the 37th mayor of St. Louis, serving from 1949 to 1953.

== Biography ==
Darst attended St. Louis University High School, Christian Brothers College, and Saint Louis University. His business career was in real estate, but he was always interested in politics and worked on several campaigns. In 1933, he worked on behalf of Bernard F. Dickmann in his successful race for Mayor. Mayor Dickmann appointed Darst as Director of Public Welfare. During his eight years in this position, Darst oversaw the construction of three public hospitals in St. Louis. Darst returned to his real estate practice in 1941. He made an unsuccessful bid for President of the St. Louis Board of Aldermen in 1943, losing to Aloys P. Kaufmann. Darst served as director of the Federal Housing Administration (FHA) during 1947-1948.

Darst was elected mayor of St. Louis in April 1949. Darst was a proponent of urban renewal through slum clearance and the construction of large scale affordable public housing. This approach to urban renewal has been criticized by later generations of urban planners and theorists such as Jane Jacobs. During Darst's time as Mayor, approximately 700 public housing units were completed. When he left office, an additional 17,000 units were under construction and 4,000 were in the planning stages. Although he was initially opposed to a City earnings tax, Mayor Darst came to believe it was necessary for the City's finances to remain stable. He successfully lobbied the Missouri Legislature to pass legislation enabling the earnings tax.

Mayor Darst was in poor health during the last year of his time as Mayor. He died just two months after his term of office expired at age 64, and was buried in Calvary Cemetery.

Political offices
Preceded by Aloys P. Kaufmann	Mayor of St. Louis; 1949–1953	Succeeded by Raymond Tucker
