= Aloys P. Kaufmann =

American mayor of St. Louis (1902–1984)

36th Mayor of St. Louis
- In office August 1, 1943 – April 19, 1949
- Preceded by: William D. Becker
- Succeeded by: Joseph Darst

Personal details
- Born: December 23, 1902 St. Louis, Missouri, U.S.
- Died: February 12, 1984 (aged 81) St. Louis, Missouri, U.S.
- Party: Republican
- Education: Benton College of Law
- Profession: Politician, lawyer

Aloys P. Kaufmann (December 23, 1902 – February 12, 1984 in St. Louis) was the 36th Mayor of St. Louis, serving from 1943 to 1949. He is, to date, the last Republican mayor of the city.

Kaufmann graduated from the Benton College of Law and practiced law in St. Louis. He was active in Republican Party politics in St. Louis, and served as a member of the City party's central committee from 1936 to 1943. In 1943, he was elected President of the St. Louis Board of Aldermen, defeating Democrat Joseph Darst in the April election.

In 1943, Mayor William D. Becker was killed in a glider crash at Lambert Airport in St. Louis. Under the provisions of the city charter, Kaufmann, as President of the Board of Aldermen, became mayor for the remainder of Becker's term. Kaufmann was elected to his own term of office in 1945, the last time a Republican has been elected mayor of the city.

During his time as mayor, Kaufmann worked to pass a $69 million bond issue, which was approved by the voters in April 1944. One of the items funded by the bond issue was an expansion of Lambert Airport from 350 acres (1.4 km^{2}) to 1,400 acres (5.7 km^{2}). Other accomplishments during Mayor Kaufmann's term included improvements in sanitation and public health, with the establishment of a rat control system in 1946 and the establishment of a refuse division in 1947. Kaufmann was unsuccessful in his efforts to get the Missouri Constitutional Convention to expand the boundaries of St. Louis City, which had been fixed in 1876. The first attempt to institute an earnings tax in St. Louis was approved during Mayor Kaufmann's term, but was overturned by the Missouri Supreme Court because the State Legislature had not authorized such a tax.

Mayor Kaufmann left office in 1949. He returned to his law practice and remained active in civic affairs. In 1954, he became President of the Chamber of Commerce of Metropolitan Birmingham. Kaufmann died February 12, 1984, at age 81.

== Sources ==
- Much of the original content for this article was based on the brief biographies of St. Louis Mayors found at the St. Louis Public Library's website linked above.

Political offices
Preceded by William D. Becker	Mayor of St. Louis; August 1, 1943 – April 19, 1949	Succeeded by Joseph Darst
