= Jordan Chambers =

American politician

Jordan W. Chambers (1896–1962) was a prominent politician in St. Louis, Missouri. He is credited with organizing precinct captains in the well-known Ward 19 to ensure that all in his ward got out to vote. He is also credited with organizing the Young Democratic Club. A park and post office in St. Louis is named after Chambers in honor of his civil service. He often was known as the "negro mayor of St. Louis."

== History ==
Chambers was the owner of the Peoples Undertaking Company in St. Louis, next to the St. Louis political headquarters. In 1963 he was elected Constable and Democratic Committeeman of the 19th Ward, making him the first Black Committeeman in St. Louis history. He was instrumental in get the Black vote for Harry S. Truman for president. Chambers worked to improve the lives for Blacks & was influential in getting integration of the Circuit Court & the St. Louis Housing Authority. He owned Club Riviera, a prominent meeting place for many entertainment stars and politicians. He continued to work for civil rights until he died, and Governor John Dalton gave his eulogy at Chamber's funeral. President Kennedy and Vice-president Johnson also relayed condolence.
