= Bernard F. Dickmann =

American mayor of St. Louis (1888–1971)

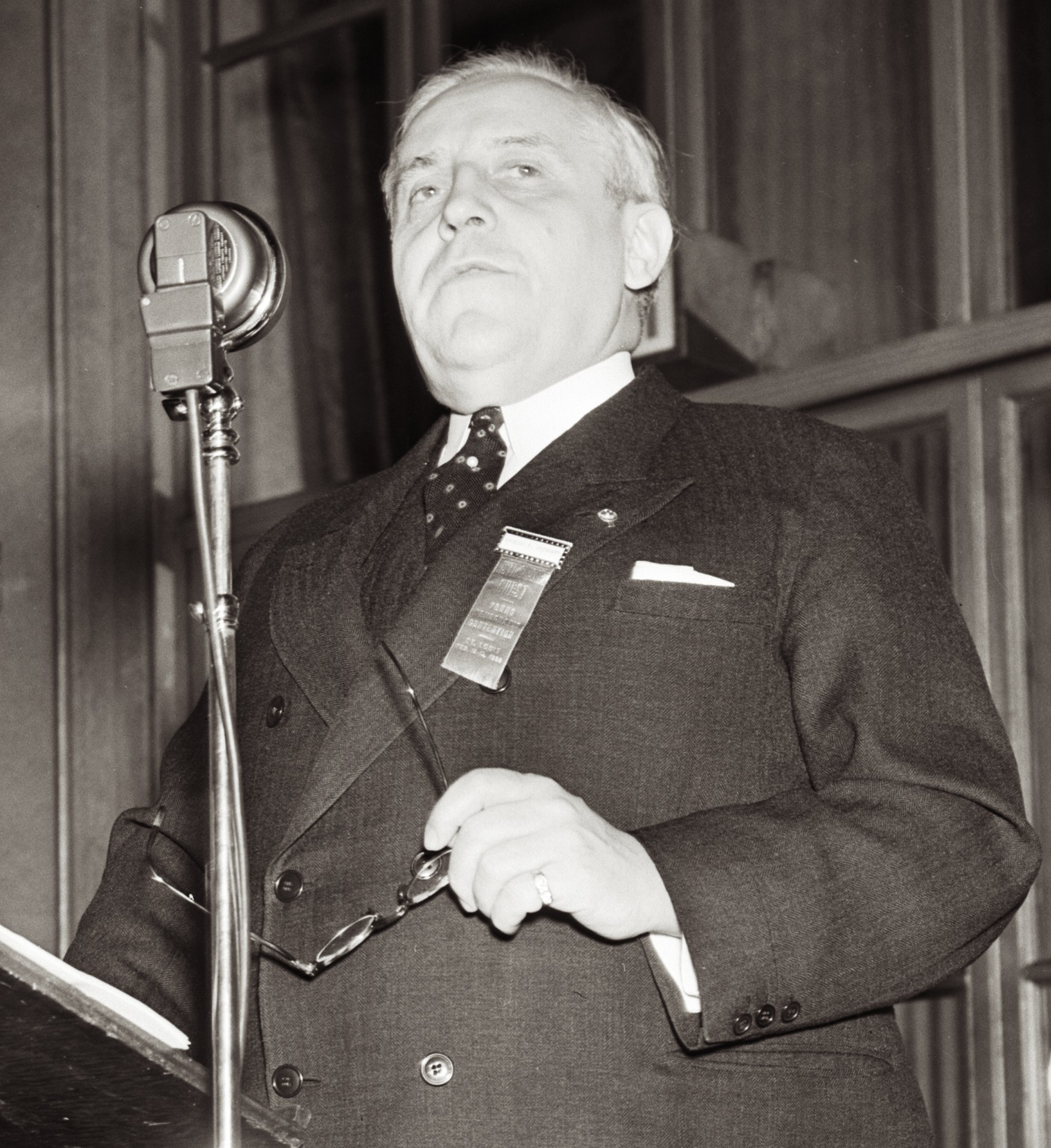
- Mayor Bernard Dickmann, 1939

34th Mayor of St. Louis
- In office April 18, 1933 – April 15, 1941
- Preceded by: Victor J. Miller
- Succeeded by: William D. Becker

Personal details
- Born: Bernard Francis Dickmann; September 7, 1888 St. Louis, Missouri, U.S.
- Died: December 9, 1971 (aged 83) Collins, Mississippi, U.S.
- Resting place: Saints Peter and Paul Cemetery, St. Louis, Missouri, U.S.
- Party: Democratic

Bernard Francis Dickmann (September 7, 1888 in – December 9, 1971) was the 34th mayor of St. Louis from 1933 to 1941.

== Biography ==
Dickmann started work at the age of 16, working for a lumber company in St. Louis. During World War I he enlisted in the Marine Corps.

His later business career was in real estate. He was active in the St. Louis Real Estate Exchange, serving on the board of directors, and serving as its president in 1931.

In April 1933, Dickmann was elected Mayor of St. Louis. The United States was suffering from the effects of the Great Depression, and Franklin Delano Roosevelt had just been elected president. Dickmann's election marked the first time in 24 years that a Democrat had been elected Mayor of St. Louis. It also marked the first time a Democrat was elected with the support of a formidable African American political organization: The Co-operative Civic Association led by Jordan Chambers. Dickmann kept black support by building a long-promised modern hospital for the black community, which Republican Mayor Henry Kiel had promised would be paid for by the $87 million 1923 bond issue. By fulfilling his promise, Dickmann helped transform St. Louis from majority Republican to majority Democrat.

During Mayor Dickmann's administration, the city acquired and cleared the land along the riverfront that would become the Gateway Arch National Park (known as the Jefferson National Expansion Memorial until 2018) and be developed with the Gateway Arch. During Mayor Dickmann's administration, the city also enacted a smoke ordinance and took steps to reduce the air pollution created by the extensive use of coal for home heating and industrial use in the city.

In 1941, Dickmann sought a third term as mayor. He was defeated by Republican William D. Becker. Dickmann was a delegate to the Missouri Constitutional Convention in 1943. In December 1943, he was appointed St. Louis Postmaster, a position he held until 1958. In 1949, while serving as Postmaster of St. Louis, Dickmann married Beulah Pat Herrington, the Postmistress of Mount Olive, Mississippi. In 1959, Mayor Raymond Tucker appointed Dickmann as director of the city's newly established Department of Welfare, and he served in that position for two years. After completing his government service, Dickmann continued in the real estate business. He died in Collins, Mississippi on December 9, 1971, at the age of 83. The Poplar Street Bridge crossing the Mississippi River at St. Louis was formerly named in his honor.

Dickmann is interred in Saints Peter and Paul Cemetery in south St. Louis.

Preceded by Victor J. Miller	Mayor of St. Louis; 1933–1941	Succeeded by William D. Becker
