= James F. Conway =

American businessman and politician (1932–2025)

41st Mayor of St. Louis
- In office April 15, 1977 – April 17, 1981
- Preceded by: John Poelker
- Succeeded by: Vincent C. Schoemehl

Personal details
- Born: June 27, 1932 St. Louis, Missouri, U.S.
- Died: November 25, 2025 (aged 93) Creve Coeur, Missouri, U.S.
- Party: Democratic
- Spouse: Joan C. Newman
- Children: 5
- Education: Saint Louis University (BS, MBA)
- Profession: Lawyer; politician

James F. Conway (June 27, 1932 – November 25, 2025) was an American businessman and politician in St. Louis, Missouri. He served as the 41st mayor of the city from 1977 to 1981.

== Early life and education ==
Conway was born on June 27, 1932 in St. Louis, Missouri, where he attended parochial schools. He attended Saint Louis University and received a B.S. in geophysical engineering, and an MBA in Business Administration.

== Career ==
Conway worked as a sales engineer and production manager for the Nooter Corporation. Later he served as president of A.C.I Plastics Company.

He had joined the Democratic Party and in 1966 he was elected as a state representative. He was re-elected and served more than one term. In 1974, he ran for and was elected to the Missouri State Senate.

Conway was determined to bring his expertise back to the city. In the March 1977 Democratic primary for mayor, Conway defeated former mayor A.J. Cervantes. He won the April general election by a large margin.

Like many mayors of St. Louis, Conway found it difficult to accomplish some of his goals within the city's system of divided government. He and comptroller Raymond Percich differed on interpretations of the City Charter, and their battles became quite heated, with numerous lawsuits and threats of lawsuits.

Mayor Conway succeeded in getting voters to lift the $25,000 salary limit that had been contained in the city charter. Some saw the salary cap as a hindrance in recruiting and retaining highly qualified civil servants. The duplication of services at the two public hospitals in St. Louis (City Hospital and Homer G. Phillips Hospital) concerned Mayor Conway. His decision in 1979 to consolidate most hospital services at City Hospital was extremely unpopular with residents in North St. Louis, where Homer G. Phillips Hospital was located.

In 1981, Conway was defeated in his bid for re-election in the Democratic primary by Vincent C. Schoemehl. After leaving office, Conway returned to his business, ACI Plastics, and remained active in civic affairs. In the late 1990s and early 2000s, he and former mayors Vincent C. Schoemehl, Jr. and Freeman Bosley Jr. worked with a group called Citizens for Home Rule, which worked on various proposals to amend the city's charter.

== Personal life and death ==
Conway was married to Joan C. Newman, and together they had five children. Their son, Steven, also became a politician; he was elected to the St. Louis Board of Aldermen in 1991. After repeatedly winning re-election for several terms, in 2017 he was appointed by Mayor Lyda Krewson as City Assessor.

Conway died from prostate cancer at a hospital in Creve Coeur, Missouri, on November 25, 2025, at the age of 93.

== Sources ==
Much of the original content for this article was based on the brief biographies of St. Louis Mayors found at the St. Louis Public Library's website, https://web.archive.org/web/20041013215847/http://exhibits.slpl.lib.mo.us/mayors/mayors4.asp

- "New St. Louis Mayor". Mount Vernon Register-News. April 20, 1977. p. 1.
- "Election Set". Jefferson City Post-Tribune. April 20, 1977. p. 2.
- "New Mayor in St. Louis". Burlington Hawk-Eye. April 22, 1981. p. 2.

Preceded by John Poelker	Mayor of St. Louis; 1977–1981	Succeeded by Vincent C. Schoemehl
