= Dismas Clark =

American priest

Charles Dismas Clark (1901–1963) was an American Jesuit priest based in St. Louis. In 1959, he created the first halfway house to support men coming out of prison: Dismas House. Clark knew that if a man coming out of prison could be given a decent place to live and a job, he rarely returned to prison. However, if a man did not receive such support he had a very high chance of committing another crime and returning to prison. For his work with ex-convicts, Clark earned the moniker "The Hoodlum Priest." In 1960, actor Don Murray came to St. Louis to film the movie The Hoodlum Priest on Father Clark's effort to create Dismas House.

== Life ==
Father Clark was born Charles Clark in 1901 in Pennsylvania. His family moved to Illinois. In 1919 he entered the Jesuits (the Society of Jesus) at St. Stanislaus Seminary in Florissant and was ordained a Catholic priest in 1932. He taught at Saint Louis University High School from 1934 to 1936. During World War II, Father Clark served as an Army chaplain at Camp Bowie, Texas. Being Clark, he connected most to the soldiers who got in trouble.

Clark then became a retreat leader and did parish mission work around the country. Clark was a popular speaker who packed them in with his frankness and honesty. He connected easily with the sinners, but not so much with "the good people."

One day Clark found himself outside of City Jail in St. Louis. Curious, he went inside. There he found a prisoner in a cell laying in his own vomit who had been beaten into a false confession. Charles Clark found his mission. He made more visits to City Jail and discovered more mistreatment of prisoners and injustices in the court system. In particular, he became aware of the lack of support for prisoners leaving prison. He began working full time with men in prison.

Often called "Charlie," Father Clark changed his first name to Dismas to connect with ex-convicts. According to Christian tradition, St. Dismas was the name of the Good Thief on the cross to whom Jesus promised: "Today you will be with me in paradise." As is mentioned in the movie The Hoodlum Priest, the Good Thief is the only one in the gospels to get such a promise.

== Dismas House ==
With the help of prominent St. Louis criminal defense lawyer and underworld crime figure Morris Shenker, Clark created Dismas House. In the next decades half-way houses were set up across the country. Dismas House was originally on Cole Street in downtown St. Louis. It still exists today on North Kingshighway and Cote Brillante in North St. Louis in the building that was once the residence of the Brothers of Mary who taught at McBride High School.

== The Hoodlum Priest ==
The 1961 movie The Hoodlum Priest, starring Don Murray, depicted the life of Dismas Clark. Many scenes were filmed in St. Louis, including scenes on Produce Row—which still looks the same today—and the Mill Creek neighborhood as it was being torn down. Several scenes were filmed downtown in front of a strip joint and sleazy bar which were later torn down in the 1960s to revitalize downtown St. Louis. Father Clark died in 1963, an exhausted man. In the weeks before his death, he had worked hard in a futile fight to save a young man from Missouri's gas chamber.

== The Frank Sinatra Spectacular ==
During his life, Dismas Clark received support from the Teamsters Union which often provided jobs for the men at Dismas House. Harold J. Gibbons was the local Teamsters president. In 1965, Gibbons invited Frank Sinatra to do a fundraiser for Dismas House in St. Louis. Sinatra produced a "summit meeting of the Rat Pack" called the Frank Sinatra Spectacular with Frank, Dean Martin, Sammy Davis Jr., and Johnny Carson as the MC. Also appearing, on Father's Day, June 20, 1965, were Count Basie and his orchestra, and a young Quincy Jones, as the conductor of the Frank Sinatra musical portion of the show, Kaye Stevens, and Trini Lopez. A tape of the show was rediscovered, screened at the Museum of Television and Radio from 11 April 1997, and later broadcast on Nick at Nite and TV LAND. The show can be seen on YouTube. It was released as part of a CD/DVD Live and Swingin’: The Ultimate Rat Pack Collection. American Public Television distributed it to PBS member stations.
