= The Hoodlum Priest =

1961 American film directed by Irvin Kershner

- DVD cover
- Directed by: Irvin Kershner
- Written by: Joseph Landon; Don Deer
- Produced by: Walter Wood
- Starring: Don Murray
- Cinematography: Haskell Wexler
- Edited by: Maurice Wright
- Music by: Richard Markowitz
- Production company: Murray-Wood Productions
- Distributed by: United Artists
- Release date: March 26, 1961
- Running time: 101 minutes
- Country: United States
- Language: English
- Box office: $1.3 million

The Hoodlum Priest is a 1961 American drama film directed by Irvin Kershner, based on the life of Father Charles "Dismas" Clark of St. Louis, who ministered to men in prison and men coming out of prison. During his career Fr. Clark earned the nickname "The Hoodlum Priest". The film was entered into the 1961 Cannes Film Festival. The movie stars Don Murray who also co-produced and co-wrote the screenplay under the pseudonym Don Deer.

== Plot ==
Father Charles Dismas Clark, a Jesuit priest in St. Louis, dedicates his life to the rehabilitation of delinquents and ex-convicts. By meeting them on their own terms and talking their language, he wins their confidence and their trust. He is primarily concerned with a young thief, Billy Lee Jackson, recently released from the Missouri State Penitentiary. Father Clark helps clear the boy of some trumped-up charges and then gets him an honest job with a produce market. Billy's rehabilitation is further encouraged by Ellen Henley, a young socialite with whom he falls in love. Meanwhile, aided by Louis Rosen, a successful criminal lawyer, Father Clark raises enough funds to open Halfway House, a shelter for ex-convicts readjusting to civilian life. All goes well until Billy's employer fires him for a theft he did not commit. Embittered, he and a friend, Pio, attempt to rob the produce market. They are caught by one of the owners, and he attacks Billy with a crowbar. The panic-stricken boy grabs a gun and kills him. The police chase Billy to an abandoned house, and he hides there until Father Clark persuades him to surrender. Tried and convicted of murder, he is sentenced to death. Before Billy dies in the gas chamber, Father Clark reassures him by telling him of Dismas, the thief who died on the cross, and of how Christ promised him eternal life. After the execution, Father Clark returns to Halfway House and finds his first client, Pio, drunk and repentant.

== Cast ==
- Don Murray as Father Charles Dismas Clark
- Larry Gates as Louis Rosen
- Cindi Wood as Ellen Henley
- Keir Dullea as Billy Lee Jackson
- Logan Ramsey as George Hale
- Don Joslyn as Pio Gentile
- Sam Capuano as Mario Mazziotti
- Vince O'Brien as Assistant District Attorney
- Al Mack as Judge Garrity
- Lou Martini as Angelo Mazziotri
- Norman McKay as Father Dunne
- Joseph Cusanelli as Hector Sterne
- Bill Atwood as Weasel
- Roger Ray (actor) as Detective Shattuck
- William Warford as Assistant District Attorney's Aide
- Willard Capen as Extra behind bars in DVD cover

== Reception ==
A.H. Weiler of The New York Times wrote: "An unrelievedly grim, serious and action-filled case against an uncompromising attitude toward former convicts and capital punishment, it evolves, through an unpretentious, documentary treatment, as tough and persuasive, if disquieting, drama...There is no doubt, however, as to the film's sharp, authentic pictorial look, since it was photographed largely in St. Louis, whose lower depths rise strikingly before an audience. Its cheap saloons, alleys and slums, photographed in newsreel detail by Haskell Wexler, lend polish and support to the fast pace maintained by the director, Irvin Kershner, whose experience stems largely from television."

== See also ==
- List of American films of 1961
