= Alfonso J. Cervantes =

American politician (1920–1983)

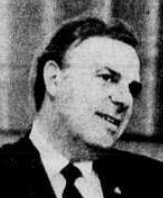
- Alfonso J. Cervantes

39th Mayor of St. Louis
- In office 1965–1973
- Preceded by: Raymond Tucker
- Succeeded by: John Poelker

Personal details
- Born: August 27, 1920 St. Louis, Missouri, U.S.
- Died: June 23, 1983 (aged 62) St. Louis, Missouri, U.S.
- Party: Democratic
- Spouse: Carmen Davis
- Children: 6
- Education: St. Louis University BA
- Profession: Mayor

Alfonso Juan Cervantes (August 27, 1920 – June 23, 1983) was the 39th Mayor of St. Louis, Missouri, from 1965 to 1973.

== Personal life and early political career ==
Born in St. Louis, Cervantes attended St. Louis University High School and Saint Louis University before serving in the Merchant Marine during World War II. He married the former Carmen Davis, and they had six children. Cervantes' political career began in 1949 when he was elected to the St. Louis Board of Aldermen representing the 15th Ward. He was reelected to that position in 1953 and 1957. In 1955 he was unsuccessful in a citywide bid for President of the Board of Aldermen. He was elected to that post in 1959, but was defeated in a bid for reelection in 1963.

== Term as mayor ==
In 1965, Cervantes challenged incumbent Mayor Raymond Tucker, who was seeking an unprecedented fourth term in office. He defeated Tucker by a vote of 83,698 to 68,379 in the primary. A third candidate, John Noel, received 1,087 votes. Cervantes won the general election on April 6, 1965, defeating Republican Maurice R. Zumwalt, by a vote of 102,961 to 47,510. He was reelected to a second term in 1969, over Republican Gerald G. Fischer.

During his term as mayor, Cervantes focused in particular on the issues of race relations, crime-fighting, and city finance. While many other large cities suffered through race riots during the late 1960s, the peace was kept in St. Louis. Mayor Cenvantes met with and talked at length with African American leaders and included African-Americans in City government positions and city commissions.

During Cervantes' term a Commission on Crime and Law Enforcement was created, although Life Magazine accused Cervantes and the head of the Commission, lawyer Morris Shenker, of strong ties to organized crime. Voters passed a one per cent sales tax to put policemen on horseback in city parks. Car thefts were reduced by his 'lock it and pocket the key' program. Mayor Cervantes was successful in getting a $2,000,000 bond issue passed for completion of the Gateway Arch and grounds. This was necessary to get $6,000,000 in Federal aid. A $15,000,000 bond issue for street lighting and a juvenile center was passed in 1972.

Other successes during his two terms included establishment of Night Housing Court, organization of a Business Development Commission to help keep businesses in the City and bring in new ones along with setting up the Area Office of Aging, Beautification Commission, and Citizens Service Bureau to handle complaints. The Land Reutilization Authority was created to take over vacant properties and group them for re-use.

Mayor Cervantes failed in his attempt to get a new airport started in Illinois, close to downtown St. Louis. He thought this would be a great benefit to the City and downtown St. Louis, but the proposal generated great controversy and helped lead to his defeat for a third term in 1973. Cervantes was defeated in that bid by John Poelker in the Democratic primary. Cervantes was defeated in another bid for mayor in 1977 by James F. Conway. Another Cervantes controversy was allowing the demolition of Pruitt Igoe, which left thousands of residents homeless.

== Later life ==
After serving as mayor, Cervantes taught at St. Louis University and returned as an active manager of his business interests, including Cervantes and Associates Insurance Agency and the Laclede Cab Company. Cervantes also published a memoir entitled Mr. Mayor. Cervantes died in St. Louis on June 23, 1983, at age 62. He was buried in Calvary Cemetery.

What is currently the America's Center convention center complex was originally named for Cervantes in 1977.

Political offices
Preceded by Raymond Tucker	Mayor of St. Louis; 1965 – 1973	Succeeded by John Poelker
