= John Poelker =

American politician

John Henry Poelker (April 14, 1913 – February 9, 1990) was the 40th mayor of St. Louis from 1973 to 1977. He was a Democrat.

John H. Poelker served 10 years as comptroller prior to his one term as Mayor. (He did not seek re-election.) He began his political career in 1953 when he became the city's youngest assessor, although later on as mayor, he oversaw the demolition of Pruitt Igoe.

Poelker died on February 9, 1990, at the age of 76.

Political offices
Preceded by Alfonso J. Cervantes	Mayor of St. Louis; 1973–1977	Succeeded by James F. Conway
