= Don Murray (actor) =

American actor (1929–2024)

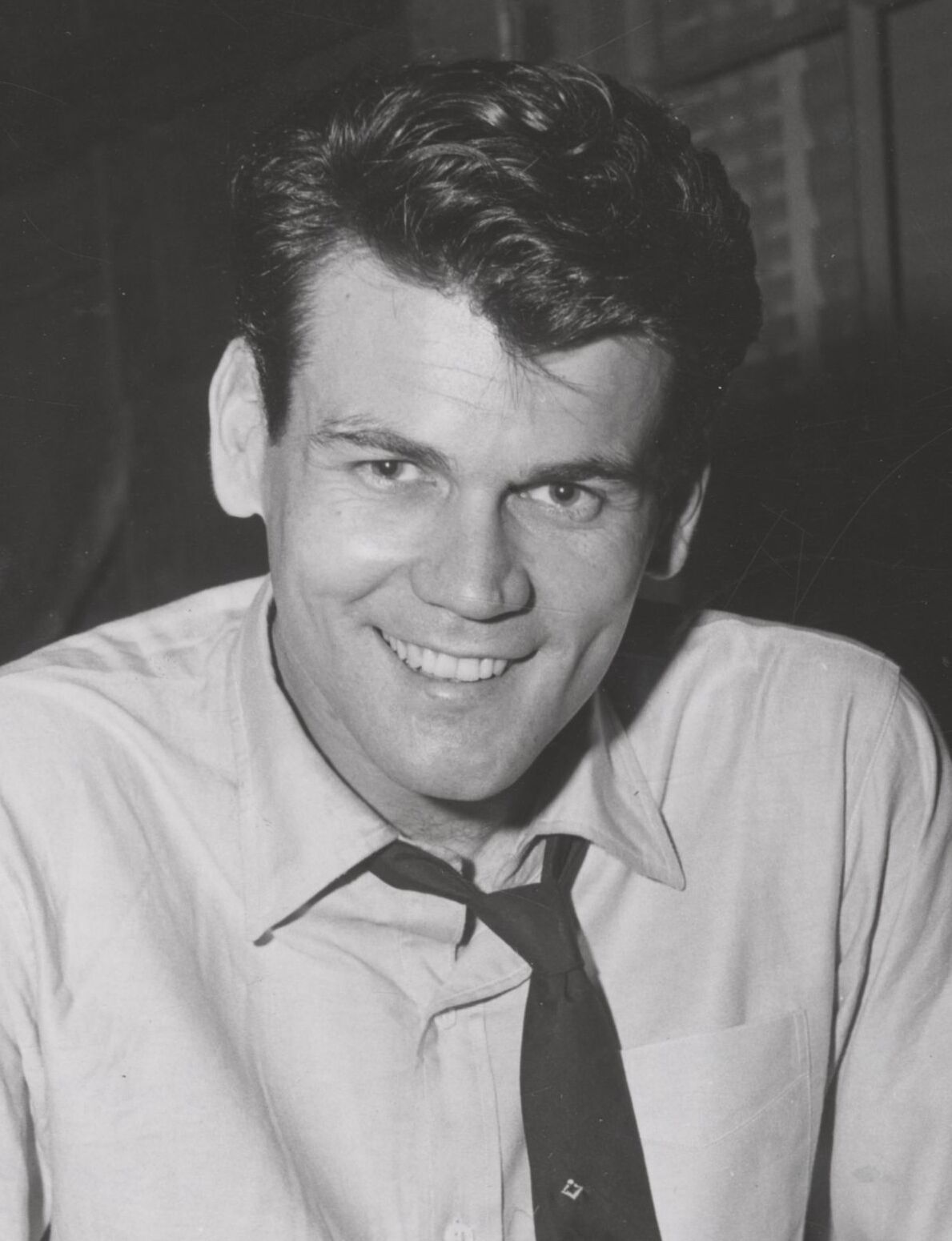
- Murray in 1960
- Born: Donald Patrick Murray; July 31, 1929; Los Angeles, California, U.S.
- Died: February 2, 2024 (aged 94); Goleta, California, U.S.
- Education: American Academy of Dramatic Arts
- Occupations: Actor, screenwriter, film director
- Years active: 1950–2001; 2017–2021
- Spouses: Hope Lange (m. 1956; div. 1961); Bettie Johnson (m. 1962)
- Children: 5, including Christopher and Sean

Donald Patrick Murray (July 31, 1929 – February 2, 2024) was an American actor, screenwriter, and film director. His debut film role as Bo Decker in Bus Stop (1956), opposite Marilyn Monroe, earned him an Academy Award nomination for Best Supporting Actor. He subsequently had several major leading and supporting roles in films during the 1950s and '60s, including A Hatful of Rain (1957), Shake Hands with the Devil (1959, with James Cagney), One Foot in Hell (1960, with Alan Ladd), Advise & Consent (1962, with Henry Fonda and Charles Laughton), and Baby the Rain Must Fall (1965, with Steve McQueen and Lee Remick).

Murray also starred in several television series, notably as Earl Corey on The Outcasts (1968–69), Sid Fairgate on Knots Landing (1979–81), and Bushnell Mullins on Twin Peaks (2017). He also played a villain in the science-fiction film Conquest of the Planet of the Apes (1972) and the father of Kathleen Turner's character in Peggy Sue Got Married (1986). His screenwriting credits include The Hoodlum Priest (1961), a biopic of Jesuit priest Dismas Clark he also starred in and co-produced. In 1970, he wrote and directed The Cross and the Switchblade, based on the life of evangelists David Wilkerson and Nicky Cruz.

== Early life and education ==
Donald Patrick Murray was born in Los Angeles on July 31, 1929, the second of three children, to Dennis Aloisius Murray, a Broadway dance director and stage manager, and Ethel Murray (née Cook), a former Ziegfeld Follies performer.

Murray attended East Rockaway High School (class of 1947) in East Rockaway, New York, where he played football and was on the track team. He was a member of the student government and glee club, and joined the Alpha Phi chapter of the Omega Gamma Delta Fraternity. After graduating, he studied at the American Academy of Dramatic Arts. Soon after graduating from the AADA, he made his Broadway debut as Jack Hunter in The Rose Tattoo (1951).

A member of the Church of the Brethren, Murray registered as a conscientious objector during the Korean War, when many young American men were being drafted into the armed forces. Murray was assigned to alternative service in Europe, where he helped orphans and war casualties.

== Career ==
In 1954, Murray returned from Europe to the U.S. and acting. He starred alongside Mary Martin in the stage version of The Skin of Our Teeth. Upon seeing his performance in the play, director Joshua Logan cast him in 20th Century Fox's film adaptation of William Inge's play Bus Stop.

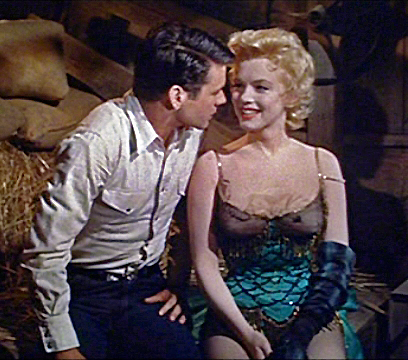
With Marilyn Monroe in Bus Stop (1956)

Murray's role as Beauregard "Beau" Decker in Bus Stop (1956) marked his film debut. He starred alongside Marilyn Monroe, who played Cherie, the object of his desire. His performance as the innocent cowboy determined to get Cherie was well received, and he was nominated for a BAFTA for Most Promising Newcomer and for the Academy Award for Best Supporting Actor.

In 1957, Murray starred as reserved, married bookkeeper Charlie Sampson in The Bachelor Party. That same year he had one of his most successful roles, the morphine-addicted Korean War veteran Johnny Pope in the drama A Hatful of Rain. Despite director Fred Zinnemann's intention to cast Murray as the comical brother Polo, Murray insisted on playing the lead. The film was one of the first to show the effects of drug abuse on addicts and the people around them.

Murray starred as a blackmailed United States senator in Advise & Consent (1962), a film version of a Pulitzer Prize-winning novel by Allen Drury. The movie was directed by Otto Preminger and co-starred Henry Fonda and Charles Laughton. Murray co-starred with Steve McQueen in Baby the Rain Must Fall (1965) and played the ape-hating Governor Breck in Conquest of the Planet of the Apes (1972).

In 1976, Murray starred in the film Deadly Hero. In addition to acting, he directed a film based on the book The Cross and the Switchblade (1970). He starred with Otis Young in the ABC western television series The Outcasts (1968–69), featuring an interracial bounty hunter team in the post-Civil War West.

In 1979, Murray starred as Sid Fairgate on the prime-time soap opera Knots Landing. He also scripted two episodes of the show in 1980. In 1981, Murray left the series after two seasons either to concentrate on other projects, or, according to some sources, over a salary dispute. The character's death was notable at the time because it was considered rare to kill off a star character. The death came in the second episode of season three, following season two's cliffhanger in which Sid's car careened off a cliff. To make viewers doubt the character had actually died, Murray was listed in the credit sequence for season three; in fact, season three revealed that Fairgate had survived the plunge off the cliff (thus temporarily reassuring the viewers), but died shortly afterward in a hospital. Although he effectively distanced himself from the series after that, Murray contributed an interview segment for the 2005 reunion special Knots Landing: Together Again.

On Broadway, Murray played the title role in the short-lived musical Smith, was a replacement for Ted Bessell in the original run of Bernard Slade's Same Time, Next Year, and starred in Alan Ayckbourn's The Norman Conquests. In 1977-78, he starred in the national US touring production of Neil Simon's California Suite.

In 2017, 16 years after his last screen role, Murray came out of retirement to play Bushnell Mullins in the third season of Twin Peaks.

== Retrospective ==
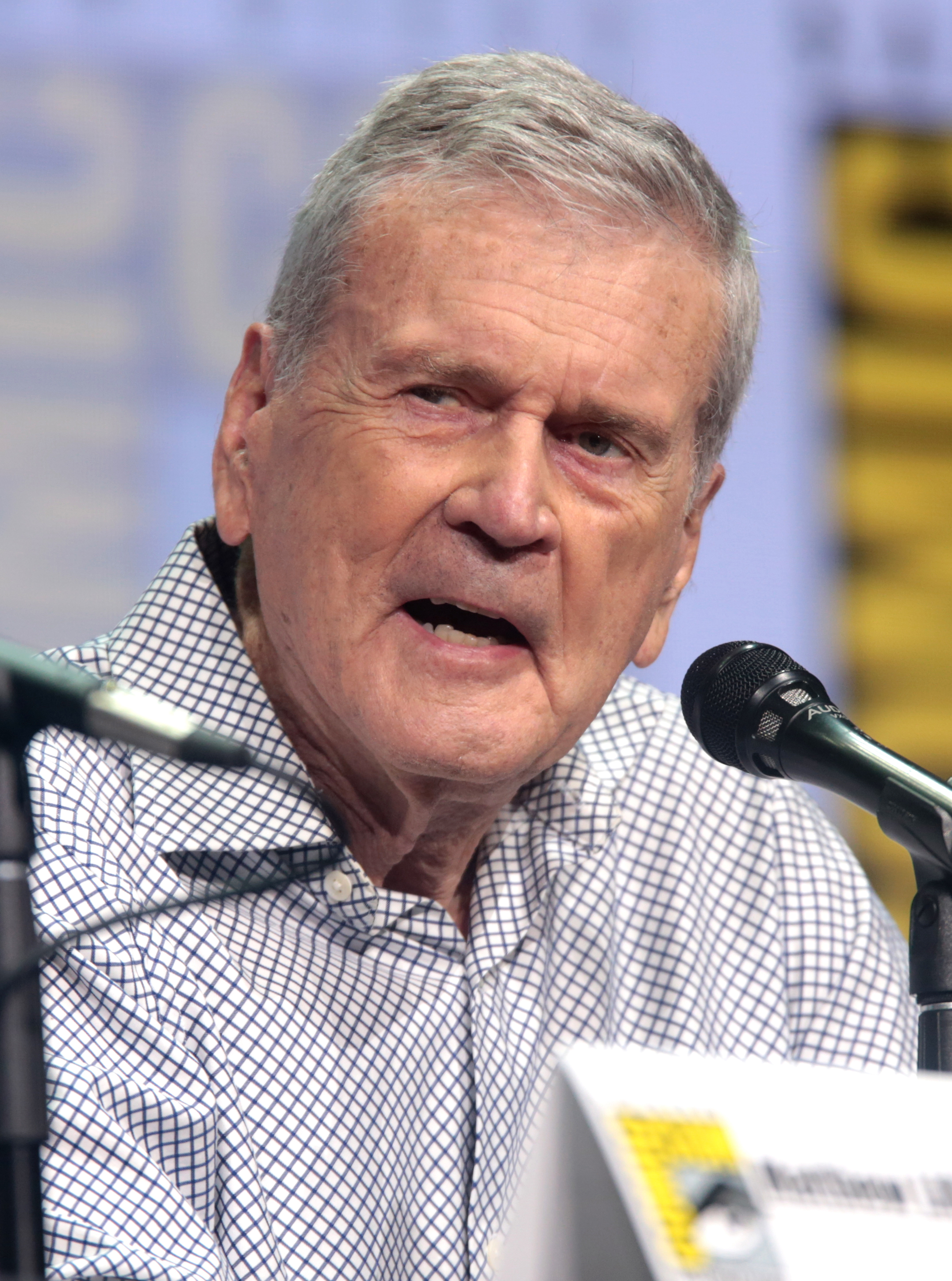
Murray at the 2017 San Diego Comic-Con

In July 2014, a retrospective of Murray's films was held at the Roxie Theater in San Francisco.

== Personal life ==
In 1956, Murray married Hope Lange, with whom he co-starred in Bus Stop. They had two children, Christopher and Patricia. They divorced in 1961. In 1962, he married Elizabeth Johnson. They had three children, Colleen, Sean, and Michael.

Murray was a lifelong member of the Democratic Party.

=== Death ===
Murray lived in Goleta, California. He died at his home on February 2, 2024, at the age of 94.

== Filmography ==
=== Feature films ===
With Marilyn Monroe in Bus Stop (1956)

With Eva Marie Saint in A Hatful of Rain (1957)

Year	Title	Role
1956	Bus Stop	Beauregard "Bo" Decker
1957	The Bachelor Party	Charlie Samson
1957	A Hatful of Rain	Johnny Pope
1958	From Hell to Texas	Tod Lohman
1959	These Thousand Hills	Albert Gallatin "Lat" Evans
1959	Shake Hands with the Devil	Kerry O'Shea
1960	One Foot in Hell	Dan Keats
1961	The Hoodlum Priest	Father Charles Dismas Clark
1962	Advise & Consent	Senator Brigham Anderson
1962	Escape from East Berlin	Kurt Schröder
1964	One Man's Way	Norman Vincent Peale
1965	Baby the Rain Must Fall	"Slim"
1966	Kid Rodelo	"Kid" Rodelo
1966	The Plainsman	Bill "Wild Bill" Hickok
1967	Sweet Love, Bitter	David Hillary
1967	The Viking Queen	Justinian
1969	Childish Things	Tom Harris
1971	Happy Birthday, Wanda June	Herb Shuttle
1972	Call Me by My Rightful Name	Doug
1972	Justin Morgan Had a Horse	Justin Morgan
1972	Conquest of the Planet of the Apes	Governor Breck
1973	Cotter	Cotter
1975	Deadly Hero	Lacy
1981	Endless Love	Hugh Butterfield
1983	I Am the Cheese	David Farmer
1985	Radioactive Dreams	Dash Hammer
1986	Peggy Sue Got Married	Jack Kelcher
1986	Scorpion	Gifford Leese
1987	Made in Heaven	Ben Chandler
1990	Ghosts Can't Do It	Winston
2000	Internet Love	Unknown
2001	Island Prey	Parker Gaits
2001	Elvis Is Alive	Unknown
2021	Promise	Zacharias

=== Television ===
Year	Title	Role	Notes
1950	Studio One	Biondello	Episode: "The Taming of the Shrew"
1950	Kraft Television Theatre	George	Episode: "January Thaw"
1952	Kraft Television Theatre	Booth	Episode: "Mr. Lazarus"
1952	Lux Video Theatre	Jimmy	Episode: "Welcome Home, Lefty"
1955	Producers' Showcase	Henry Antrobus	Episode: "The Skin of Our Teeth"
1955	The Philco Television Playhouse	Alex Nordman	Episode: "A Man Is Ten Feet Tall"
1955	The Jane Wyman Show	Ken	Episode: "One Last September"
1956	The United States Steel Hour	Don	Episode: "Moment of Courage"
1957	Playhouse 90	Bob Munson	Episode: "For I Have Loved Strangers"
1959	The DuPont Show of the Month	Billy Budd	Episode: "Billy Budd"
1960	Playhouse 90	Randy Bragg	Episode: "Alas, Babylon"
1968–69	The Outcasts	Earl Corey	26 episodes
1972	Disneyland	Justin Morgan	2 episodes
1973	Police Story	Jack Bonner	Episode: "The Big Walk"
1973	Orson Welles Great Mysteries	Jack Stanley	Episode: "The Power of Fear"
1973	Love Story	Neil Kaplan	Episode: "The Roller Coaster Stops Here"
1974	Amy Prentiss	Connor	Episode: "The Desperate World of Jane Doe"
1975	Police Story	Sergeant Stiles	Episode: "Headhunter"
1977	How the West Was Won	Anderson	3 episodes
1979–81	Knots Landing	Sid Fairgate	34 episodes
1986	T.J. Hooker	Senator Stuart Grayle	Episode: "Blood Sport"
1987	Matlock	Albert Gordon	Episode: "The Billionaire"
1987	Hotel	Sam Burton	Episode: "Controlling Interests"
1989	ABC Afterschool Special	Jack Karpinsky	Episode: "My Dad Can't Be Crazy... Can He?"
1989–90	Brand New Life	Roger Gibbons	6 episodes
1991	Sons and Daughters	Bing Hammersmith	6 episodes
1993	ABC Afterschool Special	Frank Morrow	Episode: "Montan Crossroads"
1993	Murder, She Wrote	Wally Hampton	Episode: "Bloodlines"
1995	Wings	Dad	Episode: "Burnin' Down the House: Part 2"
1996	The Single Guy	Chip Bremley	Episode: "Distance"
1998	The Wonderful World of Disney	Reporter	Episode: "Mr. Headmistress"
1999	Soldier of Fortune, Inc.	John James / Colonel Quentin Shepherd	Episode: "White Dragon"
2017	Twin Peaks	Bushnell Mullins	8 episodes

==== Television films and miniseries ====
Year	Title	Role
1959	Winterset	Mio
1967	The Borgia Stick	Tom Harrison
1969	Daughter of the Mind	Dr. Alex Lauder
1970	The Intruders	Sam Garrison
1973	The Girl on the Late, Late Show	William Martin
1974	The Sex Symbol	Senator Grant O'Neal
1975	A Girl Named Sooner	Sheriff Phil Rotteman
1978	Rainbow	Frank Gumm
1979	Crisis in Mid-Air	Adam Travis
1980	If Things Were Different	Robert Langford
1980	The Boy Who Drank Too Much	Ken Saunders
1980	Police Story: Confessions of a Lady Cop	Sergeant Jack Leland
1980	Fugitive Family	Peter Ritchie
1981	Return of the Rebels	Sonny Morgan
1983	Thursday's Child	Parker Alden
1983	Branagan and Mapes	Dan Branagan
1983	Quarterback Princess	Ralph Maida
1984	License to Kill	Tom Fiske
1984	A Touch of Scandal	Benjamin Gilvey
1986	Something in Common	Theo Fontana
1987	Stillwatch	Sam Kingsley
1987	The Stepford Children	Steven Harding
1987	Mistress	Wyn
1996	Hearts Adrift	Lloyd Raines
1998	Mr. Headmistress	Reporter

== Awards and nominations ==
Year	Award	Category	Nominated work	Result	Ref.
1956	Academy Awards	Best Supporting Actor	Bus Stop	Nominated	
1956	British Academy Film Awards	Most Promising Newcomer to Film	Bus Stop	Nominated	
1994	Daytime Emmy Awards	Outstanding Performer in a Children's Special	ABC Afterschool Special (for "Montana Crossroads")	Nominated	
2009	TV Land Awards	Anniversary Award	Knots Landing	Nominated	

For his contributions to motion pictures, Murray has a star on the Hollywood Walk of Fame at 6385 Hollywood Boulevard.
