= Raymond Tucker =

American politician (1896–1970)

38th Mayor of St. Louis
- In office 1953–1965
- Preceded by: Joseph Darst
- Succeeded by: Alfonso J. Cervantes

22nd President of the United States Conference of Mayors
- In office December 1963–April 20, 1965
- Preceded by: Arthur L. Selland
- Succeeded by: Neal Blaisdell

32nd President of the National League of Cities
- In office 1960
- Preceded by: Anthony J. Celebrezze
- Succeeded by: Don Hummel

St. Louis Director of Public Safety
- In office 1940–1941

Personal details
- Born: December 4, 1896 St. Louis, Missouri, U.S.
- Died: November 23, 1970 (aged 73)
- Party: Democratic
- Spouse: Mary Edythe Leiber
- Children: 2
- Education: Columbia University; Washington University in St. Louis

Raymond Tucker (December 4, 1896 – November 23, 1970) was an American politician who served as the 38th mayor of St. Louis from 1953 until 1965.

== Personal life and early career ==
Tucker was born in St. Louis, Missouri, and was a 1913 graduate of St. Louis University High School. He later received degrees from Columbia University and Washington University in St. Louis. He married the former Mary Edythe Leiber in 1928 and they had two children. From 1921 to 1934, he taught mechanical engineering at McKelvey School of Engineering at Washington University and was chairman of the department from 1921 to 1951.

Tucker served in Mayor Bernard F. Dickmann's administration from 1934 to 1937, during which time he served as City Smoke Commissioner. From 1939 to 1941, he was secretary to Mayor Dickmann's Survey and Audit Committee which sponsored the Griffenhagen Report on St. Louis City Government. In part of 1940 and 1941, he was Director of Public Safety.

Tucker was a member of the committee appointed to write the City's first Civil Service Ordinance in 1940. He headed the 1949 Charter Board of Freeholders whose plan was defeated at the polls in August, 1950. St. Louis' Civil Defense was his responsibility from January 1951 to February 1953. The St. Louis Newspaper Guild gave him the "Page One Award" for civic achievement in 1952. In 1956, he received the St. Louis Award for rallying citizens to work for civic improvement.

== Term as mayor ==
In 1953, Tucker won the Democratic nomination for mayor in a primary election against Mark D. Eagleton, and was elected in April 1953. During his first term the Earnings Tax was made a permanent part of the City's financial system. A $1,500,000 Plaza Bond Issue was passed in September 1953 and, in May 1955, a $110,000,000 Bond Issue, to support over twenty types of city improvements, was also passed. The City's water supply underwent fluoridation in September 1955. Tucker supported the adoption of the plan for the Metropolitan Sewer District in 1954.

In his first term, Tucker established the Industrial and Commercial Development Commission and worked closely with Civic Progress, an insiders club of business leaders, to envision urban renewal projects. Tucker proposed a major plan with funding from the 1949 Housing Act, a local bond line passed in 1955, and private capital investments. Key to the plan was the destruction of Mill Creek Valley and Kosciusko neighborhoods for planned industrial zones.

Tucker ran for re-election successfully in 1957. He backed the proposed City Charter that was defeated August 6, 1957. The increase in the Earnings Tax from one-half percent to one percent became effective August 1, 1959. He opposed the Metropolitan District Plan of 1959 and the Borough Plan of 1962; each would have restructured the relationship between St. Louis City and St. Louis County. He became president of the American Municipal Association (now the National League of Cities) in 1959 and headed the United States Conference of Mayors from December 1963 to April 20, 1965. The City Charter was amended in August 1960 to raise the City salary limit from $10,000 to $25,000. In 1956, the mayor had appointed a committee of building industry people to draw up a new Building Code, which he signed into law on March 31, 1961.

In April 1961, Tucker was elected to a third term as mayor. Significant civil rights legislation was passed in the City during this time, including the Public Accommodations Ordinance in 1961 and Fair Employment legislation in 1963.

In March 1965, during his bid for an unprecedented fourth term as mayor, Tucker lost to Alfonso J. Cervantes in the Democratic primary.

A 1993 survey of historians, political scientists and urban experts conducted by Melvin G. Holli of the University of Illinois at Chicago ranked Tucker as the thirteenth-best American big-city mayor to have served between the years 1820 and 1993.

== Later life ==
Later in 1965, following his service as mayor, Tucker became Professor of Urban Affairs at Washington University. He died in St. Louis on November 23, 1970. He is buried in Calvary Cemetery.

Political offices
Preceded by Joseph Darst	Mayor of St. Louis; 1953–1965	Succeeded by Alfonso J. Cervantes
