= Futterman =

Futterman is a surname. Notable people with the surname include:

- Dan Futterman (born 1967), American actor and screenwriter
- Joel Futterman (born 1946), American jazz pianist and curved soprano saxophonist
- Julius Futterman (1907–1981), American electronic engineer, developed the OTL amplifier
- Nika Futterman (born 1969), American voice actress
- Robert A. Futterman (1928–1961), American real estate investor and author
- Robert K. Futterman (born 1958), American executive officer of Robert K. Futterman & Associates
