= Midtown St. Louis =

Neighborhood of St. Louis in Missouri, US

Coordinates: 38.6356°N 90.2287°W

Midtown
- Neighborhood of St. Louis
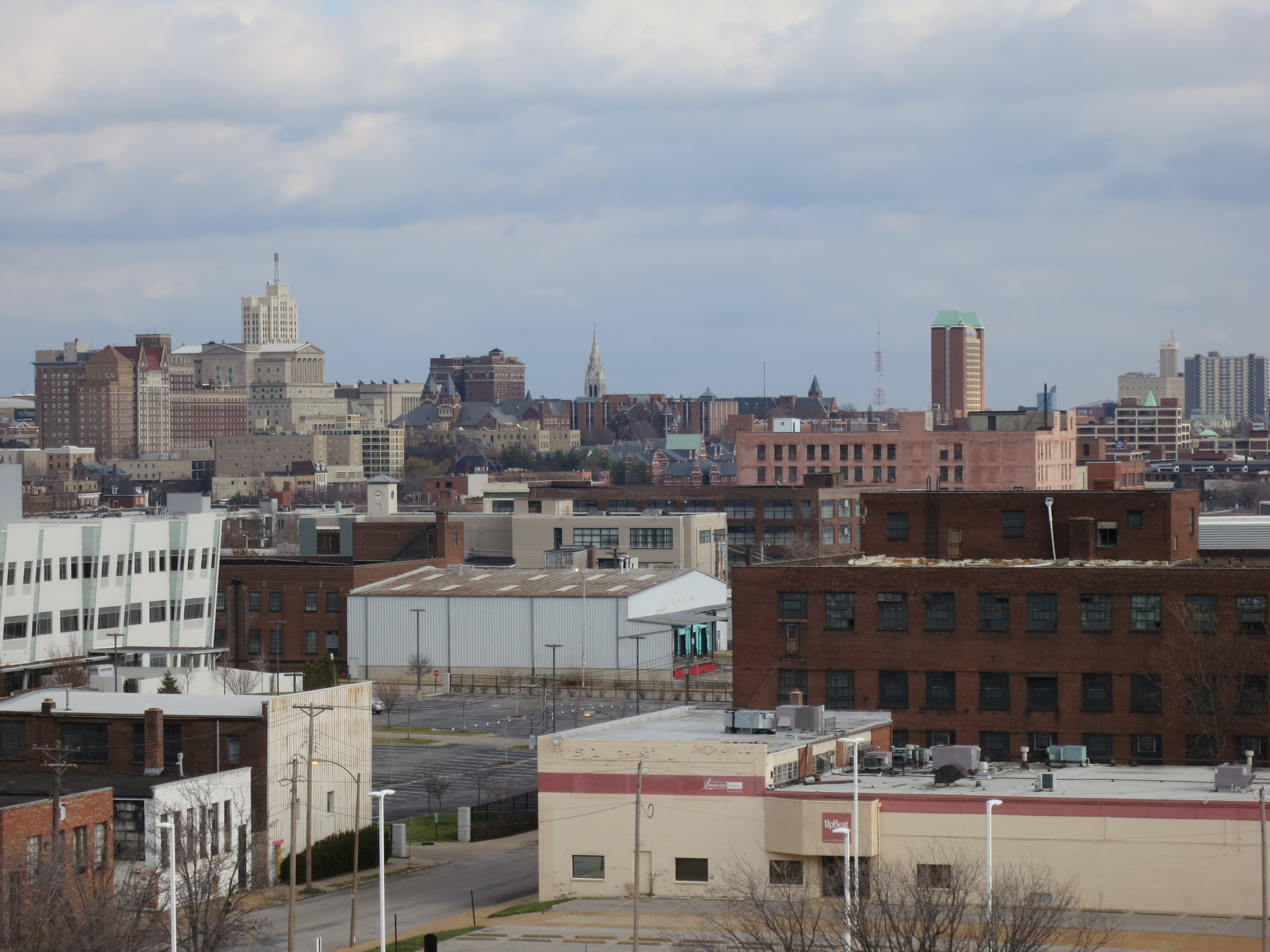
- View of Midtown, December 2012

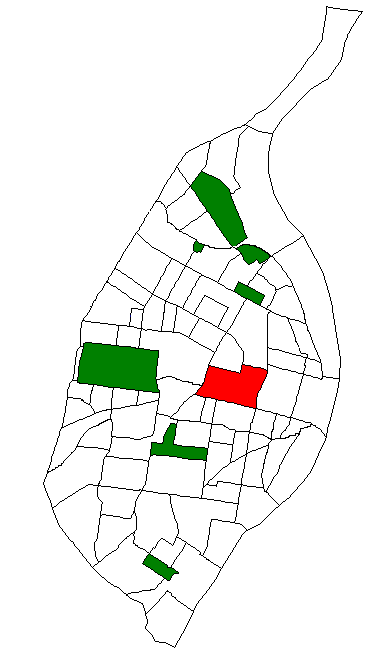
- Location (red) of Midtown within St. Louis
- Country: United States
- State: Missouri
- City: St. Louis
- Wards: 11

Government
  - Aldermen: Laura Keys

Area
  - Total: 1.35 sq mi (3.5 km^{2})

Population (2020)
  - Total: 6,862
  - Density: 5,080/sq mi (1,960/km^{2})
- ZIP code(s): Parts of 63103, 63108, 63110
- Area code(s): 314
- Website: stlouis-mo.gov

Midtown is a neighborhood in St. Louis, Missouri. It is located 3 miles (4.8 km) west of the city riverfront at the intersection of Grand and Lindell Boulevards. It is home to the campus of Saint Louis University.

== History ==
The only American Civil War battle in St. Louis, the Camp Jackson Affair, took place on May 10, 1861, when Union military forces clashed with civilians after capturing the Confederate Missouri Volunteer Militia commanded by General Daniel M. Frost. The Militia had been dispatched to St. Louis by Missouri Governor Claiborne Fox Jackson to seize the St. Louis Arsenal, and secure 40,000 rifles and muskets for the Confederacy. It camped outside St. Louis at Lindell's Grove which was renamed "Camp Jackson" by the militiamen. The site of Camp Jackson is on the campus of Saint Louis University in Midtown, and is commemorated by a historical marker near the university's Busch Student Center. United States (Union) Army Captain, later General, Nathaniel Lyon marched from the Arsenal on the St. Louis riverfront to the rural site of Camp Jackson with a mixed force of 6,000 Regular Army troops and Home Guard volunteers. Frost surrendered to Lyon without a fight. However, after capturing Camp Jackson, Union Forces clashed with civilian bystanders resulting in the deaths of at least 28 people including Captain Constantin Blandowski, the first Union officer killed in the Civil War.

Residential and commercial development of Midtown followed the Civil War as St. Louis expanded west in the 1870s. By the 1920s Midtown was a bustling district akin to New York City's Times Square. Midtown deteriorated rapidly after World War II. However, in the 1970s, Father Paul C. Reinert, President of Saint Louis University, inspired the urban renewal effort to rehabilitate the neighborhood and make use of its surviving buildings -- an effort that is largely continued today.

== Historic status ==
The Midtown Historic District was placed on the National Register of Historic Places by the National Park Service, United States Department of the Interior in 1979.

== Architecture ==
A collection of eclectic structures built between 1874 and 1930 range from Midtown's oldest building, a classic Second Empire style townhouse at 3534 Washington Ave. built during the first phase of Midtown development to flamboyant early 20th century commercial buildings like the Art Deco Continental Life Building and the "Siamese Byzantine" Fox Theatre. Buildings in the district were designed by notable architects including Henry Hobson Richardson, Eames and Young, William B. Ittner, Preston J. Bradshaw, C. Howard Crane, Brad Cloepfil and Tadao Ando.

== Adaptive reuse of historic structures ==
Many of Midtown's surviving historic structures have been restored and adapted for new uses. A once dilapidated movie palace, the Neo-classical Powell Hall, is now home to the St. Louis Symphony. Similarly, the Fox Theatre is now the city's premier live performance venue. Buildings designed for worship are performing arts centers (Sheldon Concert Hall and the Grandel Theatre). The Continental-Life Building and the University Club Building that originally housed offices are now apartment buildings. Single family residences have been converted into elegant professional offices (City House in Grand Center, 3534 Washington Ave. and the Lionberger House, 3630 Grandel Square). Former clubhouse buildings serve as art centers: The St. Louis Club Building, 3663 Lindell Blvd., is now the Saint Louis University Museum of Art and The Knights of Columbus Building, 3547 Olive Street, is the Centene Center for the Arts, housing the St. Louis Arts and Education Council and numerous arts agencies.

The St. Louis Armory, originally built in 1938 for the Missouri National Guard, was repurposed as a tennis center, and, most recently, as an entertainment space, with bars and live music. In 2024, the Armory closed indefinitely, with its building owner claiming they were seeking additional financing for its reopening.

== New construction ==
As Midtown revived, new art museums, including the Pulitzer Arts Foundation and the Contemporary Art Museum, were built in 2001 and 2003, respectively. Additionally, the 1998 Dana Brown Communications Center (home of KETC) has become a focal point for public broadcasting and new media.

=== City Foundry ===
City Foundry is a $220 million, 15-acre project that was undertaken by the Lawrence Group and CEO Steve Smith, who sought to create a new recreational and business complex in the center of Midtown, St. Louis. The idea for this new hub came about when Smith visited the Ponce City Market and Krog Street Market, two mixed-use development buildings in Atlanta, Georgia, and was inspired to bring the same idea back to part of St. Louis. The project is located in the heart of Midtown St. Louis, Missouri, with the goal of promoting economic development within the shrinking city. Specifically, the project is using infill development to turn the former Century Electric Company, one of the top 3 manufacturers in the city 100 years ago which closed in 2007, into a recreational and business complex containing a food hall, public market, and retail businesses. By using a biophilic design, creating a pedestrian-only walkway, and connecting the recreational and business complex to the Brickline Greenway, the hub attempts to foster greater social connection and act as a destination spot within the city, bringing the community and visitors together to foster a greater sense of belonging. The project was broken into four different phases. The first phase focused on the renovation of the foundry and the creation of the food hall and a 500-car parking garage. The second phase focused on the creation of a 24-story apartment building that targeted individuals from different universities in the city. The third and fourth phases focused on building two multi-story office buildings, commercial space, and additional parking avenues. Funding for this project came from tax incentives as well as private companies, two of which include Bull Moose Industries located in Chesterfield, Missouri, and CapStone Holdings located in Bonita Springs, Florida. Although the recreational and business complex was scheduled to open in the spring of 2020, there was a delayed opening due to the coronavirus pandemic. The Food Hall opened to the public in August 2021.

== Demographics ==
Historical population
Year	Pop.	±%
1990	4,412	—
2000	4,408	−0.1%
2010	5,652	+28.2%
2020	6,862	+21.4%

In 2020 Midtown's racial makeup was 47.7% White, 34.7% Black, 0.2% American Indian, 9.7% Asian, 4.1% Two or More Races, and 3.6% Some Other Race. 3.9% of the people were of Hispanic or Latino origin.

Racial composition	1990	2000	2010	2020
White	30.7%	65.2%	61.9%	47.7%
Black or African American	65.8%	27.3%	25.8%	34.7%
Hispanic or Latino (of any race)		3.1%	2.8%	3.9%
Asian		4.6%	9.2%	9.7%
Two or More Races		1.6%	2.0%	4.1%

== Gallery ==
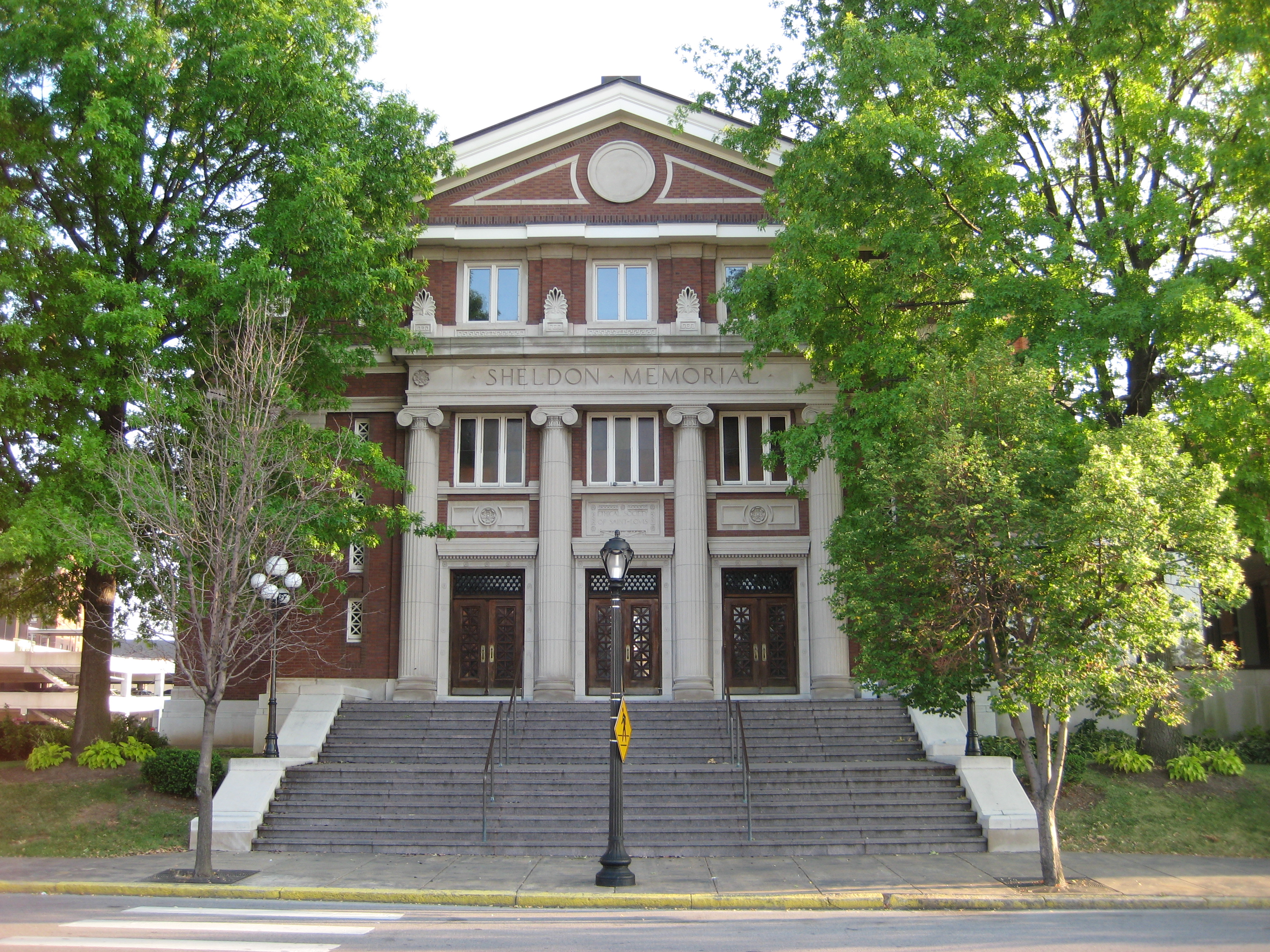
The Sheldon Concert Hall, 1912

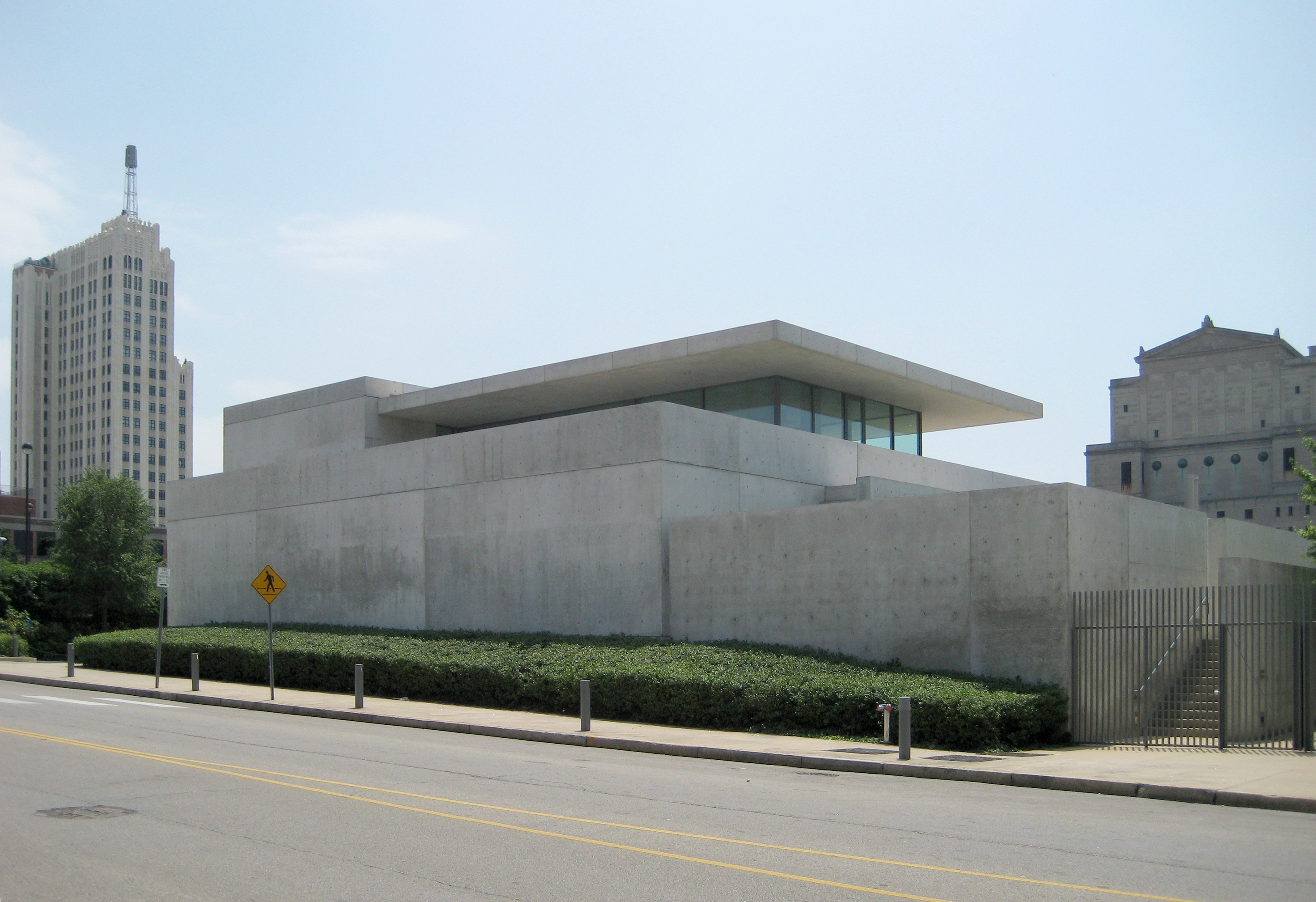
Pulitzer Arts Foundation, 2001

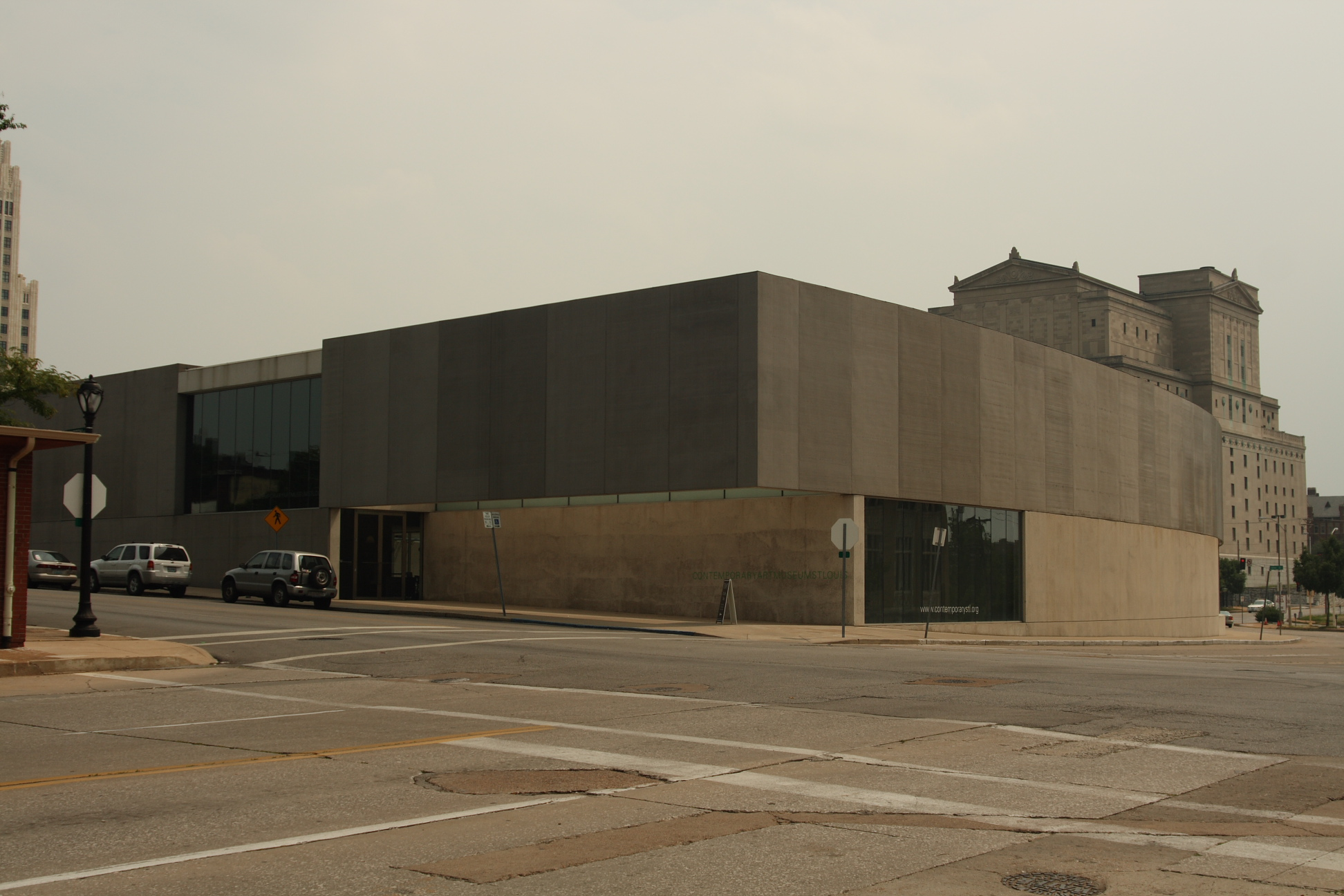
Contemporary Art Museum St. Louis, 2003

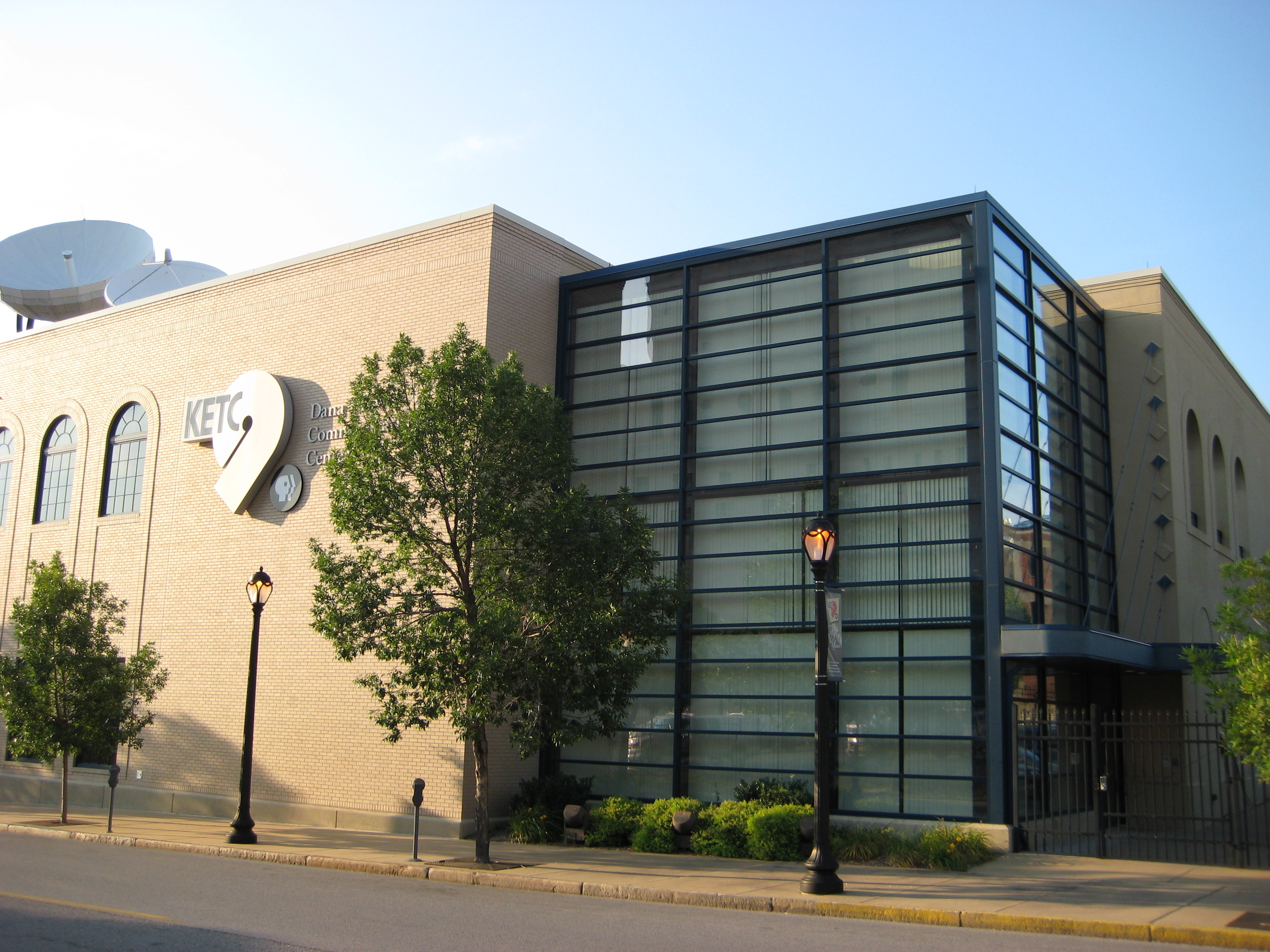
KETC, 1998

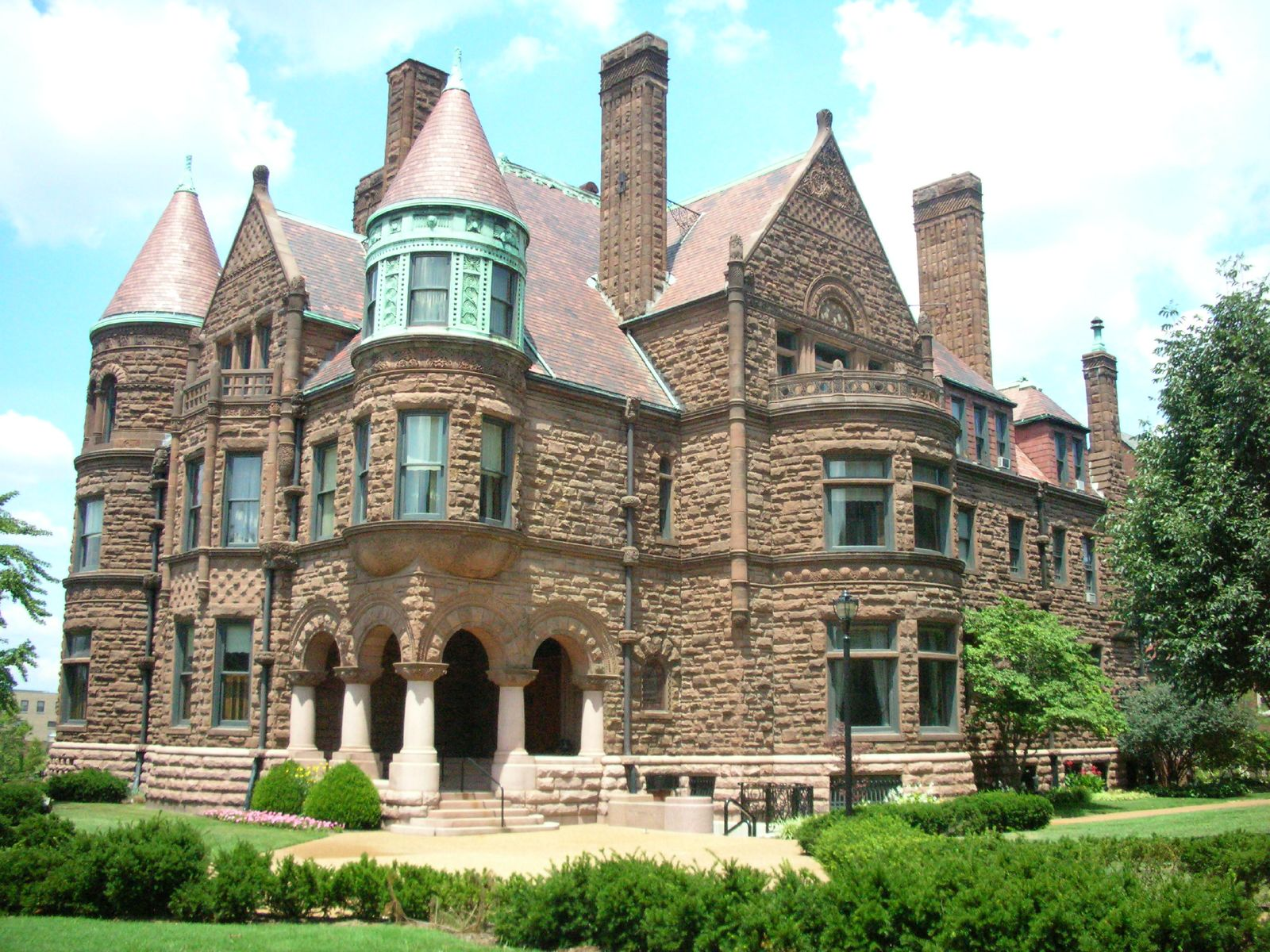
Cupples House, Saint Louis University, 1890

Saint Louis University Museum of Art, 1899

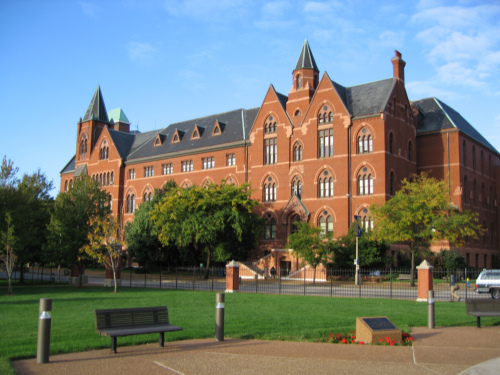
Dubourg Hall, 1888

== See also ==
- Grand Center Arts District
- Saint Louis University
- Architecture of St. Louis
- Neighborhoods of St. Louis
- National Register of Historic Places listings in St. Louis (city, A-L)
- National Register of Historic Places listings in St. Louis (city, M-Z)
