= Buckingham Hotel =

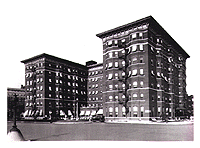
- Original hotel building

- Former location in St. Louis Buckingham Hotel (the United States)

General information
- Location: St. Louis, Missouri
- Coordinates: 38°38′34″N 90°15′52″W
- Owner: Buckingham Realty Company

Technical details
- Floor count: 7

Other information
- Number of rooms: 450

Buckingham Hotel, later the Ambassador Hotel, was an upmarket hotel which existed in St. Louis, Missouri, United States, in the early 20th century. It was located on North Kingshighway at the northeast corner of West Pine boulevard. Built in 1904 to accommodate World's Fair visitors, it was subsequently known as the Ambassador Hotel, which was gutted by fire in 1971 and razed in 1973.

== Architecture ==
The building was a U-shaped hotel, seven stories high, with bay windows around the wings. The hotel and annex originally offered 450 rooms, 300 of which had baths.

== History ==
Over the years, the hotel was popular with baseball players, commonly providing accommodation for visiting players and as a hang out for drinking and socialising. It was at the hotel's bar that the Major League Baseball career of Larry McLean ended during a drunken encounter with his manager, John McGraw. After the St. Louis Society of the Archaeological Institute of America was founded on February 8, 1906, the organizational meetings and many early lectures were held at the hotel. It also hosted meetings of the American Philological Association. In addition, it was a meeting place for other societies, conventions and demonstrations, from a Violinist's Guild's Convention in June 1912 to art galleries and weddings. On January 4, 1917, the notorious hotel master thief Ernest Le Ford was arrested at the Buckingham Hotel after successfully robbing over $50,000 (US$1,256,494 in 2025 dollars) worth of jewels from lavish hotels in New York City.

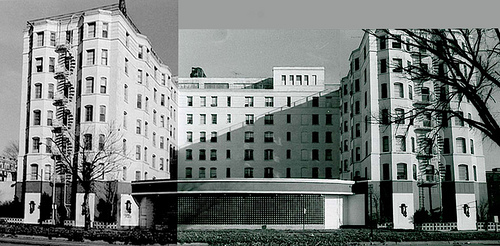
Renovated hotel building

It was common for guests to live permanently at the hotel, including the hotel's president, Walter James Holbrook. The capitalist Ellis Wainwright died in the hotel in 1924 after living there as a recluse. After 1920, the hotel faced stiff competition from the Chase Hotel, just a block north, and declined in significance. In December 1927, a fire in the hotel's annex led to the death of seven people. The Buckingham Realty Company, which operated the hotel, fell into bankruptcy in 1928, and it sealed the fate of the Buckingham Hotel; the intermingled accounts of the Buckingham Hotel Property and the Buckingham Annex constituted part of the problem.

Eventually acquired by the Royale Investment Company, the hotel was sold to attorney Morris Shenker in 1965. It was known as the Ambassador for many years until it was demolished in 1973, after a devastating fire two years earlier.
