= Pulitzer Arts Foundation =

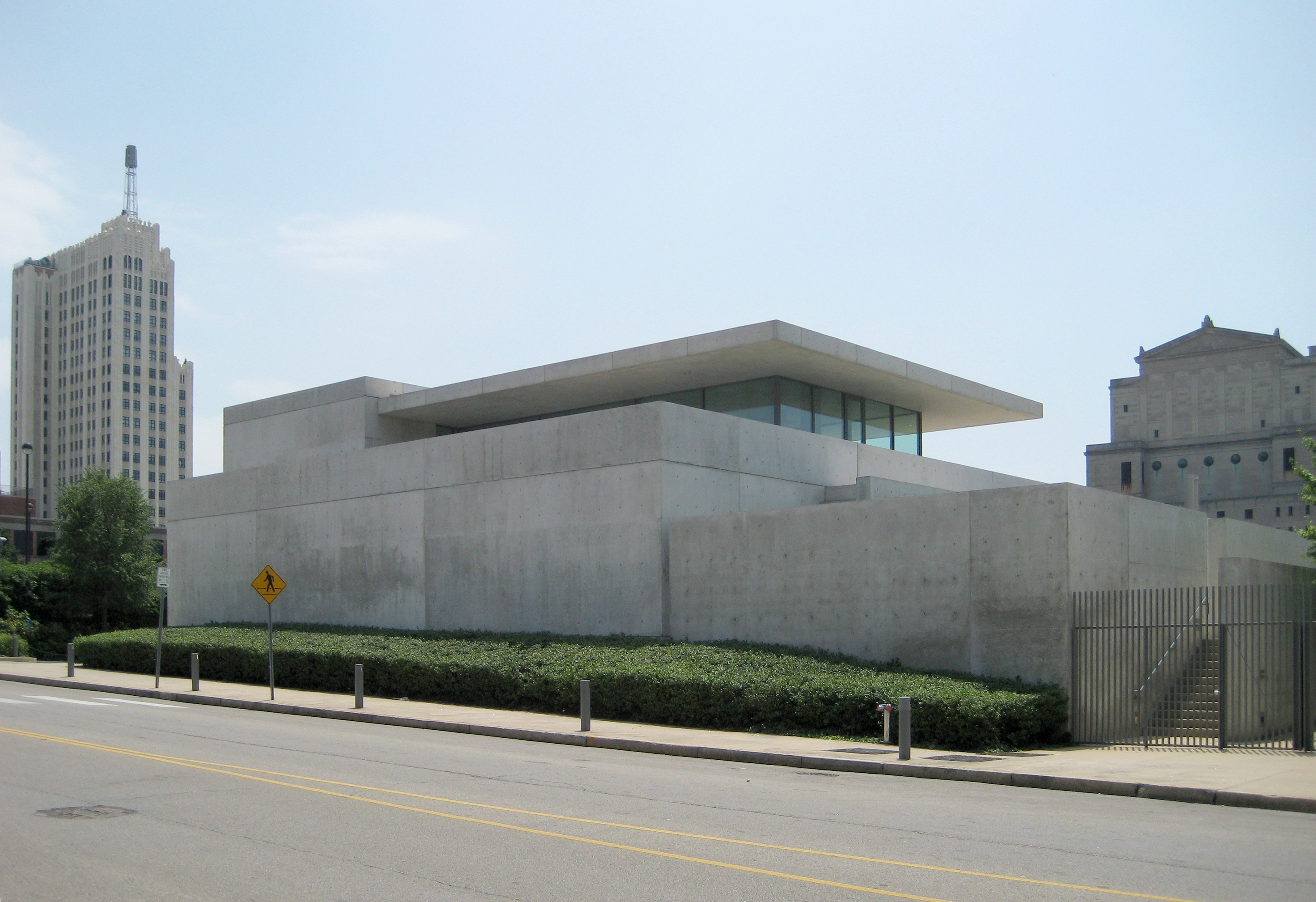
- The Pulitzer Arts Foundation building. To the left is the Continental Life Building
- Established: 2001
- Location: St. Louis, Missouri
- Coordinates: 38.6404°N 90.2344°W
- Type: Art museum
- Founder: Emily Rauh Pulitzer
- Director: Cara Starke
- Public transit access: MetroBus
- Website: https://www.pulitzerarts.org

Pulitzer Arts Foundation is an art museum in St. Louis, Missouri, that presents special exhibitions and public programs. Known informally as the Pulitzer, the museum is located at 3716 Washington Boulevard in the Grand Center Arts District. The building is designed by the internationally renowned Japanese architect Tadao Ando. Admission to the museum is free.

== History ==
The Pulitzer Arts Foundation was established in 2001 by Emily Rauh Pulitzer, who—together with her husband Joseph Pulitzer Jr.—had originally sought to create a space in which to install works from their private collection. The Pulitzers commissioned Tadao Ando in the early 1990s to renovate an abandoned automobile factory and showroom in midtown St. Louis, which had been an entertainment district known as Grand Center (now known as the Grand Center Arts District). During the design phase of the Pulitzer's gallery, Joseph Jr. died from colon cancer, and the project was not realized. Emily Rauh Pulitzer later approached Ando again, and she commissioned the architect's first freestanding public building in the United States.

The inaugural exhibition featured a selection of works from the Pulitzers’ private collections, including artwork by Roy Lichtenstein, Claude Monet, Pablo Picasso, Mark Rothko, Kiki Smith, and Andy Warhol. Beginning with the second exhibition, Selected Works by Ellsworth Kelly from St. Louis Collections, the Pulitzer extended the scope of its exhibitions to include works outside of the family's private collection, and this practice has driven nearly all subsequent exhibitions.

Operating under the name The Pulitzer Foundation for the Arts from 2001 to 2014, the Pulitzer has presented a variety of exhibitions including groups shows of minimalist art, Buddhist art, Old Masters, and contemporary themes, as well as solo exhibitions of Dan Flavin, Ann Hamilton, Gordon Matta-Clark, Richard Serra, Hiroshi Sugimoto, and others. Works at the Pulitzer are installed without the wall labels to encourage unmediated encounters with art.

== Building ==
Completed in October 2001 after four years of construction and nearly ten of planning, the Pulitzer Arts Foundation was the first public building in United States to be designed by architect Tadao Ando, who won the Pritzker Architecture Prize in 1995. The building is characterized by Ando's longstanding attention to natural elements such as light and water, as well as his signature use of concrete. The concrete forms that comprise the building were cast on site during a nearly four-year construction period using advanced techniques that were uncommon in America at the time. The building has been described as “both a serene setting for the contemplation of art and a contribution toward revitalizing the urban landscape of historic St. Louis.”

In June 2014 the building underwent an expansion project that would renovate storage and office spaces in the existing lower level to create two new public galleries. In consultation with Ando and his office, the Pulitzer increased the public space in the building from 6,800 square feet to roughly 10,400 square feet and reopened on May 1, 2015, with three concurrent solo exhibitions of artists Alexander Calder, Fred Sandback and Richard Tuttle.

== Exhibitions ==
Pulitzer Arts Foundation is a non-collecting museum that presents temporary art exhibitions, and has been called “one of the loveliest places in the country to look at art.” The inaugural exhibition in 2001 featured works curated exclusively from the Pulitzer private collection. Since then, the museum has presented art from a variety of time periods, disciplines, and collections. The art is often installed in ways that highlight or engage with the architecture of Tadao Ando, who has written that in the design of the Pulitzer, he sought “to create a very stimulating place, where works of art are not exhibited merely as specimens but can speak to us as living things.”

In addition to its curatorial staff and guest curators, the Pulitzer has a history of artist-curated exhibitions, including Blue Black (2017), curated by Glenn Ligon, who was inspired by his initial experience viewing Ellsworth Kelly’s site-specific sculpture of the same name. Kelly himself curated the exhibition Selected Works by Ellsworth Kelly from Saint Louis Collections (2002). Artist Gedi Sibony curated In the Still Epiphany (2012), and artist Ann Hamilton was commissioned by the Pulitzer to create a new work, stylus – a project by ann hamilton (2010–11), which activated the entire building and surrounding grounds.

Other notable exhibitions include art that has been under-recognized or rarely exhibited, such as nineteenth-century Japanese ukiyo-e drawings, the late-period multicolored works of Donald Judd, and the sculptures, photographs, and drawings of the Italian artist Medardo Rosso.

== Permanent Art on View ==
Three works of art are permanently on view at the Pulitzer. Ellsworth Kelly’s Blue Black is a twenty-eight-foot vertical wall sculpture beneath a skylight in the building’s main gallery. Richard Serra’s Joe is the first in the artist’s series of torqued spirals of Cor-Ten weathering steel, and is located in the courtyard to the west of the building. The works by Kelly and Serra were commissioned for the Pulitzer by Emily Rauh Pulitzer and were installed before the building opened. The Pulitzer later acquired a sculpture by artist Scott Burton, Rock Settee, which faces the building’s exterior reflecting pool.

Both Kelly and Serra collaborated with Mrs. Pulitzer and Tadao Ando on the installation of their works, of which Ando writes: “Into the spaces that I created with form, material, and light, Ellsworth Kelly and Richard Serra brought their own expression, conceiving a space for art that could exist only there.”

== Programs ==
The Pulitzer engages in a variety of public programs that directly relate to the exhibition on view or are aligned with ongoing community initiatives. These programs have included music, meditation, symposia, panel discussions, performances, poetry readings, as well as a variety of education-oriented projects and events. Additionally, the Pulitzer presents an ongoing collaborative chamber concert series of contemporary music with the Saint Louis Symphony Orchestra. Concert programs are chosen based on their relationship to the artworks exhibited. A similar collaboration with St. Louis-based music collective Farfetched has yielded a variety of live music performances.

In January 2014 the Pulitzer presented Reset, a week-long programming series that occurred during a period between exhibitions. Beginning with the installation of a site-specific, temporary floor and wall sculpture by artist David Scanavino, the programs included a variety of interactive and participatory events including a breakdancing competition, yoga, family activities, and a drag show. Reset also included a St. Louis Symphony Orchestra performance of the U.S. premiere of John Cage’s “Thirty Pieces for Five Orchestras,” a work which the Los Angeles Times referred to as “the most significant American orchestral work never played in America.”

The Pulitzer has organized the debut of a number of public performances through commissions and residencies, including new poetry by Claudia Rankine (2014) and a video poem by Rankine and filmmaker John Lucas (2016); a sound event by composer David Lang (2015); a residency and performance by interdisciplinary artist Chris Kallmyer (2015); and an iteration of artist Aram Han Sifuentes’s Protest Banner Lending Library (2018). In 2016 a gallery installation and series of public projects by the German architecture collective raumlaborberlin transplanted the building materials from a condemned two-story home on St. Louis's north side into the Pulitzer's main gallery.

== Community projects ==
The Pulitzer has a history of developing projects and programs aimed at engaging local communities and inviting participation from a wide variety of individuals and groups.

Working with Prison Performing Arts and the George Warren Brown School of Social Work at Washington University in St. Louis, the Pulitzer developed two iterations of Staging: a program that invited homeless veterans and formerly incarcerated individuals into the galleries over several weeks for a program that included theatrical training, employment counseling, and arts education, culminating in a public performance that invited audience members to see the artwork through their eyes and experiences.

In 2014, the Pulitzer launched PXSTL, a joint project with the Sam Fox School of Design & Visual Arts at Washington University in St. Louis. The first iteration of PXSTL, created by Freecell Architecture and titled Lots, transformed an empty lot across from the Pulitzer into a site for community activity and public access to the arts, including dance, music, photography, food, and meditation. The second iteration of PXSTL was a commission by artist-architects Amanda Williams and Andres L. Hernandez that resulted in a multiphase project evaluating the life cycle of a building.
