= Morris Shenker =

American lawyer

Morris A. Shenker (January 10, 1907 – August 8, 1989) was an American lawyer best known for his connections to labor leader Jimmy Hoffa and Teamster funding of Las Vegas in the 1960s.

== Biography ==
Shenker was a Russian Jewish immigrant, born in the town of Kalyus (in what is now Ukraine), who arrived in St. Louis in 1922 with limited English, after departing Europe from Antwerp and arriving at Quebec, Canada. Shenker traveled under the name of Morris Greenberg, accompanying Malka Greenberg and her daughters Bessie and Sarah. The actual Morris (son of Malka and brothers of Bessie and Sarah) was older. The party identified another Greenberg sister, Clara Greenberg Schenberg, as the family member they would be joining in the United States. Shenker was educated at Washington University School of Law, and set up law practice in 1932. Shenker built a reputation as a successful defense attorney, raised money for the Democratic Party and for Israel, and co-founded the Dismas House charity in St. Louis.

Shenker first came to national attention during the Kefauver Hearings in the early 1950s, in which he represented a number of underworld figures. From 1962 Shenker represented Jimmy Hoffa, and in 1966 became Hoffa's chief counsel. Shenker represented Teamster official Richard Kavner during the hearings of the McClellan Committee of the US Senate (1957-60). Although Kavner managed to avoid the committee for some time, proclaiming that he was "sick", he was eventually brought before the committee. Chief Counsel Bobby Kennedy pointed out that at the same time when Kavner was claiming to be "sick", he was “in Puerto Rico on Teamster business”. Shenker told the committee that “whenever [Kavner] is under emotional strain, he is subject to attacks which consist of a sudden loss of consciousness followed by severe sweating and pain".

In 1970 a year-long Life Magazine investigative report accused him, as head of the St. Louis Commission on Crime and Law Enforcement, along with the city's mayor Alfonso J. Cervantes, of both having "personal ties to the underworld." The magazine alleged that Shenker controlled the massive $700 million Teamsters Union Pension Fund and its investments, most notably in Las Vegas but also in San Diego (through developers Louis Lesser and Irvin Kahn), New York City, Kansas City, and elsewhere. Shenker himself assumed part ownership of the Dunes Hotel and Casino from the 1970s to 1985. Shenker tried to develop a casino in Atlantic City, New Jersey, also called the Dunes Hotel and Casino, but it was never completed.

During the 1970s, Shenker borrowed more than $200 million from the pension funds of labor unions that he influenced. He borrowed more than $160 million from the Teamsters pension fund, $43 million from the Culinary Workers pension fund, and $23.5 million from Pipefitters Local 562. In 1984, Shenker filed for bankruptcy after a $34 million court judgment against him by the Culinary Workers pension fund. In February 1989, Shenker was indicted by a grand jury, but was not tried because of his health.

On a local level, Shenker and Mayor Cervantes were part-owners of the mid-town St. Louis landmark Continental Life Building, along with businessman Harold Koplar, owner of independent television station KPLR-TV and Shenker's brother-in-law. Shenker's wife, Lillian Koplar Shenker, had also attended law school at Washington University in St. Louis, and became a judge in her own right in the St. Louis Court of Criminal Corrections.

Shenker died of pneumonia, at his daughter's house in Santa Monica, California, after a long illness. Fictionalized versions of Shenker appear in the 1961 film Hoodlum Priest (as "Louis Rosen", founder of a fictionalized Dismas House), and in the film Casino.
