= Captain 11's Showboat =

American children's television program

Captain 11's Showboat was a locally produced children's program, based in St. Louis, Missouri, airing on KPLR-TV, Channel 11 during the late-afternoon hours, starting in May 1959, and ending in August 1968.

Captain 11, named after the channel, was portrayed by former Broadway actor and longtime St. Louis radio personality Harry Fender. The Captain 11 character was reminiscent of Mark Twain. JoJo the Cook, who was played by Joe Cusanelli, was Captain 11's sidekick.

The show was 90 minutes long. The program was best known for airing Three Stooges shorts to viewers in the St. Louis area. Moe Howard, Joe DeRita, and Larry Fine made appearances on the show.
