= Robert A. Futterman =

American real estate investor and author (1928–1961)

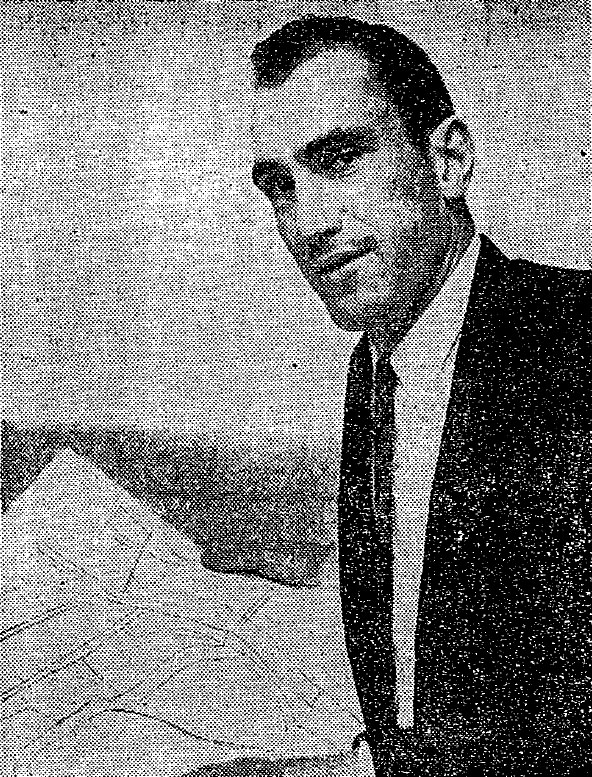
- Born: Robert Allen Futterman; April 6, 1928; Yonkers, New York, US
- Died: November 11, 1961 (aged 33)
- Education: University of Wisconsin
- Occupations: Real estate investor, developer, author

Robert Allen Futterman (1928–1961) was an American real estate investor, developer, author, and founder of the Futterman Corporation – a publicly traded New York-based real-estate holding and development company, which he built into a $100 million nationwide enterprise prior to his sudden death in November 1961 at age 33.

From headquarter offices located in the World Diamond Building (then Empire Trust Company Building) at 580 Fifth Avenue, Futterman operated and managed 43 properties in 23 cities, refining a real estate concept he called double diversification — balancing a real estate portfolio across both geographies and industries.

Futterman was a widely cited expert on urban renewal, having authored The Future of Our Cities, published in August 1961 by Doubleday & Co — with an introduction by architect Victor Gruen. The book gives a global survey metropolitan development and redevelopment and an analysis of 17 specific U.S. cities, with a "dramatic documentation of the economic dependence of major urban centers on defense contracts and military installations."

Kirkus Reviews described the book as an analysis of American urban problems and a critique of 19 large cities.

For the breadth of work within his brief professional career, the Akron Beacon Journal in June 2008 called Futterman a real estate "boy genius."

== Background ==
Futterman was born in Yonkers, New York to Russian immigrants and naturalized citizens Ida and Samuel Futterman, the latter a businessman and real estate investor. Futterman was raised Jewish and after attending public high school, he attended and graduated from the University of Wisconsin magna cum laude in 1948. He was known to have a near photographic memory.

After graduation, Futterman married fellow University of Wisconsin student, Rosalie Schreiber (July 27, 1928 – May 26, 2010), daughter of Adolph H. Schreiber; founder of A.H. Schreiber Company and Jewish philanthropist of Rockland County. The Futtermans lived in a house designed by Rosario Candela in Harrison, NY with their five children; Shari, Michael, Evan, Miryam and Joel.

Robert Futterman died in November 1961, at age 33, suffering a heart attack after choking on a piece of meat (reported variously as a sandwich) at a dinner party at the home of friends in New York. Rosalie Futterman Goodman died at age 81 in 2010. Futterman's brother, Philip G. Futterman (1934–), became a noted New York retail specialist.

Robert A. Futterman is not related to Robert K. Futterman, Chairman & CEO of Robert K. Futterman & Associates, a New York-based real estate investment company which holds no business interest in the now defunct Futterman Corporation.

== Professional career ==
Give me a topographical map of any major city, the rivers, the railroads, the elevations. Tell me when it was started and what for – the type of industry it has. I'd be willing to bet I can tell you where the industries, the big retail establishments, the City Hall, the prosperous business districts are.
– Robert A. Futterman, 1960, The Future of Our Cities

After graduating from the University of Wisconsin, Futterman worked in numerous fields, including in an advertising agency, as a salesman for a dress pattern company, and as a trainee in a manufacturing and distribution concern.

His real estate career began in 1952 with a New York law firm, where he assisted in managing client properties, beginning with rent collection in several buildings razed for the Lincoln Square Project. In 1955, after going to work as a rent collector, he worked as a supervising agent for several major office buildings in New York and Philadelphia operated by the Margolin Realty Management Corporation. Futterman, along with principals from Margolin, took part in buying a midtown office building. In 1955 when he left Margolin, Futterman's had tripled his initial investment.

He subsequently he began purchasing office buildings with his own associates, forming the Futterman Corporation in 1959. Futterman would initiate a real estate deal by parameters of a city where he was considering a property, rather than focusing on a possible rate of return, saying to "never buy arithmetic, always buy basics," such factors as viewing "a city as a socioeconomic organism, with its industries, municipal policies, citizens' views of their civic duties, and the means of getting in and out of town."

Until a few years ago, the word "planning" sent shivers down the backbones of the largest part of our citizenry. Only slowly are we waking up to the fact that planning the conservation of our natural resources and human resources is fundamentally no different that creating a legal system to create orderly relations in our society.
– Robert A. Futterman, 1960, The Future of Our Cities

In 1960 in downtown Akron, Ohio, Futterman recommended closing side streets to create pedestrian malls, the strategic placement of a 20-story office tower, and the city's first ever pedestrian bridge or "sky-walk." The sky-walk opened in June 1960, spawning a system of pedestrian bridges, siphoning pedestrian traffic from the lower streets, and contributing ultimately to the decay of the city's downtown.

His project in Norfolk, Virginia, The Golden Triangle Motor Hotel (aka Golden Triangle Center) received the 1960 National Municipal League Award.

After his death, the Futterman Corporation became a division of Titan Industries (1966), which in turn became the Titan Group (1967), which in turn became Hannover Companies Incorporated (1985).

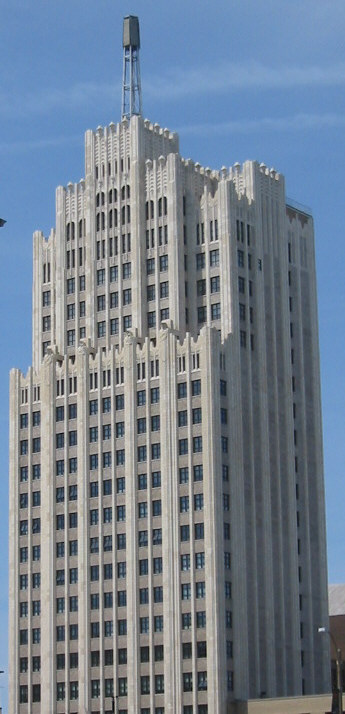
Continental Life Building, St. Louis

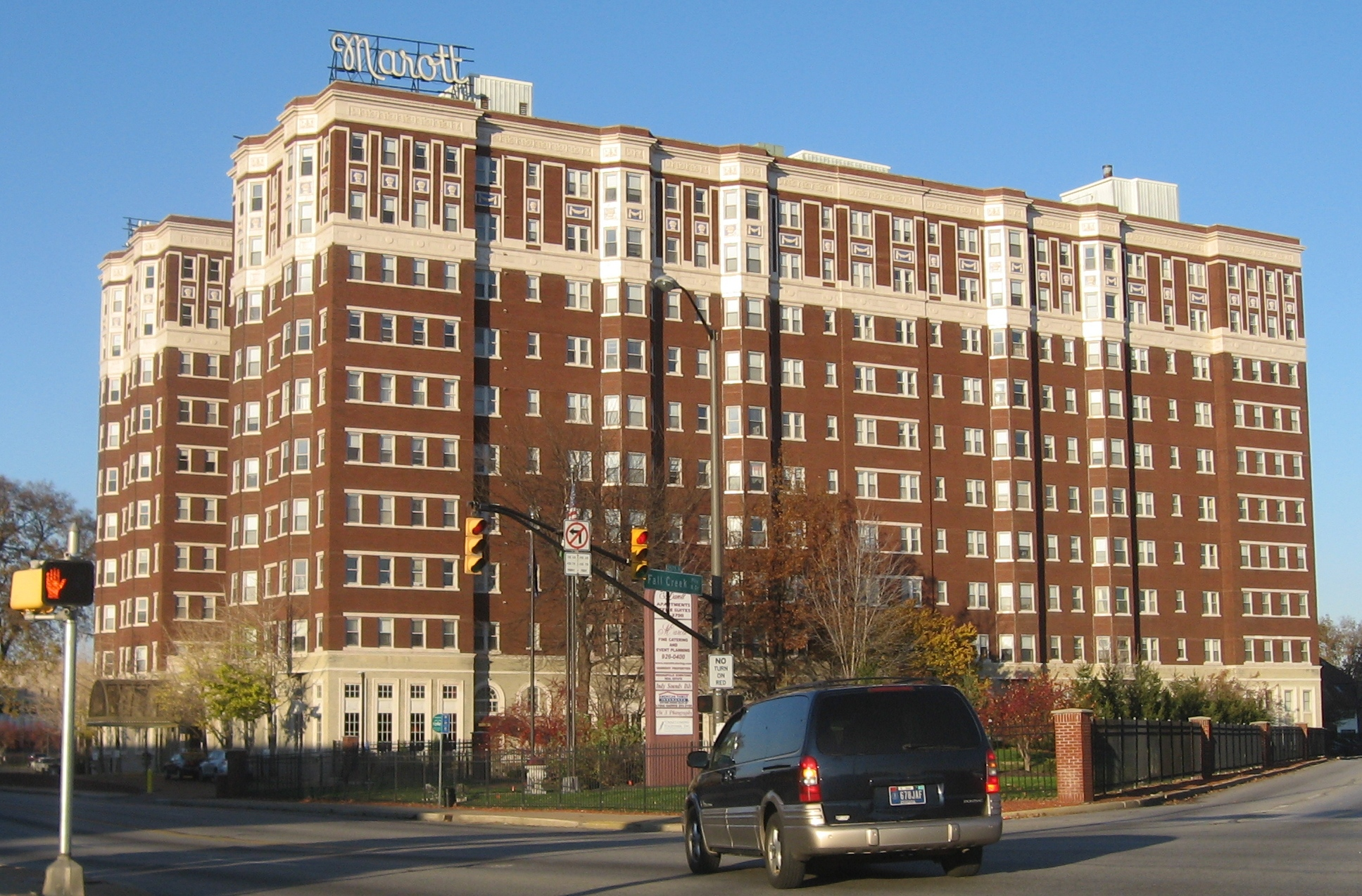
Marott Hotel, Indianapolis

=== Projects ===
- Continental Life Building, St. Louis, MO: Futterman purchased the Continental Building with partner Jerry Terney, for $2 million, at age 27.
- Golden Triangle Motor Hotel, Norfolk, VA: Futterman worked with Washington DC developer Herbert Glassman to develop the downtown Norfolk project, which began construction in 1959.
- Dupont Plaza Hotel, Dupont Circle, Washington D.C.
- Grosvenor House, Seattle, WA
- Glassmanor Apartments: Glassmanor, MD
- Marott Hotel: Indianapolis, IN
- Riverside Manor Motel: Lansing, MI
- Arva Hotel, Arlington, VA
