= Harold Koplar =

Russian-American hotelier and businessman

- Born: February 27, 1915; St. Louis, Missouri
- Died: May 3, 1985 (aged 70)
- Resting place: New Mount Sinai Cemetery; Affton, Missouri; 38.554868°N 90.304865°W
- Spouse: Marie Koplar
- Children: 3

Harold Koplar (February 27, 1915 – May 3, 1985) was an American hotelier and businessman in St. Louis, Missouri.

== Biography ==
=== Early life and education ===
Harold Koplar was born February 27, 1915. His grandfather, Berl Koplar an iron dealer, came from Russia in 1883 at the age of 22. His father, Sam Koplar, built the Park Plaza Hotel in 1929. Harold Koplar was raised in St. Louis, Missouri, graduating from Soldan High School before going on to the University of Illinois at Urbana-Champaign, where he studied architecture and engineering but left without graduating.

=== Career ===
Koplar linked together and managed the Chase Park Plaza Hotel in St. Louis, Missouri. In 1959, he launched the television station KPLR-TV (the call letters came from his last name) in a converted apartment building near the hotel. He established a development at Lake of the Ozarks in 1964 that includes the Lodge of Four Seasons hotel, two golf courses, a marina, and Spa Shiki. In 1966 he was listed as part-owner of the troubled midtown landmark Continental Life Building, along with St. Louis mayor Alfonso J. Cervantes and nationally known defense attorney Morris Shenker, who was also Koplar's brother-in-law.

=== Marriage and children ===
Harold and Marie Lauer Koplar married on March 30, 1931. The couple had three children: Robert "Bob" Koplar (d. 1977), Edward J. "Ted" Koplar (d. 2021), and Susan Koplar Brown.

=== Death and afterward ===
On May 3, 1985, Harold Koplar was found unconscious in an indoor lap pool in his home. He was rushed to the hospital and declared dead of a massive heart attack. Funeral services were held at Temple Emanuel in St. Louis and he was interred in the Koplar family mausoleum at New Mount Sinai Cemetery, Affton, Missouri.
