= Aram Han Sifuentes =

Korean American artist

- Born: 1986; Seoul, South Korea
- Known for: fiber art
- Website: aramhansifuentes.com

Aram Han Sifuentes (born 1986 Seoul, South Korea) is a Korean American social practice fiber artist, writer, curator, and an adjunct professor at the School of the Art Institute of Chicago.

== Life and career ==
Sifuentes was born in Seoul, South Korea, and immigrated to Modesto, California, in 1992. Sifuentes attended the University of California, Berkeley, the Maryland Institute College of Art and the School of the Art Institute of Chicago.

Sifuentes's work has been displayed in various national and international exhibitions. She was the 2013 Windgate Museum Intern at the Smithsonian's Archive of American Art, and is independently curating an AAA oral history collection on craft. Sifuentes was also a 2012-2013 Curatorial Fellow at the School of the Art Institute of Chicago.

Sifuentes's solo exhibitions include the 2015 A Mend: A Collection of Scraps, shown at Babson College in Massachusetts. In it, Sifuentes represents the labor-entailing jobs that are common for immigrants by collecting scraps of jeans from Chicago seamstresses and tailors and sewing them together. Her other exhibitions include U.S. Citizenship Test Sampler, through which Sifuentes addresses the sociohistoric role of women and the function of noncitizen communities. Hand-sewn into the piece are the 100 civic study questions and answers of the US Naturalization Test.

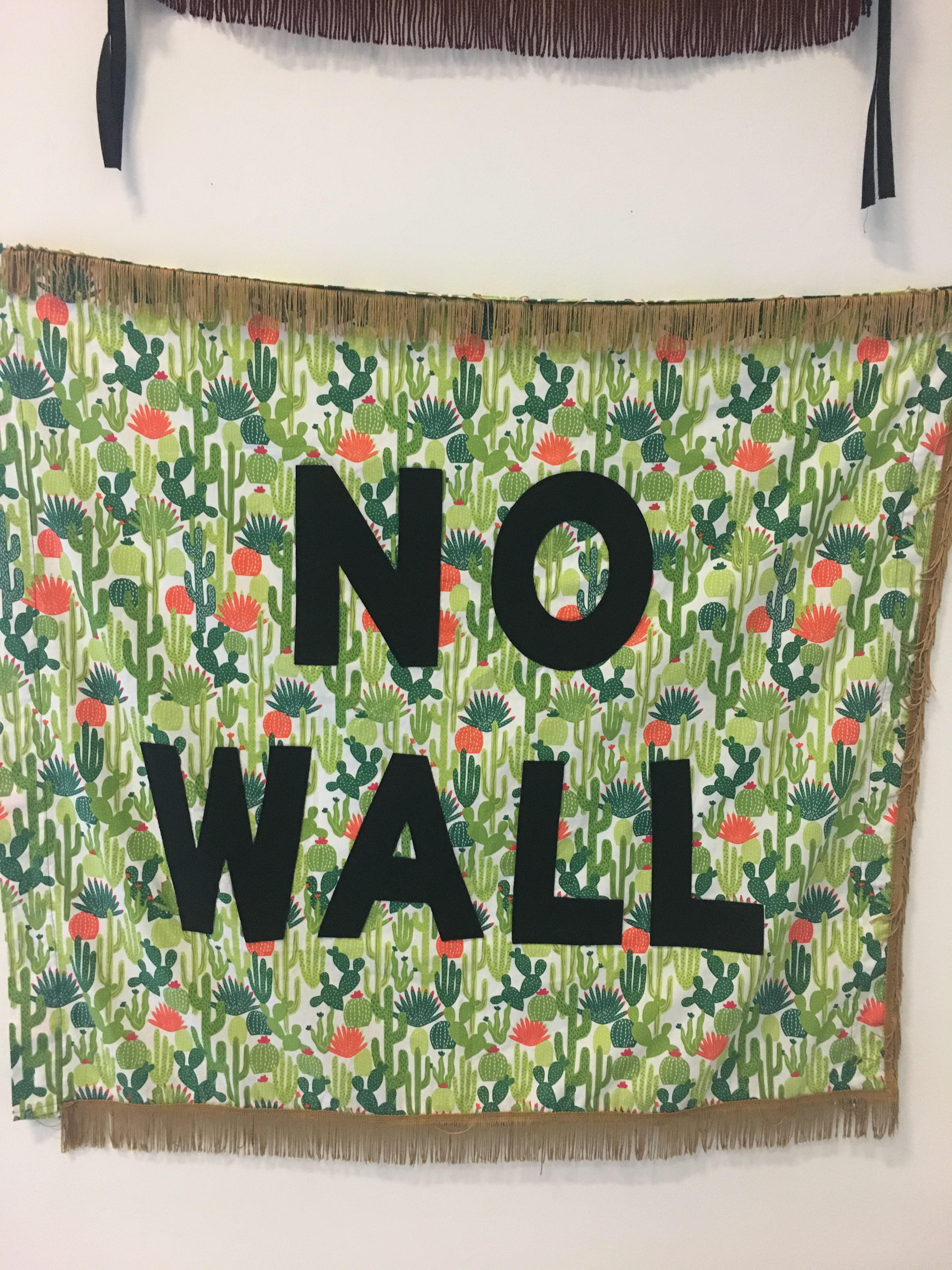
Protest Banner exhibited during a Protest Banner Lending Library workshop at the Asian Arts Initiative in 2018.

OTRO MUNDO ES POSIBLE (2017) at the Renwick Gallery in Washington, DC in 2022

Her work, OTRO MUNDO ES POSIBLE, was acquired by the Smithsonian American Art Museum as part of the Renwick Gallery's 50th Anniversary Campaign.

=== Protest Banner Lending Library ===
Sifuentes's Protest Banner Lending Library project was conceived following the 2016 presidential election. Sifuentes was unable to attend protests because she had a small child; she also felt she would be unsafe at such events because she was not then a US citizen. The library is a space where folks can make banners, but also borrow a banner to be used in protest and then be returned. The project has taken place at the Jane Addams Hull-House Museum in partnership with Gallery 400, Smart Museum, Comfort Station, Chicago Cultural Center, School of the Art Institute of Chicago, the Art Institute of Chicago, the Handwerker Gallery at Ithaca College, the Johnson Museum of Art, and at the Whitney Museum — where she worked with Cauleen Smith as part of the 2017 Whitney Biennial's programming.

== Awards ==
2016 - Smithsonian Artist Research Fellowship, Smithsonian Institution, Washington D.C.

2017 - Beazley Designs of the Year exhibition at the Design Museum, London

2018 - Pulitzer Arts Foundation residency, St. Louis
