= Leon Bronstein =

Israeli sculptor

Leon Bronstein לאון ברונשטין
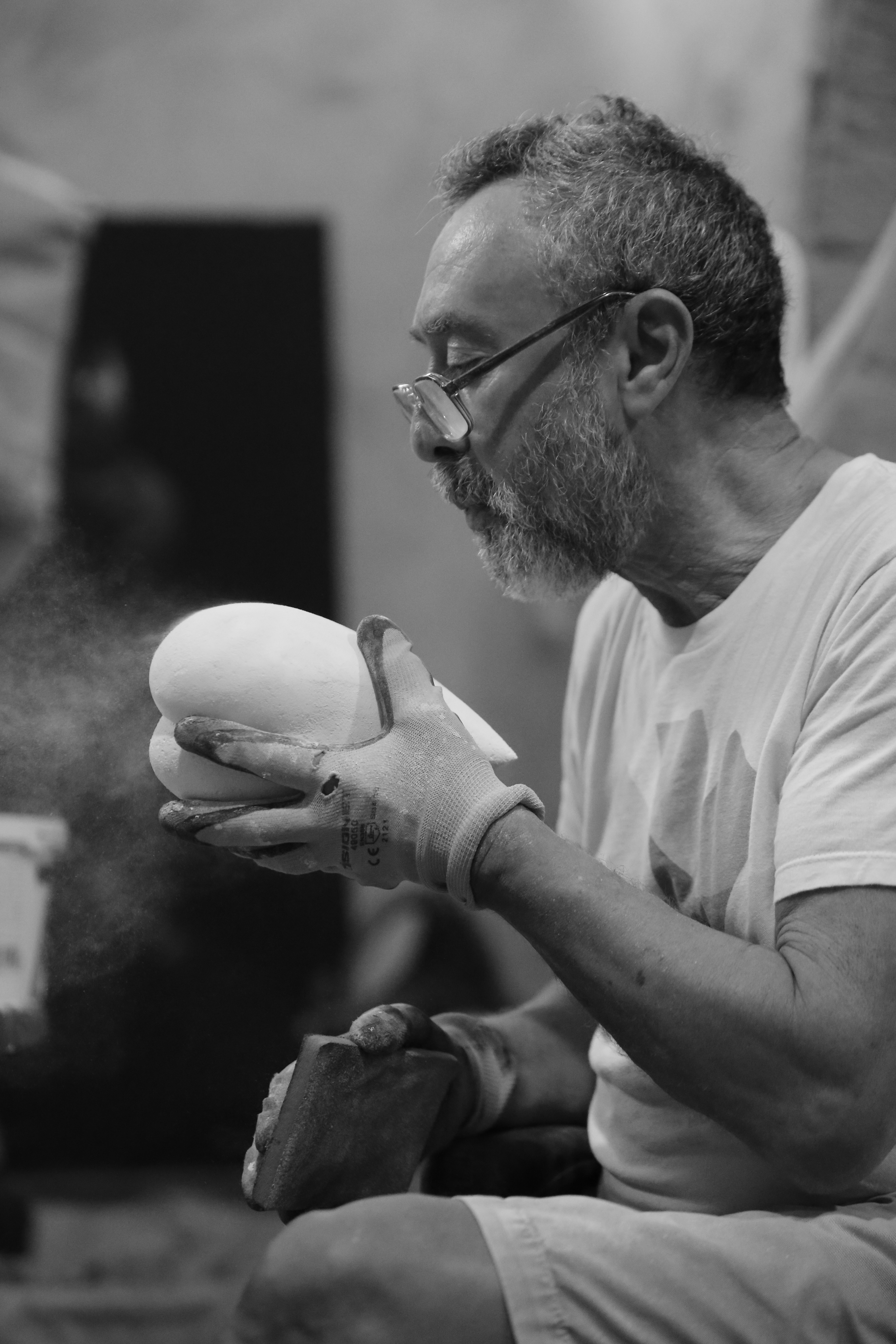
- Born: Leon Bronstein; July 20, 1951 (age 74); Tiraspol, Moldova

Leon Bronstein (Hebrew: לאון ברונשטין; born July 20, 1951) is an Israeli sculptor.

== Early life, family and education ==
Bronstein was born in Tiraspol, Moldova, part of the USSR at the time. He graduated from the Tiraspol Technicum (College) after completing his studies in the field of Engineering.

During his last years in USSR, he worked as a watchmaker.

In 1979, Bronstein “made aliyah” (emigrated) with his family to Israel, first residing in Or Akiva where he studied Hebrew in the Ulpan.

== Career ==
Bronstein specializes in the semi-abstract style of art, using bronze as his preferred medium.

Initially, he started his sculpting career using wood as a medium. He worked with olive wood for several years. He began working in the sculpting department of “Touch Wood," a former factory manufacturing hand-made sculptures and memorabilia for tourists. After the factory closed he began his independent career as a sculptor. Bronstein’s first art exhibit took place in 1985 in New York’s Art Expo. He presented his work there, among other artists such as Alex Katz. After his first exhibition, he received an offer to be part of the permanent exhibition at the Emil Leonard Gallery in Soho, New York, US.

In 1985, Bronstein began to use bronze exclusively, with his first sculptures being presented in the E.S. Lawrence Gallery in Aspen, Colorado, and Los Angeles, US. In 1992, Bronstein was invited by the Minister of Culture of the USSR to exhibit his work in the International Russian Culture Foundation in Moscow, Soviet Union.

In 2001, his sculpture “To the Sky” was installed in the entrance to Terminal 1 at Ben-Gurion International Airport in Israel. An additional sculpture cast of “To the Sky” is located in the headquarters of Larson-Juhl Corporation in Atlanta, Georgia, US. In 2002, he exhibited at the Triton Museum of Art in Santa Clara, California, US. In 2004, the sculpture “Caring Hands” was installed in the Saint Louis Public Health Centre. In 2012, he participated in “Muse”, an outdoor sculptures exhibit, in Mamilla Avenue, Jerusalem.

In 2016, his sculpture “Exercises” was installed in the entrance to Ein Hod, an artist’s village in Israel. A twin statue of “Exercises” is located at Northland College, Wisconsin. In 2018, the sculpture “Starry Starry Night” was installed in the Denver Botanic Gardens, Colorado, US.

In 2020, an exhibition of Bronstein’s work took place at SLUMA, Saint Louis University Museum of Art, Missouri, US. His sculpture “Sharing the Same Thoughts” was installed at the entrance to the museum. This exhibition is currently presented at the Caitlyn Gallery in Saint Louis, Missouri.

== Personal life ==
Bronstein resides and works in the artist’s village of Ein Hod in Israel. He and his wife Berta (Betty) have three children.
