= Harry Fender =

American entertainer (1896–1995)

Clarence "Harry" Fender (1896–1995) was an entertainer and detective who performed in Florenz Ziegfeld shows such as Kid Boots and later hosted the St. Louis children's television program Captain 11's Showboat.

== Early career ==
Born in St. Louis, Missouri, Fender performed in St. Louis opera companies in his teens. He was a tenor.

He served in the Navy during World War I in an entertainment unit. He performed on Broadway as an actor and a dancer on the J.J. Shubert theatre circuit. His performance in the musical Follow the Girl at the Roof Theatre in New York was reviewed by Billboard: "Harry Fender sang with pleasing effect, altho [sic] some of his notes in the lower register were too much restrained".

Billboard reviewed his performance in the 1922 musical The Lady in Ermine at the Ambassador Theatre: "Harry Fender was sincere at all times and sang each of his numbers excellently".

In a review for the 1923 musical Adrienne at the George M. Cohan Theatre, Billboard wrote that while Fender was "not much of an actor" he had "a delightful singing voice".

Fender often ran out on shows; he was wanted to be the original male lead in Show Boat before he dropped out. Ziegfeld wrote to him that the role of Gaylord Ravenal in Show Boat would be "the opportunity of your life". Fender later said he left show business because the pressure was too much. One news story reports that he had suffered from hypochondria. Musical historian Miles Kreuger writes that Fender had developed a fear of performing on stage.

His last show before his return to St. Louis was Palm Beach Girl at the restaurant-theatre in Palm Beach (previously the Montmartre and later the Ziegfeld).

== Personal life ==
In 1927, it was announced that he was engaged to Gertrude Sandford of New York. Their engagement reportedly ended when he was worried he would be thought to be marrying her for her money. One 1928 article noted, "Fender has been devoted to Mary Brown Warburton, daughter of Major Barclay Warburton, and granddaughter of the late John Wanamaker".

== Return to St. Louis ==
He then returned to his hometown of St. Louis, where his mother, an actress, had a drama school. Fender became a policeman in 1932 and eventually a detective. He served as a detective in the anti-gambling squad and worked against the numbers racket. He left law enforcement in 1945, joining KXOK as a news commentator on the radio. His show aired from 1954-1975, six nights per week, from the Chase Park Plaza.

Fender was a semi-regular on Jack Carney's radio program on KMOX radio and he occasionally hosted the big band remote program Saturday at the Chase; he worked for the station from 1948-1969.

He was known as the host of the children's program Captain 11's Showboat.

In 1970, he was reportedly working on his memoirs, which were to be titled I Left Broadway to Be a Cop.

Fender recorded introductions for the St. Louis Muny into his nineties. He died in 1995 at the age of 98 in Clayton, Missouri. He was buried at Calvary Cemetery in St. Louis.

== Broadway appearances ==
- Follow the Girl as Alfred Vanderveer (March 2, 1918 – March 23, 1918
- Shubert Gaieties of 1919 (July 17, 1919 – October 18, 1919)
- Florodora as Captain Arthur Donegal (April 5, 1920 – August 14, 1920)
- The Last Waltz as Baron Ippolith (May 10, 1921 – October 29, 1921)
- Adrienne as Stephen Hayes (May 28, 1923 – December 15, 1923)
- Kid Boots as Tom Sterling (December 31, 1923 – February 21, 1925)
- Louie the 14th as Captain William Brent, A. E. F (March 3, 1925 – December 5, 1925)

== Papers ==
Fender's papers were donated to the St. Louis Public Library.
