= Continental Life Building =

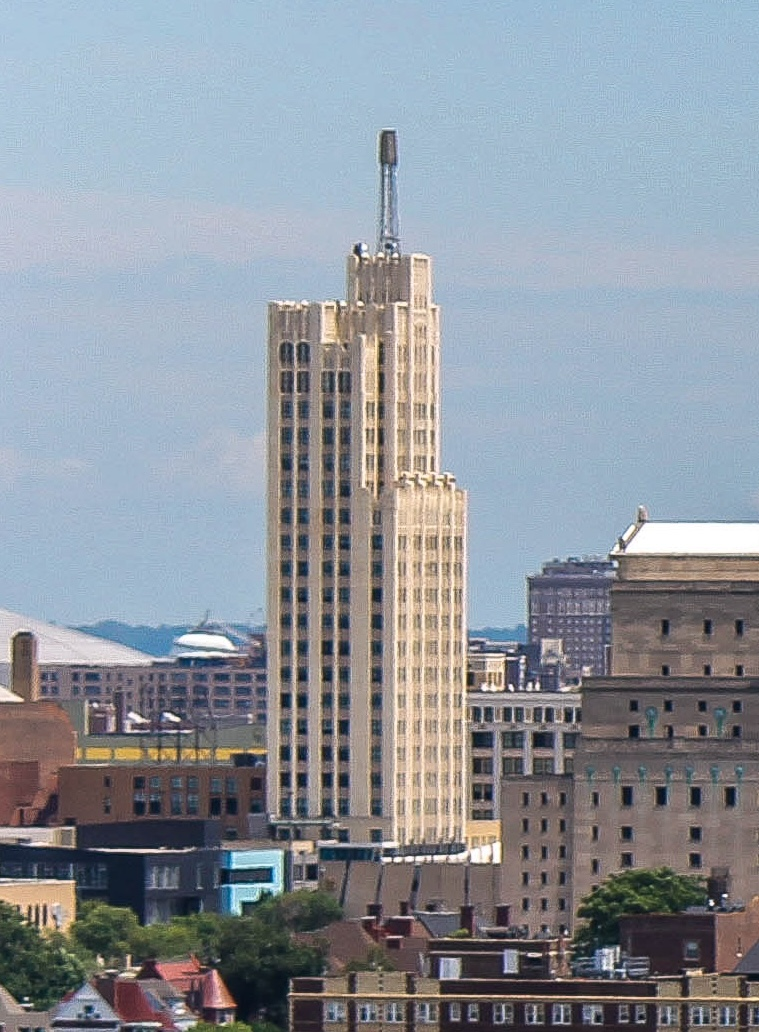
- The building seen in 2013
- Interactive map of the Continental Life Building area

General information
- Status: Completed
- Type: Apartments
- Location: 3615 Olive St., St. Louis, Missouri
- Coordinates: 38°38′19″N 90°13′58″W
- Completed: 1930; 96 years ago
- Owner: Owen Development

Height
- Roof: 286 feet (87 m)

Technical details
- Floor count: 22
- Lifts/elevators: 2

Design and construction
- Architect: William B. Ittner

Other information
- Public transit access: MetroBus

The Continental Life Building, also known as the Continental Building, is an Art Deco skyscraper in St. Louis, Missouri, United States, which was completed in 1930. The building is located in Grand Center near St. Louis' Midtown neighborhood, and is visible from vantage points around the city.

== History ==
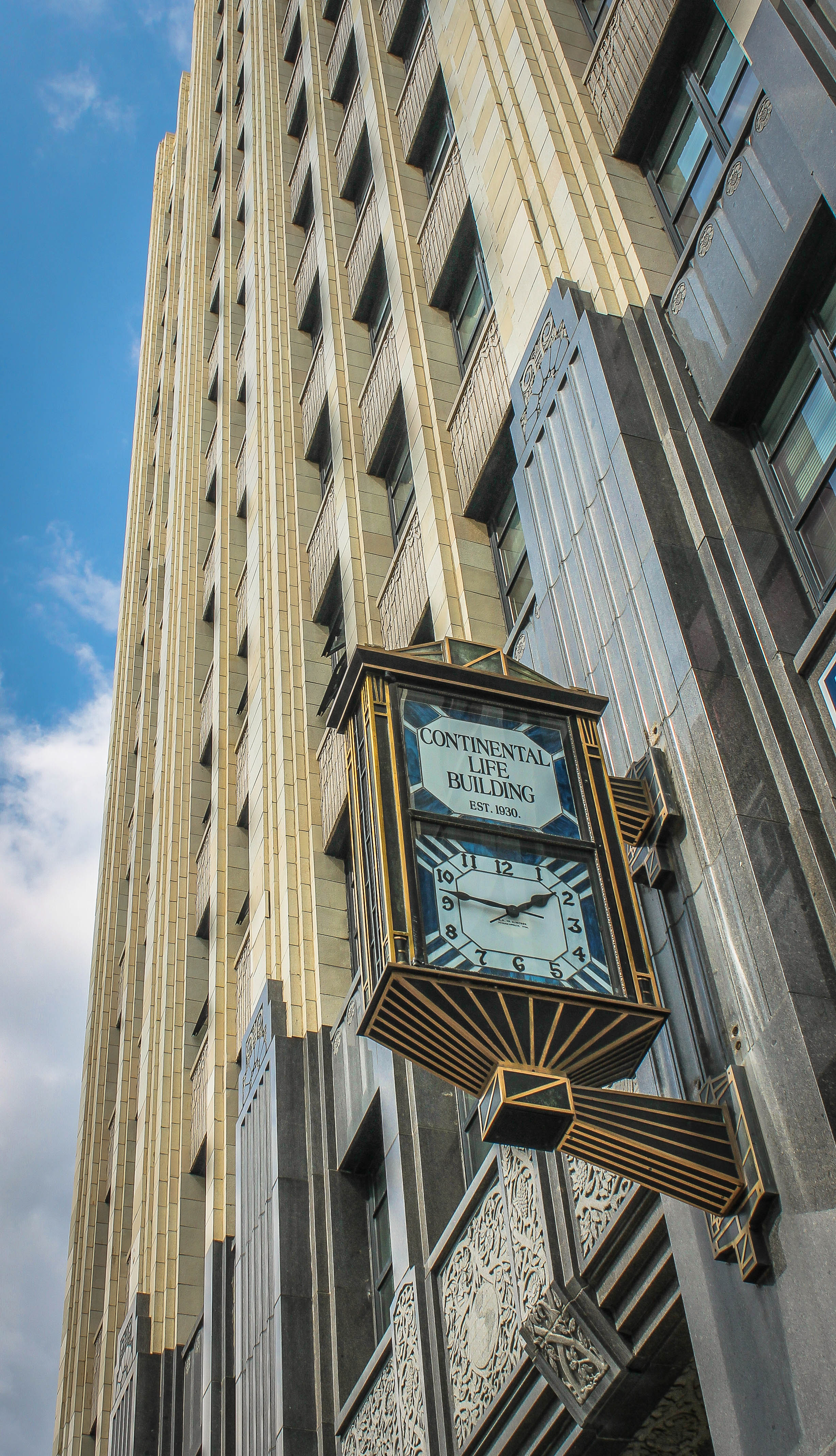
The restored clock seen in 2013

Commissioned by Edmund Monroe "Ed" Mays to be the home of his two businesses, Continental-Life Insurance and the Grand National Bank, the building was designed by William B. Ittner, a prominent St. Louis architect.

On September 22, 1955, the building was purchased for $2 million by then 27-year-old developers Robert A. Futterman and Jerry Tenney. When Futterman died suddenly in 1961, choking on a sandwich at a dinner party at age 33, his death propelled the building into near insolvency. In his 2003 book The Queen of Lace, The Story of the Continental Life Building, developer and author Stephen Trampe called it "the sandwich that started the decline."

The tower housed businesses through the mid-1960s when its co-owners included St. Louis mayor Alfonso J. Cervantes, prominent St. Louis defense attorney Morris Shenker, and Harold Koplar of KPLR-TV. The final tenants vacated the building in 1973. A water pipe burst in 1974 causing water damage to the lower levels. Despite the building no longer being used at the time, most of the utilities remained on until they were shut off in 1979. The structure then fell into more disrepair.

After a few false starts in the late 1990s, St. Louis developers Stephen Trampe and Mike Barry took on the project, renovating the building into apartments. It reopened in 2001. Trampe later wrote a book about the building's history and rebirth.

The building has a connected three-story parking garage, which is used by both residents and patrons of the nearby Fox Theatre. The top of the parking garage holds an outdoor pool for residents' use.

A notable number of St. Louis landmarks are visible from the building because of its location and height. Some of these include the Gateway Arch, One Metropolitan Square (St. Louis' tallest building), the Edward Jones Dome, the City Museum, the Civil Courts Building, the Anheuser Busch brewery, portions of the Missouri Botanical Garden including the Climatron geodesic dome, the St. Louis State Hospital, the Compton Hill water tower, the campus of St. Louis University and the St. Louis Science Center.

Architectural elements from the building were collected over time by the National Building Arts Center and returned to the building in the Stephen Trampe renovation. Other elements still reside at the foundation's storage site in Sauget, Illinois.

According to the Ghostbusters DVD commentary, Dana's apartment building is modeled after the top of the Continental Life Building in St. Louis, MO. Dana's apartment building actually exists at 55 Central Park West in New York City. The building is only 20 stories high. For the film, matte paintings and models were used to make the building look bigger with more floors and modeling the top of the Continental Life Building.
