= Chase Park Plaza Hotel =

Building in Missouri, United States

The Royal Sonesta Chase Park Plaza St. Louis
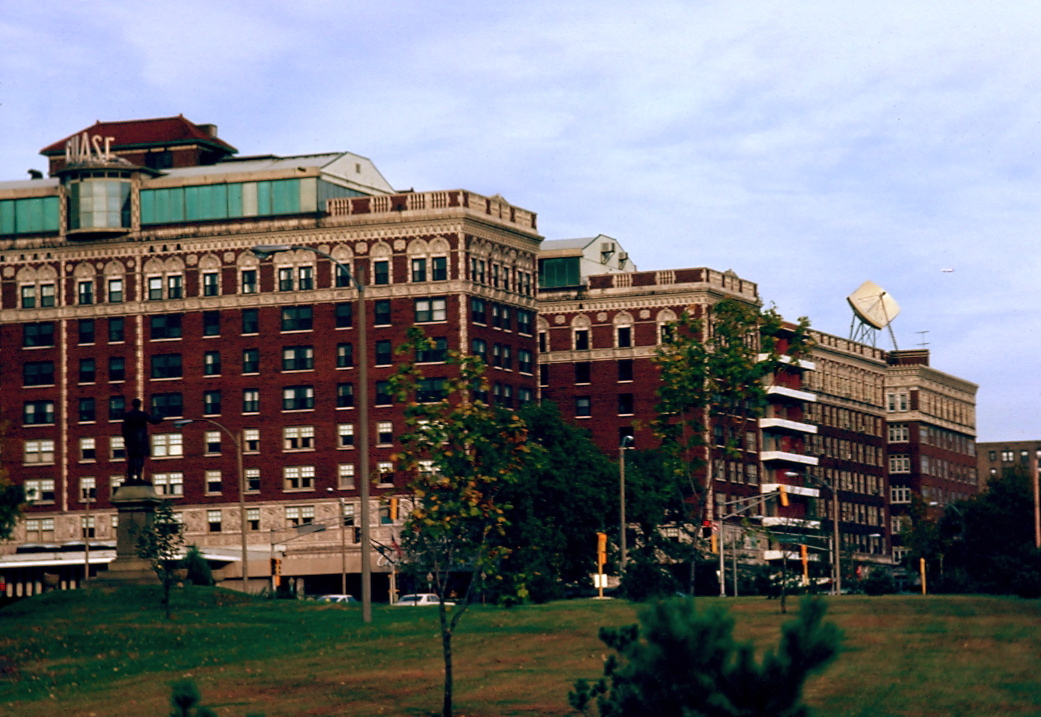
- The original Chase wing

- Location of Chase Park Plaza Hotel in St. Louis Chase Park Plaza Hotel (the United States)

General information
- Location: St. Louis, Missouri, U.S., 212 North Kingshighway Boulevard, St. Louis, Missouri
- Coordinates: 38°38′39″N 90°15′50″W
- Opening: September 29, 1922; 103 years ago
- Owner: Hospitality Properties Trust
- Operator: Sonesta Hotels

Technical details
- Floor count: 28

Design and construction
- Architect: Preston J. Bradshaw

Other information
- Public transit: MetroBus

The Royal Sonesta Chase Park Plaza St. Louis is a historic hotel and apartment complex located at 212 N. Kingshighway Boulevard in the Central West End of St. Louis, Missouri. It consists of two buildings - the Chase Hotel, built in 1922 by developer Chase Ullman, and the Art Deco-style Park Plaza tower, built in 1929 and today housing condominiums. The complex also features a cinema and several restaurants and bars.

== History ==
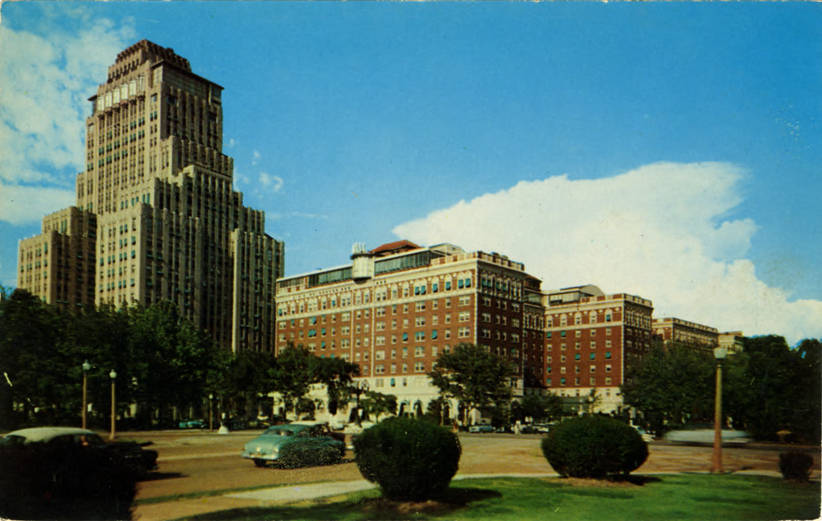
Park Plaza and Chase Hotels, 1950s

The Chase Hotel opened on September 29, 1922. It supplanted the nearby Buckingham Hotel as the most luxurious hotel in the city. The ground-floor Chase Club was a popular venue for nationally known entertainers from its opening in 1933 until it closed in 1972.

The Park Plaza Hotel opened next door in 1929, as a rival. The Park Plaza's original owner, Sam Koplar, lost the hotel to foreclosure during the Great Depression and ended up taking a job next door as manager of the Chase. Through the help of a rabbi friend, Koplar raised funds and rebought the Park Plaza from the insurance company in 1944. Koplar became the Chase's majority owner in 1946.

In 1961, the Koplars merged the two hotels into The Chase-Park Plaza. The Koplar family sold the hotel to a group of investors called Chase Hotel Redevelopment Corporation in 1981. They defaulted on their loan and the 1700-room hotel was seized by their lender, GE Capital, in 1983. GE closed the hotel rooms in the Park Plaza tower in 1985 and converted it at a cost of $12 million to an apartment building, which opened in 1988. In 1989, with business declining, GE closed the hotel in the remaining Chase wing and auctioned off the building's contents in 1991.

The Chase wing sat vacant for nearly a decade, until the property was sold to developer Jim Smith in 1997. He renovated the hotel at a cost of $125 million and reopened it in 1999 as The Chase Park Plaza, dropping the hyphen from the name. In 2006, the property was sold to Behringer Harvard for $180 million. In June 2017, the hotel was sold to Boston-based Hospitality Properties Trust for $94 million, $60 million of which was used to pay off the hotel's debts. The new owners had already contracted with Sonesta Hotels to manage the property, which was renamed The Royal Sonesta Chase Park Plaza St. Louis on May 18, 2017. The Chase Park Plaza is part of the National Trust for Historic Preservation's Historic Hotels of America program.

=== Jackie Robinson and desegregation ===
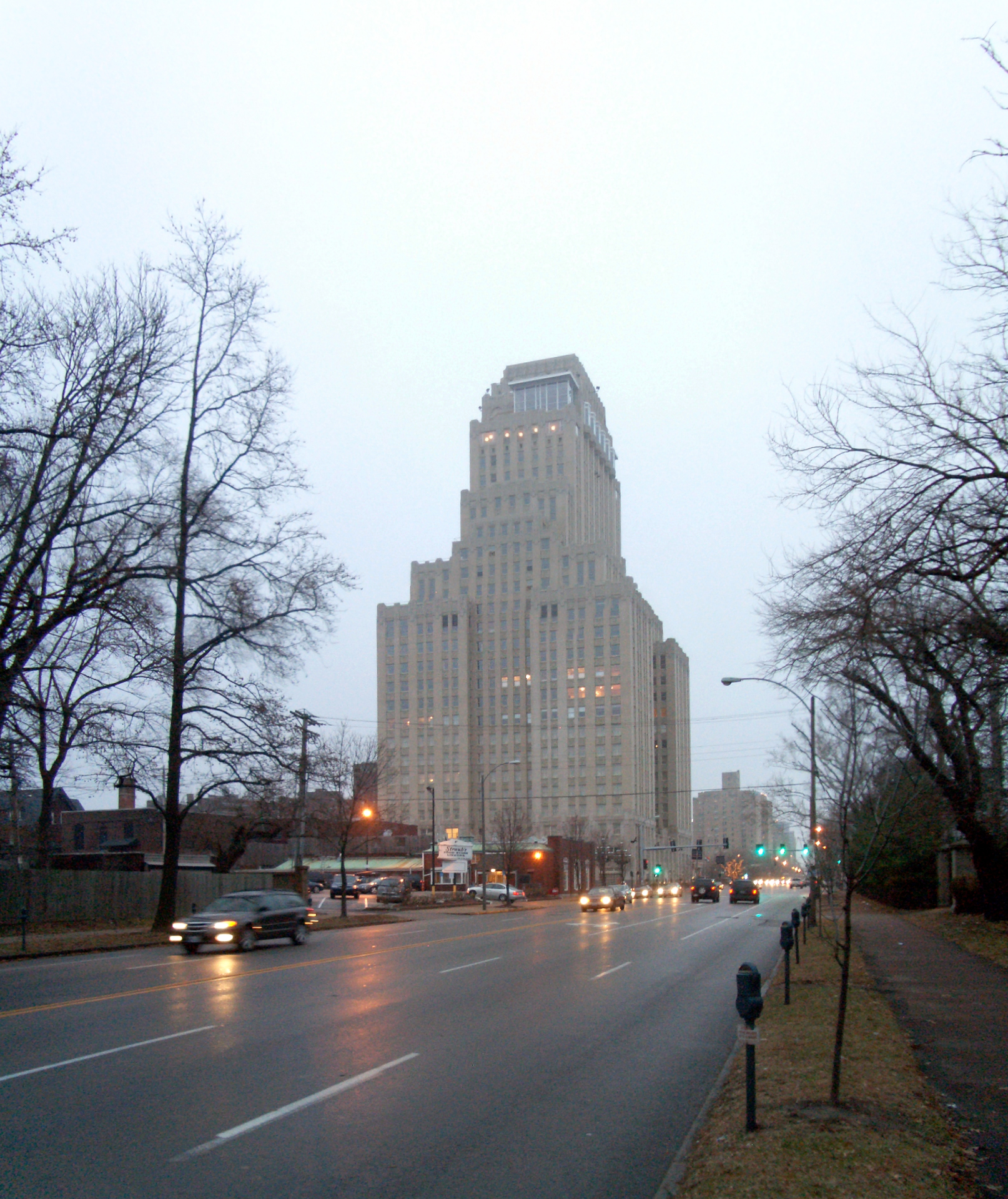
View of the Park Plaza tower wing from north on Kingshighway Boulevard

Jackie Robinson was a Major League Baseball (MLB) second baseman who became the first African American to play in the major leagues in the modern era. Robinson broke the baseball color line when the Brooklyn Dodgers started him at first base on April 15, 1947.

In 1953, Robinson openly criticized segregated hotels and restaurants that served the Dodger organization. A number of these establishments integrated as a result, including the Chase Hotel.

=== Wrestling at the Chase ===
The Chase was also famous for hosting a wrestling program called Wrestling at the Chase (1959–1983), produced and televised by KPLR-TV channel 11, whose operations were in the hotel and the adjoining Park Plaza apartments, all owned by Harold Koplar, Sam Koplar's son. Many famous wrestlers, including St. Louis native Lou Thesz and Buddy Rogers, wrestled on the program.

== See also ==
- Veiled Prophet Parade and Ball#After coronation
