= Prison Performing Arts =

Prison Performing Arts is a literacy and performing arts program aimed at adults and children incarcerated in Missouri jails and prisons.

Prison Performing Arts was featured on a dedicated episode of NPR's This American Life where they followed men incarcerated in prison in Pacific, Missouri as they performed Act V of Shakespeare's Hamlet.

== Sources ==
- Act V This American Life, Chicago Public Radio, August 9, 2002.
