= KPLR-TV =

Television station in St. Louis

ATSC 3.0 station
- St. Louis, Missouri; United States
- Channels: Digital: 26 (UHF); Virtual: 11
- Branding: STL 11 (pronounced as "St. Louis 11"); Fox 2 News on STL 11

Programming
- Affiliations: 11.1: The CW; for others, see § Subchannels

Ownership
- Owner: Nexstar Media Group; (KPLR, Inc.)
- Sister stations: KTVI; Tegna: KSDK

History
- First air date: April 28, 1959
- Former call signs: KMOX-TV (CP, 1957–1958); KCPP (CP, 1958–1959)
- Former channel numbers: Analog: 11 (VHF, 1959–2009)
- Former affiliations: Independent (1959–1995); The WB (1995–2006); UPN (secondary, 2000–2002)
- Call sign meaning: Harold Koplar (station founder)

Technical information
- Licensing authority: FCC
- Facility ID: 35417
- ERP: 1,000 kW
- HAAT: 315 m (1,033 ft)
- Transmitter coordinates: 38°32′7″N 90°22′23″W

Links
- Public license information: Public file; LMS
- Website: fox2now.com/kplr/

KPLR-TV (channel 11), branded as STL 11, is a television station in St. Louis, Missouri, United States, serving as the local outlet for The CW. It is owned by Nexstar Media Group alongside Fox affiliate KTVI (channel 2); Nexstar's Tegna subsidiary owns NBC affiliate KSDK (channel 5). KPLR-TV and KTVI share studios on Ball Drive in Maryland Heights; KPLR-TV's transmitter is located in Sappington, Missouri.

== History ==
=== As an independent station ===
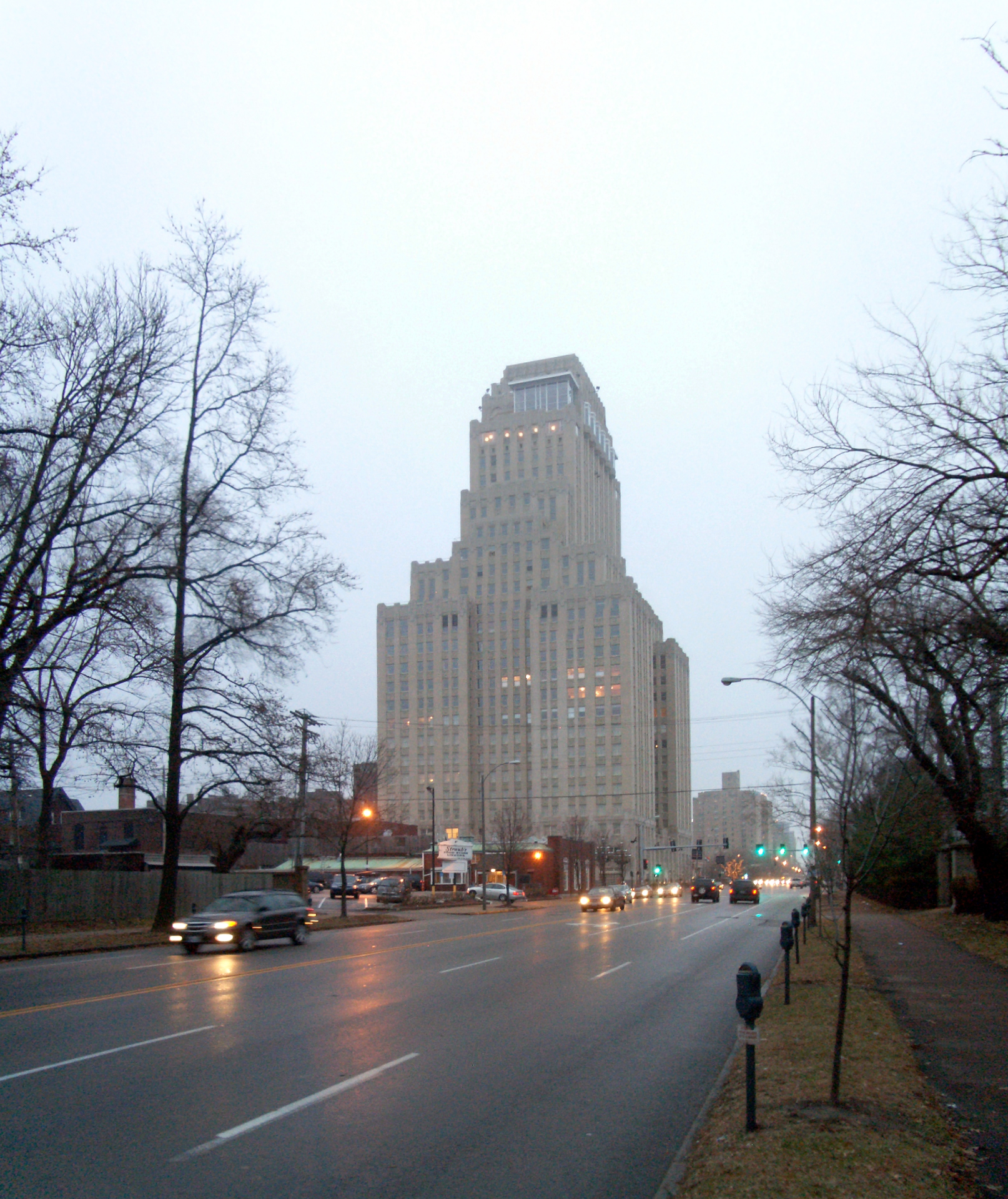
The original KPLR-TV studios were located in the Chase Park Plaza hotel, which was also owned by KPLR founder Harold Koplar.

The station first signed on the air on April 28, 1959, as the first independent station in Missouri. KPLR's call sign was derived from the name of its founding owner, St. Louis real estate developer and hotelier Harold Koplar. Despite losing in his quest to build the station from the ground up, events effectively outside his control would allow him to acquire the license for the station in 1958.

CBS was originally granted a construction permit by the Federal Communications Commission (FCC) to build channel 11 in January 1957, prevailing over three other locally based competitors. But eight months later, CBS decided instead to purchase its existing St. Louis affiliate, KWK-TV (channel 4). As a condition of the channel 4 purchase, the FCC required CBS to relinquish the channel 11 license and construction permit. CBS did so by transferring it to the Koplar group, known as "220 Television, Incorporated", for no financial consideration. Almost immediately, the three-way deal was held up after the St. Louis Amusement Company, one of the original applicants for channel 11, protested to the United States Court of Appeals in January 1958. The U.S. Supreme Court ultimately upheld the decision in November 1958, but CBS had already consummated its deal for channel 4 several months earlier, changing the station's call letters to KMOX-TV—which were intended for channel 11—and operated it for 28 years (it is now Gray Television-owned KMOV). Meanwhile, Koplar went to work building channel 11 on his own, no longer in the face of opposition.

KPLR originally operated from studios within the Koplar-owned Chase Park Plaza Hotel, located on Maryland Plaza in St. Louis' Central West End district. Channel 11 would move into a separate facility adjacent to the hotel several years later. Starting in the mid-1960s, Harold's son Edward J. "Ted" Koplar began working behind the scenes at KPLR, producing sports programming and developing the station's first regular local newscast. Ted Koplar became president and chief executive officer of channel 11 in 1979, and gained complete control of the station upon his father's death in 1985.

For most of its existence, KPLR was a traditional independent station featuring cartoons, sitcoms, movies, drama series and locally produced newscasts. The station was also available on many cable systems in Missouri, Illinois and Arkansas as a regional superstation until the late 1980s. Locally, channel 11's first and only competitor came in June 1969, when Evans Broadcasting launched KDNL-TV (channel 30). The Fox affiliation for the market went to KDNL when that network launched on October 9, 1986. While this was part of a larger affiliation deal with KDNL's then-owner, Cox Broadcasting, most of the markets in KPLR's cable footprint had enough stations by this point to provide a local Fox affiliate. This would have made the prospect of KPLR as a multi-state Fox affiliate unattractive to the Koplars in any event.

On January 17, 1994, the station began airing the Action Pack syndication block; the block's inaugural broadcast, the made-for-TV movie TekWar, earned locally an 11.2 rating/16 share, a 129% increase over that same time period during November 1993.

In the summer of 1994, the station was approached by ABC to negotiate an affiliation agreement with the network to replace KTVI (channel 2)—which had been affiliated with ABC since it signed on as Belleville, Illinois–licensed WTVI on August 10, 1953 (when the station, then broadcasting on UHF channel 54, also maintained a primary CBS affiliation)—as its St. Louis affiliate. KTVI was among the thirteen "Big Three" network-affiliated television stations already owned or in the process of being acquired by New World Communications (and one of three out of the four stations that the group was acquiring from Argyle Television Holdings at the time) that were slated to switch to Fox under a long-term affiliation agreement announced between New World and then-Fox network parent News Corporation on May 23, 1994. Channel 11 station management would later turn the offer down; ABC instead reached an agreement with River City Broadcasting in August 1994 to shift the affiliation to outgoing Fox affiliate KDNL, which swapped network affiliations with KTVI on August 7, 1995.

=== WB affiliation ===
Upon that network's launch, on January 11, 1995, KPLR-TV became a charter affiliate of The WB (a venture between Time Warner and Chicago-based Tribune Broadcasting), marking the first time it maintained an affiliation with a broadcast television network. Koplar had reached a deal to affiliate with The WB in November 1993, more than a year before the network's launch. The WB offered prime time programs only on Wednesday evenings during its first half-season of operation, but would gradually evolve into offering a six-night-a-week schedule by September 1999; as such, for its first few years as a WB affiliate, KPLR continued to fill the 7–9 p.m. time slot with feature films and some first-run syndicated programs on nights when the network did not offer programming. During this period, alongside WB prime time programming and eventually animated series from the Kids' WB children's program block, KPLR carried recent and some older off-network sitcoms and drama series, movies on weekends as well as in prime time on weekdays, some first-run syndicated shows, and a blend of animated and live-action children's shows (including shows acquired via the syndication market as well as The Disney Afternoon block). For many years, even after joining The WB, KPLR was branded on-air as "St. Louis 11", often using a logo with the "O" in "St. Louis" converted into its "circle 11" numeric logo. At one point, KPLR almost picked up Fox Kids since KTVI (which was a part of an affiliation agreement between Fox and New World Communications) declined to carry it, but Fox Kids was turned down by channel 11 station management (including its owner at that time Koplar Communications) because the owner felt that "they had a strong slate of children's programming and no room for the Rangers", and KNLC (channel 24), a religious independent station in the St. Louis market had to pick the affiliation up. Ultimately, by the spring of 1996, due to objections to program content and accompanying national advertising, New Life Evangelistic Center/KNLC owner Rev. Larry Rice began refusing to sell local advertising during the Fox Kids weekday and Saturday blocks ceding local advertising slots to air public service messages from Rice's ministry that discussed various controversial moral issues (such as the death penalty, same-sex marriage and abortion), and reached an agreement with KTVI to carry Fox Kids starting in September 1996, making it the only New World-owned Fox station to carry the block.

On September 26, 1997, Koplar Communications announced it would sell KPLR to ACME Communications (owned by Jamie Kellner, who then also served as the chief executive officer of The WB) for $146 million. Five days later, on October 1, ACME assumed operational responsibilities for the station under a local marketing agreement with Koplar. The sale was finalized on March 1, 1998, ending 38 years of local, family ownership and earning a handsome return on their original investment. It would be ACME's only station on the VHF band during the analog era, as all of the other stations they owned were on UHF. As part of the sale agreement, Ted Koplar signed a three-year contract to remain with KPLR-TV as the station's CEO, along with serving as a consultant to ACME, for an annual salary of $1 million. However, Koplar resigned from KPLR/ACME in October 1999 after one year, citing an irreconcilable rift with ACME management.

KPLR's last logo under WB affiliation, used from 2004 to 2006.

In September 1998, KPLR changed its branding to "WB11". In 2000, KPLR began carrying UPN programming in off-hours, running select prime time shows and cartoons from the network's children's program block, Disney's One Too. UPN programs had previously run on KDNL during overnight and weekend timeslots and then on KNLC (channel 24, which subjected the network to several program preemptions due to content objections by owner, Larry Rice). St. Louis was one of the few top-50 markets without a UPN affiliate. The station continued carrying UPN in off-hours until July 2002, leaving UPN with no St. Louis affiliate until WRBU (channel 46) carried a secondary affiliation in September of that year; WRBU then became a primary UPN affiliate on April 1, 2003.

On December 30, 2002, Tribune Broadcasting announced it would purchase KPLR-TV and sister station KWBP in Portland, Oregon, from ACME Communications for $275 million; the sale was finalized on March 21, 2003. Also in 2003, KPLR moved its studios from the Chase Park Plaza (which by that time, went from a gutted complex where the station had been the only major tenant into a boutique hotel) to a new purpose-built studio facility in Maryland Heights.

=== CW affiliation ===
On January 24, 2006, UPN parent company CBS Corporation (which split from Viacom in December 2005) and WB network parent Time Warner (through its Warner Bros. Entertainment division) announced that they would dissolve the two networks to create The CW, a joint network venture that initially featured a mix of original first-run series and programs that originated on The WB and UPN. The network signed a ten-year affiliation agreement with Tribune Broadcasting for 16 of the 19 WB affiliates that the company owned at the time, including KPLR.

Nearly one month after the CW launch announcement, on February 22, 2006, News Corporation subsidiaries Fox Television Stations and Twentieth Television announced the launch of MyNetworkTV, a network created primarily to serve as a network programming option for UPN and WB stations that were left out of The CW's affiliation deals. Three weeks later, on March 9, WRBU was confirmed to be the St. Louis market's MyNetworkTV affiliate. KPLR-TV remained a WB affiliate until the network ceased operations on September 17, 2006; when the station affiliated with The CW upon that network's debut on September 18, KPLR began branding as "CW 11". (WRBU joined MyNetworkTV upon that network's launch on September 5.)

On September 17, 2008, Tribune announced that it would enter KPLR into a local marketing agreement with Fox affiliate KTVI effective October 1, as a result of the formation of a "broadcast management company" that was created to provide management services to stations owned by both Tribune Broadcasting and KTVI owner Local TV. Although KTVI was the senior partner in the deal, it vacated its longtime studios in the Clayton-Tamm/Dogtown neighborhood on St. Louis' west side and moved its operations to KPLR's Maryland Heights facility. The LMA resulted in both stations combining their news departments and sharing certain syndicated programs. On November 1, 2008, the station changed its on-air branding from "CW11" to "KPLR 11" as several Tribune-owned CW affiliates began shifting away from using references to the network within their station branding, and reincorporated the Gateway Arch into its logo (essentially, a revision of the logo that KPLR used following the Tribune purchase as a WB affiliate).

Tribune bought KTVI outright on July 1, 2013, as part of its $2.75 billion acquisition of Local TV; the sale received FCC approval on December 20, and was completed on December 27, creating the first legal station duopoly in the St. Louis market between KTVI and KPLR. Tribune's direct purchase of KTVI to form a duopoly with KPLR was possible as, in recent years, KPLR and KDNL have rotated between fourth and fifth place in total day viewership due to the weaker viewership of KDNL's programming since its news department was shut down by Sinclair in 2001 (KPLR ranked in fifth place in total day ratings at the time of the purchase, with KDNL ranking in fourth place).

=== Aborted sale to Sinclair; sale to Nexstar ===
Sinclair—which has owned KDNL-TV since the group's 1996 acquisition of its previous corporate parent River City Broadcasting—entered into an agreement to acquire Tribune Media on May 8, 2017, for $3.9 billion, plus the assumption of $2.7 billion in Tribune debt. Prohibited from owning all three stations, Sinclair would have been required to sell KPLR to a third party to comply with ownership rules and alleviate potential antitrust issues. The deal received significant scrutiny over Sinclair's forthrightness in its applications to sell certain conflict properties, prompting the FCC to designate it for hearing and leading Tribune to terminate the deal and sue Sinclair for breach of contract.

Following the Sinclair deal's collapse, Nexstar Media Group of Irving, Texas, announced its purchase of Tribune Media on December 3, 2018, for $6.4 billion in cash and debt. The sale was completed on September 19, 2019.

In August 2025, Nexstar agreed to acquire Tegna, owner of KSDK (channel 5), for $6.2 billion. The deal was completed on March 19, 2026, and included approval for Nexstar to own three full-power station licenses in markets such as St. Louis. A temporary restraining order issued one week later by the U.S. District Court for the Eastern District of California, later escalated to a preliminary injunction, has prevented Nexstar from integrating the stations.

== Programming ==
Since 2008, KPLR has aired CW network programming from 8 to 10 p.m. Central Time, one hour after the network-recommended timeslot for its programming in that time zone but consistent with its local airtimes in the Eastern and Pacific time zones, in order to air a 7 p.m. local newscast. This practice extends to programming such as WWE NXT which typically airs live on The CW's other Central Time affiliates.

KPLR also airs Fox programs that are preempted for other broadcasts by KTVI, such as local newscasts. For example, a 2021 college football matchup between Illinois and Nebraska was moved to KPLR due to KTVI's obligation to air Green Bay Packers preseason games.

=== Sports programming ===
KPLR-TV served as the home broadcaster of MLB's St. Louis Cardinals (for two stints from 1959 to 1962 and 1988 to 2006), the NBA's St. Louis Hawks (1959–1968) and the NHL's St. Louis Blues (for three stints from 1967 to 1976, 1982–83 and 1986 to April 21, 2009, the last Blues telecast on KPLR being a Stanley Cup playoff loss to the Vancouver Canucks). Both the Cardinals and Blues are now exclusive to FanDuel Sports Network Midwest, which formerly (as FSN Midwest) produced the games for the station throughout the late 90s and early 2000s. The production of the games before that time was from Bud Sports Productions, a division of Anheuser-Busch. During its WB years, KPLR-TV also syndicated its coverage of the Cardinals games to other stations in Arkansas, Iowa, Indiana, Kentucky, Missouri, Oklahoma, and Tennessee.

On May 23, 1959, the station debuted Wrestling at the Chase, a professional wrestling program that was originally produced from Chase Park Plaza's Khorassan Ballroom (until 1970). The show featured the most famous wrestlers in the National Wrestling Alliance, which was controlled in part by St. Louis promoter Sam Muchnick. Participants included Ric Flair, Harley Race, former NFL player Dick the Bruiser and Ted DiBiase, and is considered one of the wrestling industry's most historic programs. About 1,100 episodes were produced during the show's run, which ended on September 10, 1983, when Muchnick retired from promoting and handed the slot over to the World Wrestling Federation. Even after WWF took over the programming, they still taped matches at the KPLR studios and aired a variant of its syndicated programming under the Wrestling at the Chase banner, mostly offered to Midwestern stations who had previously aired Muchnick shows. Arguably KPLR's most notable wrestling moment came after it ceased airing locally produced content: on December 27, 1983, a Wrestling at the Chase taping contained the WWF debut of Hulk Hogan, who would become an international superstar with the promotion. KPLR produced a retrospective of the program in 1999, consisting mostly of latter-era footage plus interview clips of Muchnick's wrestlers and other employees, as well as others associated with the St. Louis sports scene such as Bob Costas and Joe Garagiola, the latter the program's first host. Included were clips from the program's only known surviving early episode, from 1962, which Garagiola recorded as an audition tape before leaving the program and kept throughout the years.

From April 9, 2006, to September 7, 2008, KPLR produced The Fan Show, a live sports talk program that was hosted by sports director Rich Gould, featuring audience-participation games and discussion. It was originally broadcast from The Casino Queen's Club Sevens for the first 20 months of its run, before the program relocated to AJ's Bar and Grill in December 2007.

=== Children's programming ===
From 1959 to 1968, KPLR aired the after-school children's program Captain 11's Showboat, which introduced The Three Stooges to St. Louis area television viewers. Captain 11 was played by longtime radio personality Harry Fender. Ted Koplar also diversified his family's entertainment holdings during his time at the helm of KPLR. This was most notably achieved through World Events Productions, which distributed three animated series Voltron: Defender of the Universe, Saber Rider and the Star Sheriffs, and Denver, the Last Dinosaur.

=== News operation ===
KPLR presently broadcasts 22 hours of locally produced newscasts each week; including a public affairs program on Saturday evenings called The Pulse of St. Louis, which airs over the final 45 minutes of the 7 p.m. newscast, and a weekly sports highlight program on Sunday evenings called Sunday Sports Extra, which also airs during that newscast.

Channel 11 has aired local news programs since its sign-on, and was one of the first independent stations in the country to have a functioning news department. Like most stations that are not affiliated with one of the Big Three networks, KPLR had traditionally aired a prime time newscast at 9 p.m. that ran one hour ahead of the late newscasts seen on the major network affiliates; for much of the time prior to 2008, KPLR's 9 p.m. newscast ran as a half-hour program. After KTVI moved its late evening newscast to 9 p.m. following its August 1995 switch from ABC to Fox, that station's prime time newscast consistently beat KPLR's in the ratings.

In the past, KPLR has attempted to format its newscasts to attract a younger audience, employing anchors under the age of 35 and featuring a more fast-paced reporting style. Nevertheless, KPLR has often been acknowledged by St. Louis Post-Dispatch television critics as a station strong on "sweeps stories", running one or more major investigative pieces during the November, February and May sweeps periods. KPLR's stories have also been seen as much more broad-based and less sensationalistic compared to other stations.

After entering into the local marketing agreement with KTVI, major changes were made to KPLR's news programming. First on September 8, 2008, KPLR shifted the flagship 9 p.m. newscast to 7 p.m. and expanded the program to one hour, trading timeslots with The CW's prime time schedule, which the station moved to 8–10 p.m. (instead of the network-recommended 7–9 p.m. Central Time slot) with the network's permission; this effectively resulted in the newscast being reduced to airing only on Monday through Friday evenings in part due to The CW airing a three-hour prime time lineup on Sundays at the time (although The CW turned its Sunday prime time slots over to the network's affiliates in September 2009, the 7 p.m. newscast would not expand to weekends until September 2012). The station cited an underserved younger audience in the 9 p.m. timeslot with the Big Three stations airing network programming meant for older viewers and competition from KTVI's 9 p.m. newscast as reasons behind the move.

In December 2008, KPLR moved production of its news programs to a temporary set in KTVI's Hampton studios as the Maryland Heights facility was being remodeled to accommodate both KPLR and KTVI's newscasts. On February 16, 2009, KPLR became the fourth St. Louis television station to begin broadcasting its local newscasts in high definition (one day after KTVI converted its newscasts to HD), broadcasting from a newly remodeled studio (which contained pieces from the KTVI's former "Studio B" set, along with a modernized news desk and a state-of-the-art weather center) that is located adjacent to the main news set now occupied by KTVI. Since KPLR and KTVI's news departments merged, there has been considerable sharing between the two stations in regards to news coverage, video footage and the use of reporters, although both outlets maintain their own primary on-air personalities (such as news and sports anchors) that only appear on one station. On April 6, 2009, KPLR debuted an hour-long midday newscast at noon on weekdays. This was followed on September 20, 2010, with the debut of an hour-long afternoon newscast at 4 p.m. On December 23, 2011, KPLR/KTVI opened a news bureau in the newly renovated Peabody Opera House in downtown St. Louis, to better serve the downtown and eastern portion of the St. Louis metropolitan area.

On January 28, 2015, both stations introduced a new combined set with LED lighting, two video walls, and a new anchor desk. Both stations now share the set but KPLR has a separate weather center. They also introduced new graphics and music package for both stations the same day.

In mid-2019, both stations introduced The Power of Two: Midday, replacing Fox 2 News Midday and News 11 at Noon. The program is aired live at 11 a.m. on KTVI and KPLR.

On January 30, 2020, both stations introduced a new graphics package and music package for each station. KPLR's simulcasts with KTVI uses the same music package, "Beyond", while KPLR-specific newscasts use "Inergy", both were created by Stephen Arnold Music.

In spring 2020, both stations introduced The Power of Two at 6 am, which is simulcast on KTVI and KPLR. While branded for both stations, it is largely targeted towards the KTVI audience, as it is part of Fox 2 News in The Morning.

In February 2021, both stations overhauled their set again with an expansion of the physical studio space with multiple venues and a larger video wall. KPLR no longer has a separate weather center, now just appearing on the same set as KTVI.

In February 2025, KPLR-TV's newscasts were rebranded to come under KTVI's Fox 2 News branding.

==== Notable former on-air staff ====
- Charles Jaco – political and war correspondent
- Julie Piekarski – entertainment reporter (1986–1988)

== Technical information ==
=== Subchannels ===
The station's ATSC 1.0 channels are carried on the multiplexed signals of other St. Louis television stations:

Subchannels provided by KPLR-TV (ATSC 1.0)
Subchannel	Res.	Short name	Programming	ATSC 1.0 host
11.1	720p	KPLR-DT	The CW	KTVI
11.2	480i	365BLK	365BLK	KDNL-TV
11.3	480i	Comet	Comet	KSDK
11.4	480i	Outlaw	Outlaw	KMOV

On May 31, 2006, KPLR added The Tube Music Network to digital subchannel 11.2; The Tube later abruptly suspended its operations on October 1, 2007. In 2010, the 11.2 subchannel became an affiliate of This TV. On January 1, 2016, the 11.3 subchannel became a Comet affiliate.

=== Analog-to-digital conversion ===
KPLR-TV shut down its analog signal, over VHF channel 11, on June 12, 2009, the official date on which full-power television stations in the United States transitioned from analog to digital broadcasts under federal mandate. The station's digital signal continued to broadcast on its pre-transition UHF channel 26, using virtual channel 11.

=== ATSC 3.0 ===
Subchannels of KPLR-TV (ATSC 3.0)
Channel	Short name	Programming
2.1	KTVI-DT	Fox (KTVI)
4.1	KMOV-HD	CBS (KMOV)
5.1	KSDK-5	NBC (KSDK)
11.1	KPLR-DT	The CW
30.1	KDNL	KDNL-TV (Independent)
30.10	T2	T2

Subchannel broadcast with digital rights management
Subchannel streamed via the Internet
