= Saint Louis University Museum of Art =

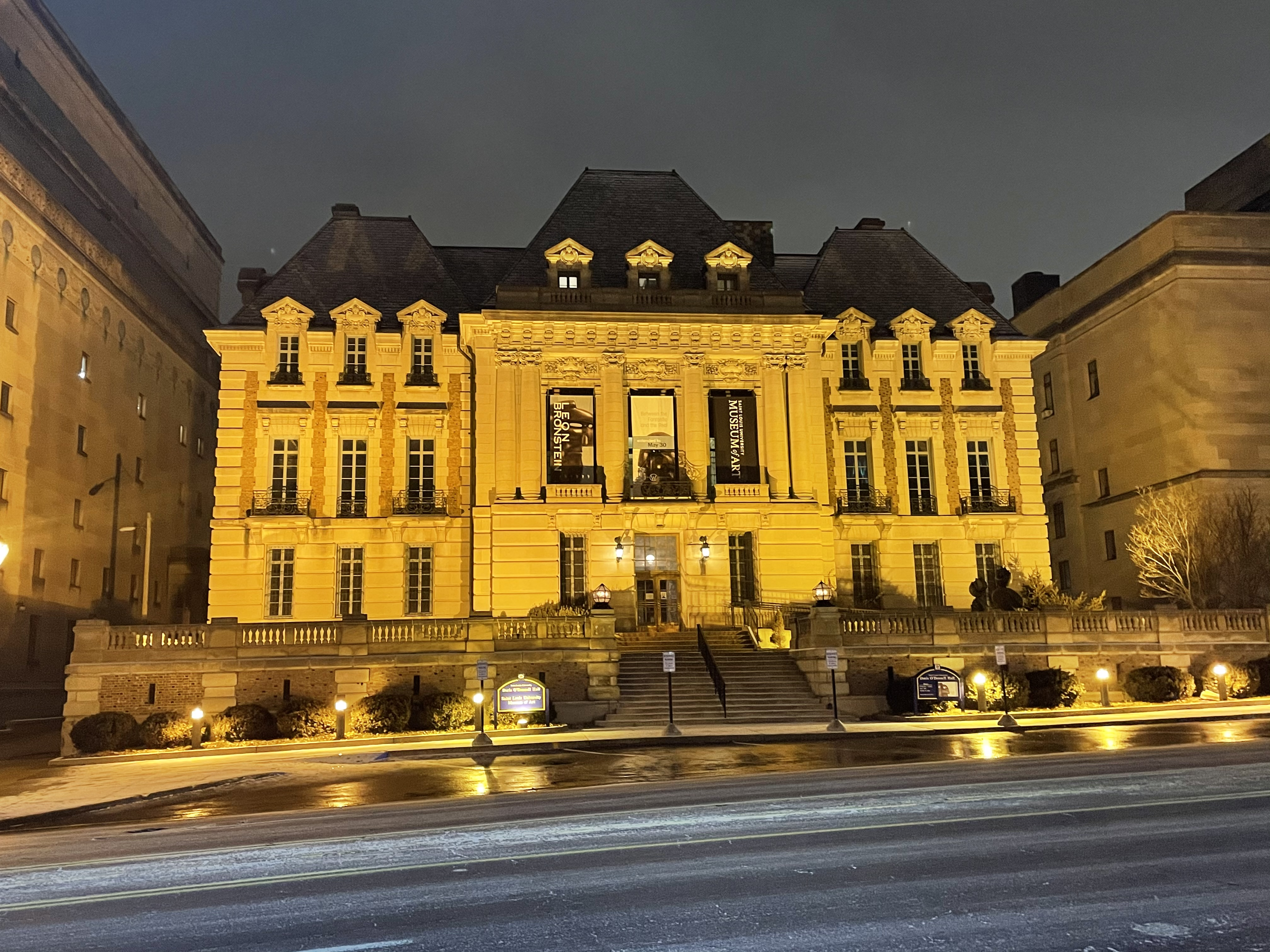

- Location within Missouri
- 38°38′19.19″N 90°14′2.82″W
- Location: Central West End, St. Louis, Missouri

History
- Built: 1899
- Built for: St. Louis Club

St. Louis Landmark
- Type: Structure
- Reference no.: 21

The Saint Louis University Museum of Art is the formal art museum for Saint Louis University. It is located at 3663 Lindell Boulevard in St. Louis, Missouri and is also known as Doris O'Donnell Hall.

== Architecture ==
Designed in the Beaux-Arts architectural style, the building has a raised basement of rusticated limestone and a high-pitched mansard roof. The front(south-facing) façade is organized in a tripartite fashion, with the central block displaying Ionic-style columns, as well as corbelled entablature. The flanking sections have tall casement windows with limestone surrounds and ornamental wall dormers.

== History ==
The St. Louis Club in 1909

Completed in 1900, the four-story building originally hosted the St. Louis Club, an organization founded in 1878. The principal architect of the building was Arthur Dillon of the New York firm Friedlander and Dillon.

While hosting the St. Louis Club, the building became the location of many historical moments. In 1902, Prince Henry of Prussia was entertained at the club during a visit to St. Louis. Much of the planning for the 1904 World's Fair was carried out on the site. The building was also visited by U.S. Presidents Cleveland, McKinley, Taft, Roosevelt, Wilson, and Harding.

After a fire in 1925, the F. W. Woolworth Company bought the building and converted it into offices which served as the regional headquarters for the company. Saint Louis University purchased the building in 1992 from alumnus Dr. Francis O'Donnell Jr. and used it for classrooms until it converted the structure to a museum in 1998. The building is named Doris O'Donnell hall in honor of Dr. O'Donnell's mother, who was a long-time employee of the university. It is a designated historic landmark by the city of St. Louis.

== Permanent collection and past exhibitions ==
As of April 2022, there are 241 pieces in the museum's permanent collection, including works by Achille Perilli, Adam Emory Albright, Anton Heyboer, and Salvador Dalí. Past exhibitions at the museum have showcased the work of Leon Bronstein, Tennessee Williams, Leo Ray, and Edward Boccia.

== See also ==
- Contemporary Art Museum St. Louis, another art museum in the neighborhood
- Delaware History Museum, another museum in a converted Woolworth's building
