= Robert K. Futterman =

American businessman

- Born: 1958 (age 67–68)
- Occupation: Real estate developer
- Known for: Founder of Robert K. Futterman & Associates
- Spouse: Hollie Watman (fiancé)
- Parent(s): Rosalie Futterman; Louis Futterman

Robert K. Futterman (born 1958 in Long Island, New York) was the founder, chairman & chief executive officer of Robert K. Futterman & Associates, a retail leasing, investment sales and consulting services real estate firm. Futterman has been noted as one of the most prominent and powerful names in Manhattan retail and has personally completed real estate transactions in excess of $10 billion. He has helped revitalize Manhattan neighborhoods including Union Square, the Meatpacking District, Times Square, 34th Street, Fifth Avenue, the Plaza District, and Soho.

== Early life and education ==
Futterman was raised in Jericho, New York, the son of Rosalie and Louis Futterman. His mother was a painter; and his father was a businessman and manufacturer. Originally intending to get into the music business, as a student at the University of Maryland, he represented the school in negotiations with concert promoters Bill Graham (promoter) and Ron Delsener. Not seeing any opportunities in music, he left university and went to Zuma Beach in California to sell ice cream.

== Career ==
In 1983, he returned to New York City to work at Garrick-Aug Associates, a Manhattan retail brokerage firm, where he earned $250 a week as a retail-store canvasser, making cold calls to landlords that had retail space for rent. He was quite successful and was soon promoted to salesman. By 1993, he was running Garrick-Aug's New York City operations.

In 1998, after noticing that very few real estate firms specialized exclusively on the retail sector (landlord and tenant representation, new construction, leasing, sales, and market analysis), Futterman founded Robert K. Futterman & Associates (RKF). He has since expanded the company into one of the country's largest independent real estate firms specializing in retail leasing, consulting services, and investment sales. As of 2011, the company has arranged sales and leasing transactions valued at nearly $20 billion. RKF is headquartered at 521 Fifth Avenue in New York and also has offices in Las Vegas, Los Angeles, Rutherford, New Jersey, Miami, and San Francisco.

In May 2019, he was fired as the CEO of RKF due to marijuana charges.

== Transactions ==
He has been involved in most vertical retail projects in New York, including Herald Center, the Manhattan Mall, The Shops at Columbus Circle at Time Warner Center, and 270 Greenwich Street (also known as 101 Warren Street); among others.

Additionally, Futterman has served as an advisor to the Port Authority of New York & New Jersey for the World Trade Center redevelopment, and has also worked on behalf of the Metropolitan Transportation Authority for Grand Central Terminal. He is a member of the Retail Real Estate Board of New York and the International Council of Shopping Centers.

=== Miracle Mile Shops ===
Futterman has also been involved in the repositioning and rebranding of Desert Passage, a failing, low-traffic mall, into Miracle Mile Shops, a 475,000-square-foot Las Vegas retail shopping and entertainment powerhouse. He has been the leasing and marketing advisor since the onset of the rebranding. As of 2011, Miracle Mile Shops saw 24 consecutive months of impressive sales and traffic increases at the center. RKF recruited national retailers including Ben Sherman, QuikSilver, Marciano, Trader Vic's, among many others. The mall has continued to grow to over 170 shops, restaurants and entertainment venues that serve approximately 80,000 people each day and nearly 30 million visitors per year. Miracle Mile Shops has been one of the most successful repositionings of a major mall in the U.S.

== Awards ==
Futterman is a four-time recipient of the Real Estate Board of New York (REBNY) Retail Deal of the Year. He has been recognized for the following:

- 2010 The Deal That Most Benefits Manhattan for arranging the 45,283-square-foot lease at 240 East 86th Street with Fairway Like No Other Market, which will be the first new grocery store to open on the Upper East Side in 30 years;
- 2009 Most Creative Retail Deal of the Year for the marketing and leasing of 254,736 square feet of available retail space at The Times Square Building and the creation of a multi-level entertainment destination with tenants including Discovery TSX and Bowlmor Lanes;
- 2005 Most Creative Retail Deal of the Year for arranging the 22,500-square-foot retail lease with Apple Fifth Avenue, the GM Building. This was done in cooperation with Open Realty of Dallas, TX;
- 2001 Retail Deal of the Year Award for facilitating the 20,000-square-foot lease for Ethan Allen's flagship location at 101 West End Avenue.

== Personal life ==
Futterman has been married twice. His first wife was Marjorie Futterman; they had two sons together: Jesse and Kevin. He is engaged to clothing designer, Hollie Watman.

=== DUI Arrest ===
On July 23, 2019, Robert K. Futterman, a 60-year-old who has a house in Sag Harbor, New York, was charged with driving under the influence of drugs, as a felony due to a prior felony conviction, two counts of criminal possession of a controlled substance in the seventh degree, a misdemeanor, and unlawful possession of marijuana. Futterman has a history of drunken driving-related arrests, including one for boating while intoxicated just last week. He was arrested in connection with a crash in Bridgehampton, NY on Tuesday July 23, that saw a mother and young child airlifted to Stony Brook University Hospital.

=== Felony conviction ===
On August 21, 2011, Robert K. Futterman was arrested on drunk driving charges on Sag Harbor Turnpike with four children under the age of 16 in his car. He was charged with multiple counts including violations of Leandra's Law, which made it a felony on the first offense to drive while intoxicated with children younger than 16 years old in the car. On February 3, 2012, Futterman pleaded guilty in Suffolk County Criminal Court to the aggravated felony count, and the misdemeanor count of driving while impaired by a drug.
