= Harland Bartholomew =

American urban planner (1889–1989)

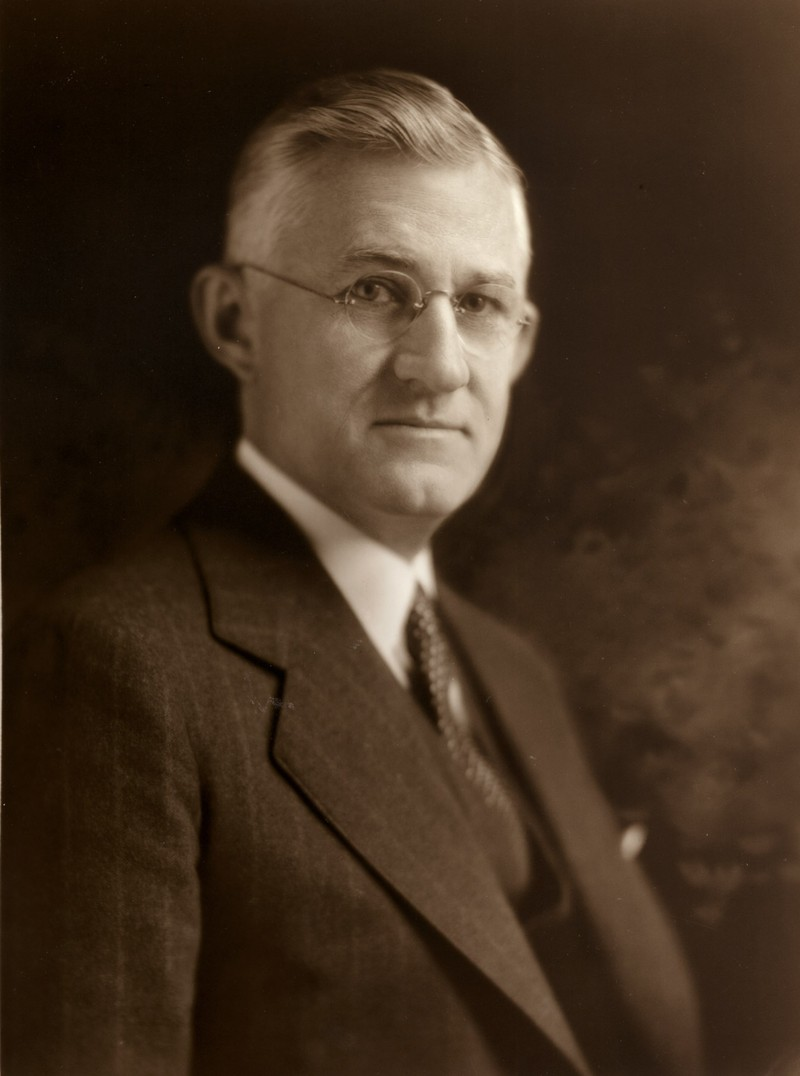
- Born: September 14, 1889; Stoneham, Massachusetts, U.S.
- Died: December 2, 1989 (aged 100); Clayton, Missouri, U.S.
- Education: Erasmus High School, Rutgers University
- Years active: 1911–1962

Harland Bartholomew (September 14, 1889 – December 2, 1989) was the first full-time urban planner employed by an American city. A civil engineer by training, Harland was a planner with St. Louis, Missouri, for 37 years. His work and teachings were widely influential, particularly on the use of government to enforce racial segregation in land use.

== Early life and education ==
Bartholomew was born in Stoneham, Massachusetts, on September 14, 1889. He moved to New York City when he was 15 and attended Erasmus High School in Brooklyn. He completed two years of a civil engineering degree at Rutgers University but ran out of money to continue its completion. He was later awarded an honorary degree in civil engineering from Rutgers University in 1921. In 1912, he began working with E.P. Goodrich, a civil engineering firm that was a strong advocate for the efficient planning of cities. His work with Goodrich consisted principally of conducting traffic counts on bridges, a task that Bartholomew found dreary but that prepared him for a life of planning around infrastructure and automobility.

== Career ==
In 1914, the Newark, New Jersey plan commission retained Bartholomew as the first full-time, public-sector city planner in the U.S. The following year, prominent civic reform advocate Luther Ely Smith, on the advice of the architect Henry Wright, recruited Bartholomew to serve as the first planner of St. Louis, Missouri. He served in that capacity until 1950. In 1917, Bartholomew was a founding member of the American City Planning Institute and headed one of the largest planning consulting firms in the United States. In 1919, he established Harland Bartholomew and Associates; he served as its chairman until his retirement in 1962.

From 1918 to 1956, Bartholomew taught civic design at the University of Illinois and made substantial contributions to the scholarly and practice literature in city planning. In 1932, he completed his landmark study Urban Land Uses, published by Harvard University Press in the City Planning series edited by Theodora and Charles Hubbard. Bartholomew also published dozens of studies and articles in venues including the City Planning Conference Proceedings, American City, The "Annals of the American Academy of Social and Political Science", American Civic Annual, City Planning, the "Journal of Land and Public Utility Economics", and the National Conference on City Planning Bulletin. His writing covered a wide range of practices. He wrote on topics such as the theory and practice of zoning, street widening, cost distribution, placement of railroads, easements, federal buildings in cities, growth controls, economic disintegration, subdivision layout, slum clearance, metropolitan and regional planning, and the role of neighborhoods in the plan process.

Bartholomew was appointed to Federal planning committees by three U.S. presidents: Herbert Hoover, Franklin D. Roosevelt, and Dwight D. Eisenhower. His career was noted particularly by the Eisenhower administration for his work on the Washington Metro, as chairman of the National Capital Planning Commission, and as a leading advocate of society-first planning for freeways.

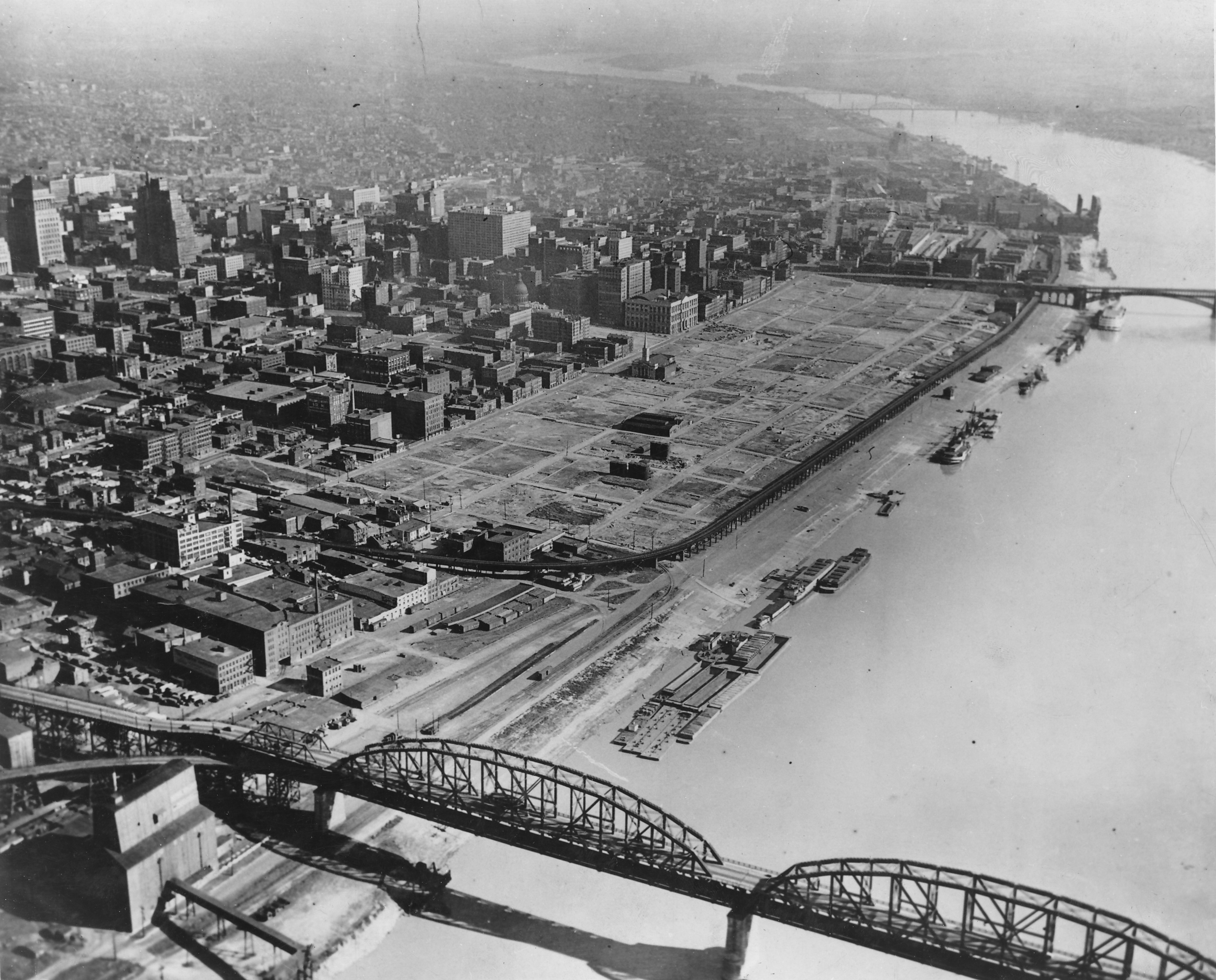
40 blocks and 486 buildings were demolished

Many of Bartholomew's views are discredited today. For example, he pioneered urban renewal through eminent domain in 1938 to clear the St. Louis Waterfront for the Gateway Arch National Park, then known as the Jefferson National Expansion Memorial. He advanced the concept of identifying "obsolete neighborhoods" through cost accounting (amount of taxes garnered versus city services expended), and was a major advocate for functional single-use zoning and for automobile-oriented planning.

== Racial segregation ==
In St. Louis, Bartholomew used planning to maintain racial segregation in cooperation with local realtor associations. In several other cities, Bartholomew's planning was found to be in line with racial, social, and economic segregation. Bartholomew also drew upon racially-inequitable metaphors in the 1947 St. Louis city plan to spur residents to accept the necessity of his planning recommendations. His exclusionary approach, if adopted, meant that only whites would see the promising future that he envisioned.

In St. Louis, Bartholomew said an important goal was to prevent movement "by colored people" into "finer residential districts." He estimated where blacks were likely to live and created restrictions to keep them out of white areas.

== Planning activities conducted ==
- 1911–1915 Newark, New Jersey, comprehensive plan
- 1916–1920 St. Louis, Missouri, comprehensive plan
- 1920 Hamilton, Ohio, comprehensive plan
- 1920 Memphis, Tennessee, comprehensive plan
- 1920–1921 Lansing, Michigan, comprehensive plan (link)
- 1921–1922 Madison, Wisconsin, comprehensive plan
- 1921–1922 Wichita, Kansas, comprehensive plan
- 1922 Evansville, Indiana, comprehensive plan
- 1924 Los Angeles, California, transportation plan
- 1924 Chattanooga, Tennessee, transportation plan, parks and recreation plan
- 1924 South Bend, Indiana, streets report (link)
- 1925 Kenosha, Wisconsin, comprehensive plan
- 1927 Fort Worth, Texas, street and transportation plan
- 1927 Peoria, Illinois, comprehensive plan
- 1927 Grand Rapids, Michigan. land use and transportation plan.
- 1926–1930 Vancouver, British Columbia, comprehensive plan
- 1928 Saint Louis County, Missouri, transportation plan
- 1928 Glendale, California, comprehensive plan
- 1929 Louisville, Kentucky, A Major Street Plan
- 1929 Rochester, New York, comprehensive plan
- 1930 San Antonio, Texas, comprehensive plan
- 1930–1934 St. Louis Regional Plan
- 1932 Louisville, Kentucky The Negro Housing Problem in Louisville
- 1935 Williamsburg, Virginia, Colonial National Parkway tunnel
- 1931–1939 Edited "Land Subdivision Manual", Manual 16 published by The American Society of Civil Engineer
- 1940–1944 Interstate Highway System, Principles for locating highways in urban areas
- 1953–1959 Transportation Plan, Washington, D.C.
- 1953, “A Report Upon Land Use and the Amended Zoning Ordinance”, Cedar Rapids, IA

== See also ==
- Eldridge Lovelace
- American Planning Association
- City planning
