= Eldridge Lovelace =

American city planner and author

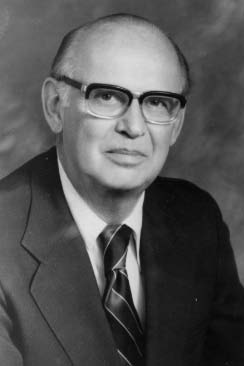
- Born: March 16, 1913; Kansas City, Kansas
- Died: November 7, 2008 (aged 95)
- Occupation: Urban planner

Eldridge Hirst Lovelace (March 16, 1913 – November 7, 2008) was an American city planner and author who prepared comprehensive plans for many large US cities.

== Early life ==
Lovelace was born in Kansas City, Kansas, on March 16, 1913.

He was married to Marjorie Van Evera Lovelace from 1937 to her death in 2005. They had two children: Jeanie Lovelace Stinchcombe and Richard V. E. Lovelace.

== Education ==
He attended the University of Kansas and the University of Illinois, and in 1935 he received his Bachelor of Fine Arts degree in Landscape Architecture from the University of Illinois He studied under Harland Bartholomew, who was Professor of Civic Design at Illinois, and upon graduation he joined the firm Harland Bartholomew and Associates in St. Louis.

== City planner ==
Lovelace's professional career was entirely with Harland Bartholomew and Associates. He became partner in 1943, senior partner in 1961, and chairman of the board upon the firm's incorporation in 1978. He retired in 1981.

During the 46 years that Lovelace was with Harland Bartholomew and Associates, he prepared comprehensive plans for such cities as:

- Washington, D.C.
- Vancouver, British Columbia
- Dallas, Texas
- Waco, Texas
- Corpus Christi, Texas
- Lincoln, Nebraska
- Oklahoma City, Oklahoma
- Baton Rouge, Louisiana
- Hamilton County, Ohio
- Kansas City, Kansas
- St. Louis County, Missouri
- Racine, Wisconsin
- Kenosha, Wisconsin

He also prepared comprehensive plans for numerous smaller cities and suburbs, particularly those of St. Louis, Chicago, and Cincinnati.

Lovelace was recognized as an authority in long-range planning, including plans for military installations. During his career, he prepared plans for naval facilities in Hawaii and the Philippine Islands as well as numerous Army and Air Force installations across the country.

In his long career, Lovelace also prepared land-use control programs and site planning projects in the United States and Canada. His site-planning projects included Kaanapali, Hawaii, and the grounds at the Gateway Arch National Park (then known as Jefferson National Expansion Memorial) in St. Louis, Missouri.

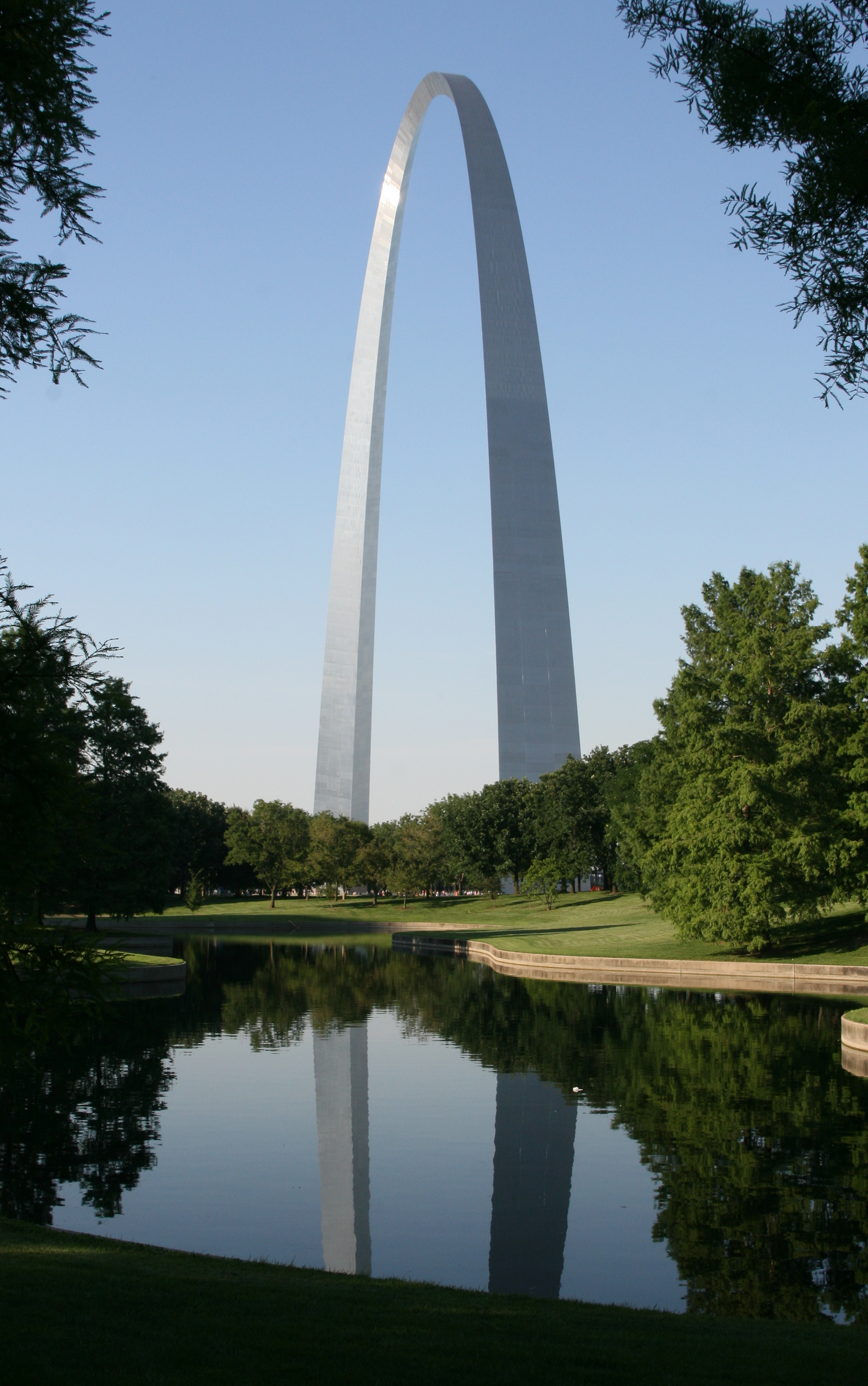
Grounds at the Gateway Arch National Park

He offered expert testimony in numerous land use control litigation cases.

Lovelace devised methodologies for relating urban park and recreational plans to the needs and interests of a population. Notable works in this field include the master plan for Balboa Park in San Diego, California, and for the park system of Charlotte and Mecklenburg counties in North Carolina. He also prepared plans for recreation areas, including Cannon Reservoir, Missouri, and Babler State Park, also in Missouri.

In another facet of his career, Lovelace prepared campus master plans for universities and secondary schools in Wisconsin, Alabama, New York, and Hawaii. He also prepared plans for private residences and neighborhoods. One of Lovelace's last design interests was a courtyard for the University of Toronto Biological Station at Joker's Hill.

Lovelace investigated the problems of the extension of cities. Along with Herbert Hare, he developed the concept of planning for flooding during urbanization. Lovelace and William Weismantel developed concept of the Density Zoning. Lovelace also worked on land protection.

== Organizational membership ==
Lovelace was a Fellow of the American Society of Landscape Architects. He served as National Secretary and as the first chairman of Council of Fellows of the American Society of Landscape Architects. He was also the ASLA delegate to the International Federation of Landscape Architects for six years, after which he served as Secretary General and as Vice President (1975–77).

Lovelace was a Fellow of the American Society of Civil Engineers and a member of the American Institute of Certified Planners. He was a member of the American Institute of Consulting Engineers and the National Society of Professional Engineers. In addition to his professional memberships, Lovelace participated in and supported numerous civic and environmental organizations, from The Nature Conservancy to the Missouri Prairie Foundation.

Lovelace was active in the Open Space Council of Metropolitan Saint Louis and served as its secretary and president. He was a member of the American Planning Association St. Louis Metropolitan Section.

In 1971 Lovelace was appointed a Commissioner of Tower Grove Park, and he later served as board president, from 1988 to 1995. The master plan that he had prepared for the park in 1985 was adopted by the board and provided the basis for critical rehabilitation and reforestation within the park. He remained deeply interested in the park as a commissioner emeritus.

== Awards ==
In December 2006, the St. Louis chapter of the American Society of Landscape Architects selected Eldridge Lovelace to receive the Robert Goetz Award for a Distinguished Career in Landscape Architecture. This award recognizes a landscape architect who has practiced the profession with integrity, distinction, and excellence.

== Works ==
Eldridge Lovelace contributed numerous articles to professional journals and to newspapers and authored one book:

- Lovelace, Eldridge, 1992, Harland Bartholomew: His Contributions to American Urban Planning, Published by University of Illinois at Urbana-Champaign, Department of Urban and Regional Planning.
- Lovelace, E.H., Papers, Vol. I, 1943-1965

== See also ==
- Harland Bartholomew
- American Planning Association
- City planning
- Urbanization
