= Luther Ely Smith =

American lawyer and St. Louis booster (1873–1951)

- Born: June 11, 1873; Downers Grove, Illinois, US
- Died: April 2, 1951 (aged 77); St. Louis, Missouri, US
- Resting place: Bellefontaine Cemetery, St. Louis, Missouri
- Education: Amherst College (1894); Washington University in St. Louis (1897)
- Occupation: Lawyer
- Known for: Founder of Gateway Arch National Park
- Spouse: Sa Lees Kennard
- Children: 3

Luther Ely Smith (June 11, 1873 – April 2, 1951) was a St. Louis, Missouri lawyer and civic booster. He has been described by the National Park Service as the "father of the Jefferson National Expansion Memorial," which was renamed as the Gateway Arch National Park in 2018. In the 1930s, he conceived of the idea of a memorial to President Thomas Jefferson in St. Louis, the starting point of the Lewis and Clark Expedition and opening of the West through the city. He chaired the Association to develop the memorial for nearly 15 years, every year but one from 1934 through 1949, after the design competition had been completed and the winner Eero Saarinen selected for his "Gateway Arch". Construction of the Gateway Arch started in 1963, after Smith's death; it fulfilled his vision of a symbol of the city to represent its role with the American West.

== Early life ==
Luther Ely Smith was born in Downers Grove, Illinois. He attended prep school at Williston Northampton School in Easthampton, Massachusetts graduating in 1890; Amherst College, where he was a classmate of Harlan F. Stone, future Chief Justice of the United States; and a year ahead of Calvin Coolidge and Dwight W. Morrow. He graduated in 1894 and earned a law degree at Washington University School of Law in 1897.

He volunteered with the Third U.S Volunteer Engineers during the Spanish–American War (1898).

== St. Louis Booster ==
After the war Smith started a law practice in St. Louis. He also became active in various civic functions; in 1914 he started the pageant-Masques on Art Hill in Forest Park. The outdoor pageants gradually were developed as The MUNY theatre, an open-air forum.

Smith was appointed by the mayor as the chairman of the City Plan Commission in 1916. The Commission hired Harland Bartholomew as city planner that year, making St. Louis the first city to have such a full-time position.

During the Great War (World War I), he volunteered and served as a captain in the field artillery. After the war Smith turned his attention again to the development of center city St. Louis. He worked on establishing the Memorial Plaza—a collection of landmark buildings including the Civil Courts Building and Kiel Auditorium.

== Gateway Arch National Park ==
In the 1920s his Amherst school-mate Calvin Coolidge, then President of the United States, appointed him to a federal commission to supervise design and construction of the George Rogers Clark Memorial in Vincennes, Indiana.

In the 1930s during the Great Depression, the United States was considering construction of a memorial to Thomas Jefferson, as part of recognizing inspirational leaders. (Eventually the Jefferson Memorial was built at the Tidal Basin in Washington, D.C.) Smith said that while riding a train back to St. Louis from a meeting on the Clark memorial, he was inspired by thinking that the Jefferson memorial should be placed on historic property in St. Louis where the expansion to the west had occurred. Building a memorial would provide an excuse to improve what had become a dowdy waterfront since the decline in passenger riverboats and some freight river traffic.

Smith pitched the idea to Mayor Bernard Dickmann. The two pitched the idea again to civic leaders. Smith was appointed by the mayor as the chairman of the committee to investigate further. The committee was developed as the Jefferson National Expansion Memorial Association and was formally chartered in April 1934. Smith served as its chairman for every year except one until 1949, after the Association's selection of the design for the Gateway Arch by Eero Saarinen following a design competition.

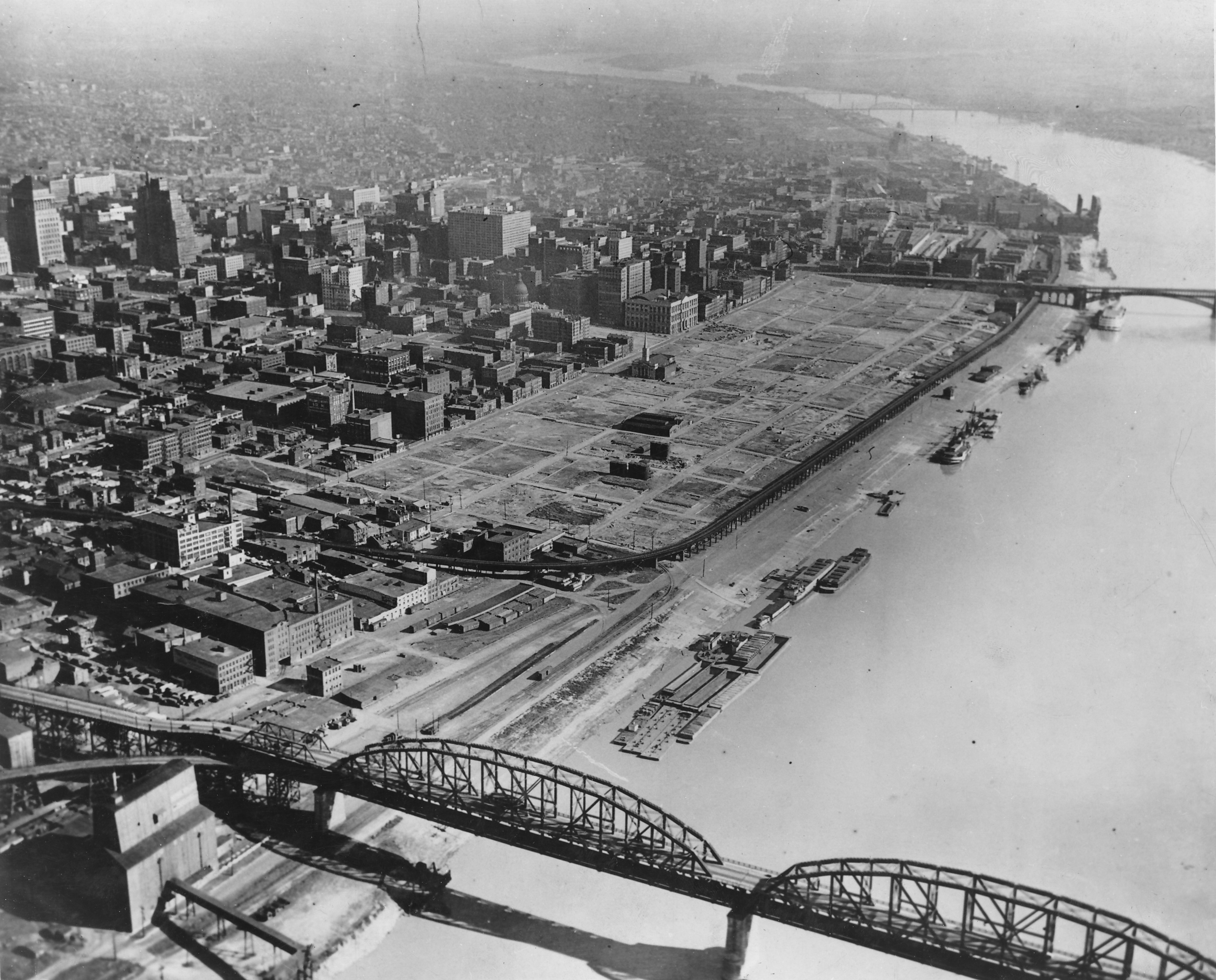
40 blocks and 486 buildings were demolished

The original plan called for the Arch project to be jointly financed by the federal government and city of St. Louis, with the intention of revitalizing the historic heart of the city. The proposed project required clearing 40 blocks in the heart of St. Louis, which were mostly outdated old buildings, which had not yet been designated as of historic interest. The total costs were expected to be $30 million, an amount that was greeted by considerable opposition. However, voters on September 10, 1935, approved a $7.5 million bond issue for the project. President Franklin D. Roosevelt signed an executive order on December 21, 1935, authorizing the Department of Interior to acquire and develop the memorial.

The federal government acquired the property via condemnation rather than negotiated sales. Court cases as owners challenged condemnation delayed the process. But the entire 90-acre (360,000 m^{2}) site was cleared by May 1942.

Further work was delayed due to priority needs of World War II. In 1941 Smith chaired a state organizational committee to develop the Missouri Plan, which promoted non-partisan selection of judges.

During the war, Smith was asked about his vision for the Gateway site. He said there should be "a central figure, a shaft, a building, an arch, or something which would symbolize American culture and civilization."

In 1946 Smith worked to raise $225,000 for an architecture design contest for the Memorial, to attract the best talents in the international field. He personally donated $40,000 of the amount.

In 1948 he wrote to contest winner Eero Saarinen, an architect from Finland:

It was your design, your marvelous conception, your brilliant forecast into the future, that has made the realization of the dream possible – a dream that you and the wonderful genius at your command and the able assistance of your associates are going to achieve far beyond the remotest possibility that we had dared visualize in the beginning.

Smith died in 1951; the Arch construction began in 1963. He was buried at historic Bellefontaine Cemetery in north St. Louis. The Arch was completed in 1965. In 2018, the park was renamed as the Gateway Arch National Park.
