= Old Courthouse (St. Louis) =

Old Courthouse, National Park Service site at Gateway Arch National Park
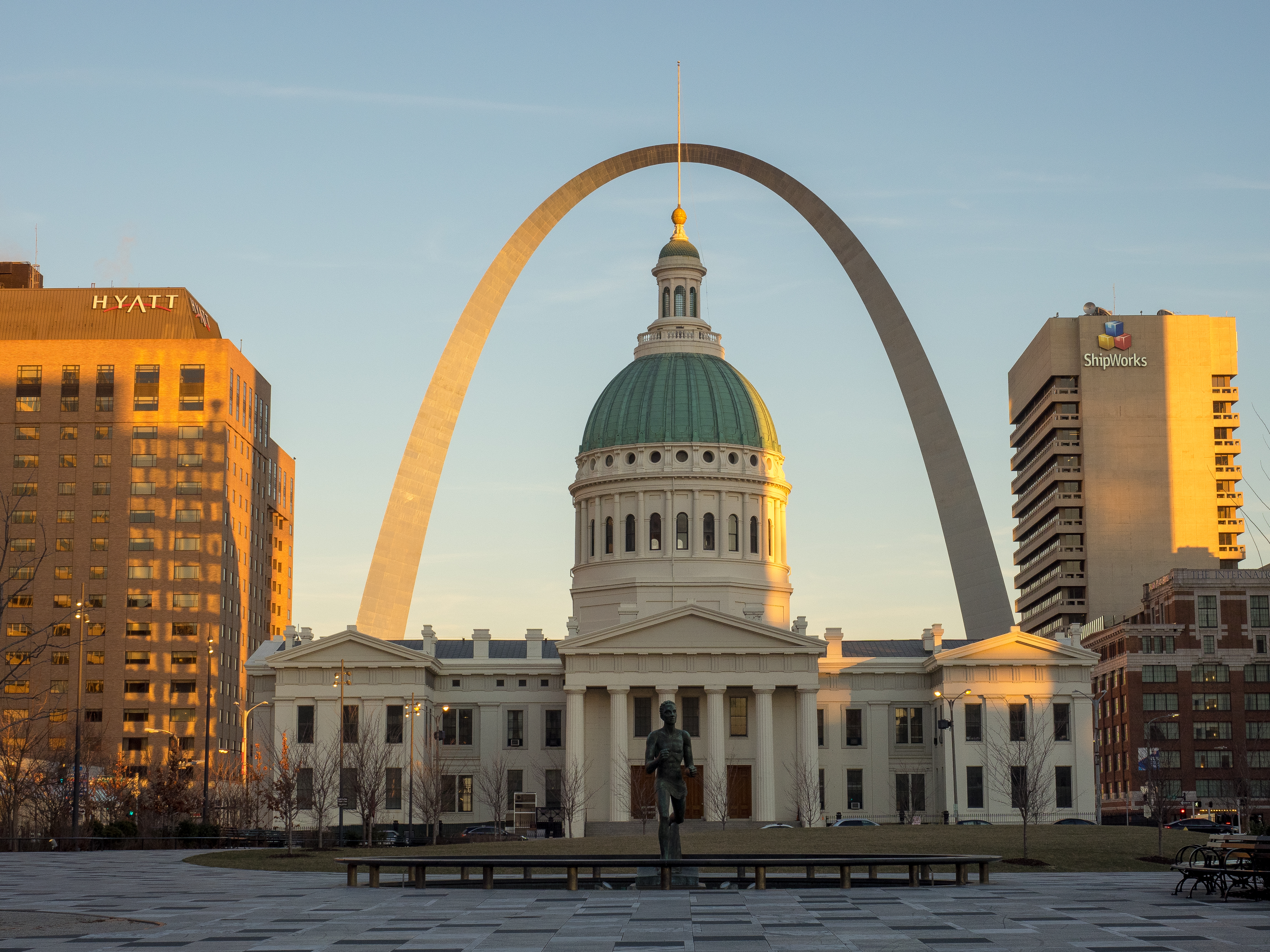

General information
- Type: Museum
- Location: St. Louis, Missouri
- Coordinates: 38°37′33″N 90°11′21″W
- Construction started: 1816
- Completed: 1864
- Owner: Gateway Arch National Park

Height
- Roof: 192 ft (59 m)

Design and construction
- Architects: Henry Singleton (1839 renovation); Robert S. Mitchell (1851 renovation); William Rumbold (1864 dome)

Other information
- Public transit: MetroBus; Red Blue; At 8th & Pine station

References
- Old Courthouse
- U.S. Historic district – Contributing property
- St. Louis Landmark
- Location within St. Louis Location within Missouri Location within the United States
- Location: St. Louis, Missouri
- Built: 1828
- Part of: Gateway Arch National Historic Site (ID66000941)
- Added to NRHP: October 15, 1966

The Old St. Louis County Courthouse was built as a combination federal and state courthouse in St. Louis, Missouri, United States. Missouri's tallest habitable building from 1864 to 1894, it is now part of Gateway Arch National Park and operated by the National Park Service for historical exhibits and events.

== History ==
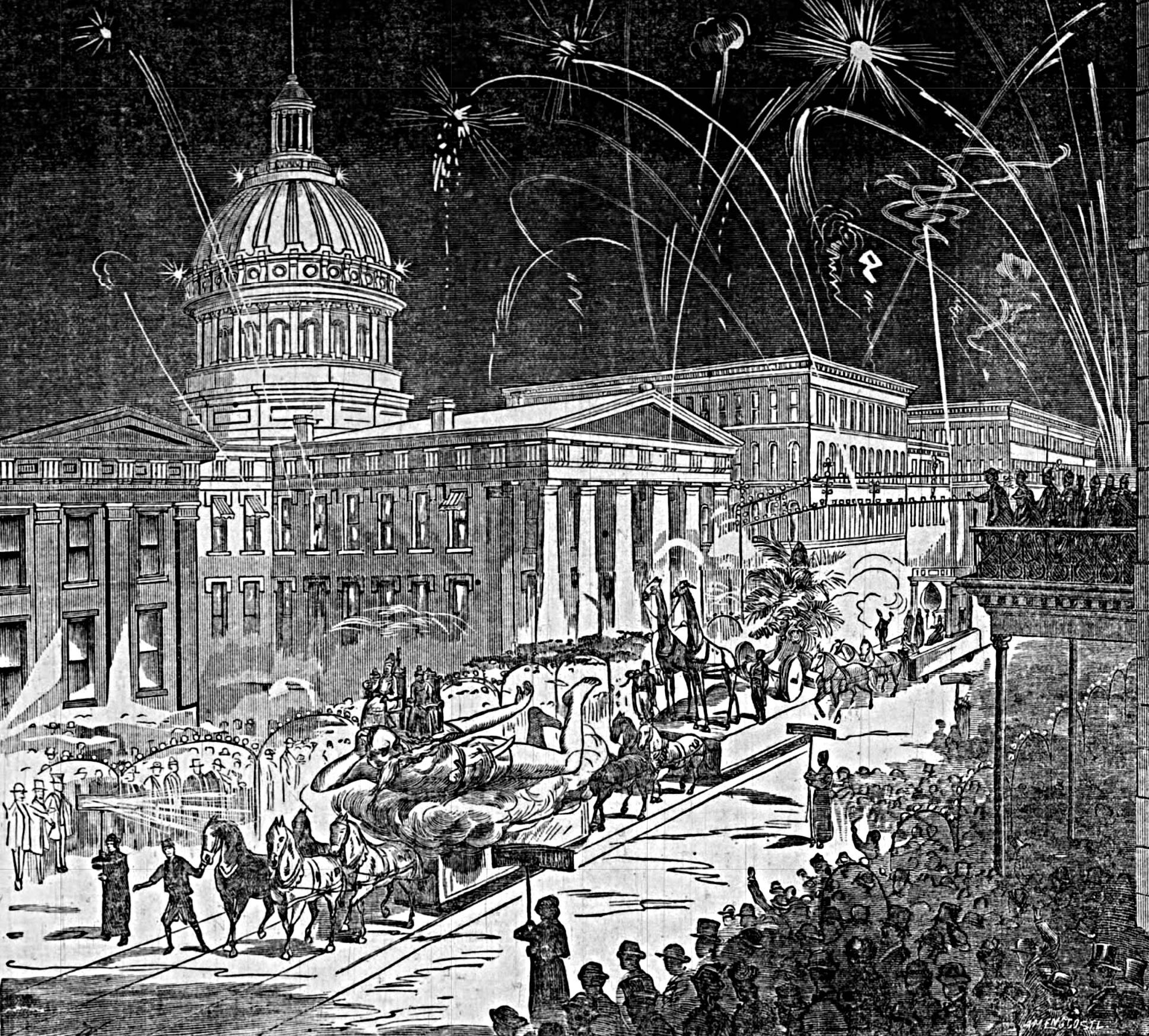
1885 Veiled Prophet Parade passing in front of the Old Courthouse

Land for the courthouse was donated in 1816 by Judge John Baptiste Charles Lucas and St. Louis founder Auguste Chouteau. Lucas and Chouteau required the land be "used forever as the site on which the courthouse of the County of St. Louis should be erected." The Federal style courthouse was completed in 1828.

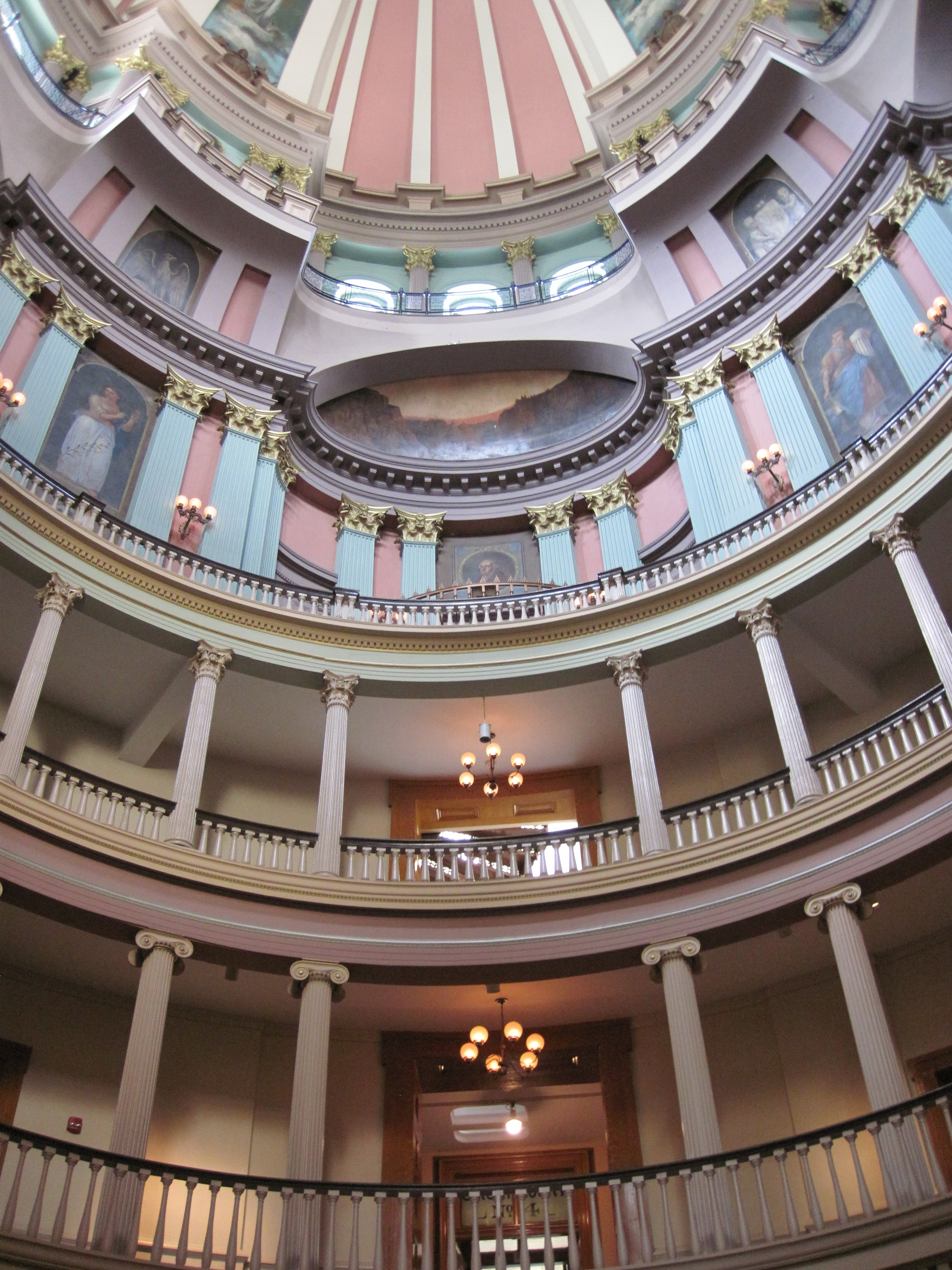
Interior of the courthouse rotunda

It was designed by the firm of Laveille & Morton, which also designed the early buildings at Jefferson Barracks as well as the Old Cathedral. Laveille & Morton was the first architecture firm west of the Mississippi River above New Orleans. As street commissioner in 1823–26, Joseph C. Laveille devised the city's street name grid, with ordinal numbers for north–south streets and arboreal names for east–west streets.

Missouri became a state in 1821, and the St. Louis population tripled in 10 years. A new courthouse was soon needed. In 1839, ground was broken on a courthouse designed by Henry Singleton in the Greek Revival style, with four wings, including an east wing that comprised the original courthouse and a three-story cupola dome at the center.

In 1851, Robert S. Mitchell began a redesign of the courthouse in which the east wing was torn down and replaced. From 1855 to 1858, the west wing was remodeled. The famous Dred Scott citizenship case was heard in the west wing before the remodeling.

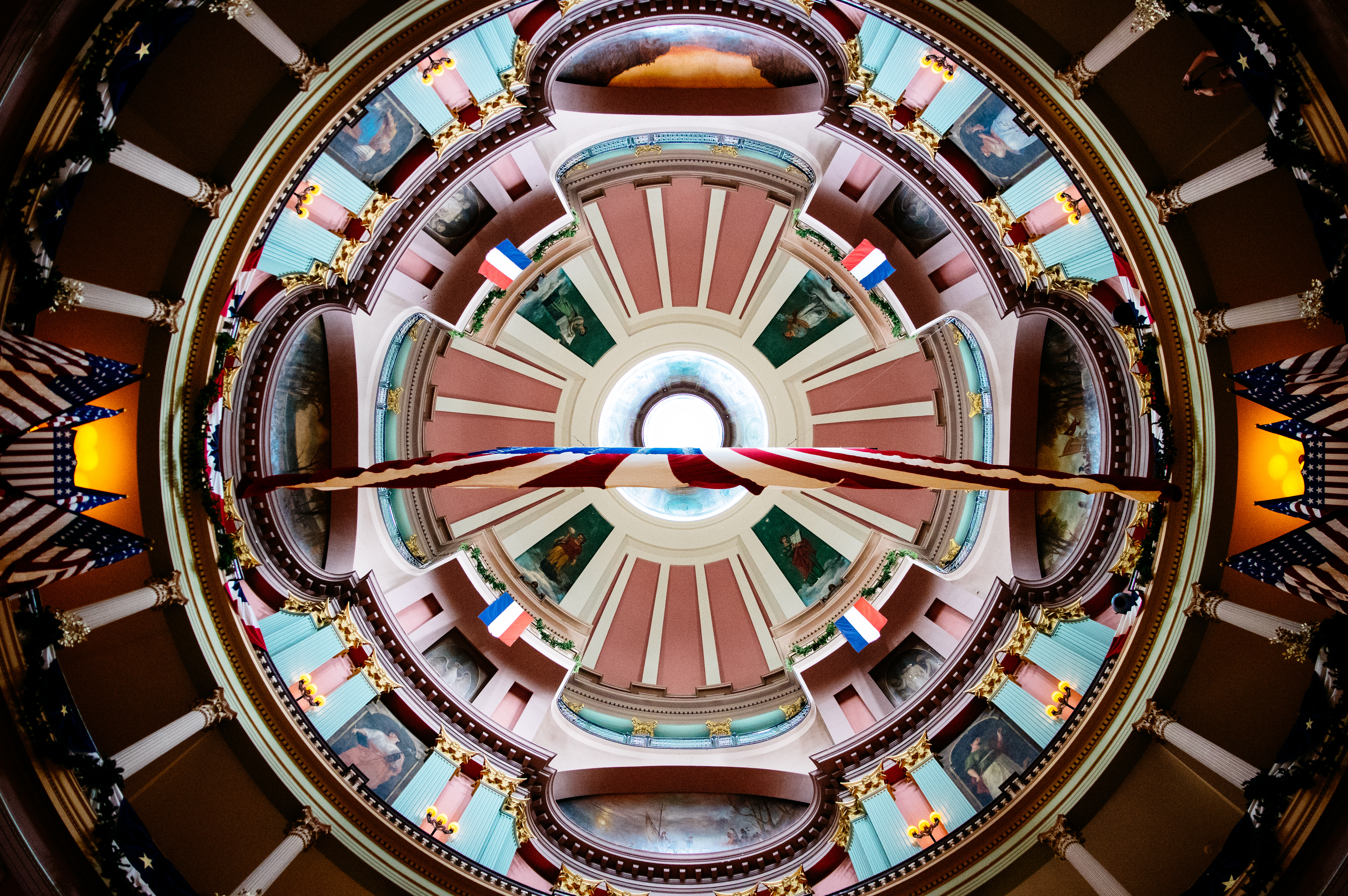
Interior dome of the Old Courthouse

In 1861, William Rumbold replaced the cupola with an Italian Renaissance cast iron dome modeled on St. Peter's Basilica in Vatican City. The United States Capitol dome, built at the same time during the American Civil War, is also modeled on the basilica. The St. Louis dome was completed in 1864, and Karl Ferdinand Wimar was commissioned to paint murals, which are featured in the rotunda.

The last slave auction held at the Old Courthouse took place in 1861. Slave auctions were held in the Probate Courts of the Old Courthouse near the East Door. The Court ordered sales of slaves whose owners had died without a will or had declared bankruptcy. This was common practice in all Missouri courthouses.

Rumbold's dome in the courthouse is wrought and cast iron with a copper exterior. Four lunettes in the dome have paintings by Carl Wimar, depicting four events in St. Louis history. Ettore Miragoli painted over them in 1880, but they were restored in 1888.

Louis Brandeis was admitted to the bar in the Old Courthouse, in 1878.

When St. Louis County, Missouri and the city split in 1877, the courthouse became city property. The courthouse was abandoned by the city in 1930 after it built the Civil Courts Building, and descendants of Chouteau and Lucas sued to regain ownership. In 1935, during the Great Depression, St. Louis voted for a bond issue to raze nearly 40 blocks around the courthouse in the center of St. Louis for the new Gateway Arch National Park, which was then known as Jefferson National Expansion Memorial. President Franklin Roosevelt declared in an Executive Order the area would be a national monument and landscape design, sidewalks and other infrastructure was added. The courthouse formally became part of the new monument area in 1940. Replaced in 1941, the roof was renovated in 1955, 1985 and 2010. The National Park Service maintains four history galleries on St. Louis and NPS offices within. The courthouse once had up to 12 courtrooms, but now there are two in period presentation. The east wing has Circuit Court #13 restored to its 1910 appearance, while the west wing has Circuit Court #4 restored to an approximate 1850s detail.

The courthouse building was the tallest building in Missouri and St. Louis until 1896 when Union Station was built. It remained the largest structure in the national monument until the Gateway Arch was built in 1965.

== Notable cases ==
- In 1846 the slave Dred Scott sued for his and his wife's freedom as they had been held as slaves in free states. All of the trials, including a Missouri Supreme Court hearing, were held in the Old Courthouse. The case was ultimately decided by the U.S. Supreme Court in 1857 Dred Scott v. Sandford, which ruled against the Scotts, saying they did not have grounds as citizens to sue.
- In 1872 Virginia Minor attempted to vote in a St. Louis election and was arrested. Her trials, including the deliberations before the Missouri Supreme Court, were held in this building. The United States Supreme Court in Minor v. Happersett (1875) upheld the male-only voting rules, as the Constitution did not address voting rules, which were set by the states.

== In popular culture ==
- In Season 3 of the TV series The Last Ship, the Old Courthouse becomes the new White House and the base of operations for the reformed United States government in the post-plague days of the Red Flu.
- The courthouse is destroyed in the disaster films Supernova and The Black Hole.
- The Old Courthouse is featured on many of St. Louis's architectural tours.

== Gallery ==
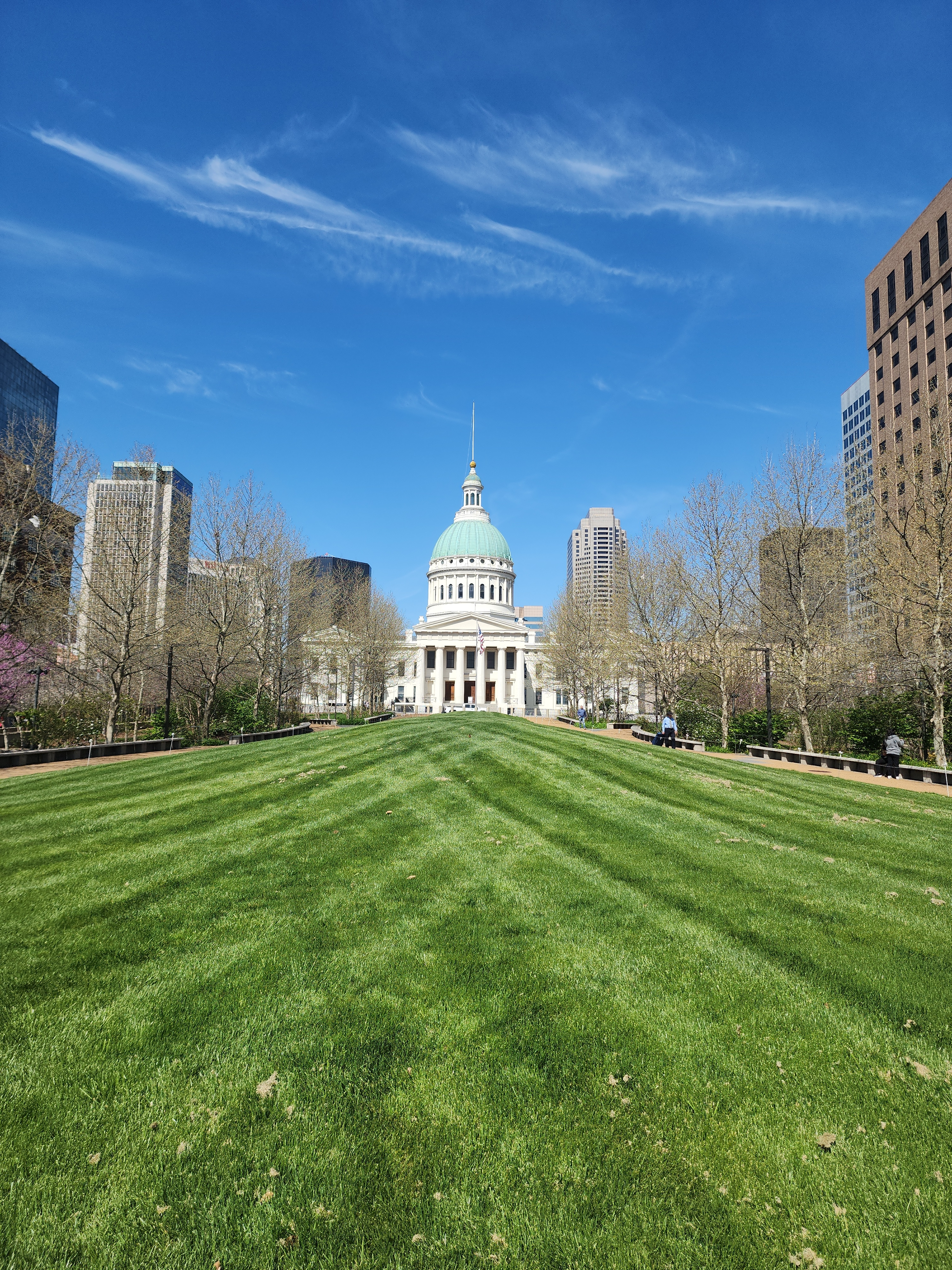
The old courthouse of St. Louis, as seen from the entrance to the Gateway Arch.

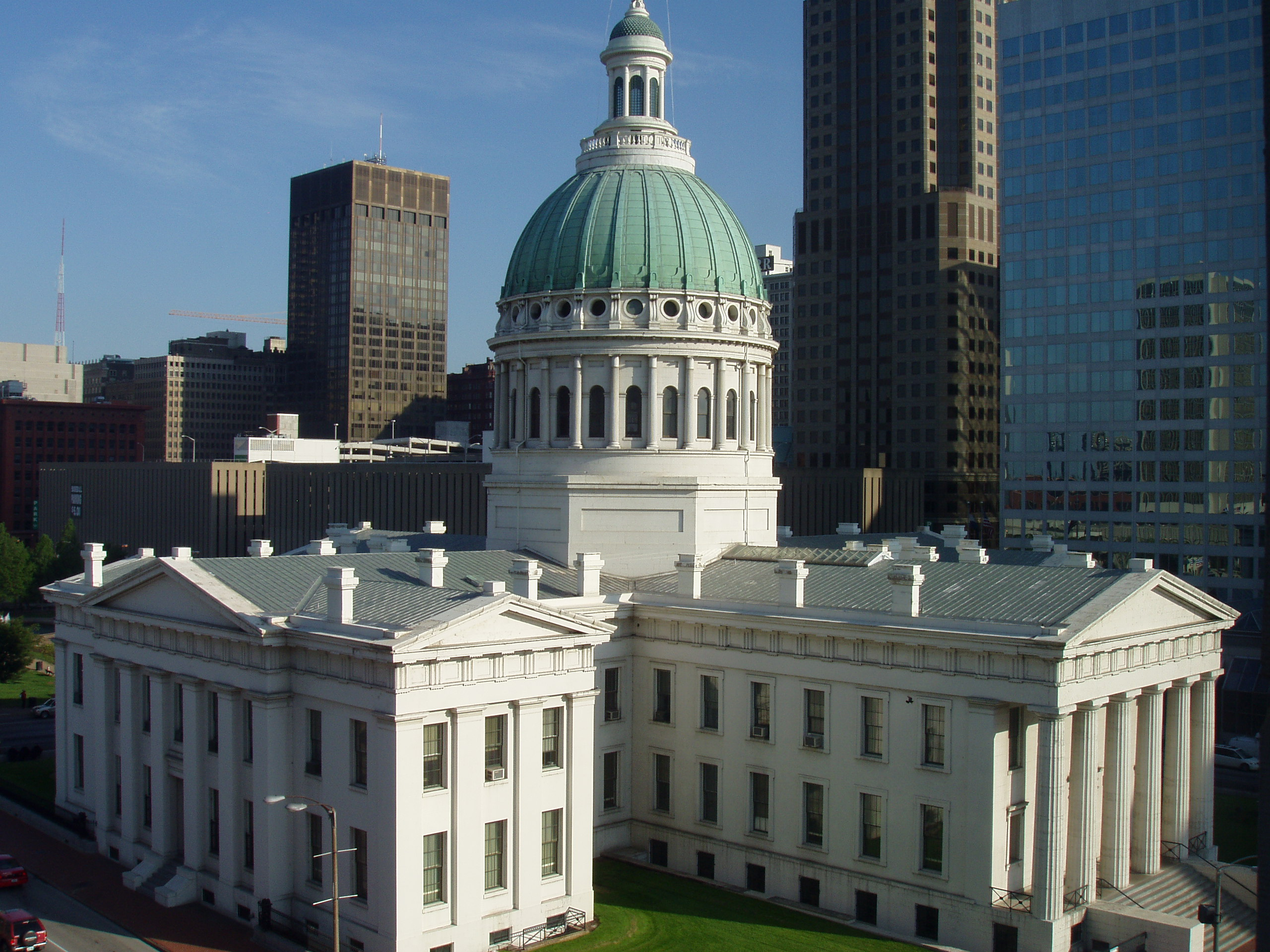

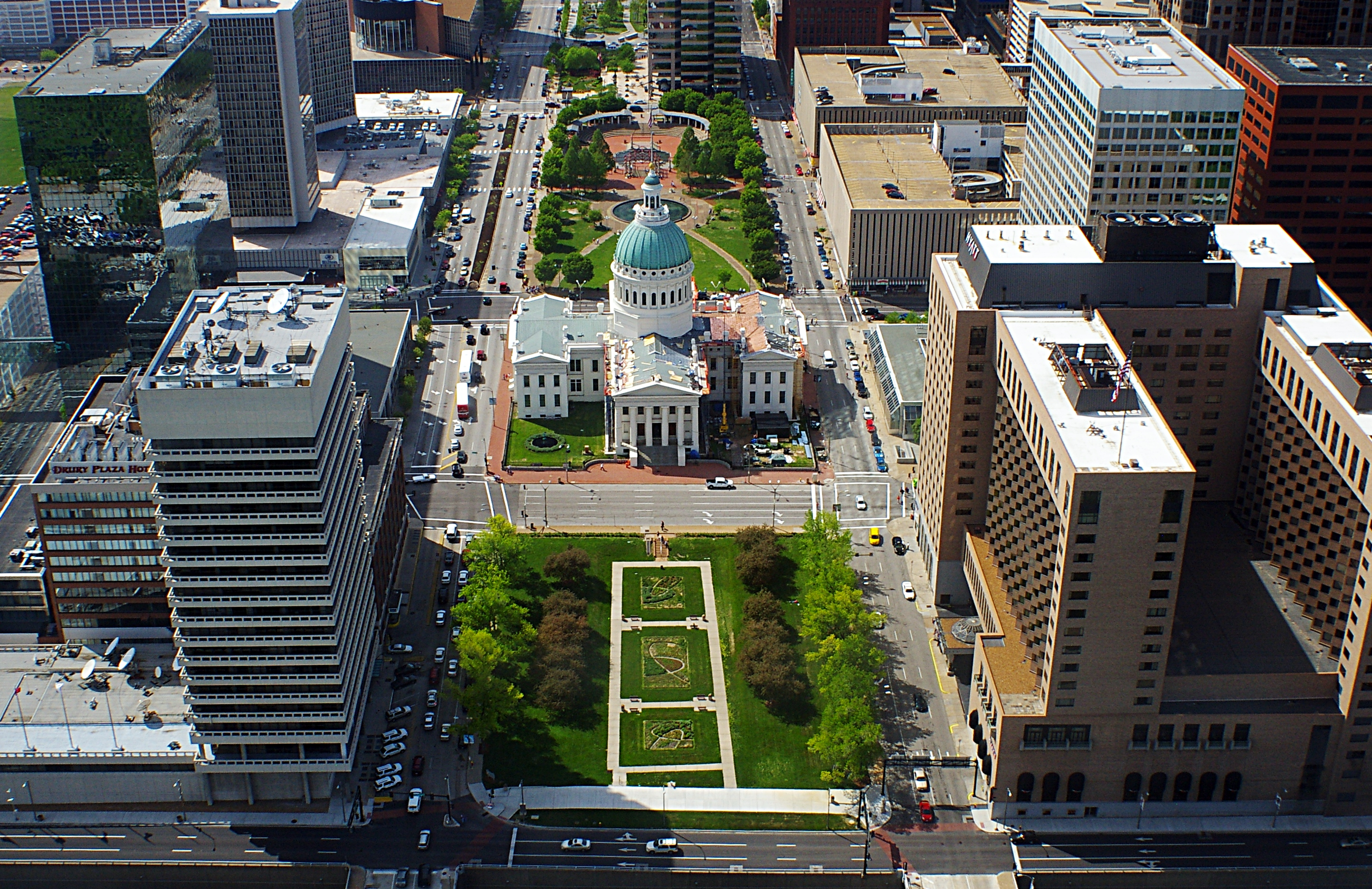
Seen from the top of the Gateway Arch

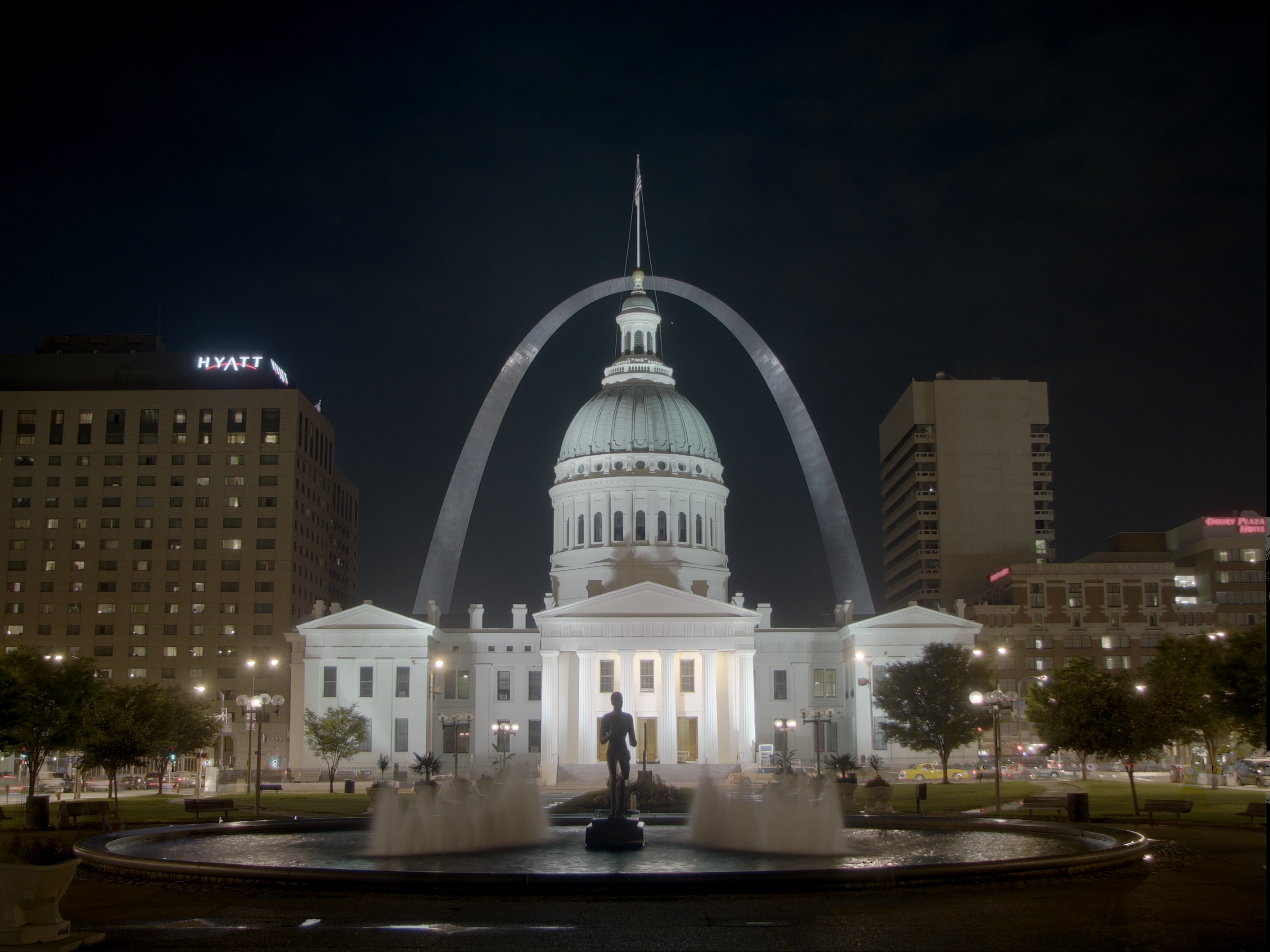

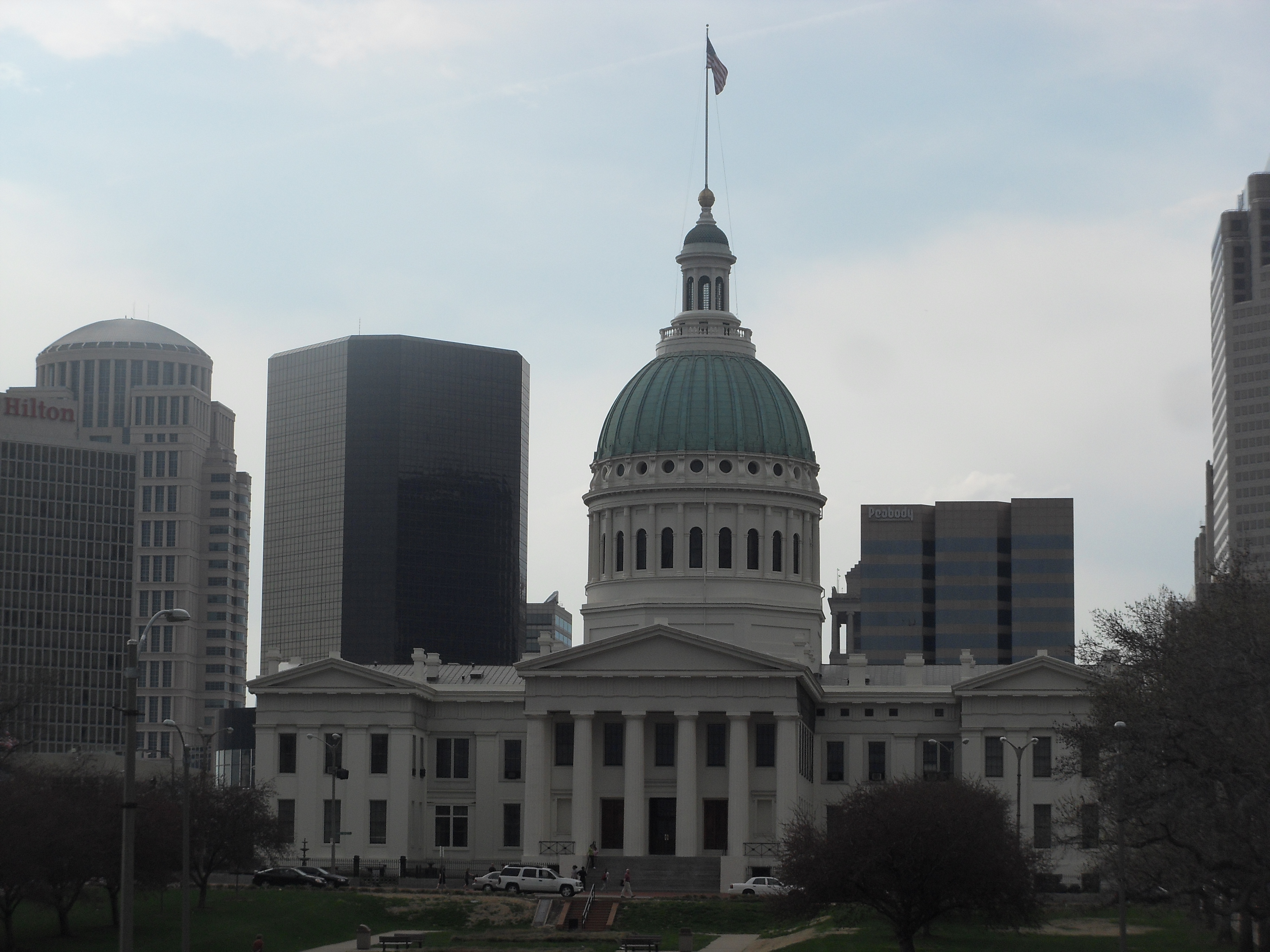

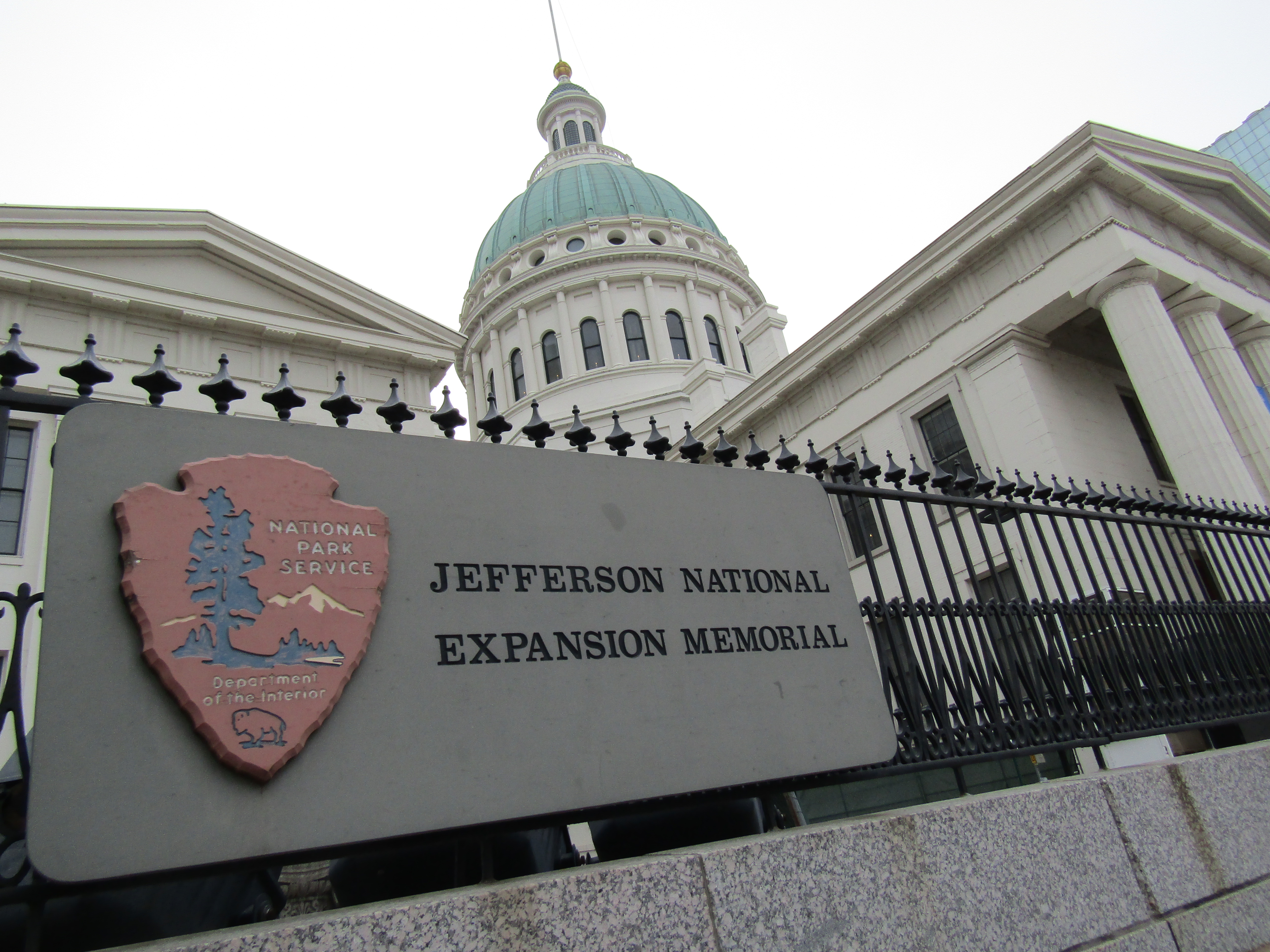
park entrance sign

== See also ==
- List of the oldest buildings in the United States
- Architecture of St. Louis
