= Gateway Arch National Park =

U.S. national park in St. Louis, Missouri

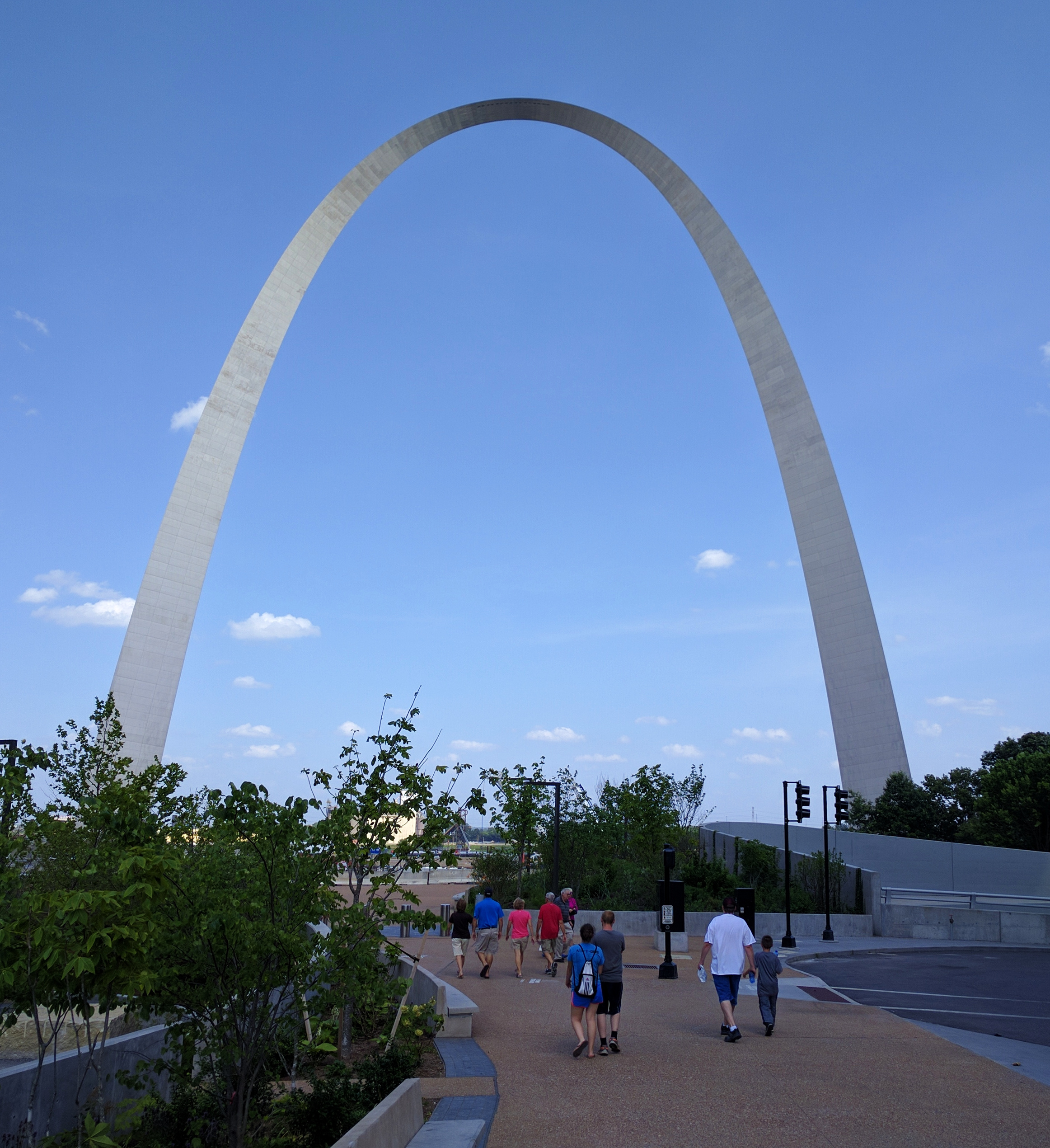
- The Gateway Arch serves as the attraction's centerpiece.
- Interactive map of Gateway Arch National Park
- Location: St. Louis, Missouri, United States
- Coordinates: 38°37′29″N 90°11′06″W
- Area: 91 acres (37 ha)
- Established: February 22, 2018; 8 years ago
- Visitors: 1,163,016 (in 2024)
- Governing body: National Park Service
- Website: nps.gov/jeff
- Gateway Arch National Park
- U.S. National Register of Historic Places
- U.S. Historic district
- Location within St. Louis Location within Missouri Location within the United States
- Location: Mississippi River between Washington and Poplar Sts., St. Louis, Missouri
- Area: 91 acres (37 ha)
- Built: 1831–34 Old Cathedral; 1839–64 Old Courthouse; 1962–65 Gateway Arch
- NRHP reference No.: 66000941
- Added to NRHP: October 15, 1966

Gateway Arch National Park is a national park of the United States located in St. Louis, Missouri, near the starting point of the Lewis and Clark Expedition.

In its initial form as a national memorial, it was established in 1935 to commemorate:

- the Louisiana Purchase and subsequent westward movement of American explorers and pioneers;
- the first civil government west of the Mississippi River; and
- the debate over slavery raised by the Dred Scott case.

The national park consists of the Gateway Arch, a steel catenary arch that has become the definitive icon of St. Louis; a park along the Mississippi River on the site of the earliest buildings of the city; the Old Courthouse, a former state and federal courthouse where the Dred Scott case originated; and the 140,000 sq ft (13,000 m^{2}) museum at the Gateway Arch. It is the smallest national park in the United States at 91 acres (37 ha), less than 2% the size of the next-smallest, Hot Springs National Park.

The immediate surroundings of the Gateway Arch were initially designated the Jefferson National Expansion Memorial by secretarial order on December 21, 1935. The Gateway Arch was completed on October 28, 1965. The park is maintained by the National Park Service (NPS).

The area surrounding the arch was redesignated as the Gateway Arch National Park in 2018. This change has been controversial due to the nature of the site (national parks typically include conserved natural landscapes and significant opportunities for nature recreation, whereas sites that have primarily historical and architectural significance are usually given other NPS designations). Several publications noted that the addition of Gateway Arch as a national park eroded the significance associated with the "national park" designation, and some suggested that the change was made in order to promote tourism rather than to conserve a nature area.

== Components ==
=== The Gateway Arch ===
The Gateway Arch, known as the "Gateway to the West," is the tallest monument in the United States. It was designed by the Finnish-American architect Eero Saarinen and the German-American structural engineer Hannskarl Bandel in 1947 and built between 1963 and October 1965. It stands 630 feet (192 m) tall and 630 feet (192 m) wide at its base. The legs are 54 feet (16.5 m) wide at the base, narrowing to 17 feet (5.2 m) at the arch. There is a unique tram system to carry passengers to the observation room at the top of the arch.

=== Old Courthouse ===
The Old Courthouse is built on land originally deeded by St. Louis founder Auguste Chouteau. It marks the location over which the arch reaches. Its dome was built during the American Civil War and is similar to the dome on the United States Capitol which was also built during the Civil War. It was the site of the local trials in the Dred Scott case.

The courthouse is the only portion of the memorial west of Interstate 44. To the west of the Old Courthouse is the Gateway Mall between Market and Chestnut Streets which is only interrupted by the Civil Courts Building which features a pyramid model of the Mausoleum of Mausolus (which was one of the Seven Wonders of the Ancient World) on its roof. When the Civil Courts building was built in the 1920s, the Chouteau family sued to regain the property belonging to the Old Courthouse because it had been deeded in perpetuity to be a courthouse.

=== Museum at the Gateway Arch ===
Underneath the arch is a visitor center, entered from a circular entryway facing the Old Courthouse. Within the center, a project to rebuild the Museum at the Gateway Arch was completed in July 2018. The new museum features exhibits on a variety of topics including westward expansion and the construction of the Arch, all told through a St. Louis lens. Tucker Theater, finished in 1968 and renovated 30 years later, has about 285 seats and shows a documentary (Monument to the Dream) on the arch's construction. A second theater was added in 1993 but removed in 2018 as part of the CityArchRiver renovation project. Also located in the visitor center are a gift shop and cafe.

== History ==
=== 1930s ===
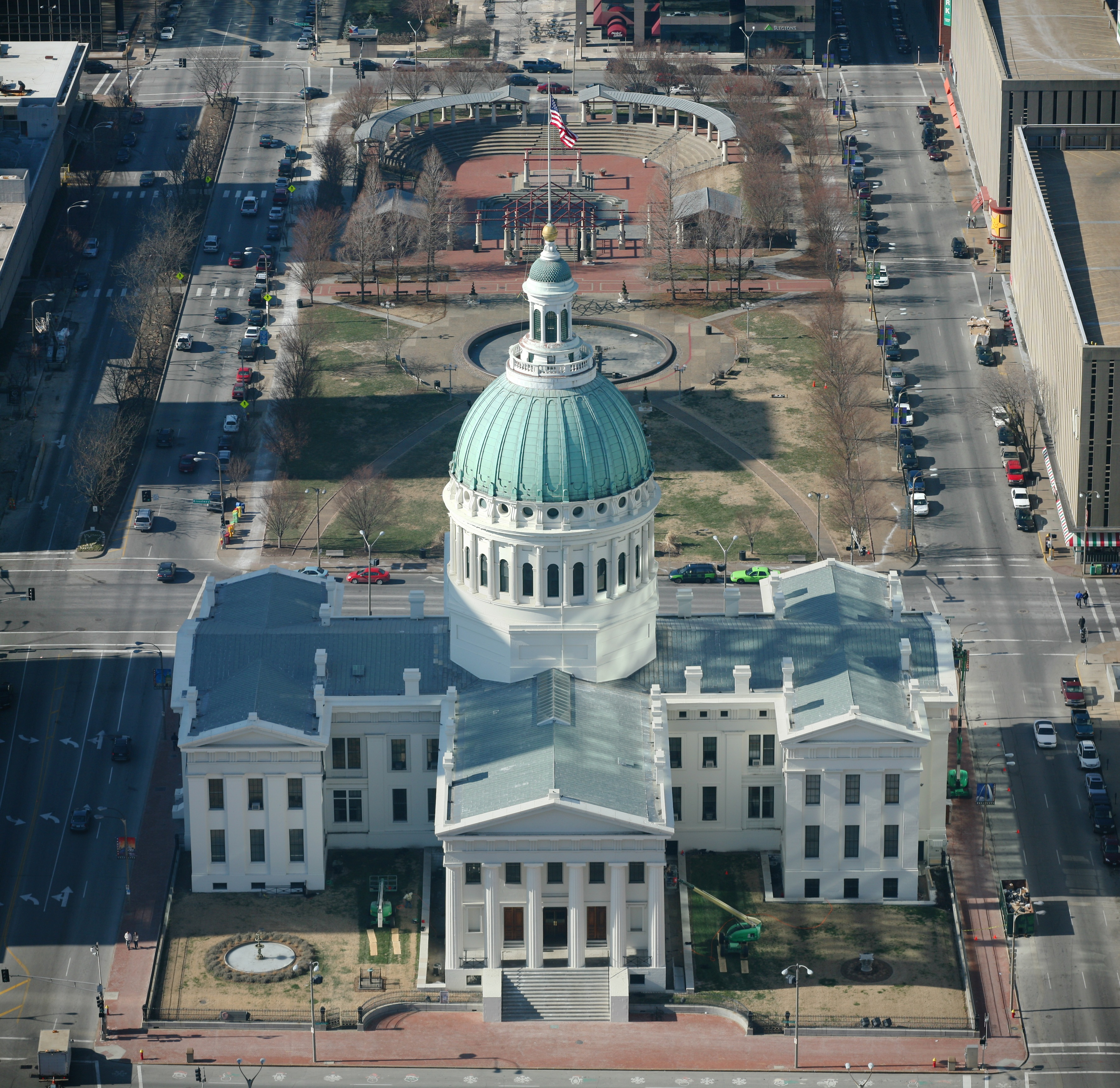
The Old Courthouse from the observation area at the top of the arch

The memorial was developed largely through the efforts of St. Louis civic booster Luther Ely Smith who first pitched the idea in 1933, was the long-term chairman of the committee that selected the area and persuaded Franklin Roosevelt in 1935 to make it a National Park Service unit after St. Louis passed a bond issue to begin building it and who partially financed the 1947 architectural contest that selected the arch.

In the early 1930s the United States began looking for a suitable memorial for Thomas Jefferson (the Washington Monument and the newly built Lincoln Memorial were the only large Presidential memorials at the time).

Shortly after Thanksgiving in 1933 Smith who had been on the commission to build the George Rogers Clark National Historical Park in Indiana, was returning via train when he noticed the poor condition of the original platted location of St. Louis along the Mississippi. He thought that the memorial to Jefferson should be on the actual location that was symbolic of one of Jefferson's greatest triumphs—the Louisiana Purchase.

The originally platted area of St. Louis was the site of:

- The Battle of St. Louis, the only battle west of the Mississippi River in the American Revolutionary War.
- The first capital of Upper Louisiana for the United States, the Louisiana Purchase north of the 33rd parallel that was the original Louisiana Territory in 1803.
- The Three Flags Day ceremony in 1804 in which Spain formally turned over Louisiana to France, less than 24 hours before France then officially turned it over to the United States. This technically completed the Louisiana Purchase, and also cleared the way for Meriwether Lewis and William Clark to legally begin their exploration of the continental west, which Spain had prohibited.

Almost all of the historic buildings associated with this period had been replaced by newer buildings. His idea was to raze all of the buildings in the original St. Louis platted area and replace it with a park with "a central feature, a shaft, a building, an arch, or something which would symbolize American culture and civilization."

Smith pitched the idea to Bernard Dickmann who quickly assembled a meeting of St. Louis civic leaders on December 15, 1933, at the Jefferson Hotel and they endorsed the plan and Smith became chairman of what would become the Jefferson National Expansion Memorial Association (a position he would hold until 1949 with a one-year exception).

The Commission then defined the area, got cost estimates of $30 million to buy the land, clear the buildings and erect a park and monument. With promises from the federal government (via the United States Territorial Expansion Memorial Commission) to join if the City of St. Louis could raise money.

The area to be included in the park was bounded by the Eads Bridge/Washington Avenue on the north and Poplar Street on the south, the Mississippi River on the east and Third Street (now Interstate 44) on the west. The Old Courthouse, just west of Third Street, was added in 1940.

The only building in this area not included was the Old Cathedral, which is on the site of St. Louis first church and was opposite the home of St. Louis founder Auguste Chouteau. The founders of the city were buried in its graveyard (but were moved in 1849 to Bellefontaine Cemetery during a cholera outbreak).

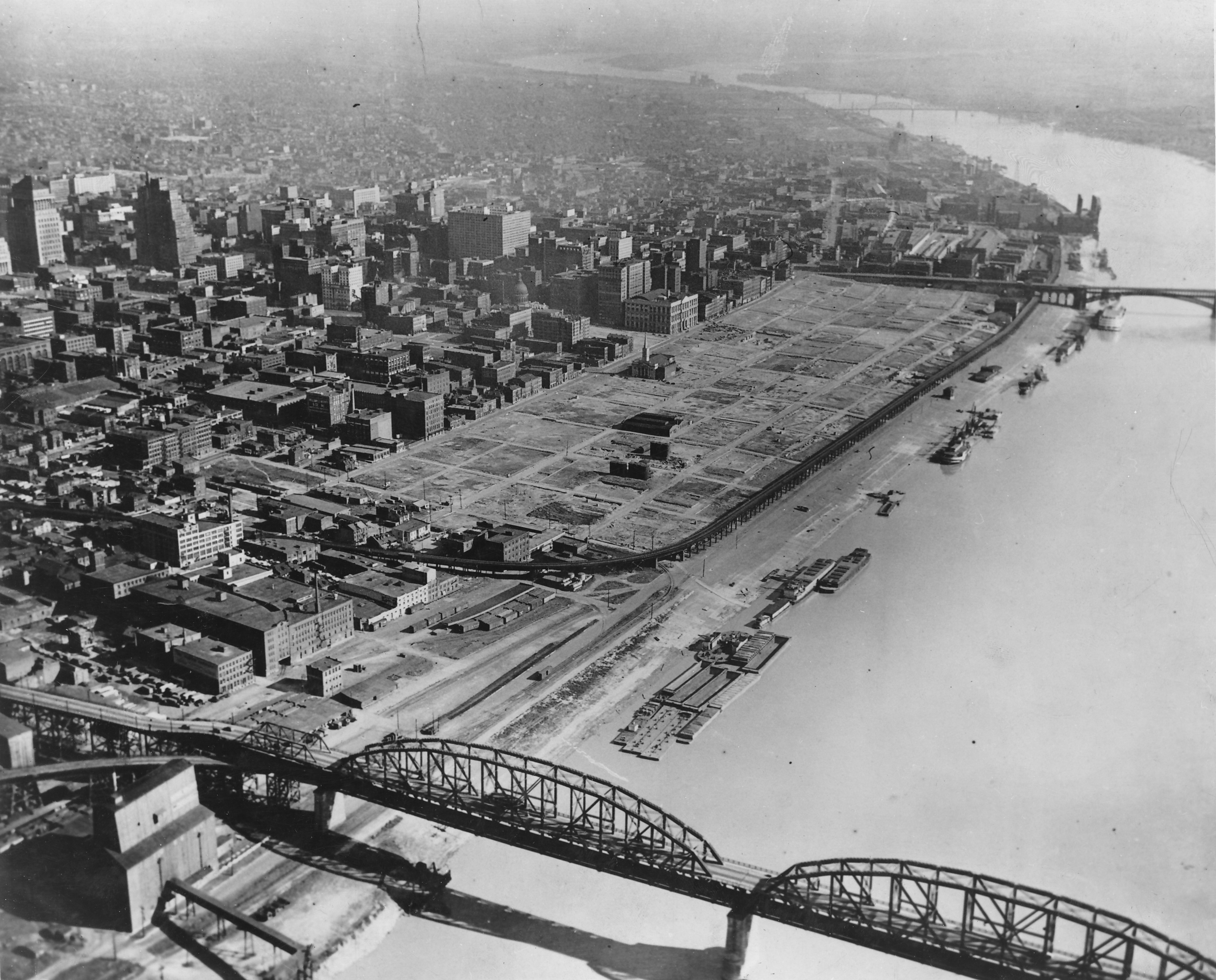
40 blocks and 486 buildings were demolished

Taking away 40 blocks in the center of St. Louis was bitterly fought by some sources—particularly the St. Louis Post-Dispatch. On September 10, 1935, the voters of St. Louis supposedly approved a $7.5 million bond issue to buy the property. Local architect Louis LaBeaume provided a preliminary design proposal for the site that included multiple museums, fountains and obelisks. Soon after, it was revealed that the election was rigged, and the true number of voters in favor of the demolition of the riverfront is unknown.

The buildings were bought for $7 million by the federal government via eminent domain and was subject to considerable litigation but were ultimately bought at 131.99 percent of assessed valuation. Roosevelt inspected the memorial area on October 14, 1936, during the dedication of the St. Louis Soldiers Memorial. Included in the party was then Senator Harry S. Truman.

=== 1940s to 1960s ===
The land was to be cleared by 1942. Among the buildings razed was the "Old Rock House" 1818 home of fur trader Manuel Lisa (now occupied by the stairs on the north side of the arch) and the 1819 home of original St. Louis pioneer Jean Pierre Chouteau at First (Main) and Washington streets.

The architectural competition for a monument was delayed by World War II. Interest in the monument was fed after the war as it was to be the first big monument in the post-World War II era. The estimated cost of the competition was $225,000 and Smith personally donated $40,000. Civic leaders held the nationwide competition in 1947 to select a design for the main portion of the Memorial space.

Architect Eero Saarinen won this competition with plans for a 590-foot (180 m) catenary arch to be placed on the banks of the Mississippi River. However, these plans were modified over the next 15 years, placing the arch on higher ground and adding 40 feet (12 m) in height and width.

The central architectural feature at the base of the arch is the Old Courthouse, which was once the tallest building in Missouri and has a dome similar to the United States Capitol and was placed on the building during the American Civil War at the same time as that on the U.S. Capitol.

Saarinen developed the shape with the help of architectural engineer Hannskarl Bandel. It is not a pure inverted catenary. Saarinen preferred a shape that was slightly elongated and thinner towards the top, a shape that produces a subtle soaring effect, and transfers more of the structure's weight downward rather than outward at the base.

When Saarinen won the competition, the official notification was sent to "E. Saarinen", thinking it to be the architect's father Eliel Saarinen, who had also submitted an entry. The family celebrated with a bottle of champagne, and two hours later an embarrassed official called to say the winner was, in fact, the younger Saarinen. The elder Saarinen then broke out a second bottle of champagne to celebrate his son's success.

Among the five finalists was local St. Louis architect Harris Armstrong.

Land for the memorial was formally dedicated on June 10, 1950, by Harry S. Truman. However, the Korean War began and the project was put on hold.

On June 23, 1959, work began on covering railroad tracks that cut across the memorial grounds.

On February 11, 1961, excavation began, and that September 1, Saarinen died. On February 12, 1963, the first stainless steel triangle that formed the first section of the arch was set in place on the south leg. On July 14, 1964, Percy Green and Richard Daly, members of the local chapter of the Congress of Racial Equality, climbed halfway up a leg of the Arch to protest unfair hiring practices. They aimed to draw attention to the lack of African American contractors on the suppossedly integrated job site. After four hours, they were brought down and arrested, after which Green bonded out in order to make his nigh shift at McDonnell Douglass. On October 28, 1965, it was completed, costing approximately $15 million to build. The adjacent park was designed by landscape architect Dan Kiley. Along with all other historical areas of the National Park Service, the memorial was listed on the National Register of Historic Places on October 15, 1966. Vice President Hubert Humphrey and Secretary of the Interior Stewart Udall dedicated the arch on May 25, 1968.

=== 1970s to 2000s ===
In 1984, Congress authorized the enlargement of the Memorial to include up to 100 acres (40 ha) on the east bank of the Mississippi River in East St. Louis, Illinois. Funds were authorized to begin land acquisition, but Congress placed a moratorium upon NPS land acquisitions in fiscal year 1998. The moratorium continued into the 21st century, with expansion becoming less likely because of the construction of a riverboat gambling facility and related amenities. In 2026 legislators introduced a bill in Congress that would add Malcolm W. Martin Memorial Park, owned by the Metro East Park and Recreation District, and some surrounding land to the national park.

During the Great Flood of 1993, Mississippi flood waters reached halfway up the Grand Staircase on the east.

In 1999, the arch tram queue areas were renovated at a cost of about $2.2 million. As well, the Ulysses S. Grant National Historic Site in St. Louis County, Missouri, was put under the jurisdiction of the Superintendent of the Memorial.

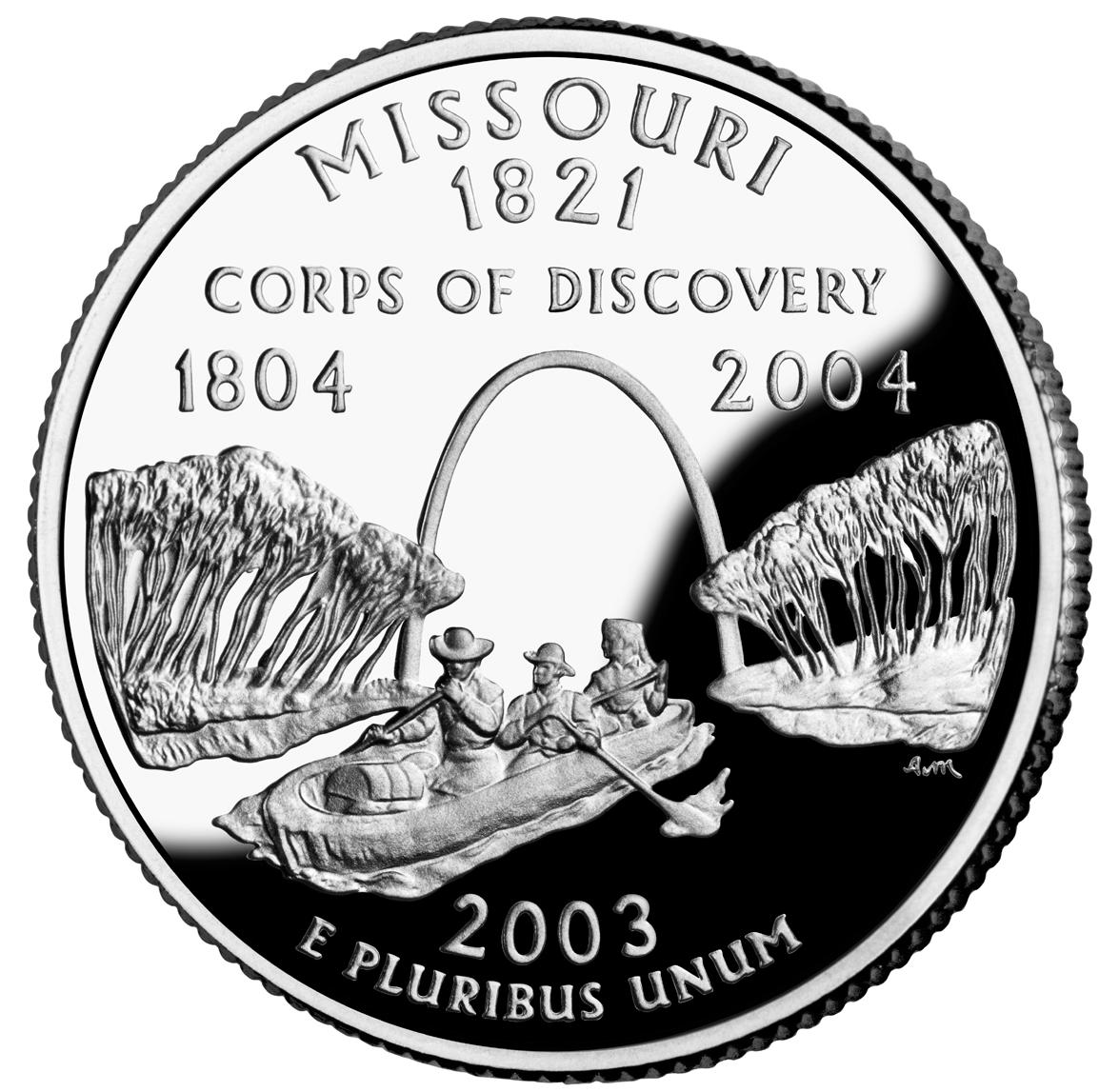
The Missouri state quarter depicting the Gateway Arch and the Lewis and Clark Expedition

The arch was featured on the Missouri state quarter in 2003.

In 2007 St. Louis Mayor Francis Slay and former Missouri Senator John Danforth asked the National Park Service to create a more "active" use of the grounds of the memorial and model it on Millennium Park in Chicago including the possibility of restaurants, fountains, ice skating, swimming, and other activities. The National Park Service was not in favor of the plan noting that the only other overt development pressure on national park property has been at the Jackson Hole Airport in Grand Teton National Park

=== 2010s to present ===
==== Renovations ====
On December 8, 2009, sponsored by nonprofit CityArchRiver2015, the international design competition "Framing a Modern Masterpiece: The City + The Arch + The River 2015" commenced. It aimed to "design a plan to improve the riverfront park landscape, ease access for pedestrians across Memorial Drive and expand onto the East St. Louis riverfront," as well as to attract visitors. The contest consisted of three stages—portfolio assessment (narrowed down to 8–10 teams), team interviews (narrowed down to 4–5 teams), and review of design proposals. The competition received 49 applicants, which were narrowed down to five in the first two stages. On August 17, 2010, the designs of the five finalists were revealed to the public and exhibited at the theater below the arch. On August 26, the finalists made their cases to an eight-member jury, and on September 21, Michael Van Valkenburgh Associates was selected as the winner. The initiative's plans included updating Kiener Plaza and the Old Courthouse, connecting the city to the Arch grounds with a park over Interstate 70, a re-imagined museum, and improved accessibility.

For most of its existence, the Memorial was largely separated from the rest of Downtown St. Louis by a sunken section of I-70 (later redesignated I-44). Ground broke on the "Park over the Highway" project, the first component of the CityArchRiver project, on August 2, 2013. This project features a landscaped structure over Interstate 70 and rerouted surface traffic that had previously formed a moat separating the Gateway Arch from the Old Courthouse. This project was completed in December 2014. In November 2015, Saarinen's original master plan was brought to fruition. Building of the Gateway Arch Connector linking the Old Courthouse with the grounds of the arch was completed. The project, originally planned for completion in 2015 to coincide with the 50th anniversary of the opening of the arch, was completed in 2018. It includes:

- replacing the north garage with an outdoor amphitheater, an explorers garden for children and an addition of 7.5 acres of green space.
- new cobblestone plaza between the arch and the river
- elevated walkways on the Illinois side, reaching 35 feet and winding through a new bird sanctuary, (Congress has authorized the purchase of the Illinois acreage)
- an expanded museum below the Gateway Arch with a new western entrance nearly a block closer to downtown than the original entrances.

In 2016, many ash trees on the grounds were removed to preempt damage from emerald ash borers. Prior to the work of CityArchRiver, there were 1,800 trees on the grounds. There are now 4,200.

The $380 million project was funded both privately and publicly. The public funding, provided largely by Proposition P, totaled $159 million. The remaining $221 million were secured via fundraising efforts of Gateway Arch Park foundation.

==== Redesignation ====
Gateway Arch National Park Designation Act
- Long title: An Act to redesignate the Jefferson National Expansion Memorial in the State of Missouri as the "Gateway Arch National Park".
- Enacted by: the 115th United States Congress
- Effective: February 22, 2018

Citations
- Public law: Pub. L. 115–128 (text) (PDF)
- Statutes at Large: 132 Stat. 328

Codification
- Titles amended: 16 U.S.C.: Conservation
- U.S.C. sections created: 16 U.S.C. § 450jj-10

Legislative history
- Introduced in the Senate as S. 1438 by Roy Blunt (R–MO) on June 26, 2017; Committee consideration by Senate Energy and Natural Resources; Passed the Senate on December 21, 2017 (voice vote); Passed the House on February 7, 2018 (voice vote); Signed into law by President Donald Trump on February 22, 2018

On June 26, 2017, Senator Roy Blunt (R-Missouri) introduced the Gateway Arch National Park Designation Act (Pub. L. 115–128 (text) (PDF)) to redesignate Jefferson National Expansion Memorial as Gateway Arch National Park. The legislation was cosponsored by Senator Claire McCaskill (D-Missouri).

In July 2017, Acting Deputy Director of the National Park Service Robert Vogel testified before the Senate Energy and Natural Resources Subcommittee on National Parks. Vogel stated that the Department of the Interior supported changing the name to Gateway Arch National Monument, rather than National Park, to maintain consistency with existing naming conventions. He likened the site to the Statue of Liberty National Monument, noting that existing national parks encompassed thousands of acres at minimum and that the memorial "is too small and limited in the range of resources the site protects and interprets to be called a national park".

The United States Congress approved the bill in early 2018. U.S. President Donald Trump signed the act into law on February 22, 2018, officially renaming the site Gateway Arch National Park.

The new designation has been seen as an attempt to increase tourism in St. Louis. The name has been criticized as inappropriate by some visitors, given its small size and urban setting.

== Brickline Greenway ==
The Brickline Greenway, formerly the Chouteau Greenway Project, is a public-private partnership that aims to connect Forest Park and the Washington University in St. Louis Danforth Campus to Gateway Arch National Park. Among the partners leading this project are the Arch to Park Collaborative, St. Louis City, and Washington University in St. Louis.

== See also ==
- List of national parks of the United States
