= Civil Courts Building =

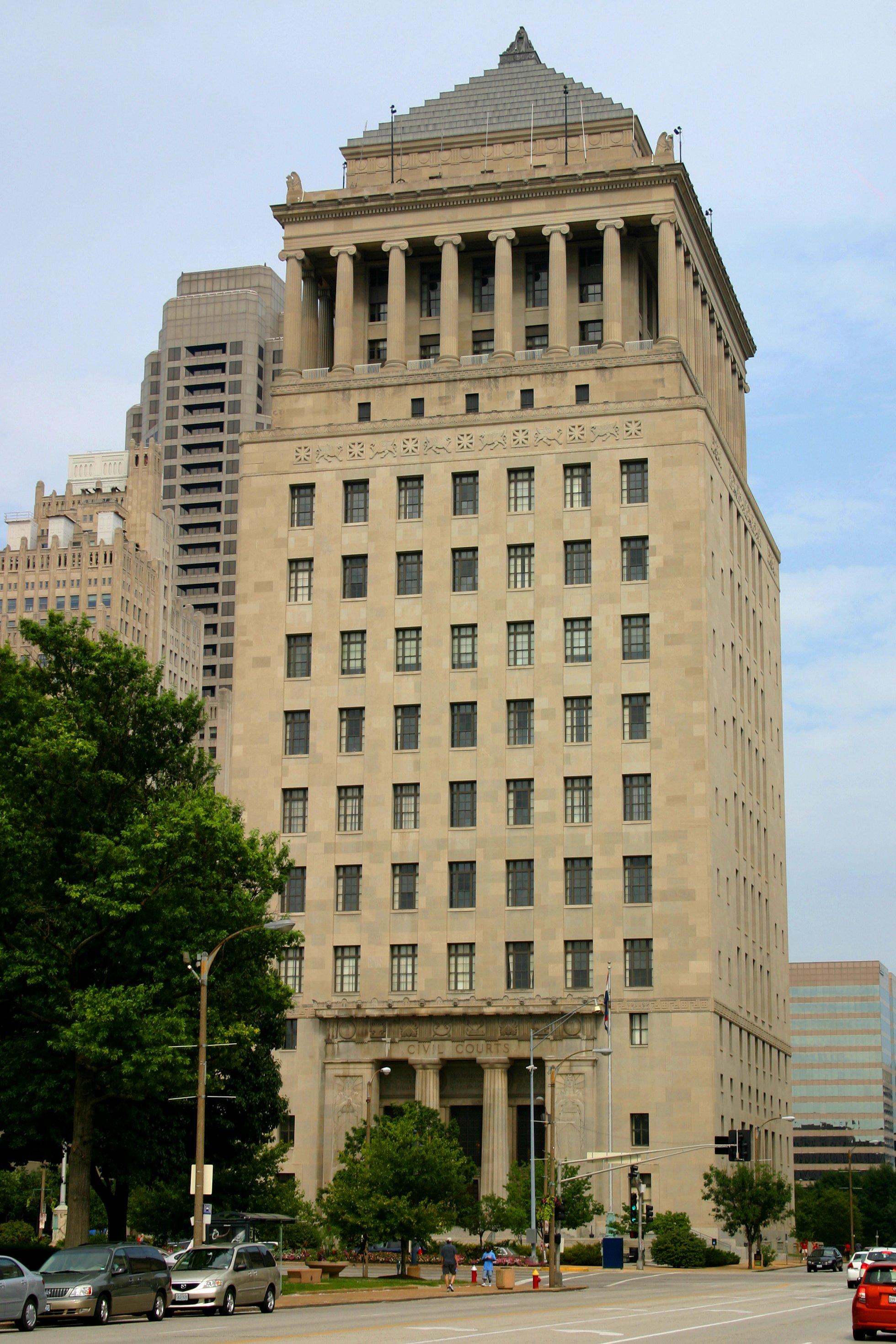

General information
- Status: Completed
- Type: Courthouse
- Location: 10 North Tucker Boulevard, St. Louis, Missouri
- Coordinates: 38.6276°N 90.1972°W
- Construction started: 1928; 98 years ago
- Completed: 1930; 96 years ago
- Cost: $4.5 million (64.1 million 2015)
- Owner: State of Missouri
- Operator: State of Missouri

Height
- Roof: 386 feet (118 m)

Technical details
- Floor count: 13

Design and construction
- Architects: Klipstein & Rathmann

The Civil Courts Building is a court building used by the 22nd Judicial Circuit Court of Missouri in St. Louis, Missouri.

The building with its pyramid shaped roof is prominently featured in the center of photos of the Gateway Arch from the Illinois side as its location on the Memorial Plaza is lined up in the middle directly behind the Old Courthouse.

The building was part of an $87 million bond issue ratified by voters in 1923 to build monumental buildings along the Memorial Plaza which also included Kiel Auditorium and the Municipal Service Building. The Plaza and the buildings were part of St. Louis's City Beautiful plan.

It replaced the Old Courthouse as the city's court building and its construction prompted the descendants of the founding father Auguste Chouteau to unsuccessfully sue the city to get the Old Courthouse back since the stipulation was that it was to always be the courthouse.

The pyramid roof on the top was designed to resemble the Mausoleum at Halicarnassus which was one of the Seven Wonders of the Ancient World. It features 32 Ionic columns. Each of the columns have 6 fluted drums, and a cap, and are about 42 feet (13 m) high, 5 1/2 feet in diameter. They are made of Indiana limestone.

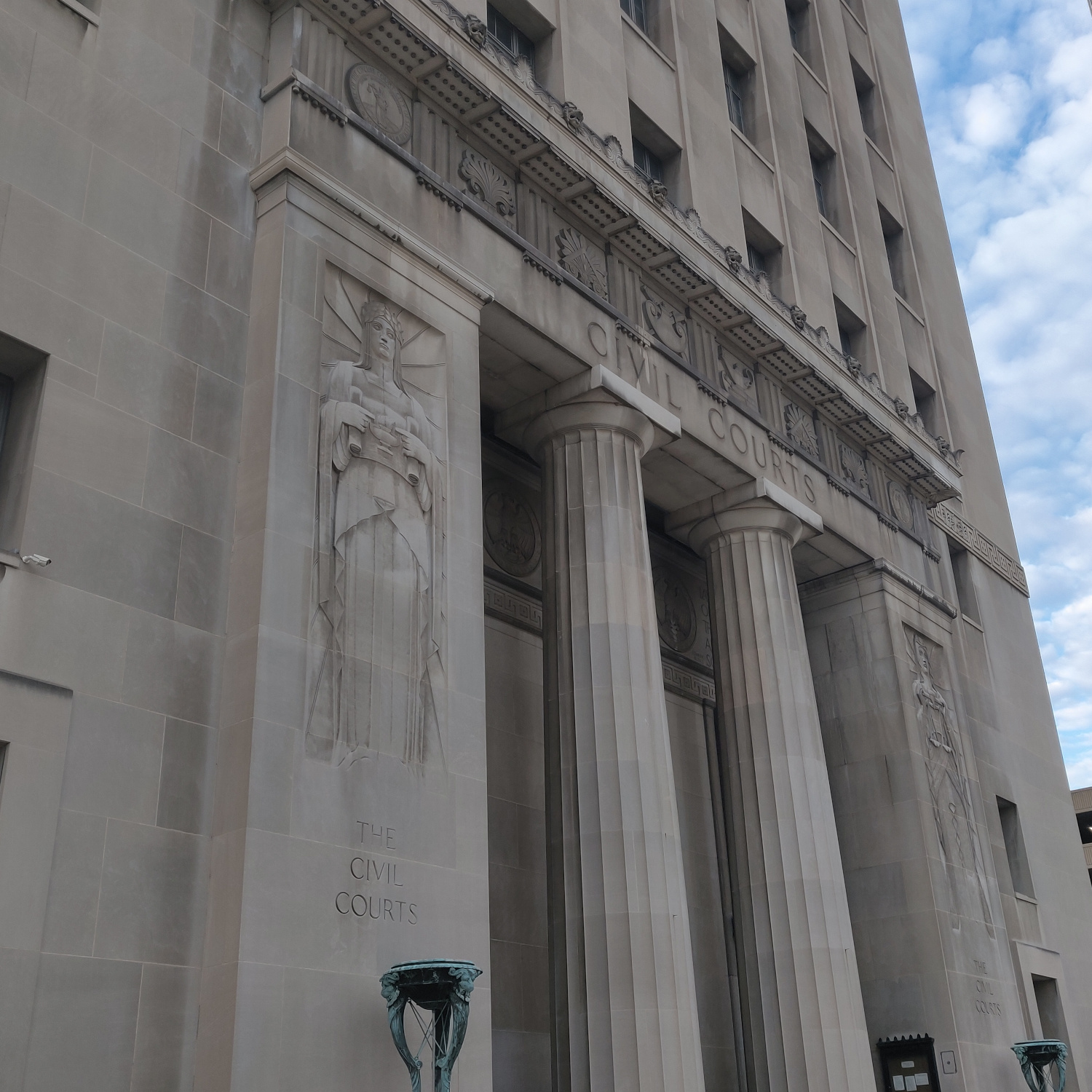
The facade of the St. Louis Civil Courts building, viewed from Market St. and N. 11th

The roof is made of cast aluminum and is topped by two 12-foot (3.7 m) high sphinx-like structures with the fleur-de-lis of St. Louis adorned on the chests. These sphinx-like creatures were sculpted by Cleveland sculptor, Steven A. Rebeck.

Some architectural elements from the building have been removed in renovations and taken to the Sauget, Illinois storage site of the National Building Arts Center.

During St. Louis PrideFest, the building has lit its columns up in a rotating rainbow pattern. In 2016, the top of the building lit up with 49 purple lights to show solidarity to the victims in the Orlando nightclub shooting. The tradition of Pride started in 2012, when the building was first lit up.
