= Loop Trolley =

Streetcar service in St Louis, Missouri

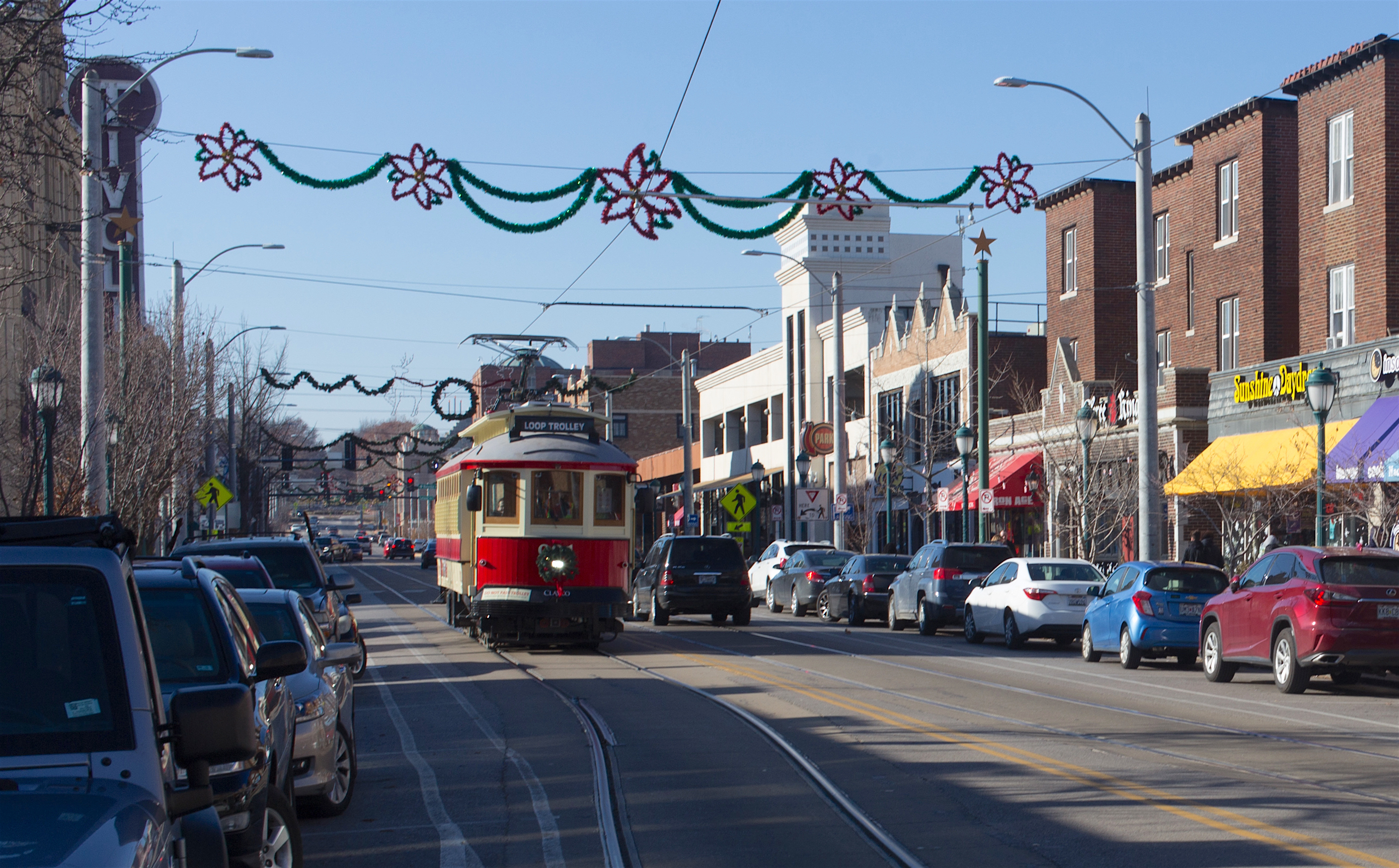
- Loop Trolley near Limit Avenue

Overview
- Status: Operational (Seasonal)
- Owner: Loop Trolley Transportation Development District
- Locale: St. Louis and University City, Missouri
- Termini: Missouri History Museum; University City Library
- Connecting lines: Red at Delmar Loop; Red Blue at Forest Park–DeBaliviere
- Stations: 10

Service
- Type: Heritage streetcar
- Operator(s): Metro Transit (2022–present); Loop Trolley Company (2018–2021)
- Ridership: 12,350 (2024)

History
- Opened: November 16, 2018
- Suspended: December 29, 2019
- Reopened: August 4, 2022

Technical
- Line length: 2.2 mi (3.5 km)
- Character: At-grade street running
- Track gauge: 4 ft 8 1/2 in (1,435 mm) standard gauge
- Electrification: Overhead line, 600 V DC

The Loop Trolley is a 2.2-mile (3.5 km), 10-station heritage streetcar line in and near the Delmar Loop area of greater St. Louis, Missouri, United States. The line and its three replica-historic streetcars are owned by the Loop Trolley Transportation Development District and operated by the Metro Transit division of the Bi-State Development Agency, whose board has voted to continue running the trolley through 2028.

The tracks start in western St. Louis, at the Missouri History Museum in Forest Park. They run north on DeBaliviere Avenue, with stops at MetroLink's Forest Park–DeBaliviere station and in the neighborhoods of DeBaliviere Place, Skinker/DeBaliviere, and the West End. They turn west on Delmar Boulevard to MetroLink's Delmar Loop station and cross the border of St. Louis County into University City, where they enter the Delmar Loop district and terminate at the University City Library just west of Kingsland Avenue.

The line was built for $51 million (about $69.3 million in 2025), more than half of which came from federal funds. Its annual operating expenses of $1.3 million were to be covered mostly by a one-cent sales tax collected by businesses along and near the line but also by fares and advertising.

The Loop Trolley opened for service in 2018. Ridership and revenue fell far short of expectations, in part because operations were limited to four days a week. The line shut down in 2019, but service resumed in 2022 after federal officials threatened to require repayment of construction grants if the trolley did not run.

Since then, the line has operated a no-fare service Thursdays through Sundays between April and October.

== History ==
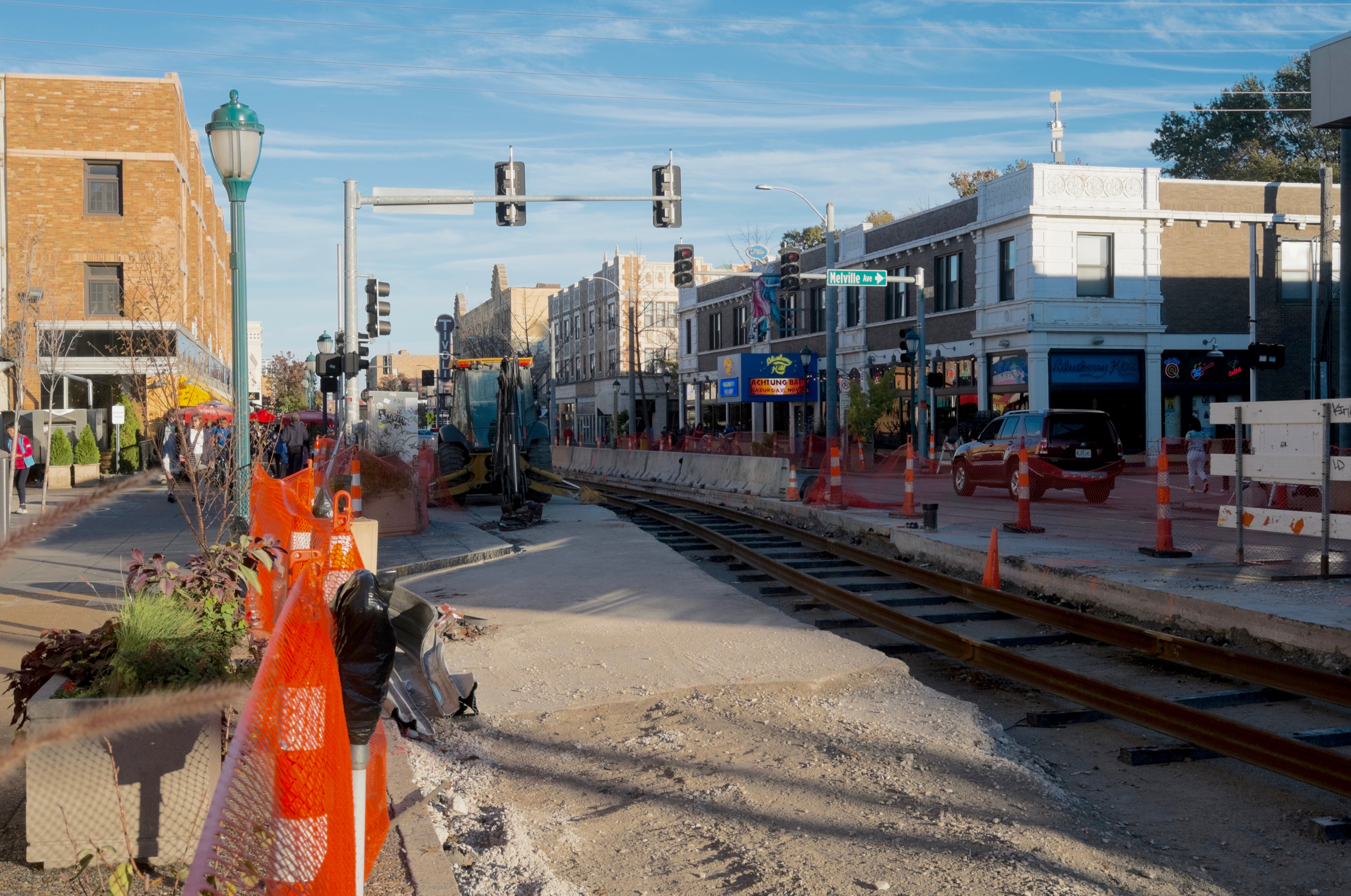
November 2015: Track construction under way on Delmar Boulevard

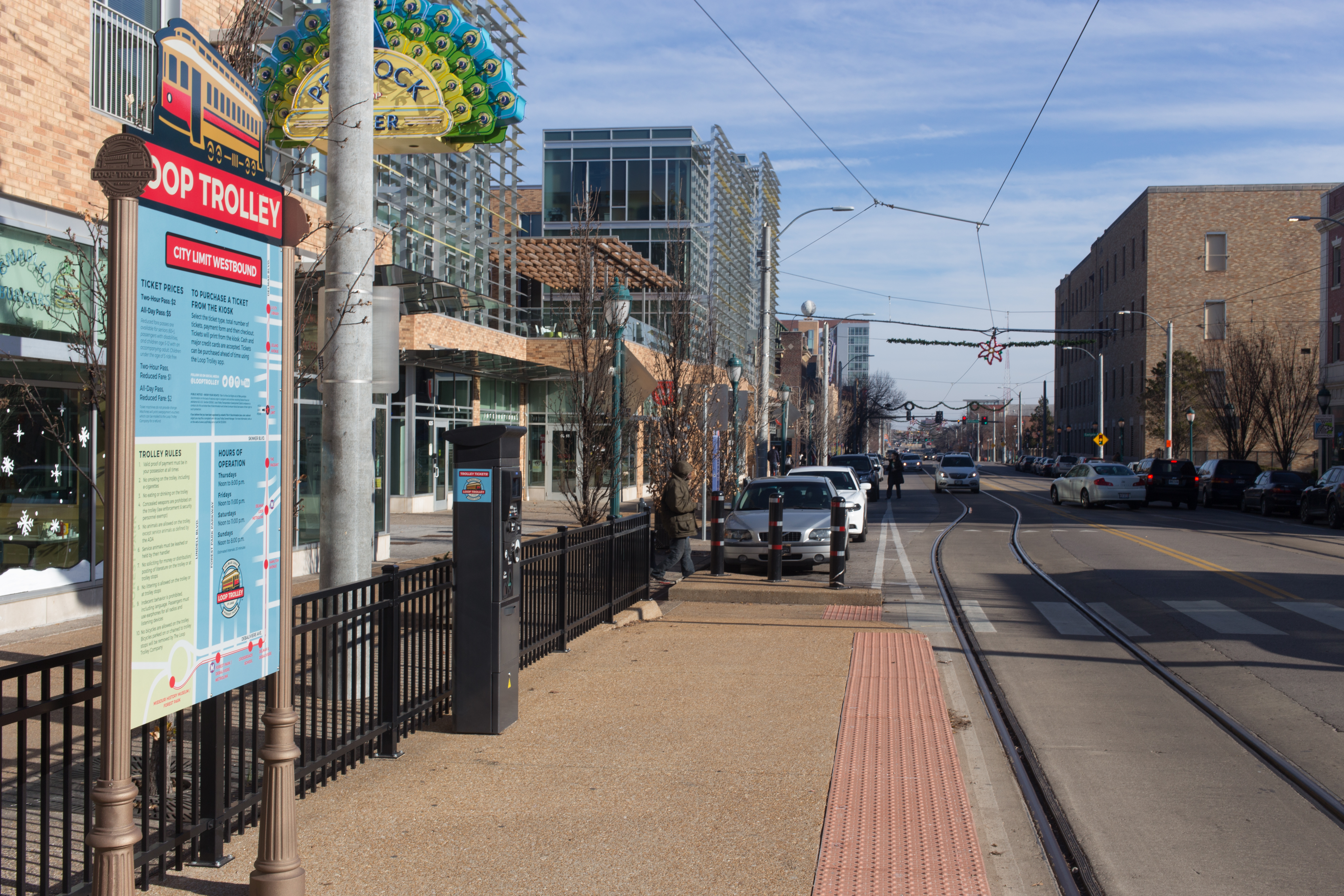
December 2018: A trolley stop on Delmar Boulevard, with map and ticket vending machine

=== Before operation ===
The Delmar Loop was named for the streetcar turnaround that occupied two oblong blocks on the north side of Delmar east from Kingsland Avenue. This loop was used by two lines of the St. Louis Public Service Company—the Olive-Delmar and Creve Coeur lines—and a private line west to what is now University City's City Hall. Streetcar service ended in St. Louis in 1966, but the Loop retained its name.

Around 1997, the idea of bringing back streetcars found a champion in Joe Edwards, the owner of Blueberry Hill, The Pageant, and other Loop businesses. Edwards eventually secured the purchase of two Peter Witt-type streetcars that once operated in Milan, Italy. The two Peter Witt cars were cosmetically refurbished by the Gomaco Trolley Company in 2005 and placed on long-term display along the route—one on Delmar by Commerce Bank, and the other at the Missouri History Museum—to publicize the proposed Loop Trolley line. Originally, the two were slated to carry passengers if the project came to fruition, but plans to restore them to operating condition were deemed too expensive in 2015, in part because they had deteriorated during their years on outdoor display.

In July 2010, the Federal Transit Administration's Urban Circulator Grant Program approved a grant of $25 million for the project. Ultimately, the FTA provided about $34 million to the project. Other funding came from the U.S. Department of Transportation's Congestion Mitigation and Air Quality Improvement Program and Surface Transportation Program, a Tax increment financing, a New Markets Tax Credit, the St. Louis County Transportation Fund, Great Rivers Greenway, Washington University, Loop Trolley Transportation Development District sales taxes, and donations.

Construction began in March 2015 with a budget of $51 million and anticipated annual ridership of 394,000 passengers. The trackwork was half done by November 2015 and was completed in November 2016. During construction, some shops and restaurants saw decreased foot traffic and sales. Some businesses moved; others closed permanently. One business owner called the Loop Trolley "a solution in need of a problem".

Originally, the service was operated by a separate non-profit entity called the Loop Trolley Company. In 2017, trolley officials projected that the first year of operation would see farebox revenue of $394,433 with all-day, seven-day service.

The first of three streetcars being refurbished and modified for the line was delivered on February 16, 2017, and the second on March 30, 2017. On March 26, 2017, car No. 001 was towed along the line to check the tracks and clearances at station platforms, becoming the first streetcar to be moved along the Loop Trolley line, though not under its own power.

In 2018, Loop Trolley officials said the first year's operating budget would be $1.3 million, of which $850,000 would come through the sales tax.

The line's opening was delayed several times as completion of a third trolley car fell behind schedule. Eventually, Loop Trolley officials decided to operate a temporarily reduced schedule with two trolleys until the third was delivered.

In November 2018, the Loop Trolley Company announced that the line would open on November 15, 2018, but snow delayed the opening one more day.

=== Loop Trolley Company operation ===
Service began on November 16, 2018. The two replica-historic streetcars initially ran four days a week: Thursdays, noon to 8 p.m.; Fridays and Saturdays, noon to 11 p.m.; and Sundays, noon to 8 p.m. Tickets cost $2 for a two-hour fare and $5 for an all-day fare. Cheaper tickets were available for passengers aged 5–12 or 65 or older, and for those with disabilities. Service was expected to expand to more hours, and seven days a week after a third trolley arrived.

A failure to obtain an operating permit from University City limited service during its first week to the portion between the Missouri History Museum terminus and the Delmar Loop MetroLink station. Before granting approval, city officials insisted that the Loop Trolley Transportation Development District install temporary protective barriers around an electric line tower and submit a $300,000 bond that would pay to dismantle the tracks if the trolley endeavor failed. LTTDD officials complied, and received their operating permit on November 21.

Trolleys began running along the entire line on November 23. "The only trouble in evidence about 3 p.m. had nothing to do with the trolleys’ antique technology and everything to do with automated ticket machines that passengers struggled to learn," wrote the St. Louis Post-Dispatch.

In July 2019, officials announced that the Trolley had taken in just $22,283 in fare revenue in its first six months of operation, roughly one-tenth of their 2015 projection. They noted that the 2015 estimate had been based on seven-day operations with three trolleys.

On October 17, 2019, a "winter schedule" curtailed operating hours so that trolleys stopped running at 6 p.m.

On December 5, 2019, the operators of the Loop Trolley announced that the line would shut down on December 29 due to a lack of operating funds and low revenue. The sales tax raised about $860,000 in 2019, in line with expectations. But ridership was far lower than projected: the trolley sold 15,776 tickets in its first 11 months, far fewer than the amount needed to prevent a budget shortfall. Officials blamed the lack of ridership on the four-day schedule and the limited service caused by the lack of the third trolley. No. 003 (ex-Seattle, ex-Melbourne), had still not been cleared to enter service when the line shut down.

=== Operation suspended ===
The trolley ceased operations on December 29, 2019. The Bi-State Development Agency, a regional transit operator, immediately began seeking ways to restart operations. Agency officials proposed to take over operations for four years with the aim of making the Loop Trolley self-sustaining by 2024. But on January 24, 2020, a Bi-State committee voted to reject the proposal; opponents said they doubted it would work.

At the committee meeting, Mokhtee Ahmad, the Federal Transit Administration's regional administrator, said that if no one restarted the Loop Trolley, his agency might sue to recover about $25 million that it had provided for construction. The money would be owed by the Loop Trolley Transportation Development District and East-West Gateway Council of Governments, a regional planning organization. Ahmad also "implied that any litigation to recover federal money could hurt St. Louis’ applications for future federal grants," St. Louis Public Radio wrote.

Three months after service ceased, the Loop Trolley's website had not been updated to reflect the system's suspended status. Joe Edwards, a Loop developer and chairman of the trolley taxing district, suggested in a newspaper interview and a letter to Ahmad that the arrival of the third trolley car combined with the revenue from the sales tax could enable the trolley to restart service in April.

In August 2020, the website was changed to say: "To support regional efforts to eliminate COVID-19 during the ongoing pandemic, the Loop Trolley is currently out of service." (The site continued to ascribe the suspension to the pandemic through July 24, 2022.)

On October 27, 2021, the East-West Gateway Council of Governments rejected a plan to use $1.26 million in federal money plus $540,000 from a sales tax along the route to restart Loop Trolley service.

=== Renewed operation ===
On February 25, 2022, the Bi-State Development Board voted to take over and restart operation of the Loop Trolley through June 2025. Board members said restarting trolley operations was preferable to repaying millions of dollars in federal grants spent to build it.

St. Louis Mayor Tishaura Jones, who had opposed the trolley restart but also preferred it to repaying the money, informed Ahmad of the decision in a February 25 letter. She acknowledged federal officials' request that service be restarted in June 2022, but said operation might be delayed to ensure safety. Jones wrote that “the determining factor for a prudent opening date” would be up to the Missouri Department of Transportation.

As of February 2022, the trolley operating fund included $881,321 collected via the local sales tax. Jones said the district estimated it would collect $773,787 in sales tax in 2022. The trolley authority also resubmitted a request for a $1.26 million grant to the East-West Gateway Council of Governments; a decision was expected in August.

Service resumed on August 4, 2022, operating Thursdays through Sundays and until only October 30, instead of year-round as it had in the past. More than 8,000 rides were given during the nearly three-month operating season, according to Bi-State Development President and CEO Taulby Roach.

In 2023, service ran from April 27 through October 29. The six-month operating season saw more than 8,500 rides: an absolute increase over 2022 but a decline in average monthly ridership, from about 2,500 to fewer than 1,400. In November 2023, Roach said Bi-State was considering operating the trolley until 2026, one more year than the planned five.

The 2024 season ran from April 25 to October 27, with service Thursdays through Sundays. It gave an estimated 12,350 rides, about 44 percent more than the previous season. It also operated within its budget, Roach said in November 2024. He said Bi-State would work with the FTA and the Loop Trolley Transportation Development District "on an extension of this management contract so that we can continue to fulfill the obligation to the FTA and operate within reasonable expectations”.

On February 28, 2025, the Bi-State board voted to keep running the Loop Trolley for 32 hours a week between April and October through 2028.

The 2025 season runs from May 1 through October 26, with service from 11 a.m. to 7 p.m. Thursdays through Sundays.

== Rolling stock ==
Loop Trolley service was provided by two faux-vintage streetcars acquired used from Portland, Oregon. A third vintage streetcar from Seattle was expected to join the fleet in 2019.

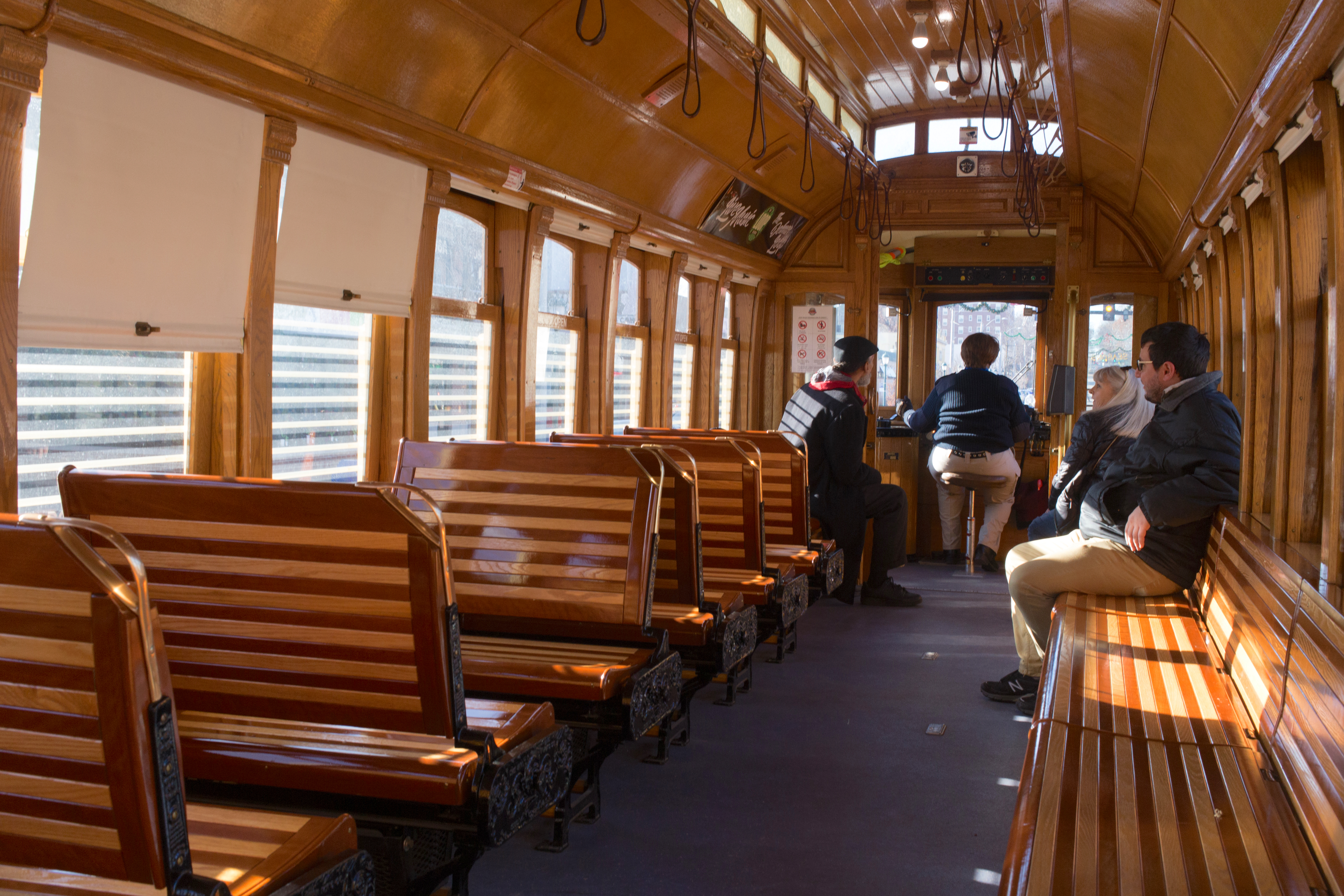
Interior of one of the ex-Portland cars

In December 2013, the Loop Trolley district acquired from Portland transit agency TriMet two Gomaco-built Brill-replica streetcars which were then in operation on the Portland Vintage Trolley service, which use continued until mid-2014. Those two cars were designed to look like 1903 streetcars but were actually built in 1991 (car 511) and 1992 (car 512), and feature steel frames under their wooden bodies and more-modern propulsion equipment (including rebuilt 1940s trucks). For St. Louis, they were modified for wheelchair accessibility, to meet ADA regulations, with the installation of wheelchair lifts (one per side). Gomaco was hired to carry out those and other modifications, and the work began at Gomaco's Ida Grove, Iowa, plant in August 2015.

In January 2016, it was announced that the Loop Trolley district had purchased three ex-Melbourne, Australia, W2-type streetcars from Seattle, which had operated on Seattle's Waterfront Streetcar line until it shut down in 2005. Only one of the three was planned for immediate refurbishment, modification and use due to funding limitations. The necessary modifications included restoring doors on one side of the car, restoring steps to the doors (Seattle's line used high-platform stations which didn't necessitate steps), installing two wheelchair lifts, one on each side, and replacement of the car's trolley poles with a pantograph. The three cars were moved from Seattle in early June 2016. Cars 482 and 518 were taken to St. Louis and put in indefinite storage for potential future restoration and use. Car 512 was taken to Gomaco in Iowa, which had been awarded a $676,750 contract to restore and modify the car.

The operational fleet was to comprise three cars in 2019: two ex-Portland Brill replica cars (Portland Nos. 511–512) and one ex-Seattle, ex-Melbourne car (Seattle No. 512). Ex-Portland cars 511–512 were renumbered 002 and 001, respectively, and ex-Seattle, ex-Melbourne car 512 was renumbered 003. Car 001 is painted red and cream, Car 002 blue and cream, and Car 003 orange and cream.

When the line opened in 2018, Car 003 was still at Gomaco's Iowa plant, with its renovation and modification more than a year behind schedule, partly due to delays in getting parts from Germany. Car 003 was delivered to the Loop Trolley's maintenance facility on January 29, 2019.

As part of the effort to reduce operating costs, Bi-State decided to shrink the fleet from five to two cars. In 2024, Car 003 was returned to Gomaco along with Car 482 and Car 518.

No.	Image	Type	Former No.	Former operator	Acquired	Status	Refs.
1351		Peter Witt streetcar	1906	Azienda Trasporti Milanesi	August 2005	Returned to Gomaco	
1352		Peter Witt streetcar	1811	Azienda Trasporti Milanesi	August 2005	Renumbered back to 1811 and acquired by Midwest Electric Railway	
482		W2-type tram		Waterfront Streetcar	June 2016	Acquired by Gomaco	
518		W2-type tram		Waterfront Streetcar	June 2016	Acquired by Gomaco	
001		Replica Council Crest trolley	512	Portland Vintage Trolley	February 16, 2017	In operation	
002		Replica Council Crest trolley	511	Portland Vintage Trolley	March 30, 2017	In operation	
003		W2-type tram	512	Waterfront Streetcar	January 29, 2019	Returned to Gomaco	

== Maintenance facility ==
The Loop Trolley's administrative headquarters and maintenance facility are located at 5875 Delmar Boulevard, in a building that had been Delmar High School until 1980.

== See also ==
- Streetcars in North America
- St. Charles City Streetcar
- St. Louis Metrolink
