= Delmar Loop station =

Light rail station in St. Louis, Missouri, US

Delmar Loop
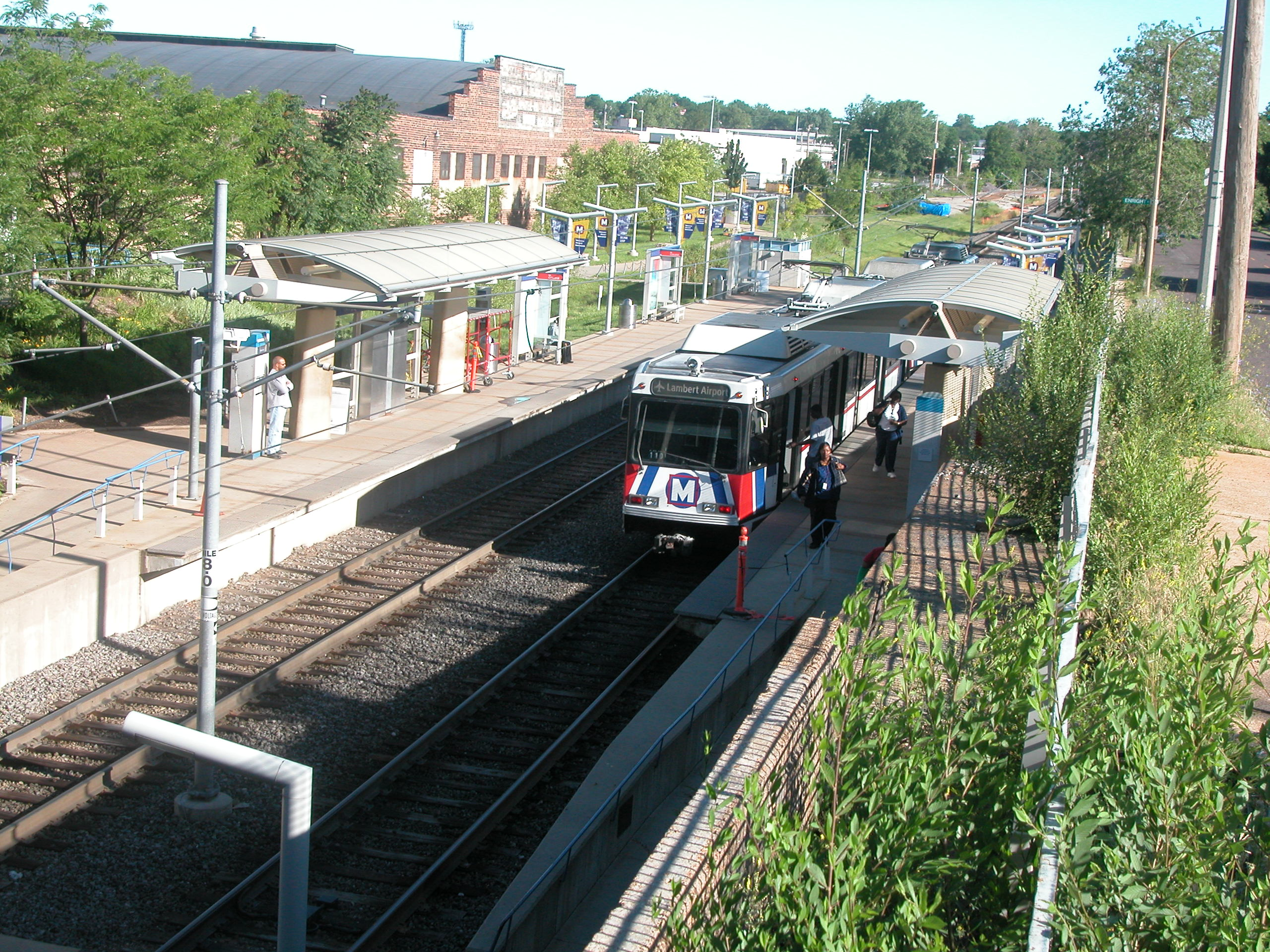
- Delmar Loop station platforms as seen from above

General information
- Location: 660 Rosedale Avenue; St. Louis, Missouri
- Coordinates: 38.655653°N 90.294591°W
- Owner: Bi-State Development
- Operator: Metro Transit
- Platforms: 2 side platforms
- Tracks: 2
- Bus stands: 6
- Connections: MetroBus Missouri: 02, 16, 91, 97; Loop Trolley

Construction
- Structure type: Below-grade
- Parking: 362 spaces
- Cycle facilities: Rack
- Accessible: Yes

History
- Opened: July 31, 1993
- Former names: Delmar

Passengers
- 2018: 1,692 daily
- Rank: 6 out of 38

Services
Preceding station	MetroLink	Following station
Wellston toward Lambert Airport Terminal 1	Red Line	Forest Park–DeBaliviere toward Shiloh–Scott
Location

Delmar Loop station is a light rail station on the Red Line of the St. Louis MetroLink system. This below-grade station is adjacent to Delmar Boulevard and Des Peres and Hodiamont avenues and serves the popular Delmar Loop area.

The Loop Trolley, a seasonally operated heritage streetcar service that travels along Delmar Boulevard and DeBaliviere Avenue, has a stop adjacent to the entrance of the station.

== History ==
The station is located below the Wabash Railroad's Delmar Boulevard station, which closed in 1970.

On July 26, 2022, the Delmar Loop station was impacted by a flash flood that shut down MetroLink for nearly 72 hours and caused roughly $40 million in overall damage. Damage near the Delmar Loop station included roughly 5 miles (8.0 km) of track bed, a communications room and a two-car train. By September, normal Red Line service had resumed while restricted service continued on the Blue Line. On July 31, 2023, Metro received $27.7 million in federal emergency disaster relief funding to help cover the cost of flood damage.

== Station layout ==
The platforms can be accessed via stairs or ramps from Hodiamont Avenue, Des Peres Avenue, and the park and ride lot off of Rosedale Avenue.

== Bus connections ==
The following MetroBus routes serve Delmar Loop station:

- 02 Red
- 16 City Limits
- 91 Olive
- 97 Delmar

== Public artwork ==
In 1997, Metro's Arts in Transit program commissioned the work TileLink by Catharine Magel for installation along the pedestrian path between the park and ride lot and the station. TileLink demonstrates how the impact of public art can be a rallying point for the revitalization of neighborhoods and communities. TileLink was the first permanent artwork installation commissioned by Arts in Transit.

In 2003, the Arts in Transit program commissioned another work nearby the station along the Pageant walkway. Titled Vertical Loop and created by Ron Fondaw, the piece is an installation of seven sculptures composed of three-dimensional, fiberglass objects designed to reflect the Delmar Loop.

In 2009, Arts in Transit commissioned another work for the station. Titled Hive and created by Janet Lofquist, the honeycomb structure, made of weathering steel, is a symbol for the collective spirit of the community. Starting as a beehive shape, the hexagonal geometry transitions into a spiral of growth and ends in an abstracted question mark. The weathered steel suggests an industrial past and contrasts with the white cell interiors.

== Notable places nearby ==
- Delmar Loop
- The Pageant
- Tivoli Theater
- Washington University in St. Louis, North Campus
