= Tivoli Theatre (University City, Missouri) =

Coordinates: 38.6558°N 90.3033°W

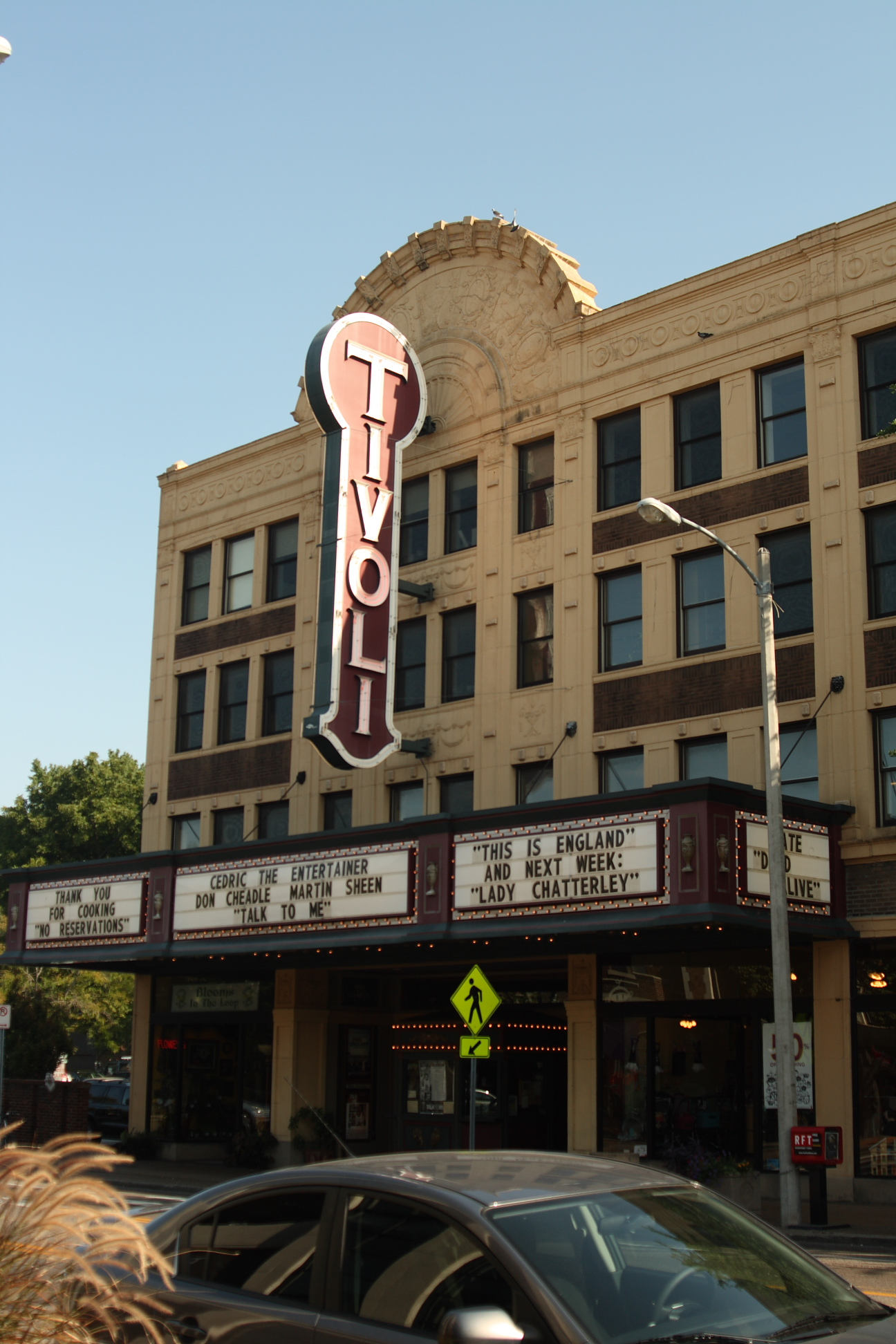
The facade and marquee of the Tivoli Theatre

The Tivoli Theatre opened on May 24, 1924, as a large, single-screen theater with streetcar service in the middle of Delmar Boulevard bringing people to the theater from nearby residential neighborhoods. The theater remained open for many years, but went into decline until it was closed in 1994.

A renovation was started by developer Joe Edwards and his wife Linda and the theater re-opened on May 19, 1995. Renovation expenses exceeding $2 million attempted to restore the theater to its 1924 splendor.

While operating as a theatre from 1995 until 2021, the Tivoli Theatre showed predominantly independent, documentary and foreign language films, what are commonly referred to as art films, that were made primarily to show the craft of filmmaking or the art of storytelling while entertaining or informing. It occasionally showed cult films, especially at late night showings.

In 2021 Edwards agreed to sell the Tivoli Building to the One Family Church and Integrity Web Consulting. The theater is now operated as the home to the One Family Church. As of 2023, the theatre has undergone renovation under the new ownership, while also holding church services. One Family Church has also stated that the theater will open back up for showing movies only on Fridays. In addition to the theatre, the adjacent property is home to the Tivoli Offices.

== See also ==
- The Delmar Loop in University City, Missouri
- Loop Trolley, which opened in 2018 and passes the theatre
