= Joe Edwards (St. Louis) =

St. Louis businessman

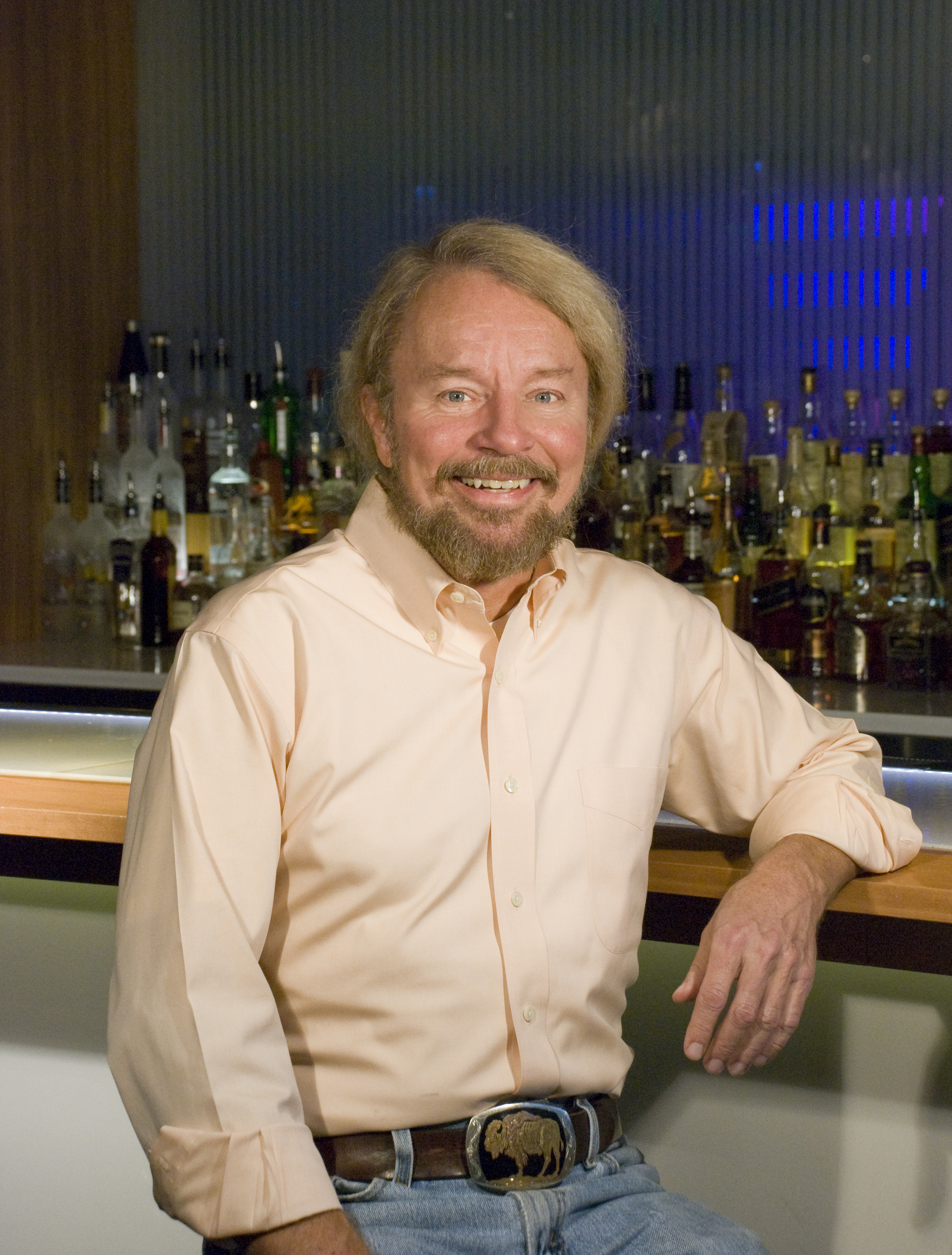
Joe Edwards

Joe Edwards is a businessman, developer, and civic leader who helped revitalize the Delmar Loop area, which connects St. Louis and University City, Missouri. Dubbed "The Duke of Delmar" by St. Louis Magazine, he opened his first business in The Loop in the 1970s and has since led efforts to transform the Delmar Loop into one of the most vibrant restaurant, shopping, and arts-and-entertainment districts in the country. In 2007, the American Planning Association named The Loop "One of the 10 Great Streets in America.

In 1972, Edwards opened Blueberry Hill restaurant and music club, sparking a decades-long revitalization of the street. Rock legend and Rock and Roll Hall of Fame inductee Chuck Berry performed 209 monthly concerts in Blueberry Hill's Duck Room.

Edwards has since renovated numerous historic buildings in The Loop and around St. Louis and encouraged one-of-a-kind specialty shops, restaurants, and cultural institutions to make The Loop their home. His own ventures include saving and restoring the 1924 Tivoli Theatre movie theater (1995), and opening such establishments as The Pageant concert nightclub (2000), Pin-Up Bowl martini lounge and bowling alley (2003), Flamingo Bowl bowling alley and lounge on Washington Avenue in downtown St. Louis (2007), the boutique Moonrise Hotel (2009), the Peacock Diner (closed 2025) (2014), Delmar Hall concert club (2016), and Magic Mini Golf (2023).

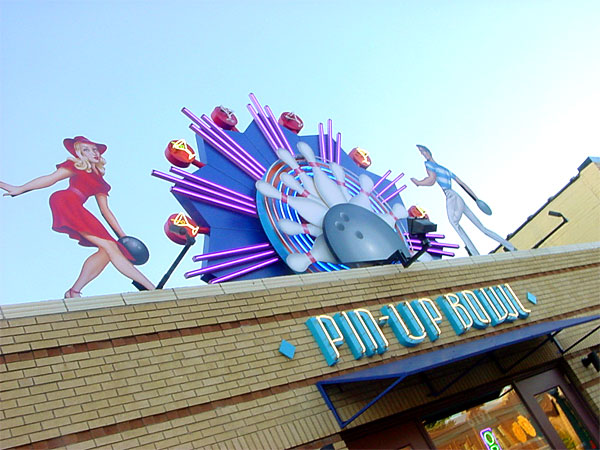
The Pin-Up Bowl, one of Edwards' two bowling alley lounges

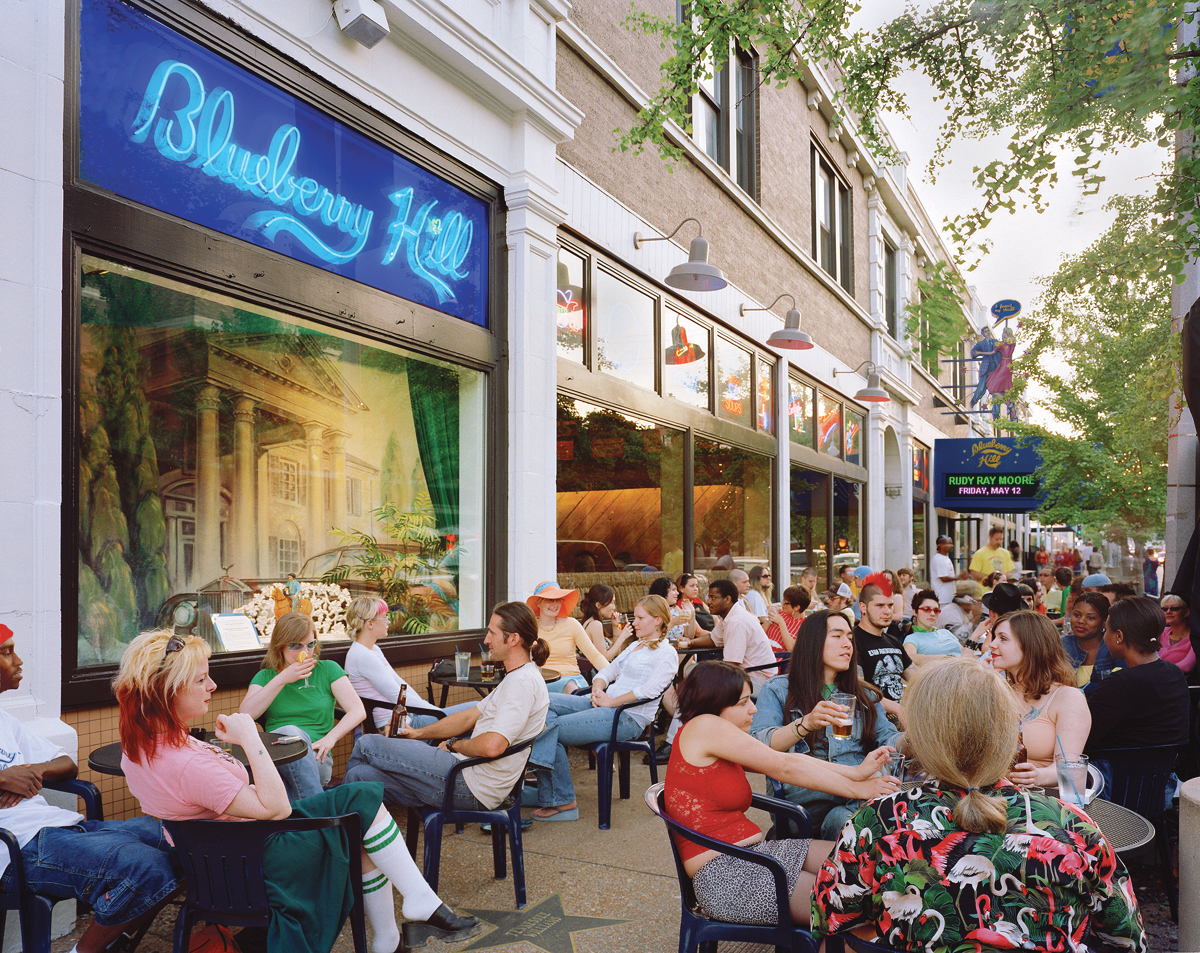
Patio seating at Blueberry Hill

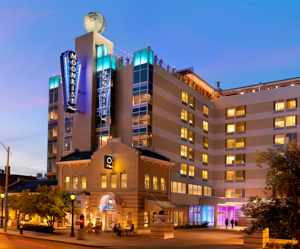
The Moonrise Hotel

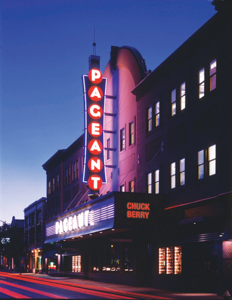
The Pageant Music Venue

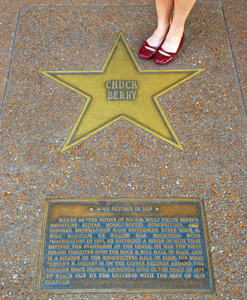
Chuck Berry's star in the St. Louis Walk of Fame

In 1988, Edwards founded the non-profit St. Louis Walk of Fame to honor great St. Louisans and their contributions to American culture. More than 150 inductees are described in brass stars and informative bronze plaques set into the Loop's sidewalks. In 2013, he published an updated St. Louis Walk of Fame book. The non-profit donates a copy to every St. Louis metro area junior high and high school library.

In 1997, Edwards began leading an effort to bring a fixed-track vintage trolley system to The Loop, with two stops near MetroLink stations and its east end in Forest Park near the history museum. In 2010, the Delmar Loop Trolley project received a $24.9 million grant from the Federal Transit Administration. It opened and began operation in 2018, after much controversy regarding the effect of years-long construction on neighborhood businesses, with concerns rising about the trolley's long-term profitability. On December 29, 2019, after just over a year of operation, the trolley temporarily paused operations due to low ridership and lack of funds but in 2023 it reopened and runs Thursdays through Sundays during the warmer months.

In 2003, Edwards received the St. Louis Award. Between 2004 and 2006, Edwards received an honorary doctorate of laws from Washington University in St. Louis an honorary doctorate of fine arts from Saint Louis University in 2005, and an honorary doctorate of humanitarian letters from the University of Missouri-St. Louis.

In 2013, Edwards received Washington University's Gerry and Bob Virgil Ethic of Service Award. On September 12, 2013, Edwards received the lifetime achievement award from the Landmarks Association of St. Louis for his work in historic preservation and community revitalization.

In 2022, Blueberry Hill turned 50 years old.

In 2023, he opened Magic Mini Golf across from the Pageant and Moonrise Hotel in the Delmar Loop. It has 18 holes of whimsical indoor miniature golf, two full-size shuffleboard courts, and a 5-car Ferris wheel.

His 27-foot tall animated neon sign and marquee for Magic Mini Golf won a juried Signs of the Times international sign award in 2023. Designed by Edwards and his daughter Hope Edwards, the colorful blinking sign features a retro-style man and woman swinging golf clubs. As the figures putt, the golf ball moves across the sign which rises over a custom-designed curved semicircular marquee.
