= Delmar Loop =

Entertainment, cultural and restaurant district in University City, Missouri

- The Loop
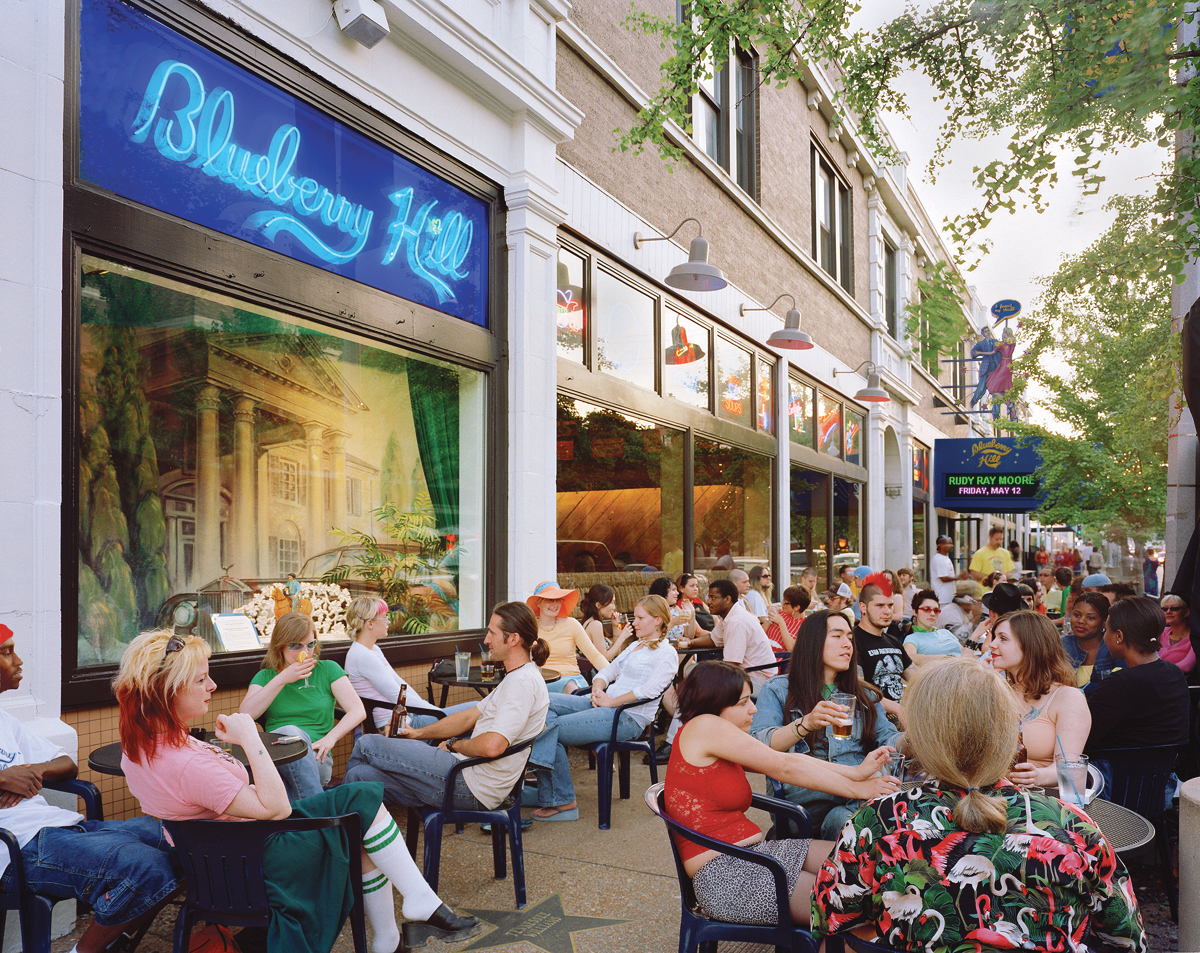
- Patio seating at Blueberry Hill, a restaurant on the Delmar Loop.
- Interactive map of Delmar Loop
- Part of: Delmar Boulevard
- Coordinates: 38°39′21″N 90°18′12″W

The Delmar Loop, often referred to by St. Louis residents simply as The Loop, is an entertainment, cultural and restaurant district in University City, Missouri and the adjoining western edge of St. Louis near Washington University in St. Louis and Forest Park.

Many of its attractions are located in the streetcar suburb of University City, but the area is expanding eastward into the Skinker DeBaliviere neighborhood of the City of St. Louis. In 2007, the American Planning Association named the Delmar Loop "One of the 10 Great Streets in America."

== Origin and overview ==
The area gets its name from a streetcar turnaround, or "loop", formerly located in the area.

Delmar Boulevard was originally known as Morgan Street. Norbury L. Wayman wrote in History of St. Louis Neighborhoods that the name Delmar was coined when two early landowners living on opposite sides of the road, one from Delaware and one from Maryland, combined the names of their home states. The town of Delmar, Delaware, on the border between the two states, derived its name in similar fashion.

The Delmar Loop station, a stop on the MetroLink Red Line, sits at the eastern end of the area.

The western end of the Loop is generally considered to be the U. City Lions: sculptures of a male lion and a female lion on pedestals flanking Delmar immediately west of the University City City Hall. West of the lions, Delmar becomes largely residential. The eastern boundary of the Loop traditionally was the St. Louis City border, punctuated by The Delmar Lounge at the corner of Delmar and Eastgate, but the area began expanding into the city proper around 2000. This expansion has largely been due to the redevelopment efforts of Joe and Linda Edwards, owners of Blueberry Hill, The Pageant, and Pin-Up Bowl, Magic Mini Golf, the Moonrise Hotel, and Eclipse Restaurant. The St. Louis Regional Arts Commission completed its new headquarters on Delmar in 2003, creating performance and office spaces for theater groups. The Pageant, located across Delmar from the Arts Commission, has become one of St. Louis's main venues for mid-size popular musical performances, featuring rap, rock, and country artists, including St. Louisans Chuck Berry and Nelly.

The Loop attracts an eclectic clientele and wide variety of street life, due in part to its proximity to Washington University and dating back to the late 1960s when Streetside Records and head shops dominated the retail landscape.

== Attractions and institutions ==
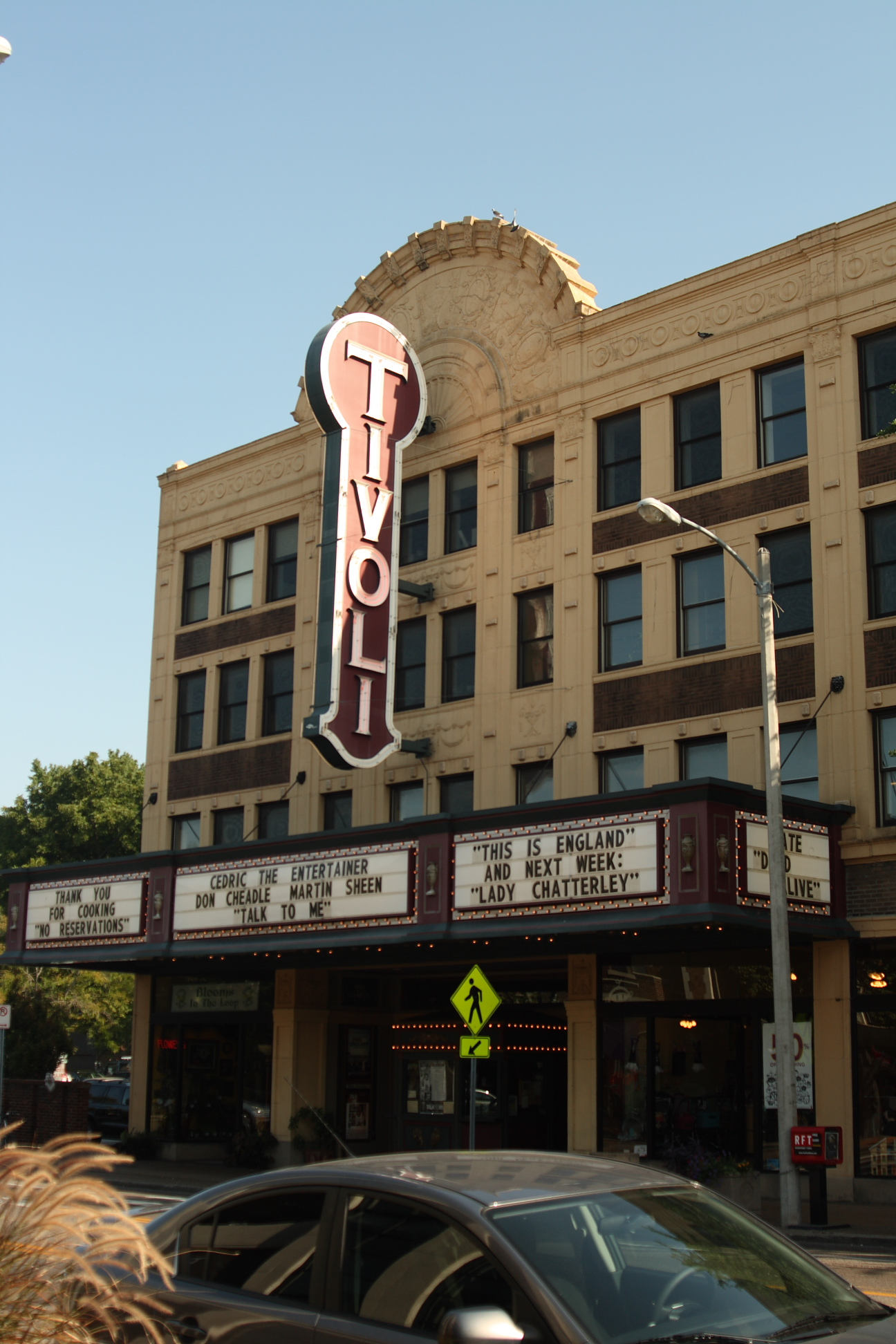
The Tivoli Theatre is a three-screen art house theater on the Delmar Loop

Loop institutions include:

- The Pageant music venue
- Riverfront Times newspaper
- Tivoli Theater
- University City City Hall
- University City Public Library
- Blueberry Hill pub and restaurant
- Fitz's Restaurant and Bottling Company

Other establishments on the Loop include the 560 Music Center (owned by Washington University in St. Louis), COCA Center for Creative Arts, Craft Alliance Center of Art + Design, Moonrise Hotel, Subterranean Books, and Vintage Vinyl record store.

Local restaurants include Al-Tarboush deli, Blueprint Coffee, Salt and Smoke, Katsuya STL, Up Late, Fork & Stix, Nudo House, Paris Bahn Mi STL, Corner 17 Chinese Restaurant, Gokul Indian Restaurant, Gyro House, Meshuggah Cafe, Session Taco (formerly Mission Taco), Seoul Taco, Ranoush Mediterranean Cuisine, Snarf's Sandwiches, T-N-T Wieners, Vegas Wok, and four Thai restaurants owned by Pat's Thai Restaurants.

Once-prominent restaurants that have closed include Cicero's Italian Restaurant (closed in 2017), Piccione Pastry (closed in 2019), Three Kings Public House (closed due to 2023 fire), and Peacock Loop Diner (closed in January 2025).

=== St. Louis Walk of Fame ===
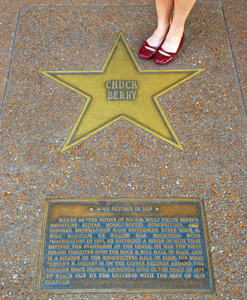
Chuck Berry's star in the St. Louis Walk of Fame

The Loop is the home of the St. Louis Walk of Fame, a series of brass plaques embedded in the sidewalk along Delmar Boulevard commemorating famous St. Louisans, including musicians Chuck Berry, Miles Davis and Tina Turner, actor John Goodman, bridge-builder James Eads and sexologists Masters and Johnson.

=== Trolley ===
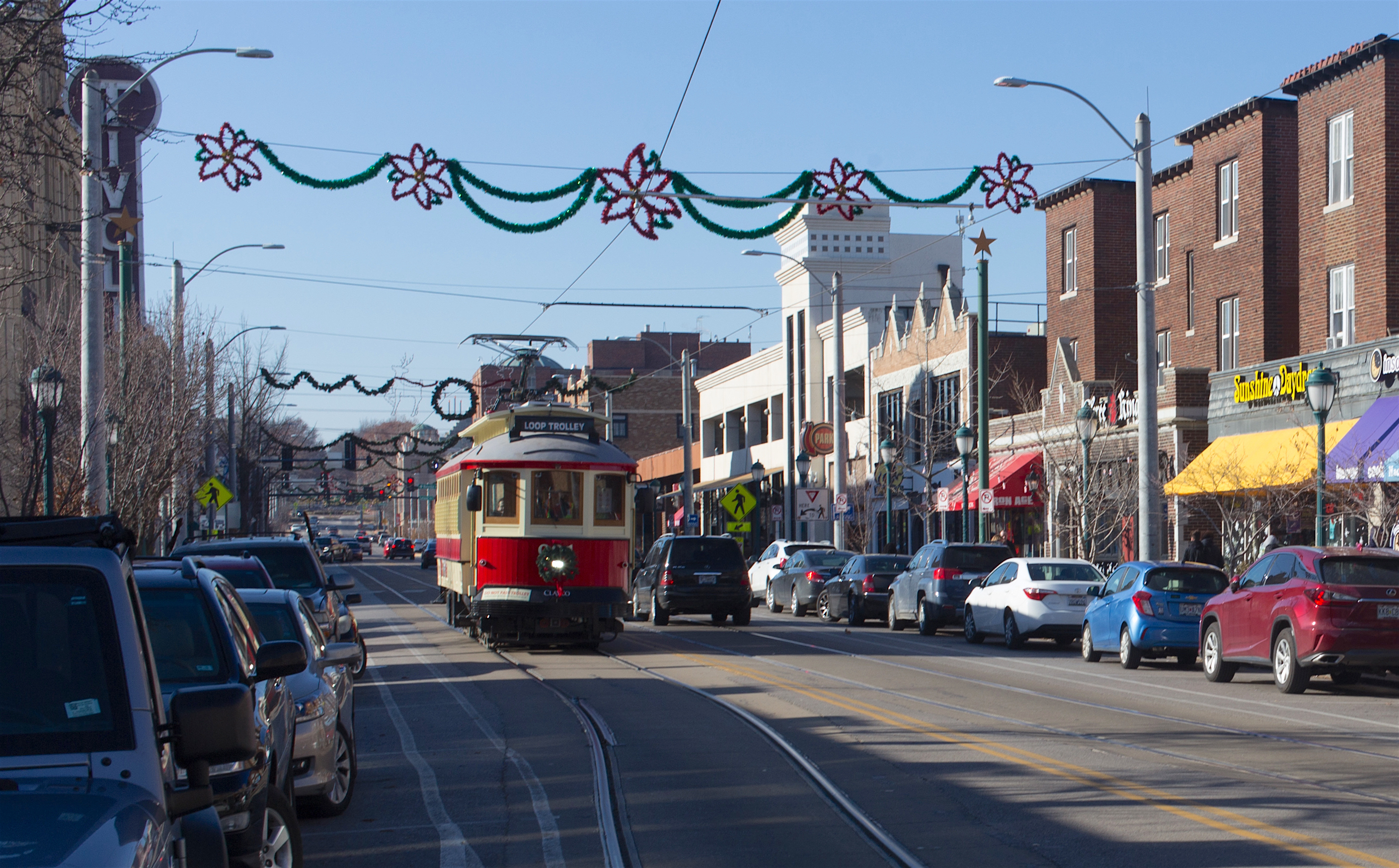
A Loop Trolley car in the Loop, on Delmar Blvd passing the Tivoli Theatre

The Loop Trolley is a 2.2-mile fixed-track heritage trolley line in the Loop, that links the area with MetroLink and Forest Park attractions. The trolley operated for several weeks in fall 2018 and for a full season in 2019 but was shut down because fare revenue was far less than anticipated. It reopened in August 2022 after the federal government threatened to require the repayment of $24.9 million granted to build it. Since then, the trolley has run Thursdays through Sundays between April and October; riders pay no fare.

== History ==
During the 1950s, the Loop was the meeting place for U. City's teenagers. The Varsity Theater and the Tivoli showed first-run movies. Ed's Billiards which was located between the two theaters was always full of teenagers. There were restaurants up and down the Loop area. Enright Avenue, which was part of the streetcar turnaround, had a drug store and three restaurants plus a record store. There was another drug store on the corner of Delmar and Kingsland. Both drugstores had soda fountains. Delmar at Skinker wasn't considered part of the Loop but had a Garaveli's Restaurant and a well known nightclub Davy "Nose" Bold's across from it.

The video for the song "Air Force Ones", by rapper Nelly was filmed in the Delmar Loop. Nelly's hit "Country Grammar (Hot Shit)", references the Loop extensively.

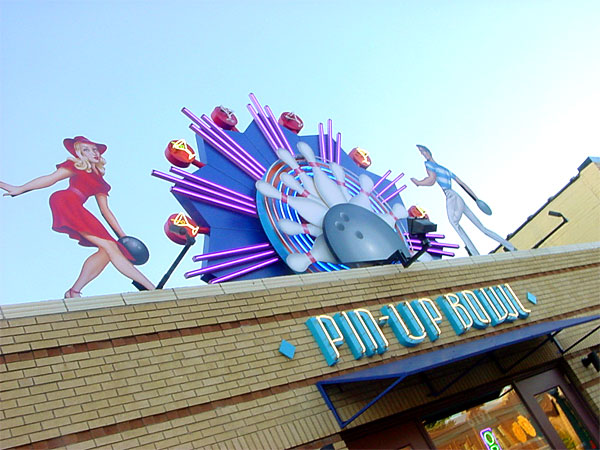
Pin-Up Bowl is a bowling alley located in the east section of the Loop.

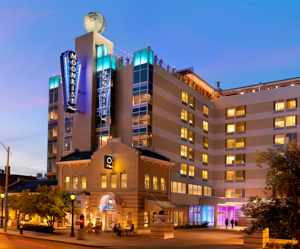
The Moonrise Hotel

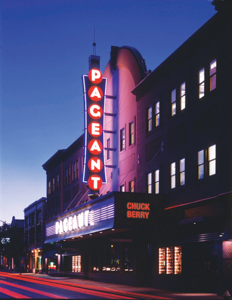
The Pageant Music Venue

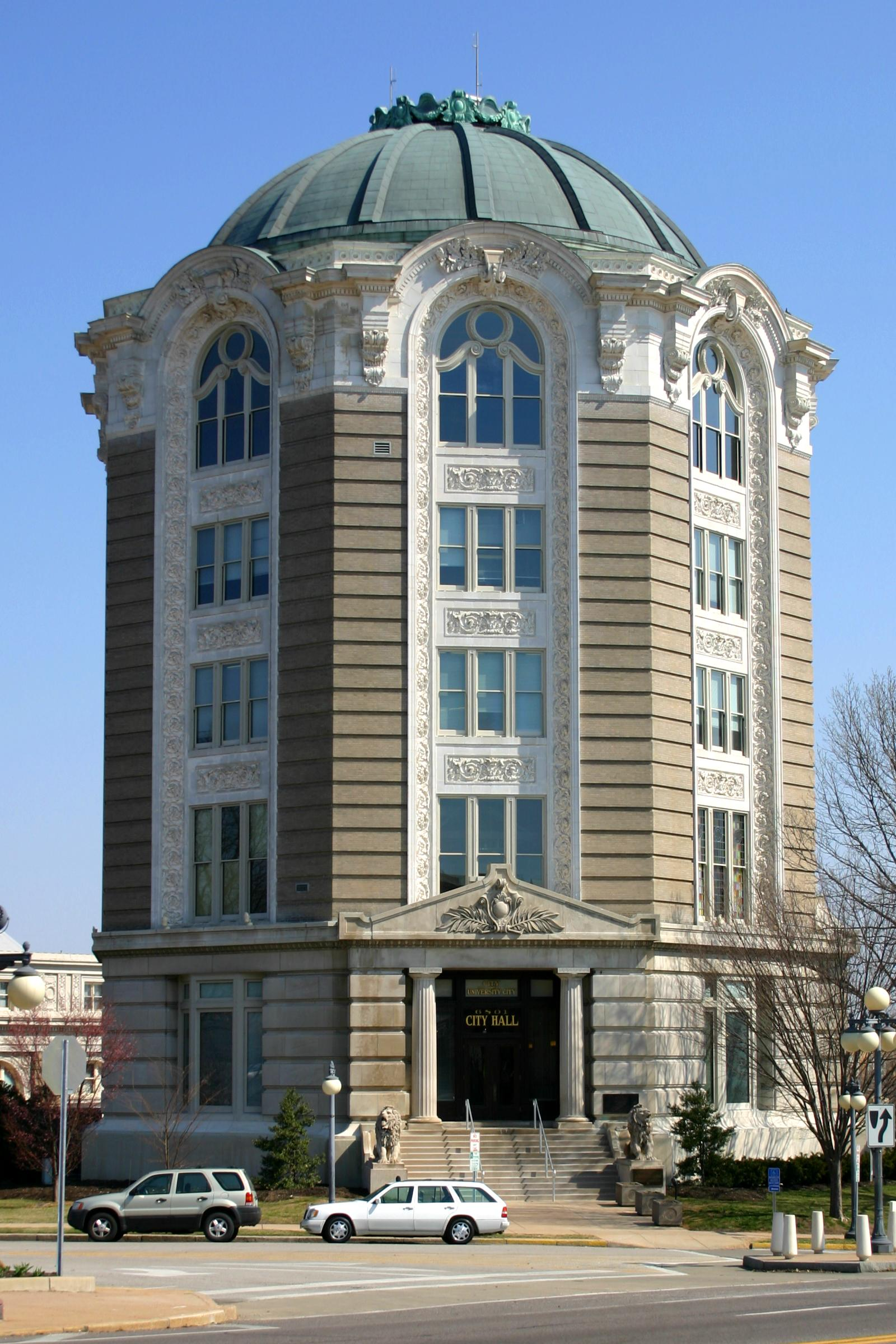
University City City Hall

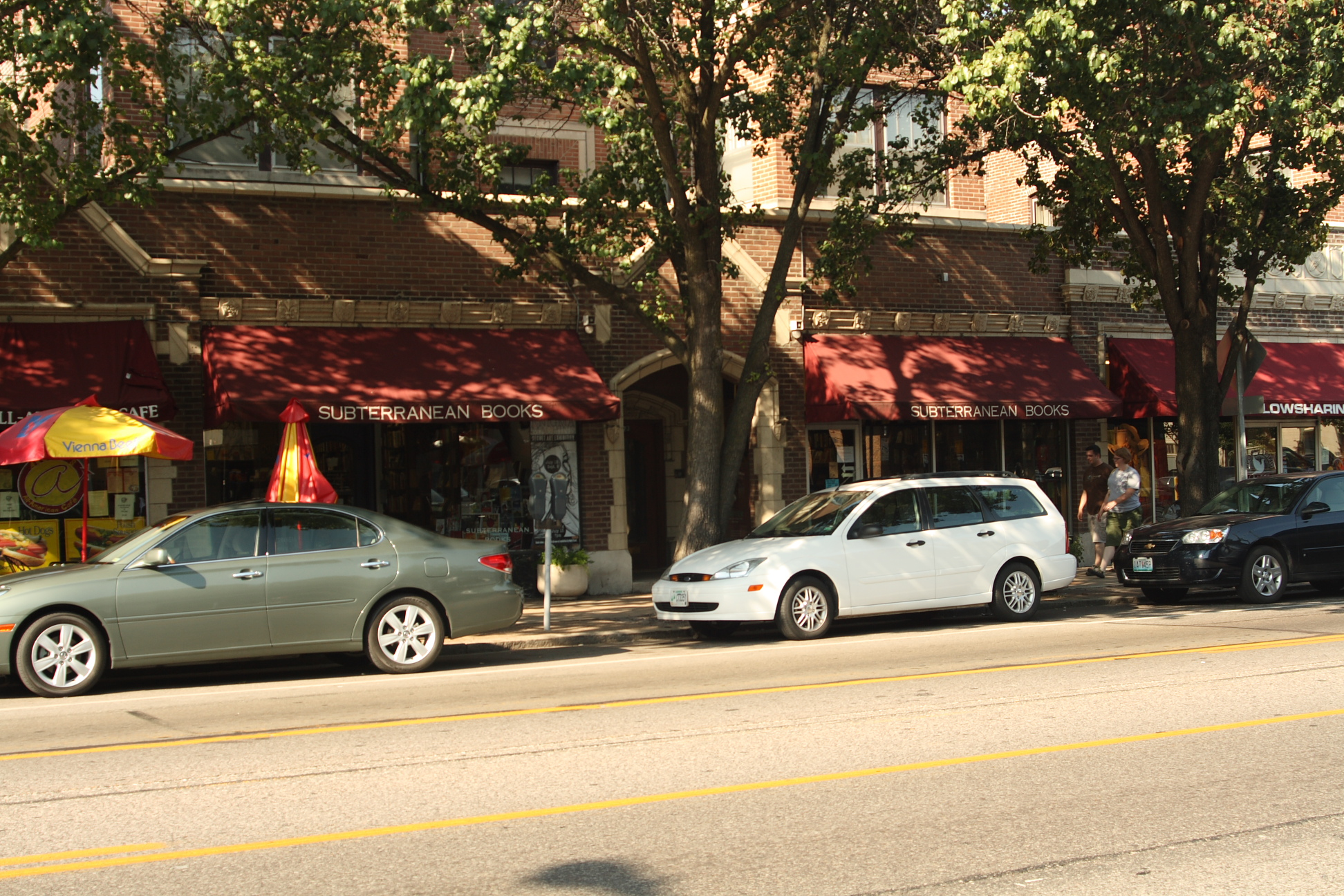
Subterranean Books

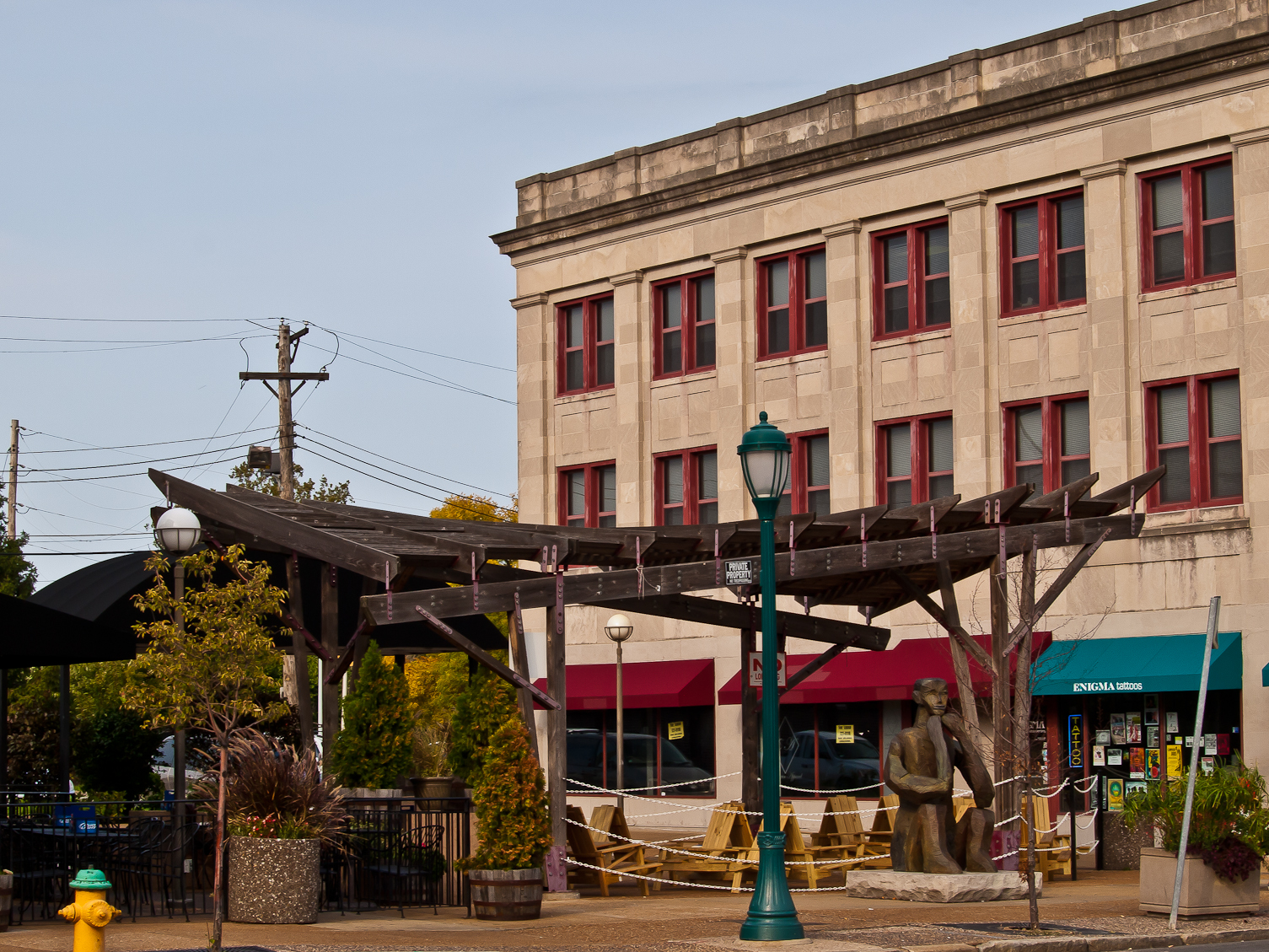
Northeast block of Delmar and Kingsland

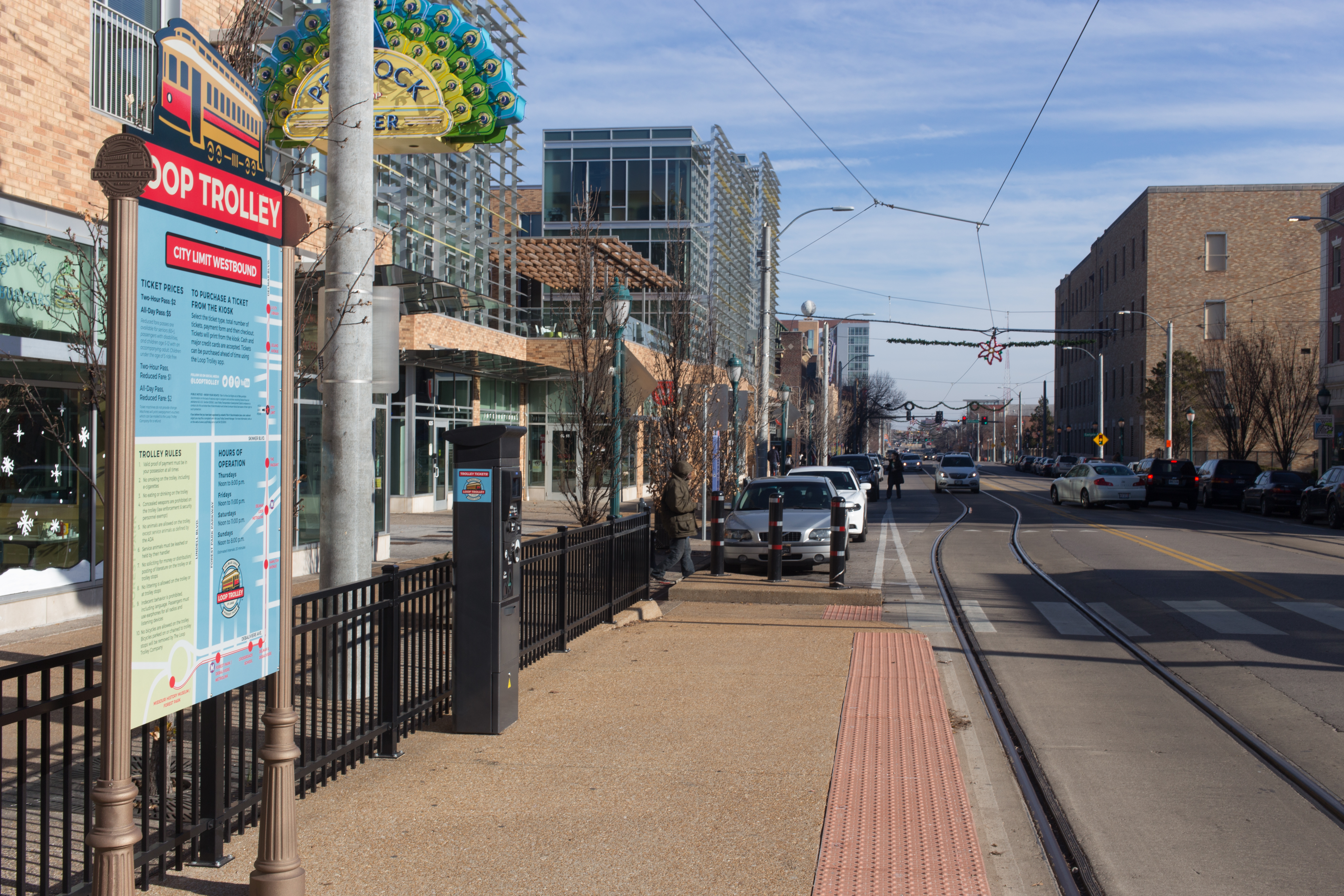
The Lofts of Washington University

== See also ==
- Streetcars in St. Louis
