= St. Louis Walk of Fame =

Coordinates: 38.6560°N 90.3049°W

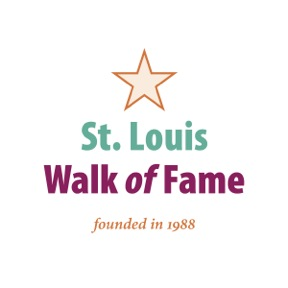
- St. Louis Walk of Fame logo
- Sponsored by: Established by Joe Edwards
- Location: St. Louis, Missouri and University City, Missouri
- Country: United States
- Rewards: Brass star and bronze plaque embedded into the sidewalk along Delmar Boulevard
- First award: 1989
- Website: stlouiswalkoffame.org

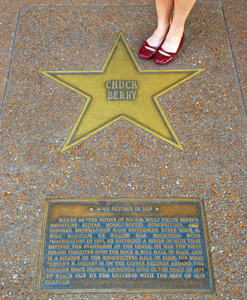
Chuck Berry's star in the St. Louis Walk of Fame

The St. Louis Walk of Fame honors notable people from St. Louis, Missouri, who made contributions to the culture of the United States. All inductees were either born in the Greater St. Louis area or spent their formative or creative years there. Contribution can be in any area; most of the current inductees made their achievements in acting, entertainment, music, sports, art/architecture, broadcasting, journalism, science/education and literature.

As of April 2019, the walk has more than 150 brass stars and bronze plaques, each bearing an inscription of an inductee's name and a summary of their accomplishments. The stars and plaques are set into the sidewalks along a 2/3-mile (1 km) stretch of Delmar Boulevard in the Delmar Loop area, spanning the border between St. Louis and University City.

== History ==
The walk was founded by developer Joe Edwards, owner of Blueberry Hill pub/restaurant and other establishments located along the walk. Its first stars and plaques were installed in 1989; the inductees that year were musician Chuck Berry, dancer and choreographer Katherine Dunham, bridge builder James B. Eads, poet T. S. Eliot, ragtime composer Scott Joplin, aviator Charles Lindbergh, baseball player Stan Musial, actor Vincent Price, newspaper publisher Joseph Pulitzer and playwright Tennessee Williams. Ten more were selected for each of the next four years (in order to get the walk established), but starting in 1994 no more than three have been awarded in any year.

Cedric the Entertainer received the first star and plaque located in the City of St. Louis part of the loop, in May of 2008. The walk, and the boundaries of the Delmar Loop in general, have been expanded eastward by Edwards in recent years, as Edwards continues to invest in the area's redevelopment.

== Selection process ==
Anyone can submit a nomination by mail by supplying basic identification information as well as a description of the nominee's accomplishments and connection to St. Louis. About 30 to 40 finalists are culled from the nominees by the walk's founder and director; the finalists are sent to a selection committee of 120 St. Louisans. The selection committee has been variously described as:

- "the chancellors of all area universities, key people from local libraries, arts organizations and historical societies, media journalists, and other citizens with an informed understanding of St. Louis' cultural heritage;"

or

- "university chancellors, previous inductees and representatives of arts organizations, historical societies and libraries."

Prior to 2007, the open-air induction ceremony was held regularly on the third week of May; since then, it is held on a less regular basis, subject to the availability of those being inducted.

Some of the walk's inductees, including Dick Gregory, Jackie Joyner-Kersee, and Ozzie Smith, are also in the nearby, unrelated Gateway Classic Hall of Fame.

== Inductees ==
- Maya Angelou
- Henry Armstrong
- Josephine Baker
- Scott Bakula
- Fontella Bass
- Mel Bay
- James "Cool Papa" Bell
- Thomas Hart Benton
- Yogi Berra
- Chuck Berry
- Susan Blow
- Christine Brewer
- Lou Brock
- Robert S. Brookings
- Jack Buck
- Grace Bumbry
- T Bone Burnett
- William S. Burroughs
- Harry Caray
- Cedric the Entertainer (Cedric Antonio Kyles)
- Kate Chopin
- Auguste Chouteau
- William Clark
- Bill Clay (William L. Clay)
- Barry Commoner
- Arthur Holly Compton
- Jimmy Connors
- Carl and Gerty Cori
- Bob Costas
- John Danforth
- William Danforth
- Dwight Davis
- Miles Davis
- Dizzy Dean
- Dan Dierdorf
- Phyllis Diller
- Rose Philippine Duchesne
- Katherine Dunham
- Robert Duvall
- James B. Eads
- Tom Eagleton
- Charles Eames
- Gerald Early
- Buddy Ebsen
- T. S. Eliot
- William Greenleaf Eliot
- Stanley Elkin
- Mary Engelbreit
- Walker Evans
- Lee Falk
- Eugene Field
- The Fifth Dimension
- Curt Flood
- Redd Foxx
- David Francis
- Frankie Muse Freeman
- Joe Garagiola
- Dave Garroway
- William Gass
- Martha Gellhorn
- Bob Gibson
- John Goodman
- Betty Grable
- Evarts Graham
- Ulysses S. Grant
- Dick Gregory
- Charles Guggenheim
- Robert Guillaume
- Henry Hampton
- Walker Hancock
- John Hartford
- Donny Hathaway
- Whitey Herzog
- Al Hirschfeld
- William Holden
- Rogers Hornsby
- A. E. Hotchner
- William Inge
- Hale Irwin
- The Isley Brothers
- William B. Ittner
- Johnnie Johnson
- Scott Joplin
- Elizabeth Keckley
- Jackie Joyner-Kersee
- Albert King
- Kevin Kline
- Pierre Laclede
- Rocco Landesman
- Rita Levi-Montalcini
- Charles Lindbergh
- Theodore Link
- Elijah Lovejoy
- Ed Macauley
- Marsha Mason
- Masters and Johnson (William H. Masters and Virginia E. Johnson)
- Bill Mauldin
- Virginia Mayo
- Tim McCarver
- Michael McDonald
- Robert McFerrin Sr.
- David Merrick
- Archie Moore
- Marianne Moore
- Agnes Moorehead
- Stan Musial
- Nelly (Cornell Iral Haynes Jr.)
- Howard Nemerov
- Butch O'Hare
- Gyo Obata
- Ridley Pearson
- Marlin Perkins
- Mike Peters
- Bob Pettit
- Vincent Price
- Joseph Pulitzer
- Harold Ramis
- Judy Rankin
- Peter Raven
- Paul C. Reinert
- Branch Rickey
- The Rockettes
- Irma S. Rombauer
- Janice Rule
- Charles M. Russell
- David Sanborn
- Red Schoendienst
- Dred and Harriet Scott
- Ntozake Shange
- Henry Shaw
- William T. Sherman
- George Sisler
- Leonard Slatkin
- Jackie Smith
- Ozzie Smith
- Willie Mae Ford Smith
- Max Starkloff
- Sara Teasdale
- Clark Terry
- Kay Thompson
- Henry Townsend
- Helen Traubel
- Ernest Trova
- Ike Turner
- Tina Turner
- Mona Van Duyn
- Dick Weber
- Mary Wickes
- Tennessee Williams
- Carl Wimar
- Shelley Winters
- Harriett Woods
- Chic Young

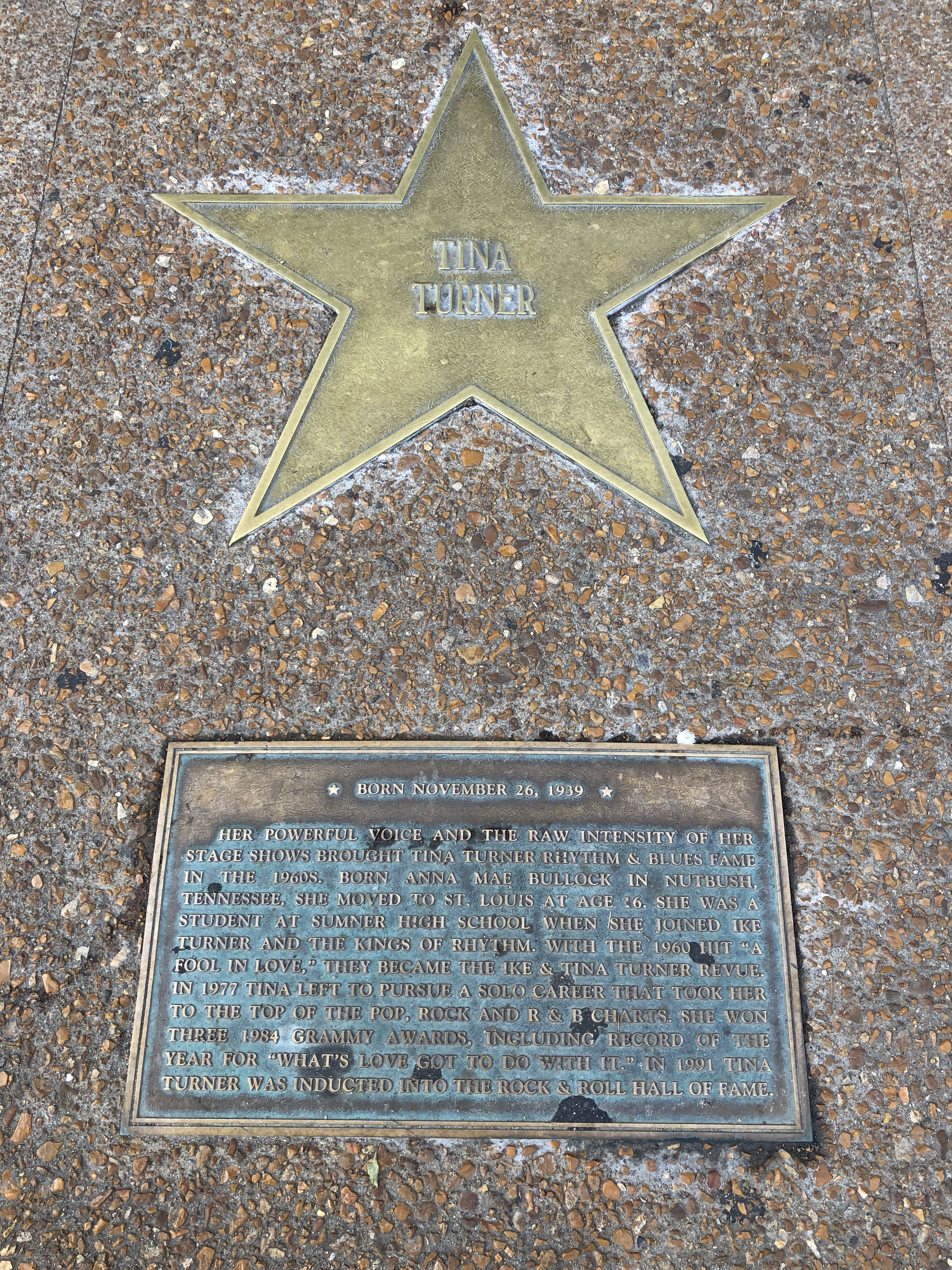
Tina Turner star on the St. Louis Walk of Fame in University City, Missouri

== See also ==
- List of awards for contributions to culture
- List of halls and walks of fame
- List of people from St. Louis
