= East St. Louis and Suburban Railway =

Defunct American Railroad

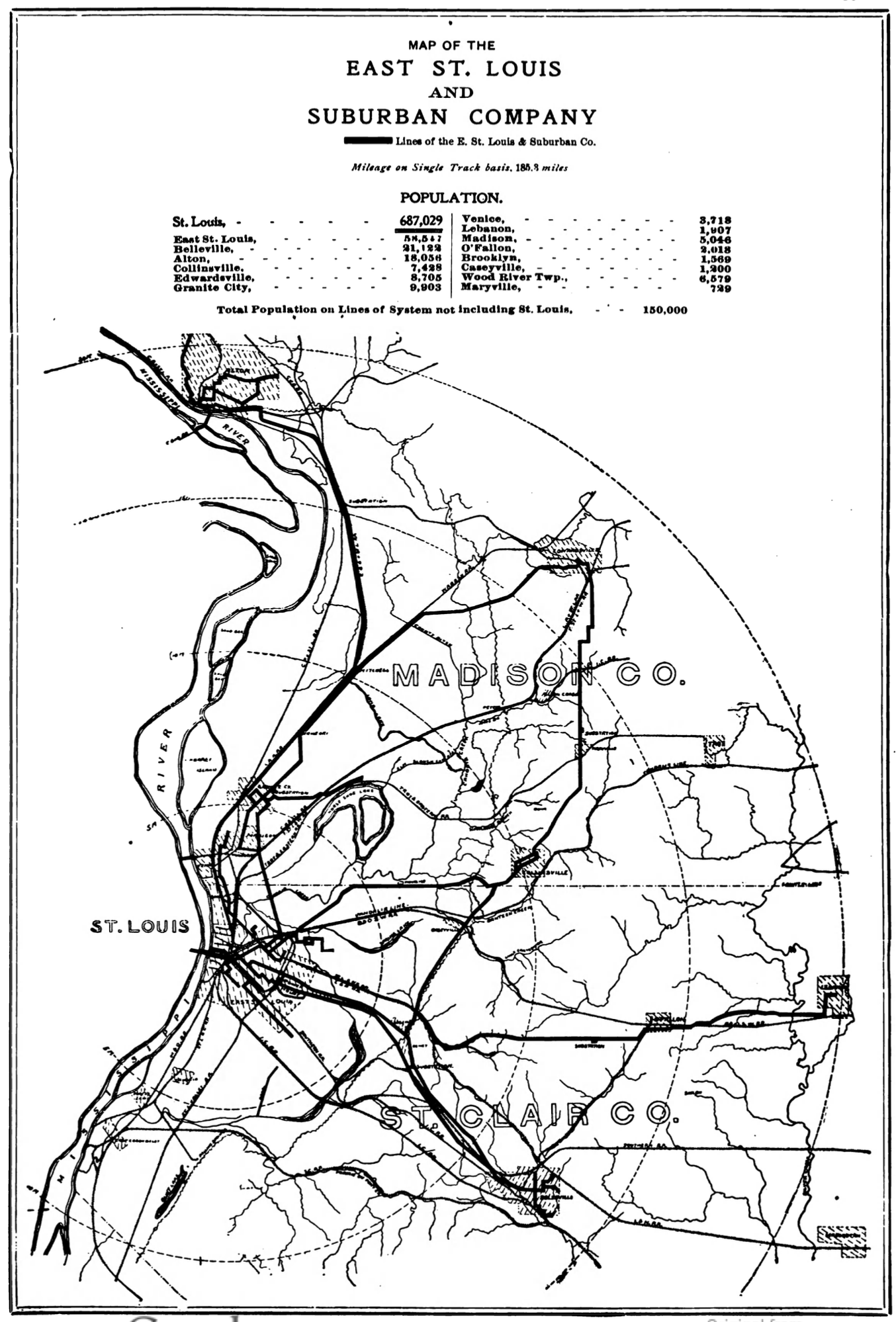
Map of the East St. Louis and Suburban Company c. 1912

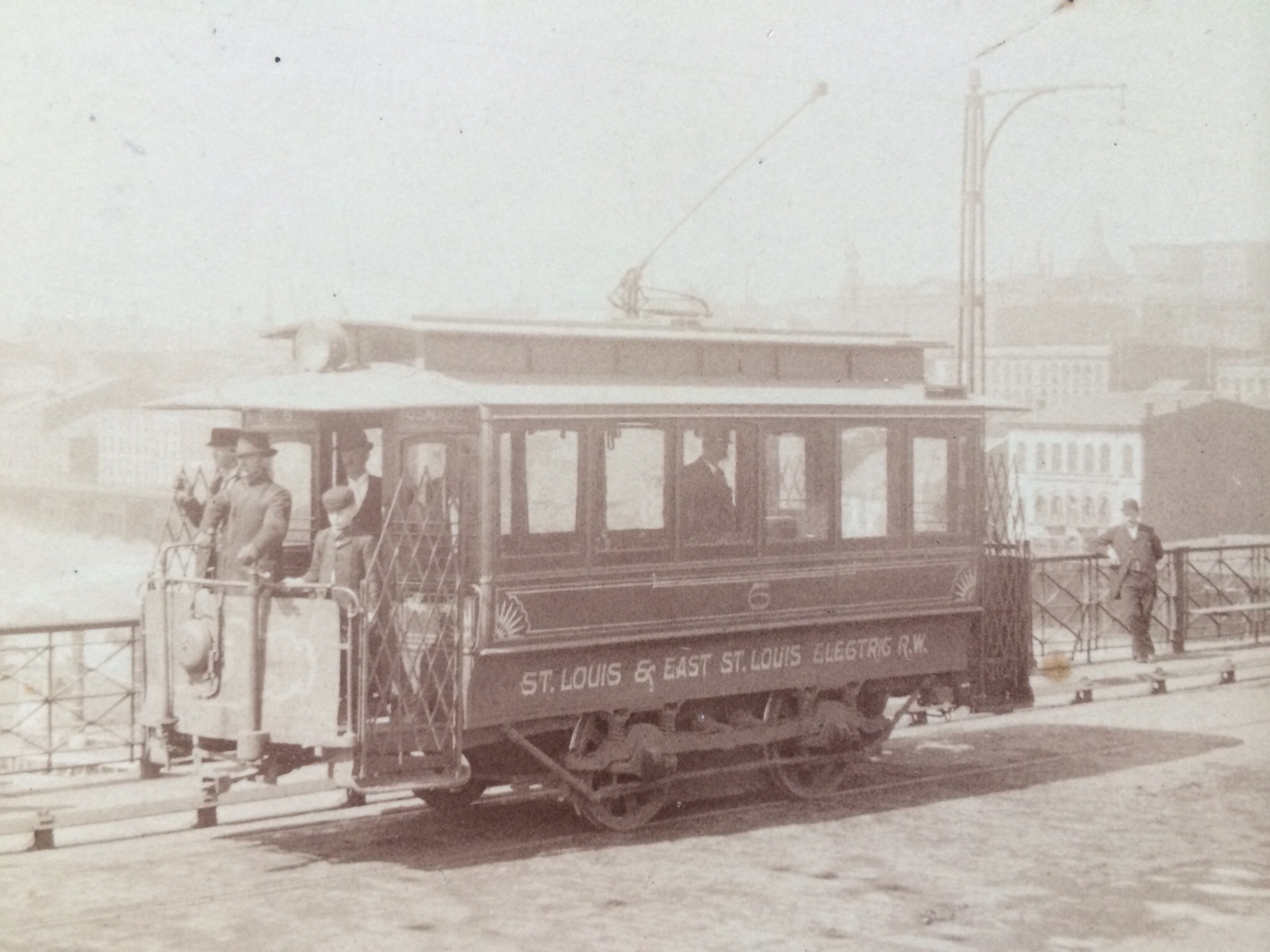
Taken on Eads Bridge May 26, 1896

The East St. Louis and Suburban Railway was an interurban railroad that operated in Illinois.

== Route ==
It served Madison County, St. Clair County, and Monroe County as part of the great "East Side Electric Railway System." It stretched from the Eads Bridge, which crossed the Mississippi River from East St. Louis, Illinois to St. Louis, Missouri, east to Lebanon, and from Alton, to Waterloo. This railroad moved commuters and express freight among various towns in the East St. Louis area including Belleville, Collinsville, Waterloo, Columbia, Granite City, National City, French Village, and O'Fallon.

== History ==
The system expanded during the industrial growth of St. Louis in the late 19th century, spilling across the Mississippi River to the cheaper land on the Illinois side. From 1870 to 1910, East St. Louis and the surrounding area attracted industrial development to the transportation hub. During this period, the population of East St. Louis nearly doubled each decade. Amidst this growth, the East St. Louis and Suburban was incorporated in 1890, and grew by acquiring shorter interurban lines. These included:

- The East St. Louis Electric Railway, which began operating its own cars in East St. Louis in 1890, with current furnished from its own power station.
- The St. Louis and East St. Louis Electric Railway, which began operating across the Eads Bridge in 1890. This company had its own power station at the east pier of the bridge.
- The St. Louis and Belleville Electric Railway, built in 1896 and 1897, which operated over a private right of way Between St. Louis and Belleville. It also owned the local lines in Belleville. Its power station was located on the bluffs, one mile east of Edgemont. By 1904, the line was operated as a coal road with electric locomotives.
- The East St. Louis and Suburban Railway, which in 1897 constructed its double track road between East St. Louis and Belleville along the Belleville Turnpike. Its power station was situated in Edgemont.
- The Colinsville, Caseyville and East St. Louis Electric Railway, which built its line in 1899 between Collinsville and Edgemont. Power was supplied via the St. Louis and Belleville Electric Railway.
- The Mississippi Valley Traction Company, which built a line from East St. Louis to Collinsville in 1901; this was later extended from Collinsville to Edwardsville. Its power station was located one mile west of Collinsvile.
- The St. Louis, O'Fallon and Lebanon Electric Railroad, which in 1903 built a line from Edgemont to O'Fallon and Lebanon. It was supplied power via a sub-station. Its roadbed, trestles, and bridges were constructed with a view of supporting heavy freight traffic.
- Subsequently, the property of the Citizens Electric Light and Power Company, including the power house, was acquired.

The Illinois Traction System reached St. Louis via trackage rights on the East St. Louis and Suburban over the Eads Bridge until the completion of the McKinley Bridge. The Illinois Terminal Railroad later purchased the Alton Line. The East St. Louis and Suburban shared a car barn on Ridge Avenue in East St. Louis with the St. Louis and Belleville Electric Railway, which was also part of the Great East Side Electric Railway System. The lines to Belleville, Edwardsville, and the line between Edgemont and Collinsville were originally laid to a track gauge of 4 ft 10 in (1,473 mm) so that cars could run directly on St. Louis streetcar tracks and over the Eads Bridge. Those lines were converted to standard gauge in 1905 with virtually no interruption in service. The system was abandoned in sections during the 1930s.
