= Blueberry Hill (restaurant) =

Coordinates: 38°39′21″N 90°18′18″W

- Interactive map of Blueberry Hill

Restaurant information
- Established: September 8, 1972
- Location: 6504 Delmar Blvd., University City, Missouri, 63130, United States
- Website: www.blueberryhill.com

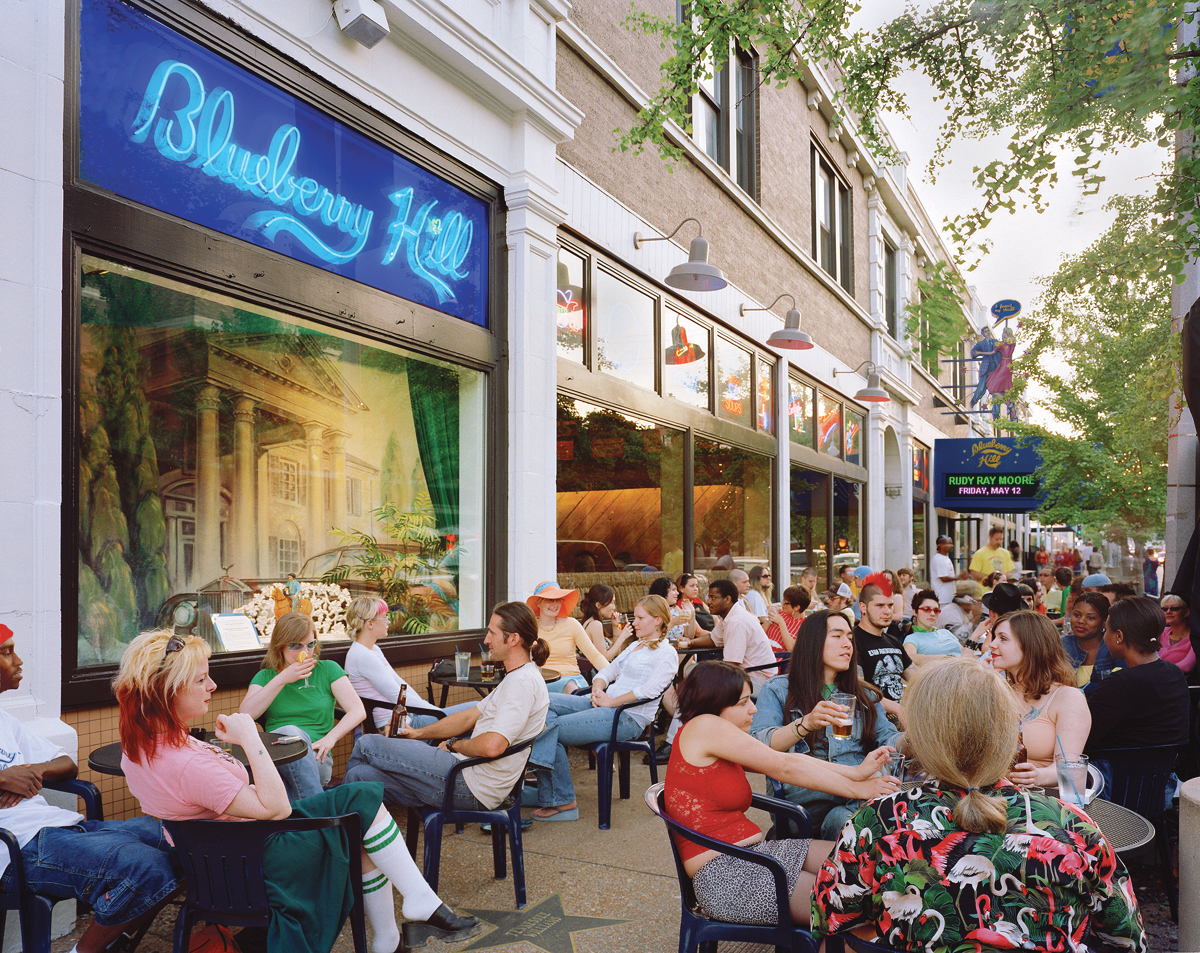
Blueberry Hill in St. Louis

Blueberry Hill is a restaurant and music club located in the Delmar Loop neighborhood in University City, a suburb of St. Louis, Missouri. Until October 2014, Chuck Berry performed there the third Wednesday of each month, in the Duck Room.

The restaurant is considered a St. Louis landmark, drawing tourists and locals during the day, and then becoming a popular hangout for university students in the evening, mostly from nearby Washington University. The restaurant is famous for its decor, its cheeseburger and its darts room.

Joe Edwards and Linda Edwards opened Blueberry Hill on September 8, 1972. Since opening, the restaurant has expanded into the adjacent spaces on the east and the west, and it now occupies an entire block of Delmar Boulevard.

Outside the restaurant is the St. Louis Walk of Fame, the work of Joe Edwards. The Walk lines the sidewalks on both sides of Delmar, and is made up of bronze stars and informative biographical plaques honoring individuals from the St. Louis area who have made major national contributions to US cultural heritage.
