= Streetcars in St. Louis =

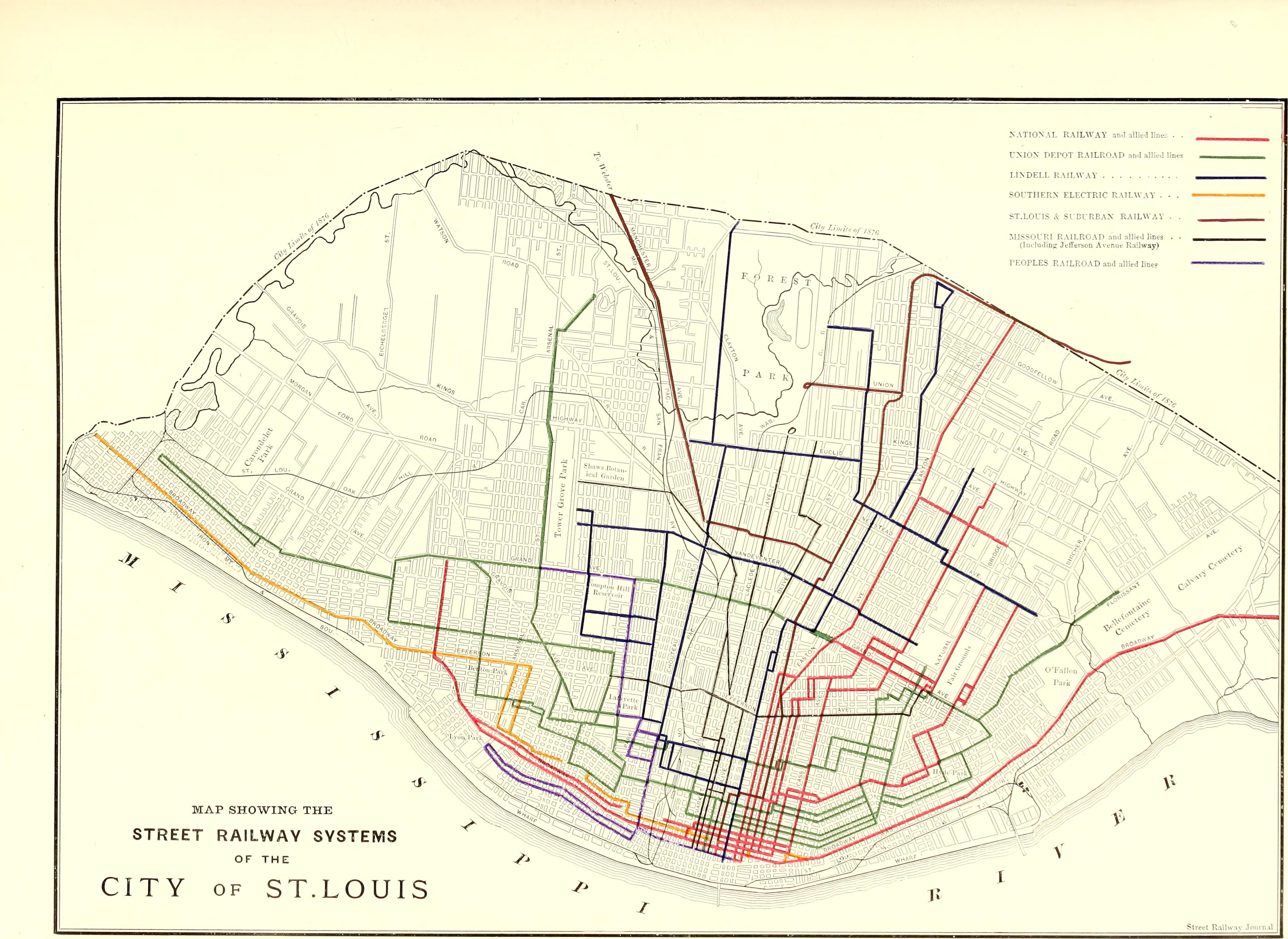
Street railway systems of St. Louis in 1884

Streetcars in St. Louis, Missouri operated as part of the transportation network of St. Louis from the middle of the 19th century through the early 1960s.

During the first forty years of the streetcar in the city, a variety of private companies operated several dozen lines. In 1898, the City of St. Louis passed a Central Traction Bill that required franchises for streetcar companies. United Railways quickly consolidated most St. Louis streetcar companies, then St. Louis Suburban in 1906. United Railways sank into receivership which was resolved only in 1924. It was reorganized as St. Louis Public Service Company in 1927, serving the city of St. Louis and neighboring St. Louis County, Missouri. It became Bi-State in 1963. Other private companies, such as those serving the Metro East region or St. Charles, Missouri, continued separate operations.

Streetcars began to be replaced by buses in St. Louis in the 1920s; the last one ran in 1966. Many of today's MetroBus and Madison County Transit bus routes follow the routes and names of streetcar lines.

In 2018, a 2.2-mile (3.5 km), 10-station heritage streetcar line was completed in and near the Delmar Loop area. Since 2022, the Loop Trolley has been operated in summer and fall by the Metro Transit division of the Bi-State Development Agency.

== History ==
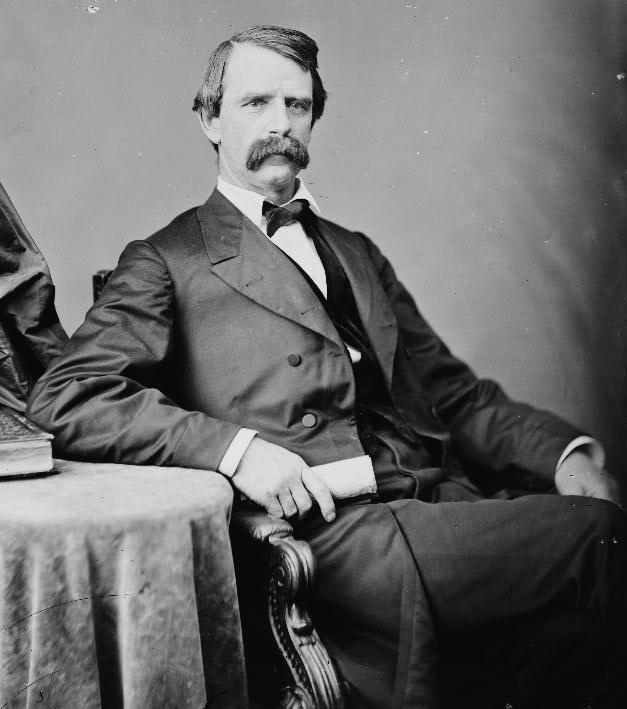
Erastus Wells began an omnibus service in St. Louis in 1843

=== Early public transit ===
By the 1830s, St. Louis had grown beyond the ability of many of its residents to walk conveniently throughout the town. In 1838, brief mention is made in historical records of a private horse-drawn cab service in the city, followed in 1843 by the beginning of an omnibus service by entrepreneur Erastus Wells in partnership with an investor named Calvin Case. During the late 1840s, other horse-drawn omnibus service companies began operation, but by the end of 1850, most of these companies had consolidated with the Case and Wells lines to form Case and Company, which operated 90 carriages and several lines in the city. In 1855, Case was killed in the Gasconade Bridge train disaster, and the company was divided among its other investors. The resulting horse-drawn omnibus lines became the blueprint for horse-drawn street railway service in the late 1850s.

=== Initial street railways ===
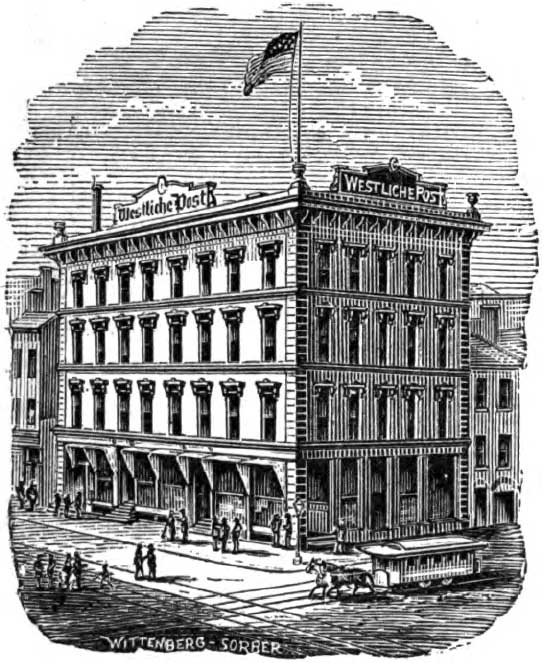
A horsecar passes the Westliche Post offices downtown in 1874

In December 1855, a group of investors formed the Laclede Railway Company to build a horse-drawn street railway modeled on services provided in eastern cities such as New York City, Philadelphia, and Boston. The Laclede line was never built, but by 1859, seven other horsecar lines were proposed. The first of these lines began operation on July 4, 1859, running east to west on Olive Street from 4th to 10th streets. Early operations were marred by difficulty in securing quality rails, and construction problems caused derailments of the cars. Four of the lines were completed before the outbreak of the American Civil War.

After the Civil War, other lines opened in St. Louis that connected the central city with western areas. In 1874, with the opening of the Eads Bridge, a new line connected the city with East St. Louis, Illinois. The first experiments with mechanical traction for the cars took place immediately after the war in 1865 on Grand Avenue; a fully operational steam-powered line opened in 1868 as an extension of the Olive Street line. This line was not operationally connected with the rest of the horse-drawn lines, and it used a different track gauge from them.

Pioneering streetcar lines were laid to the standard track gauge of 4 ft 8 1/2 in (1,435 mm). The use of untreated railroad ties led to widespread track drift, and eventually a gauge of 4 ft 10 in (1,473 mm) was adopted to account for the discrepancies without rebuilding the tracks. This would become the predominant local track gauge in St. Louis.

=== Consolidation ===
Beginning in the 1890s, many U.S. cities began to consolidate their streetcar companies, St. Louis among them. St. Louis & Suburban was created in 1890 when a Boston syndicate bought the Cable & Western Railway, the first cable line (of six) in St. Louis.

On April 13, 1898, the city of St. Louis passed the Central Traction Bill, granting a consolidated company the right to run on other company's tracks, to acquire other companies, and gave it a 50-year franchise. Thus began the era of monopolies, many being funded by syndicates, often amid allegations of bribery. The bill resulted in the formation of St. Louis United Railways which operated as St. Louis Traction Company. Brown Bros. & Co. of New York City controlling most of St. Louis United's stock. Most St. Louis streetcar companies, including Lindell, joined the traction company.

This consolidation prompted a strike among streetcar workers that lasted for months in 1900. Companies were accused of hiring non-union workers. In May, a dynamite explosion damaged the Houseman line in Webster Groves.

In 1903, Suburban had 93 miles (150 km) of track, and was readying for the St. Louis World's Fair, highlighting the Kirkwood-Ferguson line and Forest Park line from Brentwood. After the 1904 World's Fair, ridership continued to increase, during what was regarded as the heyday for the streetcars.

In 1905, United Railways was acquired by North American Company which also owned Laclede Gas and Union Electric. On December 31, 1906, Suburban, the city's last independent streetcar company, was acquired by United.

As automobiles became more numerous, ridership declined. United Railways stopped making a profit and couldn't pay the city's mill fare tax. On March 9, 1918, the city reached an agreement with United. The nickel fare would be raised to 6¢, the mill tax would be removed, the company would pay 0.5% of gross earnings to the city, and the $2.3 million due the city would be paid out of earnings over 7% of their $60 million assessed value. The public was outraged (probably at the fare increase).

A referendum petition cancelling the agreement was prepared, but was stolen by burglars who drilled a safe where it was stored in the Cigarmakers Union office. United refused to honor the agreement. A compromise was reached in January 1919. The company would pay the back mill tax in 10 annual payments of $250K with interest. Again the public was outraged. Mayor Kiel maintained he was elected in 1917 to resolve the United issue. This time, recall petitions were circulated for his removal.

In 1919, United filed for bankruptcy. Richard McCulloch, president of United Railways, was to be tried for burglary in the theft of the referendum petitions. The very complex bankruptcy involving numerous bonds was finally settled in 1924.

In 1926, United raised fares from 7 to 8 cents or 15 cents for two rides. The company reorganized again in 1927, and United Railways was taken over by St. Louis Public Service Company at midnight on November 30.

=== Decline ===
In the 1920s, streetcars began to be replaced by motor buses that could route freely over public streets, paying only vehicle and gas taxes, while streetcar operators had fixed routes by the tracks, and had to pay additional property taxes for the infrastructure they placed in the road. The construction of Highway I-70 through downtown St. Louis, ended service to many street lines.

The last St. Louis streetcar route in operation was the 15 Hodiamont line, which ceased service on May 21, 1966.

== List of streetcar companies ==
Railroads and companies serving the St. Louis metro area included:

- Baden and St. Louis Railroad
- Benton and Bellefontaine Railroad
- Citizens Railway
- Cass Avenue and Fairgrounds Railroad
- Forest Park and Clayton Railroad
- Lindell Railroad
- Midland Street Railway
- Missouri Railroad
- Peoples Railway Company
- St. Louis and Kirkwood Railway
- St. Louis and Suburban Railway
- St. Louis Railroad
- St. Louis, St. Charles and Western Railway
- St. Louis Public Service Company
- Southern Electric Railway
- Tower Grove and Lafayette Railway Company
- Union Railroad
- Union Depot Railroad
- Belleville Electric Railway Company
- East St. Louis and Suburban Railway Company
- East St. Louis Railway Company
- Illinois Traction Company
- Alton, Jacksonville and Peoria Railway Company
- East St. Louis, Columbia and Waterloo Railway Company

=== Fleets ===
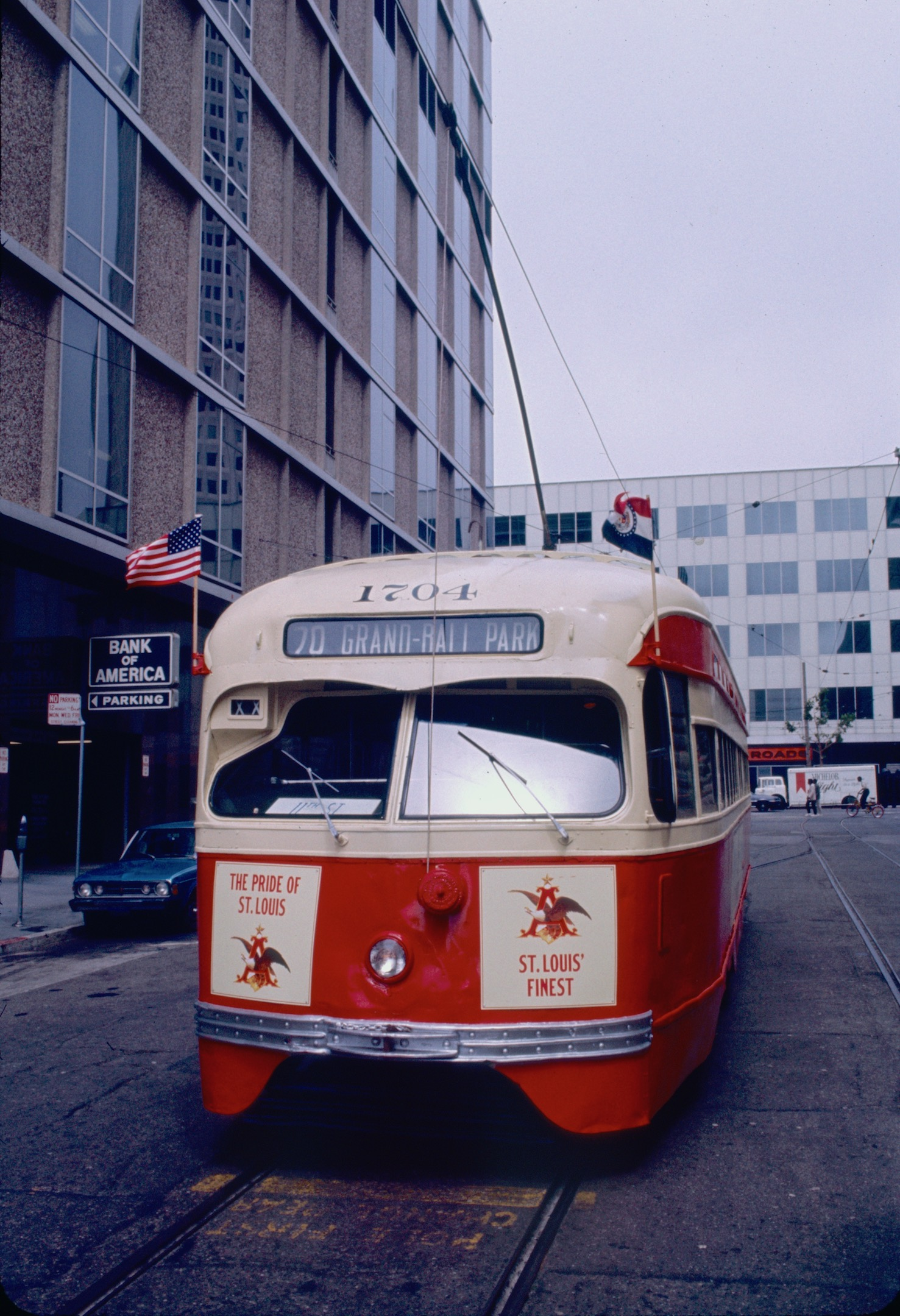
A former St. Louis PCC streetcar in service in San Francisco during the 1983 Historic Trolley Festival

From 1927 to 1951, the St. Louis Public Service Company ran Peter Witt streetcars built by United at its 39th Street shops.

In the 1940s, the company ordered three sets of PCC (Presidents Conference Committee) cars from the St. Louis Car Company: 1500, 1600 and 1700 Series, ordered in 1940, 1946, and sometime in between. In 1957, the company 1700 series PCC cars to the San Francisco Municipal Railway, which changed their numbers to the 1100 series and operated them until 1982.

== Routes ==
The route numbering system of St. Louis streetcars was released by Public Service Co on June 28, 1929.

=== #1 Kirkwood–Ferguson ===
The #1 Kirkwood line going south from Brentwood crossed Deer Creek through the Tuxedo Park section of Webster and roughly followed Kirkham to Kirkwood. Going north the route followed E. Linden Ave through Richmond Heights and connected with #14 University (Clayton) at Clayton Rd. Then north on Central Ave through Clayton turning east at Pershing Ave to Skinker, connecting to #16 City Line Ferguson. The south end of #16 is the Maplewood loop at Yale and Manchester.

The #1 Kirkwood line was built by the St. Louis and Kirkwood Railroad, a subsidiary of St. Louis and Suburban Railroad, as the Brentwood, Clayton, and St. Louis Railroad Co. to connect the Houseman Airline in Brentwood with the university (Clayton) line. Sometimes known as the Brentwood extension, this line gave access from Clayton to Kirkwood and the Meramec Highlands. Connections allowed travel as far north as Ferguson.

In September 1898, the St. Louis and Kirkwood Railroad and Suburban was franchised to build a line south on Central Avenue through Clayton. This was next to track used by the Lindell system for its Clayton and Forest Park Railroad. In April 1899, the St. Louis and Kirkwood Railroad Co transferred its franchise for a cross county line to the Brentwood, Clayton, and St. Louis Railroad Co. By July, the route was being surveyed. Cars began running in June, 1900.

In 1902, St. Louis County listed the assessments of St. Louis and Suburban lines as:

- St. Louis and Kirkwood; 12.47 mi; $9000/mi
- St. Louis and Meramec; 13.44 mi; $12500/mi
- Brentwood, Clayton and St. Louis; 12.29 mi; $9000/mi; assessed for the first time at $110,000

In 1947, Public Service requested permission to replace streetcars with buses. The Kirkwood line ended August 2, 1950.

=== #53, 54, 55, 56 Manchester lines ===
In 1895, a second route to Kirkwood began operations. It ran south on Sarah Street from the Olive Street line to Manchester Road, west to Sutton and the Sutton Loop. From there it took a southerly route west on Flora, south on Summit, west on Lockwood running into Adams. To reach Webster the route crossed Edgebrook trestle over the Missouri Pacific tracks and Deer Creek. Young describes it as “one of the most substantial pieces of trolley engineering in North America.” The Manchester routes were sometimes called Meramec lines and initially was called the Howard line. They too joined the Suburban system letting Suburban dominate streetcar service to Kirkwood. The powerhouse in Brentwood also supplied power to the Meramec Highland Division (#55 & 56).

The Manchester routes converted to buses on April 2, 1949.

=== #57 Brentwood ===
Less well known is #57 Brentwood line. It began near where Brentwood Boulevard crosses the Missouri Pacific tracks and ran northeast crossing Hanley Road just north of Manchester and then through Maplewood and Richmond Heights on Lindbergh Drive to the loop on Dale Avenue a few blocks east of Big Bend at Murphy and Hawthorne (now mostly under Highway 40). The loop was the west end of #51 Forest Park, which ran east on Oakland, north on Euclid and then downtown on Laclede.

The Brentwood line was built as the St. Louis and Kirkwood Railway. James Houseman was the major investor. The line was known as the Houseman Airline. The Forest Park connection was an extension of the Lindell line's Chouteau Division. From Forest Park at the city limit it ran to the Dale Avenue loop over Wise Ave south of St. Mary's Hospital.

Lindell was closely involved in the construction of the line. George W. Baumhoff, a Lindell executive, acted as General Contractor to build the Brentwood line. Lindell also loaned cars for use on the Airline before its cars were ready. Surveying was begun in 1892. Lindell and Houseman ran an excursion train on the new line on February 2, 1896, from 3rd and Washington in downtown St. Louis to Kirkwood and then Meramec Highlands and back. August A. Busch was one of the guests. The trip included a stop at the new Brentwood powerhouse near the Missouri Pacific tracks and Brentwood Boulevard in Brentwood.

On March 8, the Houseman Airline had a disastrous head-on when two streetcars collided on their single track line killing three. Ignoring orders, the motorman of the west bound car raced past a siding thinking he could beat the opposing car to the next siding. Lawsuits from the accident forced St. Louis and Kirkwood Electric Railway into receivership.

In May 1896, JD Houseman leased the line from its creditors. He promised to double track the line and to add more cars. The Houseman Airline was acquired by Suburban in May 1897. A photo of the Brentwood line taken from the Terminal Railroad overpass shows that section was still single track in 1947. According to Young, the Brentwood to Kirkwood section was double tracked in 1905. A 1947 photo of Brentwood junction shows both lines doubled.

In 1947, Public Service requested permission to replace streetcars on five lines with buses. The Brentwood line was mentioned specifically. Bus service began January 30, 1949. The route was Forest Park Streetcar Loop on Dale west to Big Bend, south to Folk, west to Laclede Station, south to Manchester, west to High School Drive, north to Litzsinger, east to Brentwood, south to Manchester then return over the same route.

== Heritage line ==
In 2018, a 2.2-mile (3.5 km) heritage trolley line opened to connect the old trolley loop area in University City with the Missouri History Museum in Forest Park. The Loop Trolley shut down in 2019 after ridership and revenue fell far short of projections, but was reopened in 2022 after the federal government threatened to demand the return of funds used to build it. It is currently operated in summer and fall by the Metro Transit division of the Bi-State Development Agency.

The Loop Trolley takes its name from the Delmar Loop, which was itself named for a loop of track on the 10 Delmar Streetcar line, which ran its last trip on April 19, 1964. In the early 20th century, the Loop was adjacent to the Delmar Gardens Amusement Park. Until its abandonment on July 25, 1950, the loop was also the terminus of the 05 Creve Coeur Lake line famous for its open "moonlight" cars.

Two other 21st-century proposals to revive streetcar service in the St. Louis area failed: the St. Charles City Streetcar, which would have run an 8-mile (13 km) route from New Town to St. Charles, Missouri; and a proposed 7-mile (11 km) streetcar system to connect Downtown St. Louis to the Central West End, Downtown West, Midtown, and Carr Square.

== See also ==
- List of streetcar systems in the United States
- Streetcar strikes in the United States
- Streetcars in North America
- Robert Guillaume - actor worked as St. Louis streetcar motorman and first African American to do so.
