= City Hall (University City, Missouri) =

- University City City Hall
- U.S. Historic district – Contributing property
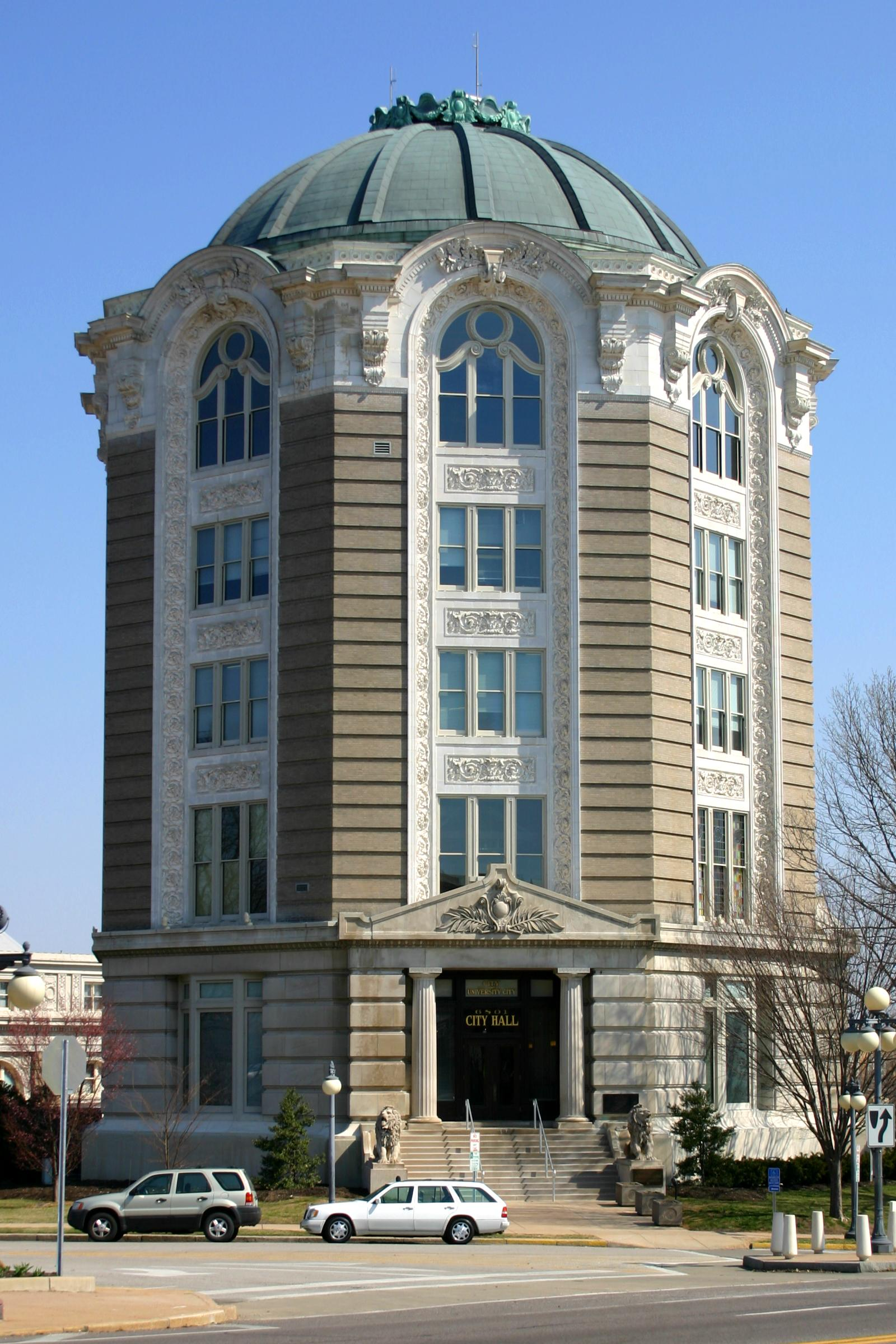
- University City City Hall

- Location within St. Louis Location within Missouri Location within the United States
- Location: Roughly bounded by Delmar Blvd., Trinity, Harvard, and Kingsland Aves., University City, Missouri
- Coordinates: 38.6569°N 90.3104°W
- Area: 8.7 acres (3.5 ha)
- Built: 1902
- Architect: Chivers, Herbert C.
- Architectural style: Beaux-Arts
- Part of: University City Plaza (ID75002092)
- Added to NRHP: March 7, 1975

The City Hall of University City, Missouri, the seat of municipal government for University City, Missouri, was built in 1903 as the Woman's Magazine Building, the headquarters of a magazine publishing company, and became a city hall in 1930. The building is part of the University City Plaza, which was added to the National Register of Historic Places on March 7, 1975.

== History ==
The current University City City Hall building was built by magazine publisher and businessman Edward Gardner Lewis, a native of Connecticut who came to St. Louis, Missouri, in the late 1890s, selling insect extermination products and medicines that were said to be highly questionable. He bought a magazine called Winner, based in downtown St. Louis, which he renamed Woman's Magazine and quickly built its circulation to the largest in the country, amassing a fortune in the process. In 1902, Lewis purchased 85 acres (344,000 m^{2}) several miles west of downtown St. Louis. The tract, located near the construction site of the World's Fair, would become the nucleus for the streetcar suburb of University City.

In 1903, with his publishing operation outgrowing its downtown location, Lewis began the construction of a new Lewis Publishing Company headquarters and Press Annex at this site. After incorporating University City in 1906, he served three terms as mayor. During this time, he built the Woman's Magazine Building, an Egyptian temple and an Art Academy. But Lewis' financial empire in Missouri collapsed amid charges of mail fraud, bankruptcy, and litigation, and by 1915, he had moved his base of operations to Atascadero, California. Lewis declared bankruptcy a second time in 1924.

The Magazine Building briefly sat vacant until it was dedicated as the new city hall on November 1, 1930.

=== 2000s renovation ===
By 2000, the building's exterior displayed wear and tear. The building underwent refurbishment in the mid-2000s, funded by a $2.9 billion bond measure passed in 2004. The project, led by Architect Trivers Associates, brought the building into compliance with the Americans With Disabilities Act (ADA) and led to LEED certification. To achieve LEED certification, a new HVAC system and water saving measures were installed. The renovations also included exterior tuckpointing and the replacement of the windows and historic restoration of the original wooden window sashes.

== Architecture ==
The octagonal, five-story brick-and-limestone building was built in a Beaux-Arts style with a dome roof. It was designed by Herbert C. Chivers (1869–1946), a local architect who had helped draft plans for St. Louis' Union Station. Its landscaping was done in 1907 by landscape architect George E. Kessler.

A marble staircase connects the first and second floors. A central rotunda under a large dome on the top floor serves as the council chambers.

Among the architectural details that have been removed from the building are terra cotta cherubs along its roof line and a tunnel connecting it to the much larger Egyptian Building, now destroyed.

=== Carbon arc searchlight ===
For the 1904 St. Louis World's Fair, Lewis had the world's largest carbon arc searchlight installed atop the dome, 135 feet above street level. An eight-ton, 80-inch light built by General Electric in 1903, the University City searchlight developed at least 1 billion candlepower. The searchlight has a seven-foot carbon arc that is “ignited by carbon rods and reflected in a ground glass mirror that magnifies the light.”

The building elevator was too small to hold the light; its installation on the roof required a steam engine borrowed from the World's Fair. It sits on an elevator platform that raises the light through a hatch in the roof; today it is reached by a spiral staircase in the council chambers.

It was first illuminated on April 30, 1904, opening night of the World's Fair, to illuminate and advertise Lewis's tent city next to the Woman's Magazine Building.

After the Fair, the light sat unused until it was restored in 1930 for the dedication of the City Hall. It was used again for the dedication of the University City Public Library and then was neglected.

In 1964, it was "re-discovered" by City Engineer Robert Norvell, who found that it had been scavenged for parts, presumably during World War II. Norvell sought to restore it to working order, but found carbon rods difficult to come by and expensive, so the light was retrofitted with internals from a WWII searchlight. It was relit on May 10, 1965, by Mayor Nathan B. Kaufman. It has since been maintained and operated by his son, Bill Kaufman.

As of 2025, there is a new effort to refurbish the light and the elevator that raises it.
