= The Pageant =

Nightclub in St. Louis, Missouri, US

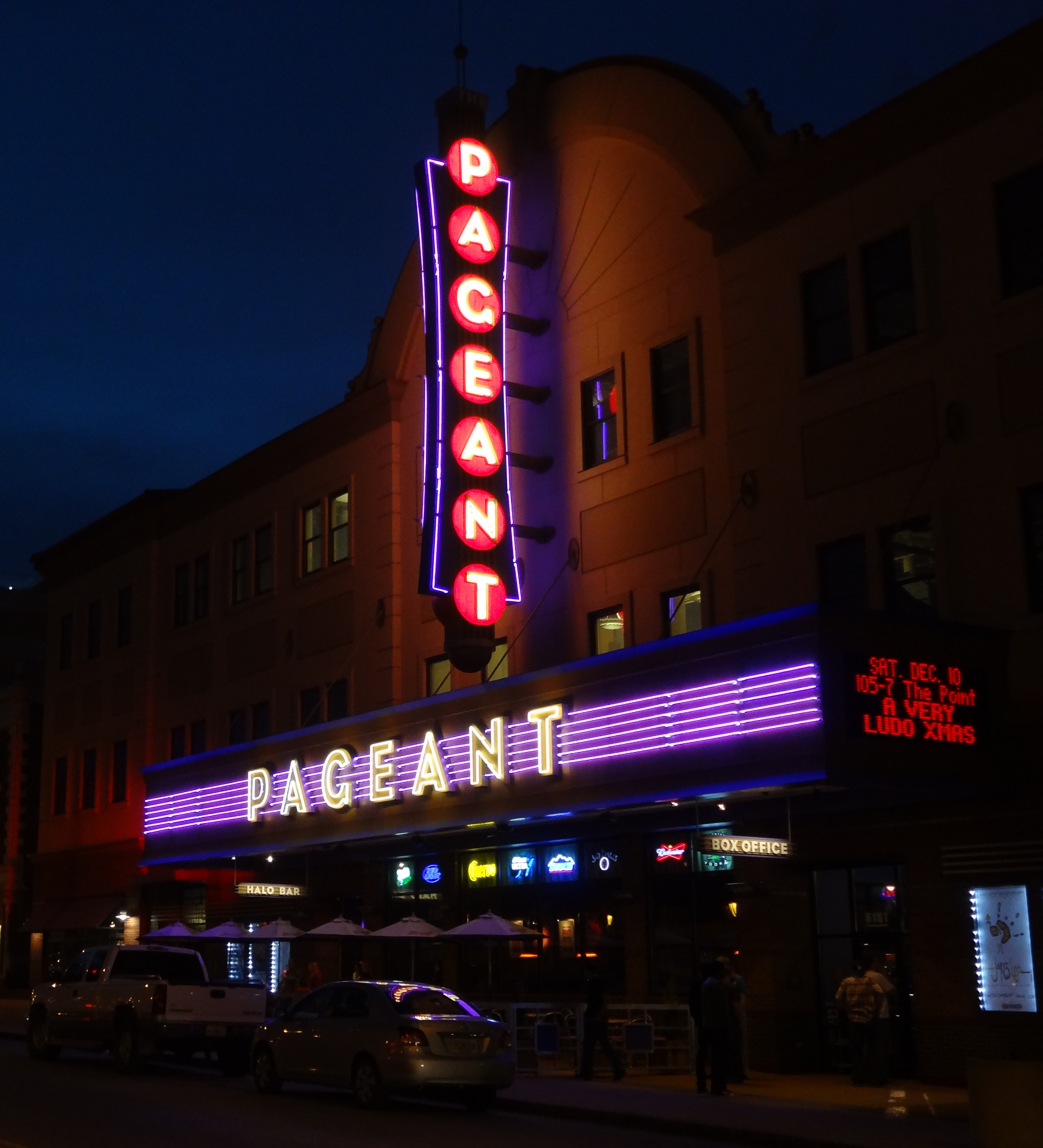
- Photographed in November 2011
- Interactive map of The Pageant
- Address: 6161 Delmar Blvd; St. Louis, Missouri; United States
- Owner: Live Nation
- Capacity: 2,300
- Type: Nightclub

Construction
- Opened: October 9, 2000

Website
- www.thepageant.com

The Pageant (also called The Pageant Concert Nightclub) is an American nightclub in St. Louis, Missouri.

Built as a nightclub, The Pageant opened its doors on October 19, 2000. It was named for a "long-gone Pageant movie theater" that once stood three blocks away. Located in St. Louis at 6161 Delmar Boulevard on the east end of the Delmar Loop, The Pageant has been described by the Riverfront Times as "St. Louis' premier midsize venue". Inside is a bar called The Halo Bar; as of December 2010, it was open every night regardless of whether there is a performance.

In Pollstar's ranking of the world's nightclubs by ticket sales, The Pageant ranked 4th in 2008 and 6th in 2014. In 2009, Alex Young wrote in Consequence of Sound that The Pageant put on great shows in a more intimate setting than other venues that had failed the test of time; he complimented the sound system, parking, and The Halo Bar.
