= Sporting District =

Sporting District was a term used in the 19th and early 20th centuries to refer to red-light districts, particularly in the United States. It may refer to:

- Sporting District (Omaha, Nebraska)
- San Antonio Sporting District, Texas
- Storyville, New Orleans
- Chestnut Valley, St. Louis
- Tenderloin, Manhattan
