= University City High School (Missouri) =

Secondary school in St. Louis County, Missouri, United States

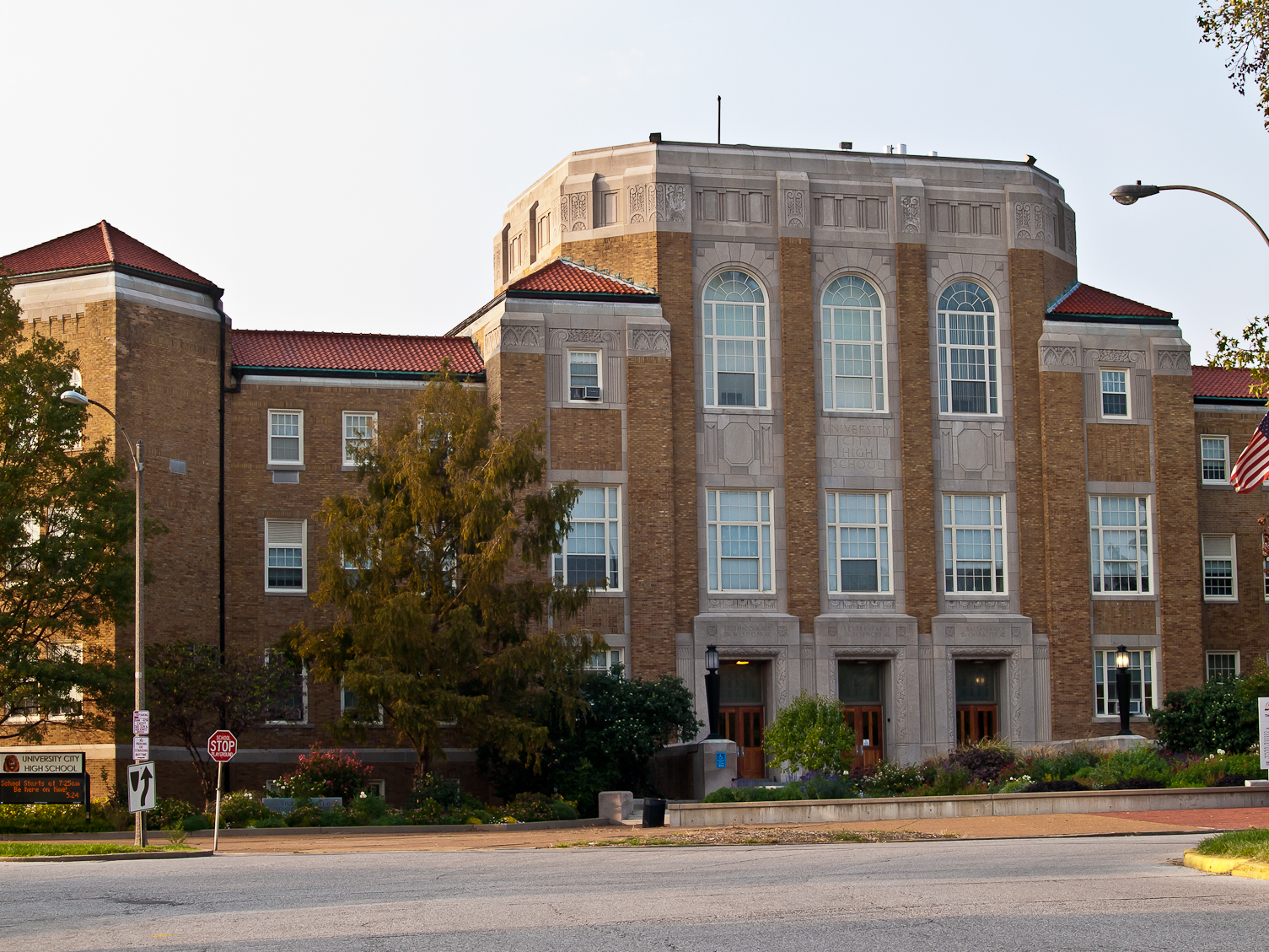

Location
- 7401 Balson Avenue; University City, MO 63130; United States; 38.6651°N 90.3293°W

Information
- Type: Comprehensive public high school
- Founded: 1930; 96 years ago
- Principal: Mike Peoples
- Staff: 61.87 (FTE)
- Grades: 9–12
- Enrollment: 811 (2023–24)
- Student to teacher ratio: 13.11
- Colors: Black and gold
- Athletics conference: Suburban Conference
- Nickname: Lions (formerly Indians)
- Website: ucityschools.org

University City High School (UCHS) is a public high school in University City, Missouri, United States, that is part of the School District of University City.

The district includes all of University City and small portions of Overland, Vinita Park and Wellston.

As part of the University City Education District, the high school building was listed, along with nearby Jackson Park Elementary School and Hanley Junior High School, in the National Register of Historic Places on January 31, 1985.

== Notable alumni ==
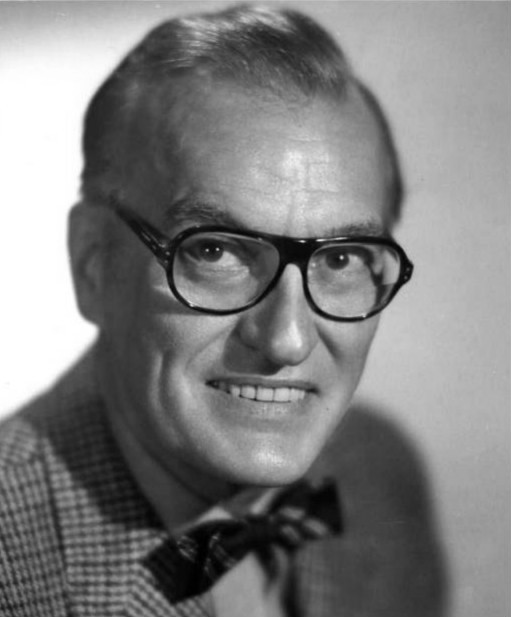
Dave Garroway

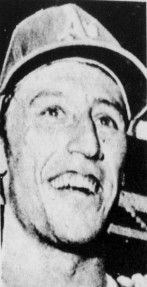
Ken Holtzman

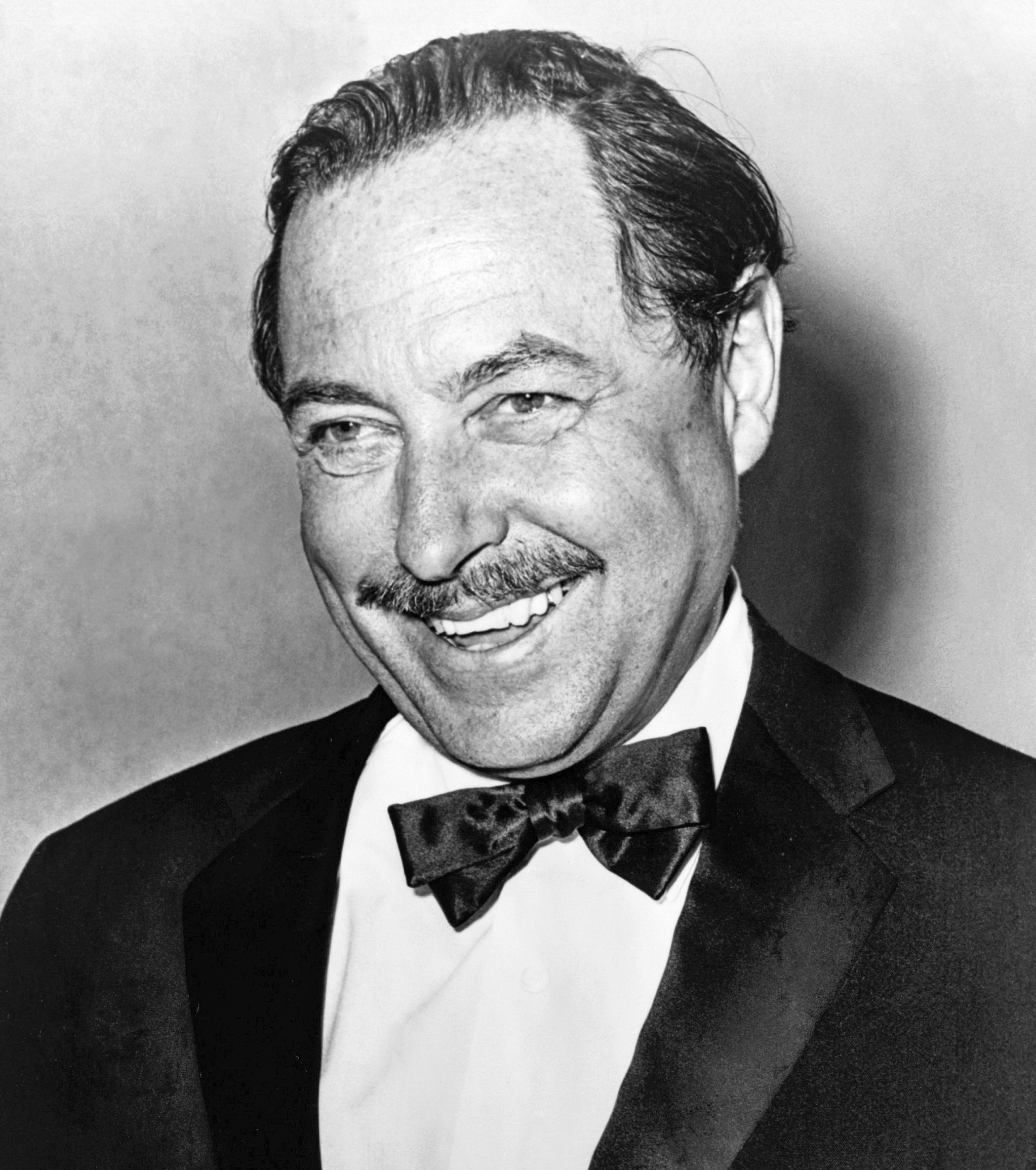
Tennessee Williams

- David Bass, NFL football player
- Bud Black, major-league pitcher
- Harold Brodkey, writer
- Jeremy Davenport, jazz musician
- Carl Dennis, Pulitzer Prize winning poet
- Bing Devine, former General Manager of the St. Louis Cardinals
- Marty Ehrlich, jazz musician
- Malcolm Frager, pianist
- Bob Gale, screenwriter, author, movie producer
- Dave Garroway, broadcaster
- Bernard Gilkey, major-league outfielder
- Marty Hendin, St. Louis Cardinals former director of public relations
- Ken Holtzman, two-time All Star major-league pitcher
- Art Jimmerson, professional boxer
- Billy Lawrence, singer
- Peter Martin, jazz pianist
- Ed Mickelson, major-league first baseman
- Samuel Moyn, historian
- Nelly, rapper
- Virginia E. Palmer, United States Ambassador to Ghana
- Leslie Parnas, cellist
- Robert Person, major-league pitcher
- Leonard Roberts, actor
- Art Shamsky, major-league outfielder and Israel Baseball League manager
- William Sleator, author
- Marlene Terry, politician
- Tershawn Wharton, NFL player
- Tennessee Williams, playwright
- Lew Wolff, co-owner of the Oakland Athletics

== See also ==
- National Register of Historic Places listings in St. Louis County, Missouri
