= List of Missouri Western Griffons in the NFL draft =

This is a list of Missouri Western Griffons football players in the NFL draft.

== Key ==
B	Back	K	Kicker	NT	Nose tackle
C	Center	LB	Linebacker	FB	Fullback
DB	Defensive back	P	Punter	HB	Halfback
DE	Defensive end	QB	Quarterback	WR	Wide receiver
DT	Defensive tackle	RB	Running back	G	Guard
E	End	T	Offensive tackle	TE	Tight end

= Pro Bowler
= Hall of Famer

== Selections ==
Year	Round	Pick	Player	Team	Position
1985	7	180	Vince Thomson	Kansas City Chiefs	DE
1996	6	170	John Fisher	Jacksonville Jaguars	DB
2012	6	171	Greg Zuerlein	St. Louis Rams	K
2013	18	211	David Bass	Oakland Raiders	DE
