= Leo Drey =

Leo Albert Drey Jr. ( /ˌdraɪ/, January 19, 1917 – May 26, 2015) was an American timber magnate, conservationist, and philanthropist from Missouri.

== Biography ==
Born in St. Louis, Missouri, to a wealthy manufacturer of glassware, Drey was a 1935 graduate of John Burroughs School and a 1939 graduate of Antioch College. In 1937, he was 20 and traveling with six other students in Shanghai when war broke out between China and Japan. Drey began acquiring timberland in the Missouri Ozarks for reforestation and conservation in 1951. His holdings, much acquired for the price of back taxes, eventually grew to nearly 160,000 acres (650 km^{2}), the largest private landholding in the state and larger than Missouri's entire state park system. The project, known as Pioneer Forest, is a commercial forest managed in the public interest, with single-tree selection harvesting techniques, which he pioneered. Drey purchased the Greer Mill property in 1987, and later sold it to the Forest Service for incorporation into the Eleven Point District of the Mark Twain National Forest.

From 1968 to 1990, Drey was a leading investor in The University City Home Rental Trust, an experiment in maintaining racial integration of a neighborhood, took place in University City, Missouri. The goal of UCHRT bought houses in a part of the city where whites were moving out and African Americans were moving in. The houses were rented to white families with school-age children. The goal. In 1979, the St. Louis Post-Dispatch said, "The project—which experts say may be the only one of its kind in the United States—appears to have promoted integration successfully."

Drey founded the L-A-D Foundation, which acquires and protects other natural areas in the state, leasing many of them to the state park system at $1 per year. In 2005 Drey was placed at No. 6 on Slate magazine's annual list of the top 60 U.S. philanthropists, thanks to his gift of 146,000 acres (590 km^{2}) of Ozark land, valued at $180 million, to the L-A-D Foundation. Other Drey beneficiaries have included his alma mater Antioch College; John Burroughs School, which uses Drey land for biology and outdoor education courses; the Government Accountability Project; and Missouri Coalition for the Environment, Missouri's first independent citizens' group to address a broad range of environmental issues. In 1991, he donated his papers to the Western Historical Manuscript Collection at the University of Missouri–St. Louis.

His downtown office answering machine message said, "I’m out planting a forest. Please leave your name and number and I’ll try to get back to you before it matures." In 1955, Drey married Kay Kranzberg, who became, like himself, an environmental and civic advocate for more than half a century. Together, they raised three children, two daughters, Laura and Eleanor, and a son, Leonard.

Drey died at his home in University City at age 98 on May 26, 2015, two weeks after suffering a stroke. His body was donated to the Washington University School of Medicine for science.
