= Ruth Park Golf Course =

Golf course in Missouri, U.S.

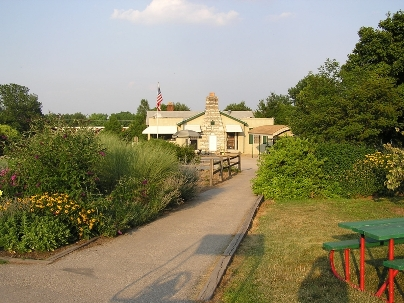
- Clubhouse

- Location within Missouri
- 38°40′06″N 90°20′54″W

Club information
- Location: University City, Missouri
- Established: 1931
- Type: Municipal
- Tota holes: 9
- Website: ruthparkgolf.org
- Designed by: Robert Foulis
- Par: 35
- Length: 3,023 yards (2,760 m)
- Course rating: 34.0
- Slope rating: 113

Ruth Park Golf Course is in the heart of University City, Missouri, United States. It is a 9-hole facility with driving range available for anyone to play year round. Residents of University City get a reduced rate if they present a University ID card produced at the Centennial Commons.

== Course History ==
Founded in 1931, the course was designed by Robert Foulis who was an assistant at St. Andrews in Scotland prior to coming over to the United States. Foulis also designed other local courses, including the original Forest Park Golf Course as well as Normandie Golf Club, which is the oldest public course west of the Mississippi River. Ruth Park had plans to become an 18 hole facility, but that never ended up materializing.

== Layout ==
Ruth Park Golf Course has a unique design that uses the slightly hilly terrain. The fairways are very wide throughout, but the greens are quite small. Several holes have out of bounds to the right off the tee. The course has undergone some work as of late to improve the fairways, and the transition to completely zoysia fairways, with bent grass greens. The second, sixth, and seventh hole are tree lined. There is a small practice putting green to go along with the driving range.

== Scorecard ==
Ruth Park Golf Course
Tee	Rating/Slope	1	2	3	4	5	6	7	8	9	Total
Par		4	4	5	3	4	4	4	3	4	35
Blue	M:34.0/113 W:37.1/125	374	336	499	155	411	414	341	144	349	3023
White	M:32.8/112 W:35.5/118	339	312	479	131	380	335	317	131	328	2752
Red	M:30.6/94 W:32.2/99	296	302	425	106	241	301	267	123	315	2376
SI		2	6	4	8	1	7	5	9	3
