= The Runaway Soul =

1991 novel by Harold Brodkey

First edition

The Runaway Soul, published by Farrar, Straus & Giroux in 1991, first edition ISBN 978-0-374-25286-1, Library of Congress catalog card number 91-75885, was the long-awaited first novel by Harold Brodkey. It represents either part or all of the work that Brodkey labored over for more than a quarter century. It had also originally been announced as A Party of Animals.

The plot of the novel concerns Brodkey's autobiographical character, Wiley Silenowicz, whose fate closely parallels the author's own childhood in St. Louis in the 1930s. Stylistically, the novel attempts to render sensation into language, following the style of Brodkey's celebrated New Yorker stories. In terms of material, much of The Runaway Soul was drawn from Brodkey's second collection of short stories, Stories in an Almost Classical Mode, which in turn was made of Brodkey's entire story output from 1963 to 1988.

The reviews of The Runaway Soul were mixed, and some quite negative. Time's review on publication was mediocre at best, ending with the observation, "[O]ne of the earliest [chapter headings] says volumes about the volume to follow. It is titled 'The Masturbation'." Newsweek's reviewer, while also giving it disingenuous praise, ended the review by stating, "The Runaway Soul is absolutely the last book you want to say this about, but it could have used a rewrite." In The New Criterion, Bruce Bawer called the book "one of the literary fiascos of all time." It did, however, receive a favorable review by D.M. Thomas.

== References in popular culture ==
- In Woody Allen's Husbands and Wives, a copy of the book can be seen on Gabe (Allen) and Judy's (Farrow) coffee table.
- On several episodes of Season 3 of Californication, the jacketless spine of the novel can be spotted on a book-cart in the university office of the show's Hank Moody.

== See also ==
- Stories in an Almost Classical Mode
- The World Is the Home of Love and Death
