= Missouri Coalition for the Environment =

American non-profit conservation organization

- Established: 1969
- President: Deidre Griffith
- Staff: Jared Opsal, Executive Director Melissa Vatterott, Policy Director; Carmen Harris, Development Director; Christen Commuso, Community Outreach Specialist - St. Louis; Jim Karpowicz, Community Outreach Specialist - Mid-Missouri; Makenna Nickens, Community Outreach Specialist - Kansas City Ollie Caron-Noble, Policy Specialist Elyse Schaeffer, Policy Coordinator
- Address: 725 Kingsland Avenue Suite 100
- Location: Headquarters in St. Louis, St. Louis, MO
- Website: http://moenvironment.org/

Missouri Coalition for the Environment, a non-profit, non-partisan, 501(c)(3) state-level conservation organization, campaigns for clean air, clean water and clean energy in Missouri. The organization is member and grant supported.

== History ==
Missouri Coalition for the Environment (MCE) was founded in 1969 out of a convention at the Missouri Botanical Garden. The group served as Missouri's first citizen-based action group. By 1971 MCE had become a more solid organization, with a permanent group of board members. The founders came from diverse backgrounds. Notable figures such as Lewis Green and Leo Drey had strong background knowledge of environmental issues and implemented practical resolutions.

"... since its founding by such distinguished luminaries as Leo A. Drey, R. Walston Chubb, Dr. Barry Commoner, Lewis C. Green and Emily Ullman, . . .the Coalition has been an ever present champion for the development of rational and effective environmental programs."
Buzz Westfall, St. Louis County Executive, October 1994

=== The 1970s ===
Shortly after the organization began, they took on Union Electric and their plans to build a nuclear power plant in Callaway County, MO. The Callaway Nuclear Generating Station was to become Missouri's first nuclear plant. MCE opposed the idea of nuclear power but construction of the plant could not be stopped. In 1976, MCE launched a campaign to prohibit a Union Electric rate increases that would force customers to pay for construction work in progress (CWIP). Due to MCE's efforts, an anti-CWIP law was passed with a 2 to 1 vote, but MCE's fight against the plant was not over. In 1980, MCE testified during Public Service Commission hearings on a plan to build a second reactor. Two weeks following the trial the plans were canceled.

In 1978 MCE began to get involved with Forest Park. Plans were announced to relocate the St. Louis Science Center to park's south side. MCE opposed. Although the Science Center was eventually built, MCE was influential in the planning process. During this same period plans were made to expand parking for the old Arena into the park during the 1970s, MCE opposed them. The campaign was a success and no green space was lost to the Arena, which was demolished about 20 years later.

The Earth City floodplain on the Missouri River in west St. Louis County was another major issue for Missouri Coalition for the Environment during the 1970s. In 1971, MCE filed a lawsuit against floodplain development, winning a seminal ruling prohibiting development below the high-water mark without a federal permit. The lawsuit also resulted in a decree preserving the land between the Earth City levee and the Missouri River as open space. The case was used a precedent in many other decisions involving the Corps of Engineers and development in flood plains since the court decision forced the Corp to extend their jurisdiction.

=== the 1980s ===
During the 1980s floodplains were threatened again when plans to build a large sports stadium on the Maryland Heights floodplain surfaced. The large dome would have housed a majority of St. Louis's sporting events, causing not only harm to the floodplain itself but also producing a large amount of commuter pollution and moving attractions from downtown. MCE was able to prevent construction and pave the way for a new stadium in the city with a much smaller environmental impact. In 1997, MCE launched a campaign to keep the Horseshoe Casino out of the area. Eventually, a federal court order was won, prohibiting the Nevada casino from docking a gambling boat at Earth City.

=== The 1990s ===
During the early 1990s MCE's focus shifted back to Forest Park. In 1992, MCE led a campaign against Proposition 1 which would have allowed for the expansion of Art Museum parking. The proposition failed and over 22 acres (89,000 m^{2}) of the Forest Park were saved. During the late 1990s the Coalition closely followed the development of the Forest Park's Master Plan and objected to all instances which would cause environmental harm. Campaigns were launched to support ideas such as a free flowing river, restoration of wetlands and prairies, protection of native plant and animal species and the introduction of a savannah in Kennedy forest. These ideas, incorporated into the final, have now become reality.

=== 2000–present ===
When high levels of dangerous lead contamination were recognized in the town of Herculaneum, Missouri in 2001, residents contacted the MCE, who began to monitor the situation in addition to smelter emissions. It was discovered that trucks carrying lead concentrate to the smelter were responsible for spreading the contaminants. The EPA then began to enforce the national lead air standard, which forced Doe Run, the smelter's owner, to clean up the area and buy out the homes nearest the plant. In 2005, the Coalition won a 2004 lawsuit on behalf of two Herculaneum residents prompted by the EPA's failure to review lead air pollution standards every five years as required by the Clean Air Act. The courts then ordered the EPA to conduct a decades-overdue review. The Coalition mobilized the children's health community to ensure that the new standard was protective in order to counter industry lobbyists who pushed the EPA to remove the standard all together. During the review process, Kat Logan Smith, executive director of MCE, and Leslie Warden, a former Herculaneum resident, testified at the EPA's clean air scientific advisory panel in North Carolina. The review resulted in a new standard that is ten times more protective than the one it replaced. It will go into effect between 2010 and 2013 and be emulated around the globe.

In 2004, the Coalition reached a landmark settlement with the EPA that required a major overhaul of the state's water quality standards, including new recreational-use protections for 25,000 miles (40,000 km) of streams and improved protections for the Current River, Jacks Fork and Eleven Point River. Prior to the settlement, more than 90% of the state's surface waters were not required to be clean enough for safe recreational use. MCE continues to press for strong water quality standards and Clean Water Act protections for the remaining 158,000 miles (254,000 km) of small streams that the state currently deems "unclassified".

MCE belongs to the Mississippi River Collaborative (), a coalition of organizations working together to reduce pollution into the Mississippi River and its tributaries and to reduce the Dead Zone in the Gulf of Mexico.

In 2008, MCE defended consumers from another proposed CWIP rate hike in a follow-up attempt by Ameren UE to building a second reactor at the Callaway Nuclear Generating Station in Callaway County, Missouri. MCE started a new program called Renew Missouri to promote clean, renewable energy. Renew Missouri and the MCE led a successful campaign educating voters on the costs and employment impacts of Proposition C, the Clean Energy Initiative. On November 4, 2008, Missouri voters approved the measure that requires investor-owned utilities to obtain at least 15% of their power from renewable sources by 2021. Currently, MCE is working to educate the public through events like the Green Homes Festival and statewide clean energy forums in which community members and public officials have a chance to learn about clean energy solutions.

== Timeline ==
1969
The Coalition for the Environment was founded out of the St. Louis Conference on the Environment held at the Missouri Botanical Garden on June 5.
1971
The Coalition filed a landmark lawsuit against major floodplain development, winning a seminal ruling prohibiting development below the high-water mark without a federal permit and a decree preserving the land between the Earth City levee and the Missouri River as open space.

1976
The Coalition led a successful statewide campaign to prevent utility companies from charging ratepayers for construction work in progress (CWIP) with a 2 to 1 vote.

1980
The Coalition intervened in Public Service Commission hearings on Union Electric's plans to build two nuclear power reactors in Callaway County. After two weeks of hearings, the second reactor was canceled, saving ratepayers millions of dollars and reducing the generation of dangerous radioactive wastes.

1984
The Coalition helped draft the Missouri State Superfund Law and assisted in its passage with the aid of its full-time lobbyist in Jefferson City.

1987
The Coalition's federal lawsuit blocked St. Louis County's effort to build a 70,000-seat sports stadium in the floodplain in Maryland Heights, paving the way for a stadium to be built downtown to augment Convention Center facilities.

1992
Working in concert with Citizens to Protect Forest Park, the Coalition enabled St. Louis voters to reject Art Museum plans to expand the building and construct parking lots in Forest Park.

1993
After several years of effort, the Coalition, led by Leo Drey, helped to ensure that Greer Spring will be protected from development by assisting in the passage of a federal law adding this second largest Missouri spring to the Eleven Point Wild and Scenic River system and transferring the surrounding 7,000 acres (28 km^{2}) to the federal government to be maintained in its natural state.

1997
Missouri Coalition for the Environment won a lawsuit in the Missouri Supreme Court which returns the executive branch of the state government the right to determine how legislation is enforced. The coalition also won a federal court order prohibiting a Nevada casino from harboring a gambling boat at Earth City and transporting 15,000 gamblers each day across the protected open space between the levee and the Missouri River.

1998
The Coalition joined with the Sierra Club in a lawsuit against the Environmental Protection Agency for failing to enforce clean air regulations in the St. Louis area; St. Louis had failed to meet the federal standards for ozone or smog since 1978. This fight continued for four years until a decision is finally reached that the EPA must bring St. Louis up to standards.

2004
The Coalition reached a settlement with the EPA that required a major overhaul of the state's water quality standards, including new recreational-use protections for 25,000 miles (40,000 km) of streams and improved protections for the Current, Jacks Fork and Eleven Point rivers. Prior to the settlement more than 90% of the state's surface waters were not required to be clean enough for safe recreational use.

2005
The Coalition won a 2004 lawsuit on behalf of two Herculaneum residents prompted by the EPA's failure to review lead air pollution standards every five years as required by the Clean Air Act. The courts then ordered the EPA to conduct a decades-overdue review. The Coalition mobilized the children's health community to ensure that the new standard was protective and to counter industry lobbying. The review resulted in a new standard that is ten times more protective than the one it replaced. It will go into effect between 2010 and 2013 and be emulated around the globe.

2008
The Coalition led a successful campaign educating voters on the costs and employment impacts of Proposition C, the Clean Energy Initiative. On November 4, Missouri voters approved the measure that requires investor-owned utilities to obtain at least 15% of their power from renewable sources by 2021.

== Recent Accomplishments ==
The Coalition educated Missourians on the costs and employment impacts of Prop C, the Clean Energy Initiative. On November 4, 2008, a majority of Missouri voters approved the measure that requires utilities to obtain 15% of their power from renewable sources by 2021.

On October 15, 2008, in the culmination of a Coalition lawsuit, the U.S. Environmental Protection Agency established a new standard for the amount of the toxic metal lead allowed in air. The new standard is ten times more protective of public health than the one it replaces.

On August 31, in response to the Coalition's legal work on the Clean Water Act, the Missouri Dept. of Natural Resources began to implement a long-neglected but critical provision in the Clean Water Act known as "anti-degradation" that will help keep clean streams clean.

== Current projects ==
=== Water Quality ===
- Investigate and challenge Missouri's use of sewage lagoon limits that allow excessive pollution of the state's waters.
- Investigate permitted wetland projects in which there have been identified significant violations and initiate plans to force corrections.
- Watchdog implementation of the water quality standards lawsuit settlement to ensure that the state fulfills its obligations.
- Participate in the development and application of criteria for nitrogen and phosphorus pollution to protect lakes and streams in Missouri.
- Document and challenge inadequacies in the state's rules for factory farms, also known as concentrated animal feeding operations, and advocate for effective rules to protect Missouri's air, land, and water.
- Educate Missourians on the potential impact of Farm Bill programs on reducing agricultural pollution in the Mississippi River basin.
- Build support for improved water quality standards for all Missouri waters.

=== Energy + Air ===
- Educate Missourians about renewable energy and energy conservation.
- Promote energy policies that reduce Missouri's dependence on coal and nuclear power and that foster development of clean, renewable energy.
- Monitor the implementation of the court-ordered federal review of the air standard for the toxic metal lead and advocate for standards that sufficiently protect public health and environment.
- Press for enforcement of air quality standards at the Doe Run lead smelter in Herculaneum.

=== Forests + Scenic Rivers + Public Lands ===
- Mobilize participation in the Ozark National Scenic Riverways Management Plan Process through Friends of Ozark Riverways.
- Promote the Missouri Wilderness Coalition proposal for designating an additional 3% of the Mark Twain National Forest as "wilderness".
