= Greer Mill =

- U.S. National Register of Historic Places
- Location within Missouri Location within the United States
- Location: Western side of Route 10, 10 miles (16 km) north of Alton, near Alton, Missouri
- Coordinates: 36°47′11″N 91°20′33″W
- Area: less than one acre
- Built: 1899
- Built by: Greer, Samuel; Mainprize, George
- Architectural style: Late 19th Century Mill
- NRHP reference No.: 05001551
- Added to NRHP: January 26, 2006

Greer Mill, also known as Greer Roller Mill, is a historic grist mill located near Alton, Oregon County, Missouri. It was built in 1899, and is a 2 1/2-story, rectangular, frame mill building on a sandstone foundation. It has a side gable roof topped by a cupola. The mill operated until 1920. Conservationist Leo Drey purchased the property in 1987, and later sold it to the Forest Service for incorporation into the Eleven Point District of the Mark Twain National Forest.

It was listed on the National Register of Historic Places in 2005.
