= The University City Home Rental Trust =

The University City Home Rental Trust (UCHRT), an experiment in maintaining racial integration of a neighborhood, took place in University City, Missouri, from 1968 to 1990.

UCHRT bought houses in a part of the city where whites were moving out and African Americans were moving in. The houses were rented to white families with school-age children. The goal was to keep the neighborhood and the local public school integrated. In 1979, the St. Louis Post-Dispatch said, "The project—which experts say may be the only one of its kind in the United States—appears to have promoted integration successfully."

== Background ==
University City, an old inner suburb of St. Louis, had an almost entirely white population until 1960. In the early '60s, increasing numbers of blacks moved in. Elected officials and community leaders decided to make integration of the city their goal, said then-City Manager Charles Henry. They felt that they were making an effort that was long overdue. UCHRT spokeswomn Kay Drey wrote that in America up to that time, once blacks started to move into a community, it would remain integrated only for as long as it took for all the whites to move out.

== The Trust ==
The idea for the trust came from Rev. William G. Lorenz of the University City Human Relations Commission. He said that in the area around Pershing Elementary School, white homeowners had reached a stage of "incipient run-away panic." and that something unusual would need to be done to draw whites to the area and keep the school integrated. He believed that young, well-educated, growing, "highly-mobile" families were seeking to rent quality houses and that the marketplace was not meeting this demand. He further asserted that many of these people were enlightened enough in racial attitudes to move into a mixed neighborhood, provided they were renting and not buying. Drey said that renters did not need to fear declining resale value, a key driver of white flight by homeowners.

In March 1968, the Trust was formed by Kay Drey and her husband Leo Drey, Janet Becker, Alan Kohn, and other investors. By August, it had bought and renovated nine houses in northeastern University City. By September 1969, it owned 20 houses, all rented. But the trust experienced problems. It operated at a loss for its first year. Attracting more investors was difficult "because of our controversial nature." The Executive Committee sought to make it clear that they were not trying to keep African Americans out. Kohn said that he spoke to a neighborhood meeting of 50 people, about half of whom were black, and that they were "relieved and enthusiastic about what we were doing."

To fulfill its purpose, the UCHRT needed white families with children of age to attend the public schools in its houses. Recruiting suitable tenants was its most persistent problem. When working with a commercial real estate firm, the UCHRT found that it tended to send them African American clients. It was necessary to use the University City Residential Service, a non-profit office co-founded by the Dreys, to find white applicants. But one white couple threatened to sue, charging that the UCHRT discriminated against families without school-age children. In 1973, Drey wrote that it was "increasingly hard" to find suitable families and described the trust as "faltering." Still, by 1977, all the houses were rented.

Lorenz was proven correct about the sort of people who would be willing to rent from the UCHRT. In 1970, nine of 22 tenants were junior faculty or other employees of nearby Washington University in St. Louis. Five more worked at other universities. In interviews, many tenants said they were satisfied with the neighborhood and school and felt they were doing something good for the city.

In 1979, the UCHRT owned 35 houses, which would turn out to be its apogee. The St. Louis Post-Dispatch took notice of its activities. Reporter Freivogel said that the UCRS did not tell blacks about UCHRT houses, instead steering them to white neighborhoods, which might be a violation of the Fair Housing Act. Some activists denounced the UCHRT's investors as over-reaching, arrogant whites. But after interviewing residents of the Pershing neighborhood, Freivogel reported some praise and no complaints from black residents about the trust's role in keeping the area integrated.

In a later analytical piece, Freivogel applied the then-current term "integration maintenance" to the UCHRT's activities. Integration maintenance was "pioneered in University City and suburbs of Chicago" and had spread to other large metropolitan areas, but it remained controversial.

== Dissolution ==
In the mid-1980s, the UCHRT began to wind down. Its investors felt that it had served its purpose. By 1984, the Trust had sold nine of its houses. They had been bought for $11,000 to $20,000 in the late 1960s and were now worth $30,000 to $40,000. In 1985, Drey called the trust "an extremely successful venture," adding that the area of northeast University City "remains at least somewhat racially integrated now." She said that the trust had sold 23 of its houses, "most to our tenants." Investors in the trust recouped 130% of their investment. By August 1990, all the houses were sold and the Trust closed.
