= David Bass (American football) =

American football player (born 1990)

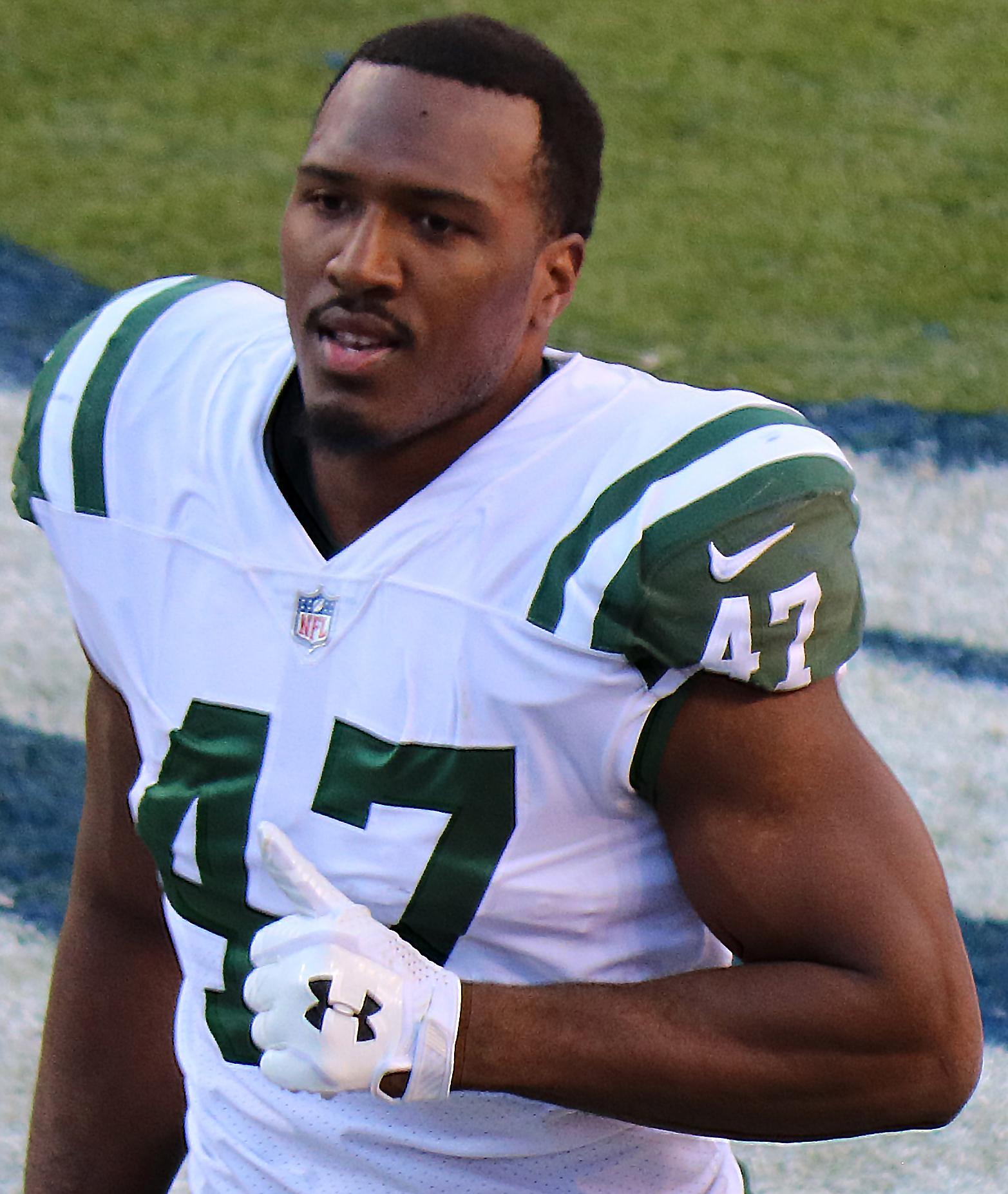
- Bass with the New York Jets in 2017

No. 91, 51, 47
- Position: Linebacker

Personal information
- Born: September 11, 1990 (age 36); St. Louis, Missouri, U.S.
- Listed height: 6 ft 4 in (1.93 m)
- Listed weight: 256 lb (116 kg)

Career information
- High school: University City (University City, Missouri)
- College: Missouri Western State
- NFL draft: 2013: 7th round, 233rd overall pick

Career history
- Oakland Raiders (2013)*; Chicago Bears (2013–2014); Tennessee Titans (2015–2016); Seattle Seahawks (2017); New York Jets (2017)
- * Offseason or practice squad member only

Awards and highlights
- 2× First−team All-MIAA (2011, 2012)

Career NFL statistics
- Total tackles: 111
- Sacks: 9
- Forced fumbles: 1
- Fumble recoveries: 2
- Interceptions: 2
- Defensive touchdowns: 1
- Stats at Pro Football Reference

David Vincent Bass Jr. (born September 11, 1990) is an American former professional football player who was a linebacker for five seasons in the National Football League (NFL). He was selected by the Oakland Raiders in the seventh round of the 2013 NFL draft. He was also a member of the Chicago Bears, Tennessee Titans, Seattle Seahawks, and New York Jets. He played college football for the Missouri Western Griffons.

== Early life ==
Bass was a team captain for University City High School in St. Louis, and became an all-metro selection; Bass also was awarded the Fab-25 Demetrius Johnson Award, given to the top defensive linemen in Missouri and Illinois.

== College career ==
Bass attended Missouri Western State, breaking the school record with 40.5 career sacks and 50 consecutive starts. In his senior year, Bass was a finalist for the Gene Upshaw Award and played in the East-West Shrine Game.

== Professional career ==
Pre-draft measurables
Height	Weight	Arm length	Hand span	40-yard dash	10-yard split	20-yard split	20-yard shuttle	Three-cone drill	Vertical jump	Broad jump	Bench press
6 ft 3 7/8 in (1.93 m)	262 lb (119 kg)	33 1/2 in (0.85 m)	10 1/2 in (0.27 m)	4.74 s	1.67 s	2.71 s	4.33 s	7.07 s	30.5 in (0.77 m)	9 ft 3 in (2.82 m)	20 reps
All values from NFL Combine

=== Oakland Raiders ===
Bass was selected by the Oakland Raiders in the seventh round (233rd overall) of the 2013 NFL draft. On August 31, 2013, he was waived by the Raiders.

=== Chicago Bears ===
On September 1, Bass was claimed off waivers by the Chicago Bears. Bass made his first NFL start against the Detroit Lions in Week 10. The following week against the Baltimore Ravens, Bass intercepted Joe Flacco and returned the pick 24 yards for a touchdown, becoming the first Bears lineman to record a pick-six since Michael Haynes in 2004 against the Tennessee Titans, and the first Bears rookie defensive lineman to do so since Jon Norris in 1987 against the New Orleans Saints. On September 5, 2015, he was released by the Bears.

=== Tennessee Titans ===
On September 6, 2015, Bass was claimed off waivers by the Tennessee Titans. He was not re-signed following the 2016 season. Bass played in 29 games, starting seven, over his two seasons with the Titans. He had 52 tackles, 1.5 sacks, two fumble recoveries, and one interception with the team.

=== Seattle Seahawks ===
On May 9, 2017, Bass signed with the Seattle Seahawks. He was released on September 19, 2017. He had appeared in 2 games with one tackle.

=== New York Jets ===
On September 21, 2017, Bass signed with the New York Jets. Bass played in 13 games, starting three, logging 25 tackles and 3.5 sacks.

On April 30, 2018, Bass re-signed with the Jets. He was released on August 31, 2018.

== NFL career statistics ==
Legend
**Bold**	Career high

Year	Team	Games		Tackles					Interceptions					Fumbles			
Year	Team	GP	GS	Cmb	Solo	Ast	Sck	TFL	Int	Yds	TD	Lng	PD	FF	FR	Yds	TD
2013	CHI	12	1	23	15	8	1.0	**4**	**1**	**24**	**1**	**24**	1	0	0	0	0
2014	CHI	8	1	10	6	4	3.0	2	0	0	0	0	0	**1**	0	0	0
2015	TEN	**16**	**7**	**36**	**23**	**13**	1.5	**4**	**1**	8	0	8	**4**	0	**2**	0	0
2016	TEN	13	0	16	10	6	0.0	0	0	0	0	0	0	0	0	0	0
2017	SEA	2	0	1	0	1	0.0	0	0	0	0	0	0	0	0	0	0
2017	NYJ	13	2	25	16	9	**3.5**	**4**	0	0	0	0	0	0	0	0	0
Career		64	11	111	70	41	9.0	14	2	32	1	24	5	1	2	0	0

== Personal life ==
Bass became a franchise owner of The Exercise Coach in 2020 shortly after retiring from professional football.
