= School District of University City =

School district in Missouri, United States

Address
- 8136 Groby Road University City, Missouri, 63130; United States

District information
- Type: Public
- Grades: PreK–12
- NCES District ID: 2930660

Students and staff
- Students: 2,553
- Teachers: 212.16
- Staff: 89.5
- Student–teacher ratio: 12.03

Other information
- Website: www.ucityschools.org

The School District of University City is a school district headquartered in University City, Missouri in Greater St. Louis. The school district is overseen by Superintendent Dr. Sharonica Hardin-Bartley.

The district includes all of University City and small portions of Overland, Vinita Park and Wellston.

== Administration ==
=== Superintendent ===
The Superintendent of the School District of University City is Sharonica Hardin-Bartley. Prior to her appointment as superintendent in July 2016, she was the assistant superintendent for human resources and leadership development for the Ritenour School District, as well as the chief human resources officer for St. Louis Public Schools.

=== Board of education ===
There are 7 members of the Board of Education and one student representative:

- Matt Bellows, President
- Lisa Brenner, Vice President
- Laverne Ford-Williams, Secretary
- George Lenard
- Traci Moore
- Joanne Soudah
- Monica Stewart
- Michael Simmons, Student Representative

== Schools ==
There are 7 schools that are a part of the School District of University City.

=== Elementary Schools ===
- Julia Goldstein Early Childhood Education Center (Pre-K)
- Barbara C. Jordan Elementary School (K-5)
- Flynn Park Elementary School (K-5)
- Jackson Park Elementary School (K-5)
- Pershing Elementary School (K-5)

=== Secondary Schools ===
- Brittany Woods Middle School (6-8)
- University City High School

Students with disabilities are referred to the Special School District of St. Louis County (SSD) facilities. University City School District residents are zoned to Litzsinger School (Aged 5–13) in Ladue and Neuwoehner High School (Aged 14–21) in Town and Country.
