= This Wild Darkness: The Story of My Death =

Compilation of essays by Harold Brodkey

- Author: Harold Brodkey
- Genre: Autobiography
- Publisher: H. Holt
- Publication date: 1996
- ISBN: 9780805048315

This Wild Darkness is a compilation of essays written by Harold Brodkey as he neared death from AIDS and first published in 1996. The memoirs were written from when he was first diagnosed with AIDS until it left him too feeble to write, as he details in the later entries. Many were first printed in The New Yorker, where Brodkey's works most often appeared. They are written reflectively, regarding both recent events caused by his affliction (including the consideration of when to reveal his illness to friends and family, his activities such as a final trip to Venice, the treatment and care he receives for AIDS, and the current state of his health) and past memories revived by his condition (including his abusive stepfather, friends and relatives who had been in similar situations, a homosexual experience, and, as is described in most of his works, a childhood in St. Louis, Missouri). Brodkey died on January 26, 1996, at the age of 65.

The book was adapted into a performance piece by Italian playwright Pippo Delbono. Entitled Questo buio feroce, it debuted in Rome on October 3, 2006.

== Essay dates ==
- Spring, 1993
- Summer, 1993
- Late Winter, 1994
- Spring, 1994
- Summer, 1994
- Early Fall, 1995
- Late Fall, 1995

== See also ==
- The Mad Man
