= Ellen Schwamm =

American novelist

Ellen Schwamm Brodkey (born Ellen Rosenberg) 1934) is an American novelist. She graduated from Connecticut College in 1955 and soon after married her first husband, Jay Marc Schwamm a Princeton and Harvard graduate. She is the author of Adjacent Lives (1979), and How He Saved Her (1985). Her second marriage was to the American writer Harold Brodkey.
