= Stories in an Almost Classical Mode =

First edition

Stories in an Almost Classical Mode is a short story collection by the American writer Harold Brodkey, published in 1988 by Alfred A. Knopf. Most of the stories were published in The New Yorker, between 1963 and 1988. It was Brodkey's first book in 30 years, and presaged his much-heralded but ultimately disappointing first novel The Runaway Soul. In fact, much of the material that would make up The Runaway Soul appeared in short story form in Stories in an Almost Classical Mode.

Literary critic Harold Bloom includes Stories in an Almost Classical Mode in his book The Western Canon.

== Stories ==
- "The Abundant Dreamer"
- "On the Waves"
- "Bookkeeping"
- "Hofstedt and Jean—and Others"
- "The Shooting Range"
- "Innocence"
- "Play"
- "A Story in an Almost Classical Mode"
- "His Son, in His Arms, in Light, Aloft"
- "Puberty"
- "The Pain Continuum"
- "Largely an Oral History of My Mother"
- "Verona: A Young Woman Speaks"
- "Ceil"
- "S.L."
- "The Nurse's Music"
- "The Boys on Their Bikes"
- "Angel"

== References to Stories in an Almost Classical Mode in popular culture ==
- In Tamara Jenkins's Private Life, the character of Sadie is taught the story "Innocence" in a short-fiction college course; she writes a response piece titled "Experience."
