= First Love and Other Sorrows =

1958 short story collection by Harold Brodkey

- First edition cover (publ. Dial Press)
- Author: Harold Brodkey
- Genre: Short story collection
- Publisher: Dial Press

First Love and Other Sorrows is a collection of short stories by Harold Brodkey, first published in 1958. Eight of its nine stories were originally printed in The New Yorker and the other, "Trio for Three Gentle Voices", in Mademoiselle. The compilation was the first book Brodkey published.

== Stories ==
- "The State of Grace"
- "First Love and Other Sorrows"
- "The Quarrel"
- "Sentimental Education"
- "Laurie Dressing"
- "Laura"
- "Trio for Three Gentle Voices"
- "Piping Down the Valleys Wild"
- "The Dark Woman of the Sonnets"
