= Tershawn Wharton =

American football player (born 1998)

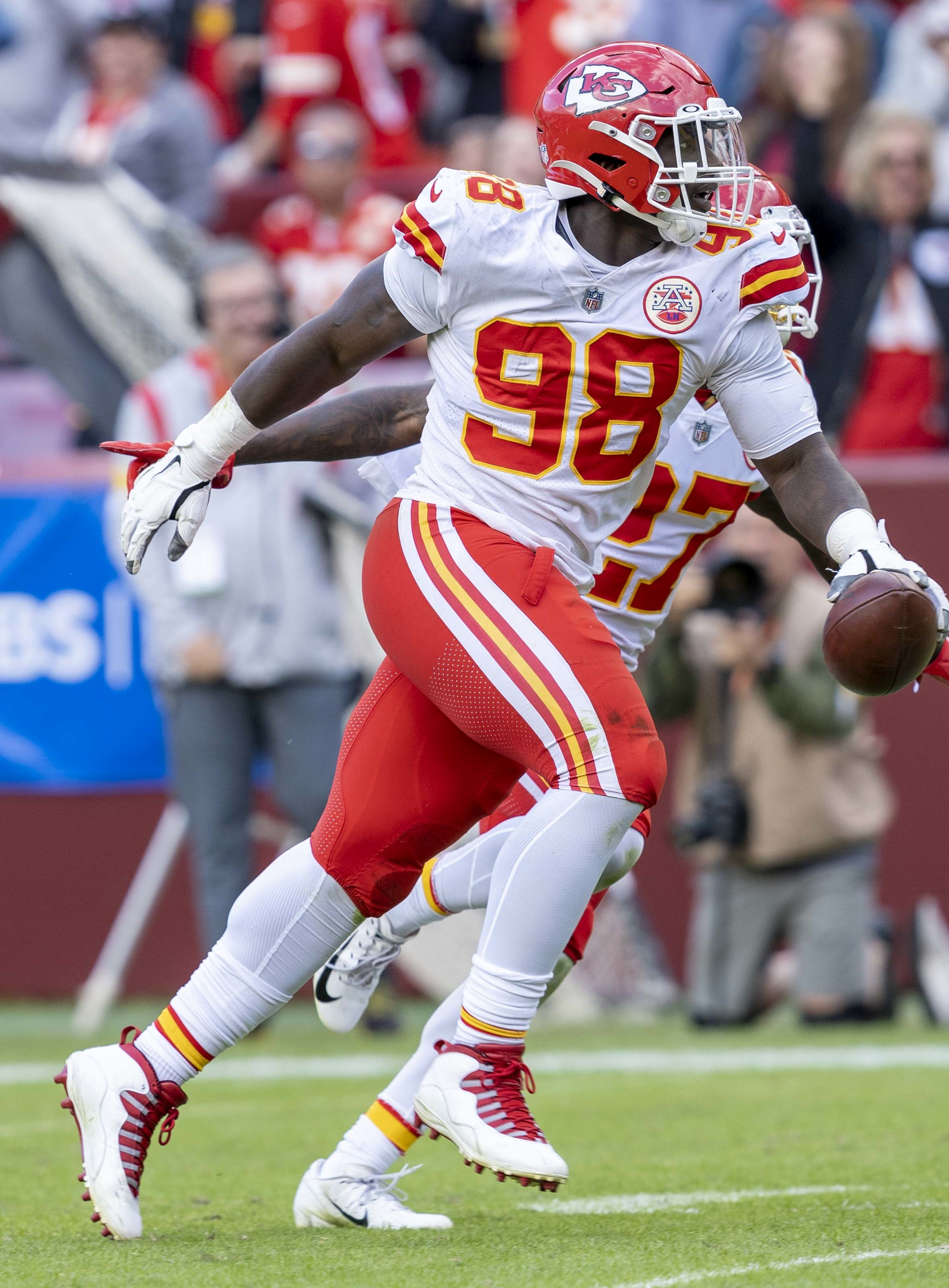
- Wharton with the Kansas City Chiefs in 2021

No. 98 – Carolina Panthers
- Position: Defensive end
- Roster status: Active

Personal information
- Born: June 25, 1998 (age 28); St. Louis, Missouri, U.S.
- Listed height: 6 ft 1 in (1.85 m)
- Listed weight: 295 lb (134 kg)

Career information
- High school: University City (University City, Missouri)
- College: Missouri S&T (2016–2019)
- NFL draft: 2020: undrafted

Career history
- Kansas City Chiefs (2020–2024); Carolina Panthers (2025–present)

Awards and highlights
- 2× Super Bowl champion (LVII, LVIII); 3× First-team All-GLVC (2017–2019)

Career NFL statistics as of 2025
- Total tackles: 150
- Sacks: 15.5
- Forced fumbles: 4
- Fumble recoveries: 2
- Pass deflections: 4
- Interceptions: 1
- Stats at Pro Football Reference

Tershawn "Turk" Wharton (born June 25, 1998) is an American professional football defensive end for the Carolina Panthers of the National Football League (NFL). He played college football for the Missouri S&T Miners.

== Early life ==
Wharton grew up in University City, Missouri, and attended Maplewood Richmond Heights High School for his first three seasons before transferring to University City High School. As a senior, he recorded 110 tackles with four sacks and an interception and was named first-team All-Suburban Central Conference.

== College career ==
Wharton was a four-year starter for the Missouri S&T Miners. He was named first-team All-Great Lakes Valley Conference (GLVC) after recording 64 tackles and 13.5 sacks in his sophomore season. He had 7.5 sacks both as a junior and senior and was named first-team All-GLVC in each season. Wharton finished his collegiate career with 58 tackles for loss and 35.5 sacks.

== Professional career ==
Pre-draft measurables
Height	Weight	Arm length	Hand span	Wingspan
6 ft 1 in (1.85 m)	280 lb (127 kg)	31 1/4 in (0.79 m)	10 1/4 in (0.26 m)	6 ft 4 1/4 in (1.94 m)
All values from Pro Day

=== Kansas City Chiefs ===
Wharton was signed by the Kansas City Chiefs as an undrafted free agent on April 27, 2020. He made the Chiefs' final roster out of training camp. Wharton made his NFL debut in the season opener on September 10, against the Houston Texans, making two tackles in a 34–20 win. In Week 8 against the New York Jets, Wharton recorded his first pro sack during the 35–9 win. Wharton finished his regular season with 27 tackles, four tackles for loss, and two sacks with a forced fumble and a fumble recovery in the regular season. Wharton recorded two tackles following the loss in Super Bowl LV.

In the Chiefs' week-5 game of the 2022 season, Wharton tore his ACL. He was placed on injured reserve on October 15, 2022. Without Wharton, the Chiefs defeated the Philadelphia Eagles in Super Bowl LVII.

In 2023, Wharton recorded 21 tackles, two sacks, and one fumble recovery. Wharton recorded one tackle in Super Bowl LVIII, where they defeated the San Francisco 49ers, 25-22.

On March 14, 2024, the Chiefs re-signed Wharton to a one-year, $2.742 million extension.

=== Carolina Panthers ===
On March 10, 2025, Wharton signed a three-year, $54 million contract with the Carolina Panthers. He started all nine of his appearances for Carolina during the regular season, recording one pass deflection, two sacks, and 36 combined tackles.

On May 16, 2026, it was reported that Wharton would be out indefinitely after undergoing neck surgery. After being the season on the PUP list, he was activated on October 17 for Week 6.

== NFL career statistics ==
Legend
	Won the Super Bowl
**Bold**	Career high

=== Regular season ===
Year	Team	Games		Tackles						Interceptions						Fumbles				
Year	Team	GP	GS	Cmb	Solo	Ast	Sck	TFL	Sfty	PD	Int	Yds	Avg	Lng	TD	FF	FR	Yds	TD	Fum
2020	KC	16	1	27	14	13	2.0	4	0	0	0	0	0.0	0	0	1	**1**	-3	0	1
2021	KC	**17**	1	29	13	16	2.0	0	0	1	**1**	0	0.0	0	0	**2**	0	–	–	0
2022	KC	5	0	8	4	4	1.0	1	0	0	0	0	0.0	0	0	0	0	–	–	0
2023	KC	**17**	1	21	7	14	2.0	2	0	0	0	0	0.0	0	0	0	**1**	0	0	0
2024	KC	**17**	**10**	29	**18**	11	**6.5**	**7**	0	**2**	0	0	0.0	0	0	1	0	–	–	0
2025	CAR	9	9	**36**	11	**25**	2.0	2	0	1	0	0	0.0	0	0	0	0	–	–	0
Career		81	22	150	67	83	15.5	16	0	4	1	0	0.0	0	0	4	2	-3	0	1

=== Postseason ===
Year	Team	Games		Tackles						Interceptions						Fumbles				
Year	Team	GP	GS	Cmb	Solo	Ast	Sck	TFL	Sfty	PD	Int	Yds	Avg	Lng	TD	FF	FR	Yds	TD	Fum
2020	KC	3	0	4	0	4	0.0	0	0	0	0	0	0.0	0	0	0	0	–	–	0
2021	KC	3	0	1	1	0	1.0	**1**	0	**1**	0	0	0.0	0	0	0	0	–	–	0
2022	KC	0	0	Did not play due to injury																
2023	KC	4	0	7	2	**5**	1.0	**1**	0	0	0	0	0.0	0	0	0	0	–	–	0
2024	KC	3	2	**8**	**5**	3	**2.0**	**1**	0	0	0	0	0.0	0	0	0	0	–	–	0
2025	CAR	1	1	2	1	1	0.0	**1**	0	0	0	0	0.0	0	0	0	0	–	–	0
Career		14	3	22	9	13	4.0	4	0	1	0	0	0.0	0	0	0	0	0	0	0
