= The World Is the Home of Love and Death =

World Is The Home Of Love And Death

First edition (publ. Metropolitan Books)

The World Is the Home of Love and Death: Stories is a collection of short stories written by Harold Brodkey and first published posthumously in 1997. Most of the stories were written to be part of his novel The Runaway Soul and concern its characters. Four of the eleven stories ("The Bullies", "Spring Fugue", "What I Do for Money", and "Dumbness is Everything") were originally printed in The New Yorker and one ("Religion") in Glimmer Train, from 1986 to 1996. The Runaway Soul stories are from the perspective of that novel's protagonist, Wiley Silenowicz. They detail his life from infancy, as a deathly ill child separated from his biological mother; through his childhood, living with stepparents Lila and S.L. and sister Nonie; adolescence, caring for the dying S.L.; and finally into adulthood, where he finds acceptance from the artistic community for his exceptional writing talents.

== Stories ==
- "The Bullies."
- "Spring Fugue."
- "What I Do for Money."
- "Religion."
- "Waking."
- "Car Buying."
- "Lila and S.L."
- "Jibber-Jabber in Little Rock."
- "The World Is the Home of Love and Death."
- "Dumbness Is Everything."
- "A Guest in the Universe."
