= Bernard Gilkey =

American baseball player (born 1966)

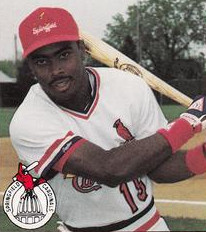
- Gilkey in 1988
- Left fielder
- Born: September 24, 1966 (age 59); St. Louis, Missouri, U.S.
- Batted: Right Threw: Right

MLB debut
- September 4, 1990, for the St. Louis Cardinals

Last MLB appearance
- October 7, 2001, for the Atlanta Braves

MLB statistics
- Batting average: .275
- Home runs: 118
- Runs batted in: 546
- Stats at Baseball Reference

Teams
- St. Louis Cardinals (1990–1995); New York Mets (1996–1998); Arizona Diamondbacks (1998–2000); Boston Red Sox (2000); Atlanta Braves (2001)

Otis Bernard Gilkey (born September 24, 1966) is an American former professional baseball left fielder. He played in Major League Baseball (MLB) for the St. Louis Cardinals, New York Mets, Arizona Diamondbacks, Boston Red Sox, and Atlanta Braves. He is currently a coach for the Palm Beach Cardinals.

== Career ==
Gilkey played basketball at St. Louis's University City High School and signed a letter of intent to play college basketball for Drake University. However, fearing that he was not tall enough to be a great basketball player, he chose to sign with the St. Louis Cardinals as an undrafted free agent after graduating from high school in 1984.

In 1989, Gilkey led the league with 53 stolen bases and 109 runs while playing for the Double-A Arkansas Travelers. In 1990, he led the league with 75 walks while playing with Triple-A Louisville Redbirds and eventually reached the MLB team. In 1991, he was the first rookie to start for the Cardinals on opening day in left field since Hall of Famer Red Schoendienst in 1945.

In 1992, Gilkey hit .302 in 131 games with the Cardinals. Gilkey batted over .300 twice more during his career.

In January 1996, Gilkey was traded by the Cardinals to the New York Mets. Gilkey had his strongest season in 1996. His .317 average was eighth in the National League, while his 44 doubles ranked fourth (and also set a Mets single-season record). Gilkey finished fourteenth in National League MVP voting that year. Gilkey and center fielder Lance Johnson formed a formidable offensive one-two punch as outfielders in their first year with the Mets. Gilkey led the league with 18 outfield assists from that year—one of six double-digit assist years in his career, with his career-high being 19 outfield assists in 1993, which tied for the league lead.

Gilkey's statistics dropped off substantially the next year, as his batting average fell to .249. In 1998, Gilkey was traded to the Arizona Diamondbacks. Gilkey's offensive numbers were less impressive in the latter years of his career and his playing time declined, although he did rebound to hit .294 in 1999. He was released by the Diamondbacks in the middle of the 2000 season and signed with the Boston Red Sox as a free agent. Gilkey made the playoffs as a Diamondback in 1999 and in 2001 with the Atlanta Braves. Gilkey's career ended after the 2001 season.

== Career statistics ==
In 1239 games over 12 seasons, Gilkey posted a .275 batting average (1115-for-4061) with 606 runs, 244 doubles, 24 triples, 118 home runs, 546 RBI, 115 stolen bases, 466 walks, 352 on-base percentage and .434 slugging percentage. Defensively, he recorded an overall .983 fielding percentage.

== Personal life ==
As of 2014, Gilkey was living in St. Louis with his wife, Patrice. They had two sons, Jaelen and Caeven. Jaelen played baseball in NCAA Division II at Miles College and Caeven played at High Point University.

Gilkey had a small role in the 1997 film Men in Black. The climax of the film took place in Flushing Meadows-Corona Park in New York City near Shea Stadium, home of the Mets. Gilkey appeared in his real-life role as a Mets outfielder. Gilkey was distracted by a massive spacecraft above Shea Stadium (actually one of the two circular observation towers from the 1964 World's Fair) and was hit on the head by a fly ball.
