= Harold Brodkey =

American short story writer and novelist (1930–1996)

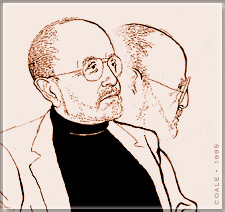
- Harold Brodkey, by Howard Coale for The New Yorker, 1995
- Born: Aaron Roy Weintraub; October 25, 1930; Staunton, Illinois, U.S.
- Died: January 26, 1996 (aged 65); New York City, New York, U.S.
- Occupation: Writer
- Awards: O. Henry Award (1975 & 1976)

Harold Brodkey (October 25, 1930 – January 26, 1996), born Aaron Roy Weintraub, was an American short story writer and novelist.

== Life ==
Aaron Weintraub was born to a Jewish family in Staunton, Illinois on October 25, 1930. He was the second child of Max Weintraub and Celia Glazer Weintraub (1899–1932). Samuel Weintraub (1928–2017) was their oldest child. When their mother died, Samuel was four and old enough to remain with his father, but Aaron, only two years old, was adopted by his father's cousin, Doris Rubenstein Brodkey (1896–1949) and her husband, Joseph Brodkey (1896–1946) and renamed Harold Roy Brodkey. Doris and Joseph lived in University City, Missouri, with their daughter, Marilyn Ruth Brodkey (1923–2011). Brodkey would chronicle his life with his adoptive parents and sister in his short stories and his novel, The Runaway Soul.

After graduating cum laude from Harvard University with an Bachelor of Arts in 1952, Brodkey married his first wife, Joanna Brown, a Radcliffe graduate, and their only child, Ann Emily Brodkey, was born in 1953. With the aid of his editor, William Maxwell, a childhood friend of his wife, he began his writing career by contributing short stories to The New Yorker and other magazines. His stories received two first-place O. Henry Awards. Brodkey was a staff writer for The New Yorker until the end of his life.

In 1993, Brodkey announced in The New Yorker that he had contracted AIDS; he later wrote This Wild Darkness: The Story of My Death (1996), about his battle with the disease. At the time of his death in 1996, he was living in New York City with his second wife, novelist Ellen Brodkey (née Schwamm). Brodkey contracted the HIV virus from a homosexual relationship, although he reportedly did not consider himself to be gay.

== Literary career ==
Brodkey's literary career began with the short story collection First Love and Other Sorrows, published in 1958.

Six years later, he signed a book contract with Random House for his first novel, tentatively titled A Party of Animals (it was also referred to as The Animal Corner). The unfinished novel was subsequently resold to Farrar, Straus & Giroux in 1970, then to Knopf in 1979. As a Paris Review interview noted, "The work became something of an object of desire for editors; it was moved among publishing houses for what were rumored to be ever-increasing advances, advertised as a forthcoming title (Party of Animals) in book catalogs, expanded and ceaselessly revised, until its publication seemed an event longer awaited than anything without theological implications." In 1983, the Saturday Review referred to A Party of Animals as "now reportedly comprising 4,000 pages and announced as forthcoming 'next year' every year since 1973."

During this period, Brodkey published a number of stories, most of them in The New Yorker, that dealt with a set of recurring characters—the autobiographical Wiley Silenowicz and his adoptive family—and which were announced as fragments of the novel. Critics who disliked Brodkey's work described his tone as too talkative and overly focused on his own childhood. Several weeks after Brodkey announced in The New Yorker in 1993 that he was suffering from AIDS, the Pulitzer Prize-winning poet Richard Howard wrote in The New Republic that the disclosure was "a matter of manipulative hucksterism, of mendacious self-propaganda and cruel assertion of artistic privilege, whereby death is made a matter of public relations."

In addition to publishing, Brodkey earned a living during this period by writing television pilot scripts for NBC, and teaching at Cornell University. Three long stories from A Party of Animals were collected in Women and Angels (1985), and a larger number, including those three, appeared in 1988's Stories in an Almost Classical Mode. Brodkey had apparently decided to omit them from the novel, for when, in 1991, he published The Runaway Soul, a very long novel (835 pages) dramatizing Wiley's early life, no material from Stories in an Almost Classical Mode was included. The novel seems to be either A Party of Animals under a new title or the first volume of an eventual multivolume work. Brodkey made some comments that suggested the latter.

Brodkey's second novel, Profane Friendship, was published in 1994.

== Bibliography ==
=== Short story collections ===
- First Love and Other Sorrows (1958, ISBN 0-8050-6010-3)
- Women and Angels (1985, ISBN 0-8276-0250-2) (3 stories, all later included in his 1988 collection).
- Stories in an Almost Classical Mode (1988, ISBN 0-679-72431-1)
- The World is the Home of Love and Death (1997, ISBN 0-8050-5999-7)

=== Novels ===
- The Runaway Soul (1991, ISBN 0-374-25286-6)
- Profane Friendship (1994, ISBN 0-374-52973-6)

=== Non-fiction ===
- This Wild Darkness: The Story of My Death (1996, ISBN 0-8050-4831-6)
- My Venice (1998, ISBN 0-8050-4833-2)
- Sea Battles on Dry Land: Essays (1999, ISBN 0-8050-6052-9)

=== Short stories ===
Title	Publication	Collected in
"The State of Grace"	The New Yorker (November 6, 1954)	First Love and Other Sorrows
"Laura" aka "Fanny"	The New Yorker (December 11, 1954)	First Love and Other Sorrows
"The Quarrel"	The New Yorker (July 23, 1955)	First Love and Other Sorrows
"Laurie Dressing" aka "Cassie Dressing"	The New Yorker (November 12, 1955)	First Love and Other Sorrows
"Gloria Mundi"	Discovery 6 (1955)	First Love and Other Sorrows (1998 edition)
"The Sound of Moorish Laughter"	Harper's Magazine (May 1956)	First Love and Other Sorrows (1998 edition)
"Trio for Three Gentle Voices"	Mademoiselle (July 1956)	First Love and Other Sorrows
"Piping Down the Valleys Wild"	The New Yorker (May 11, 1957)	First Love and Other Sorrows
"First Love and Other Sorrows"	The New Yorker (June 15, 1957)	First Love and Other Sorrows
"Sentimental Education"	The New Yorker (July 6, 1957)	First Love and Other Sorrows
"The Dark Woman of the Sonnets"	The New Yorker (August 24, 1957)	First Love and Other Sorrows
"The Abundant Dreamer"	The New Yorker (November 23, 1963)	Stories in an Almost Classical Mode
"A Well-Regulated Impulse"	Esquire (October 1964)	First Love and Other Stories (1998 edition)
"On the Waves"	The New Yorker (September 4, 1965)	Stories in an Almost Classical Mode
"Bookkeeping"	The New Yorker (April 27, 1968)	Stories in an Almost Classical Mode
"Hofstedt and Jean—and Others"	The New Yorker (January 25, 1969)	Stories in an Almost Classical Mode
"The Shooting Range"	The New Yorker (September 13, 1969)	Stories in an Almost Classical Mode
"Innocence"	American Review 16 (February 1973)	Stories in an Almost Classical Mode
"Play"	American Review 17 (May 1973)	Stories in an Almost Classical Mode
"A Story in an Almost Classical Mode" aka "Lila"	The New Yorker (September 17, 1973)	Stories in an Almost Classical Mode
"His Son, in His Arms, in Light, Aloft"	Esquire (August 1975)	Stories in an Almost Classical Mode
"Puberty"	Esquire (December 1975)	Stories in an Almost Classical Mode
"Largely an Oral History of My Mother"	The New Yorker (April 26, 1976)	Stories in an Almost Classical Mode
"The Pain Continuum"	Partisan Review 43.1 (1976)	Stories in an Almost Classical Mode
"Verona: A Young Woman Speaks"	Esquire (July 1977)	Stories in an Almost Classical Mode
"Ceil"	The New Yorker (September 12, 1983)	Stories in an Almost Classical Mode
"Nonie"	The New Yorker (March 5, 1985)	from The Runaway Soul
"S.L."	The New Yorker (September 9, 1985)	Stories in an Almost Classical Mode
"The Boys on Their Bikes" aka "Falling and Ascending Bodies"	Vanity Fair (March 1985)	Stories in an Almost Classical Mode
"Angel"	Women and Angels (1985)	Stories in an Almost Classical Mode
"The Bullies"	The New Yorker (June 30, 1986)	The World Is the Home of Love and Death
"The Nurse's Music" aka "Annemarie Singing"	The New Yorker (August 22, 1988)	Stories in an Almost Classical Mode
"Spring Fugue"	The New Yorker (April 23, 1990)	The World Is the Home of Love and Death
"A Kingdom of Sadness"	The New Yorker (October 7, 1991)	from The Runaway Soul
"What I Do for Money"	The New Yorker (October 18, 1993)	The World Is the Home of Love and Death
"Religion"	Glimmer Train 14 (Spring 1995)	The World Is the Home of Love and Death
"Dumbness Is Everything"	The New Yorker (October 7, 1996)	The World Is the Home of Love and Death
"Waking"	The World Is the Home of Love and Death (1997)	The World Is the Home of Love and Death
"Car Buying"	The World Is the Home of Love and Death (1997)	The World Is the Home of Love and Death
"Lila and S.L."	The World Is the Home of Love and Death (1997)	The World Is the Home of Love and Death
"Jibber-Jabber in Little Rock"	The World Is the Home of Love and Death (1997)	The World Is the Home of Love and Death
"The World Is the Home of Love and Death"	The World Is the Home of Love and Death (1997)	The World Is the Home of Love and Death
"A Guest in the Universe"	The World Is the Home of Love and Death (1997)	The World Is the Home of Love and Death
