= University City, Missouri =

City in Missouri, US

- City
- City of University City
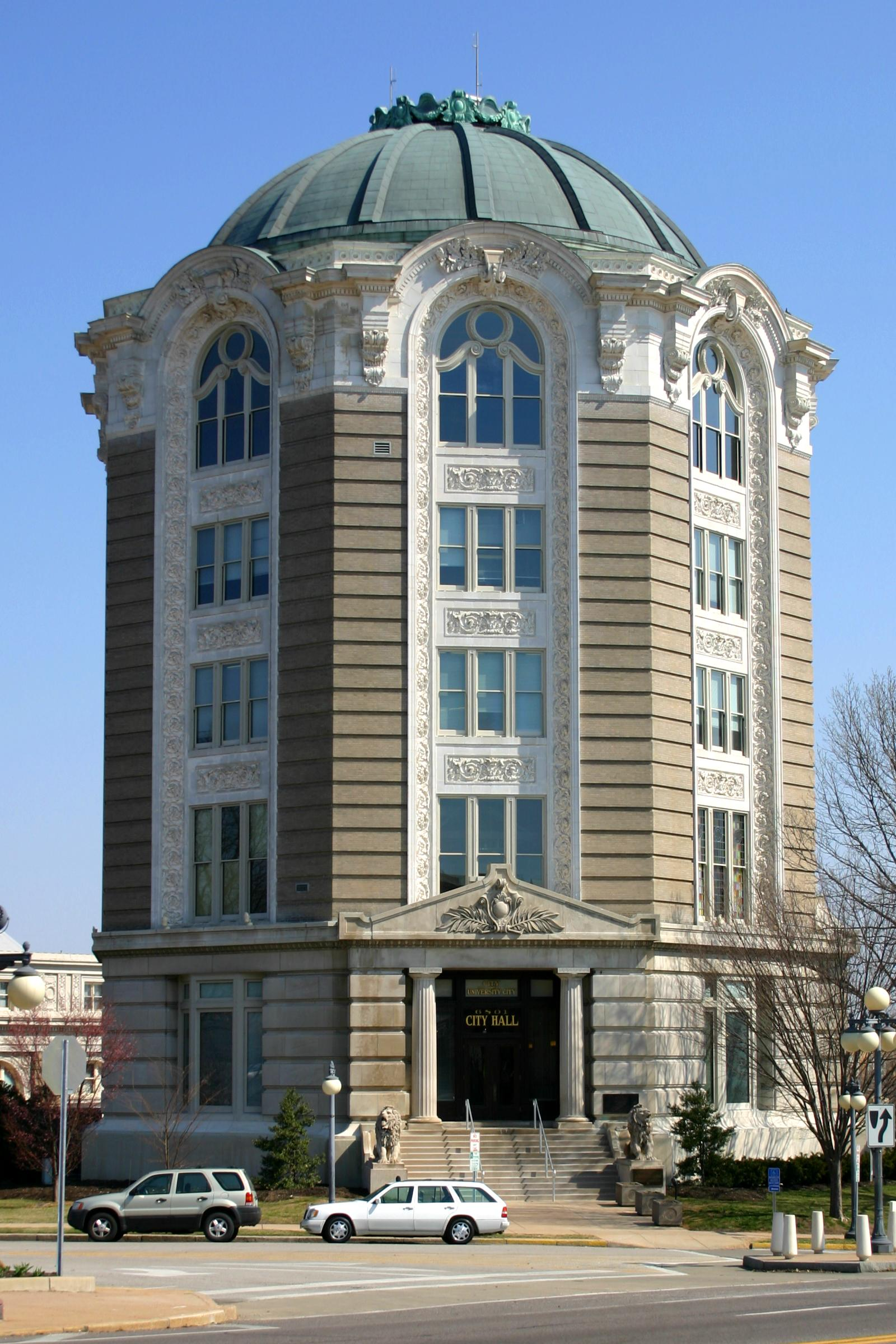
- The University City City Hall building
- Nickname: "U City"
- Location in St. Louis County

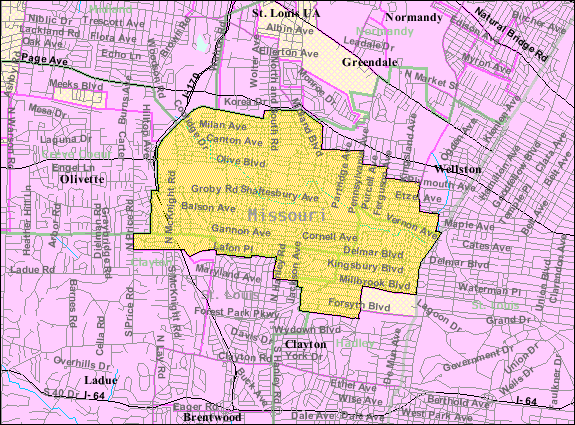
- U.S. Census Map
- Coordinates: 38°39′57″N 90°19′54″W
- Country: United States of America
- State: Missouri
- County: St. Louis

Government
  - Type: Home Rule Charter city with Council-Manager form of government
  - Mayor: Terry Crow

Area
  - Total: 5.88 sq mi (15.23 km^{2})
  - Land: 5.88 sq mi (15.23 km^{2})
  - Water: 0 sq mi (0.00 km^{2})
- Elevation: 525 ft (160 m)

Population (2020)
  - Total: 35,065
  - Density: 5,961.4/sq mi (2,301.72/km^{2})
- Demonym: University Citizen
- Time zone: UTC−6 (Central (CST))
  - Summer (DST): UTC−5 (CDT)
- FIPS code: 29-75220
- GNIS feature ID: 2397091
- Website: www.ucitymo.org

University City (colloquially, U. City) is an inner-ring suburb of the City of St. Louis in St. Louis County, Missouri, United States. The population was measured at 35,065 by the 2020 census.

== Description ==
The city is one of the older suburbs in the St. Louis area, having been a streetcar suburb in the late 19th and early 20th centuries; much historic architecture remains in the southern, older portion of the city, particularly along Delmar Boulevard. The northern portions of the city, mostly developed after World War II, have more of a suburban feel with many shopping centers and other automobile-centered development. The city is named for nearby Washington University.

University City has much municipal open space, the largest parcels being 85-acre (340,000 m^{2}) Heman Park (which includes recreation and community centers and public pool facilities) and Ruth Park (a public golf course and nature trails). The city has four elementary schools, one middle school, two Catholic grade schools, one Jewish high school, and one public high school. The School District of University City is separately managed from other school districts in the area.

== History ==
In the late 19th century, the area that is now University City was primarily farms and small farming communities. In 1902, Edward Gardner Lewis purchased 85 acres just outside the city limits of St. Louis, northwest of Forest Park, where the St. Louis World’s Fair would be held two years later in 1904. Lewis was the publisher of Woman’s Magazine and Woman’s Farm Journal. The 85-acre area would be the headquarters for Lewis’s publishing company, as well the site for a model city, inspired by the City Beautiful movement.

In 1903, Lewis broke ground for his publishing company’s headquarters: the Magazine Building (now City Hall), an ornate octagonal 135-foot tower. Soon, other architecturally significant structures and developments were erected, including an austere Egyptian temple, the Art Academy, and the Lion Gates. The Egyptian temple once served as a Masonic Temple and is now home to the Church of Scientology of St. Louis. The Art Academy and the Lion Gates were designed by the Eames & Young architecture firm, which enlisted sculptor George Julian Zolnay to create the Lion Gates.

University City was formally incorporated in September 1906 and Lewis became its first mayor. Between 1910 and 1920, University City grew faster than any other city in Missouri. By the 1920s, University City’s main business corridor, along Delmar Boulevard just north of Washington University, was a bustling commercial district with new multifamily housing attracting new residents. Streetcars were the primary mode of transportation for shoppers and residents alike. After World War II, the city experienced its greatest housing construction.

In the 1960s, Black people displaced by urban renewal projects in the city of St. Louis began to move west into St. Louis County. "University City was the first county municipality to struggle with the issues of fair housing and traditions of segregation," Nini Harris wrote. One innovative and controversial attempt to combat segregation was The University City Home Rental Trust.

== Geography ==
University City's southern border is approximated by Northmoor. The eastern border is approximated by Skinker Boulevard. The western border is approximated by old McKnight, some of which is now Interstate 170.

According to the United States Census Bureau, the city has a total area of 5.90 square miles (15.28 km^{2}), all of it land.

The highest point of University City is the western terminus of Delmar Boulevard, at the tri-border of University City, Ladue, and Olivette.

The city also contains part of Midland Boulevard, which divides the watersheds of the Mississippi River and the Missouri River. The River Des Peres rises in the hills near the University City and Clayton boundary, flows north, takes a strong turn at Ruth Park, and then runs through culverts southeast through the city of St. Louis to debouche in the Mississippi River.

=== Surrounding areas ===
Vinita Park / Pagedale
Overland Wellston
Olivette St. Louis
Ladue St. Louis
Clayton

== Demographics ==
The city has long had a large middle-class Jewish presence. Jewish cemeteries and religious centers dot the city, such as Young Israel of St. Louis and Agudas Israel of St. Louis, serving University City residents and those of nearby Clayton, which also has a high concentration of Jewish residents.

=== Racial and ethnic composition ===
University City, Missouri – Racial and ethnic composition Note: the US Census treats Hispanic/Latino as an ethnic category. This table excludes Latinos from the racial categories and assigns them to a separate category. Hispanics/Latinos may be of any race.
Race / Ethnicity (NH = Non-Hispanic)	Pop 2000	Pop 2010	Pop 2020	% 2000	% 2010	% 2020
White alone (NH)	18,112	17,417	16,876	48.39%	49.24%	48.13%
Black or African American alone (NH)	16,895	14,450	12,774	45.14%	40.85%	36.43%
Native American or Alaska Native alone (NH)	54	69	35	0.14%	0.20%	0.10%
Asian alone (NH)	1,060	1,498	2,256	2.83%	4.24%	6.43%
Native Hawaiian or Pacific Islander alone (NH)	8	4	16	0.02%	0.01%	0.05%
Other race alone (NH)	94	83	264	0.25%	0.23%	0.75%
Mixed race or Multiracial (NH)	622	871	1,464	1.66%	2.46%	4.18%
Hispanic or Latino (any race)	583	979	1,380	1.56%	2.77%	3.94%
Total	37,428	35,371	35,065	100.00%	100.00%	100.00%

Historical population
Census	Pop.	Note	%±
1910	2,417		—
1920	6,792		181.0%
1930	25,809		280.0%
1940	33,023		28.0%
1950	39,892		20.8%
1960	51,249		28.5%
1970	47,527		−7.3%
1980	42,690		−10.2%
1990	40,087		−6.1%
2000	37,428		−6.6%
2010	35,371		−5.5%
2020	35,065		−0.9%
U.S. Decennial Census

=== 2020 census ===
As of the 2020 census, University City had a population of 35,065, with 16,015 households and 8,064 families.

The median age was 37.2 years. 17.0% of residents were under the age of 18 and 19.7% were 65 years of age or older. For every 100 females there were 87.3 males, and for every 100 females age 18 and over there were 83.7 males age 18 and over.

There were 16,015 households in University City, of which 20.5% had children under the age of 18 living in them. Of all households, 32.4% were married-couple households, 22.5% were households with a male householder and no spouse or partner present, and 38.6% were households with a female householder and no spouse or partner present. About 38.2% of all households were made up of individuals and 13.7% had someone living alone who was 65 years of age or older. The average household size was 2.1 and the average family size was 2.9.

There were 18,019 housing units, of which 11.1% were vacant. The homeowner vacancy rate was 1.8% and the rental vacancy rate was 9.9%.

100.0% of residents lived in urban areas, while 0.0% lived in rural areas.

Racial composition as of the 2020 census
Race	Number	Percent
White	17,145	48.9%
Black or African American	12,843	36.6%
American Indian and Alaska Native	64	0.2%
Asian	2,273	6.5%
Native Hawaiian and Other Pacific Islander	18	0.1%
Some other race	695	2.0%
Two or more races	2,027	5.8%
Hispanic or Latino (of any race)	1,380	3.9%

=== 2010 census ===
As of the census of 2010, there were 35,371 people, 16,154 households, and 8,484 families living in the city. The population density was 5,995.1 inhabitants per square mile (2,314.7/km^{2}). There were 18,021 housing units at an average density of 3,054.4 per square mile (1,179.3/km^{2}). The racial makeup of the city was 50.8% White, 41.1% African American, 0.3% Native American, 4.3% Asian, 0.9% from other races, and 2.7% from two or more races. Hispanic or Latino of any race were 2.8% of the population.

There were 16,154 households, of which 23.8% had children under the age of 18 living with them, 33.8% were married couples living together, 15.0% had a female householder with no husband present, 3.7% had a male householder with no wife present, and 47.5% were non-families. 36.5% of all households were made up of individuals, and 12.7% had someone living alone who was 65 years of age or older. The average household size was 2.18 and the average family size was 2.90.

The median age in the city was 37.4 years. 19.5% of residents were under the age of 18; 11.3% were between the ages of 18 and 24; 28.5% were from 25 to 44; 24.7% were from 45 to 64; and 16% were 65 years of age or older. The gender makeup of the city was 46.6% male and 53.4% female.

=== 2000 census ===
As of the census of 2000, there were 37,428 people, 16,453 households, and 9,114 families living in the city. The population density was 6,363.1 inhabitants per square mile (2,456.8/km^{2}). There were 17,485 housing units at an average density of 2,972.6 per square mile (1,147.7/km^{2}). The racial makeup of the city was 49.26% White, 45.35% African American, 0.16% Native American, 2.85% Asian, 0.03% Pacific Islander, 0.56% from other races, and 1.80% from two or more races. Hispanic or Latino of any race were 1.56% of the population. The city is considered (by inhabitants) to be divided roughly into three zones from north to south. North of Olive is predominantly Black, from Olive to Delmar is mixed, and south of Delmar is predominantly White. Because of the city's racial composition, it has not been part of the integration busing program between the City of St. Louis and St. Louis County.

There were 16,453 households, out of which 23.7% had children under the age of 18 living with them, 36.3% were married couples living together, 16.3% had a female householder with no husband present, and 44.6% were non-families. 34.2% of all households were made up of individuals, and 10.2% had someone living alone who was 65 years of age or older. The average household size was 2.25 and the average family size was 2.96.

In the city, the population was spread out, with 21.8% under the age of 18, 11.3% from 18 to 24, 31.1% from 25 to 44, 22.4% from 45 to 64, and 13.3% who were 65 years of age or older. The median age was 35 years. For every 100 females, there were 84.1 males. For every 100 females age 18 and over, there were 80.1 males.

The median income for a household in the city was $75,902, and the median income for a family was $90,539. Males had a median income of $55,588 versus $45,440 for females. The per capita income for the city was $26,901. About 9.5% of families and 14.7% of the population were below the poverty line, including 19.1% of those under age 18 and 12.1% of those age 65 or over.

== Education ==
The School District of University City operates public schools.

University City has one high school: University City High School. The city also has one middle school, Brittany Woods Middle School, and four elementary schools: Flynn Park, Barbara C. Jordan, Pershing and Jackson Park. It is also home to two Catholic grade schools: Our Lady of Lourdes and Christ the King.

University City Public Library serves the community.

== Highways ==
Major roads and highways in University City are Interstate 170 (I-170), Missouri Route 340 (MO-340), Delmar Boulevard, Forest Park Parkway, Olive Boulevard and Skinker Parkway.

The MetroLink Blue Line stops at the University City–Big Bend and Skinker stations on the city’s southern edge, and MetroBus routes such as the 91 Olive operate along major corridors including Olive Boulevard.

== Culture ==
The bus stop that apprears in the post-credits scene of the final episode of The Amazing Digital Circus, decorated with fanart by fans.

University City has a public library at 6701 Delmar Boulevard. Established in 1939, the library houses more than 150,000 volumes as well as music and spoken recordings, videotape and DVD collections, and works of art. The library is open seven days a week, including five evenings. University City has 17 parks and one 9-hole golf course, Ruth Park Golf Course.

University City is home to COCA, the Center Of Creative Arts, which has a nationally recognized pre-professional dance training program. Alumni have danced for Trisha Brown, Cecil Slaughter, Houston Ballet, Ballet Hispanico New York, Mark Morris, Alvin Ailey, the national tours of Wicked and Cinderella, and Tarzan on Broadway.

The largest park is Heman Park (85.26 acres). A bus stop serving Heman Park was used as a filming location for the final scene of the web series The Amazing Digital Circus; the bus stop was identified by fans and subsequently become a tourist attraction.

=== Chinatown ===
In recent decades, efforts have been made to establish a successor to the earlier ethnic neighborhood of Chinatown in the city of St. Louis. A number of Asian grocery stores and restaurants exist along Olive Boulevard between I-170 and Skinker Boulevard in University City. The route contains mostly Chinese businesses, rather than residents. Although efforts were made to designate part of the area as "Chinatown", surrounding community members objected to the proposals. Also, the Missouri Department of Transportation has jurisdiction over part of Olive Boulevard and does not permit decorative archways or gateways spanning the roadway, as can be seen in other Chinatowns. As a result, there is no officially designated Chinatown in the St. Louis area. Since 2016, the University City government has sought to foster economic development along the corridor with tax incentives and by rebranding it "University City Olive Link".

=== Delmar Loop ===
The Delmar Loop, an entertainment, cultural and restaurant district, sits along Delmar Boulevard, parallel to and six blocks north of the northern boundary of the university. Among the more prominent businesses in the Delmar Loop is Blueberry Hill, a restaurant and concert venue owned by Joe Edwards and Linda Edwards at 6504 Delmar Boulevard. Opened in 1972, its concert venue, The Duck Room, is noted for its relationship with the musician Chuck Berry, who performed there over 200 times.

The Loop is also home to the St. Louis Walk of Fame, which as of April 2020 memorializes more than 150 St. Louisans with brass stars embedded in the sidewalk.

== Politics ==
- Mayor: Terry Crow
- City Manager: Brooke Sharp
- Boards and Commissions
- City Council:
  - 1st Ward: Steve McMahon & Jeff Hales
  - 2nd Ward: John Tieman & Dennis Fuller
  - 3rd Ward: Bwayne Smotherson & Stacy Clay

== Notable people ==
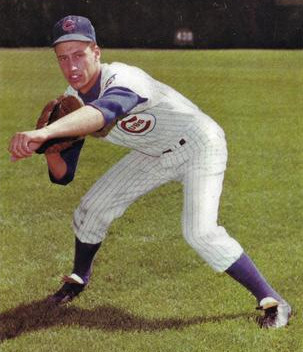
Ken Holtzman

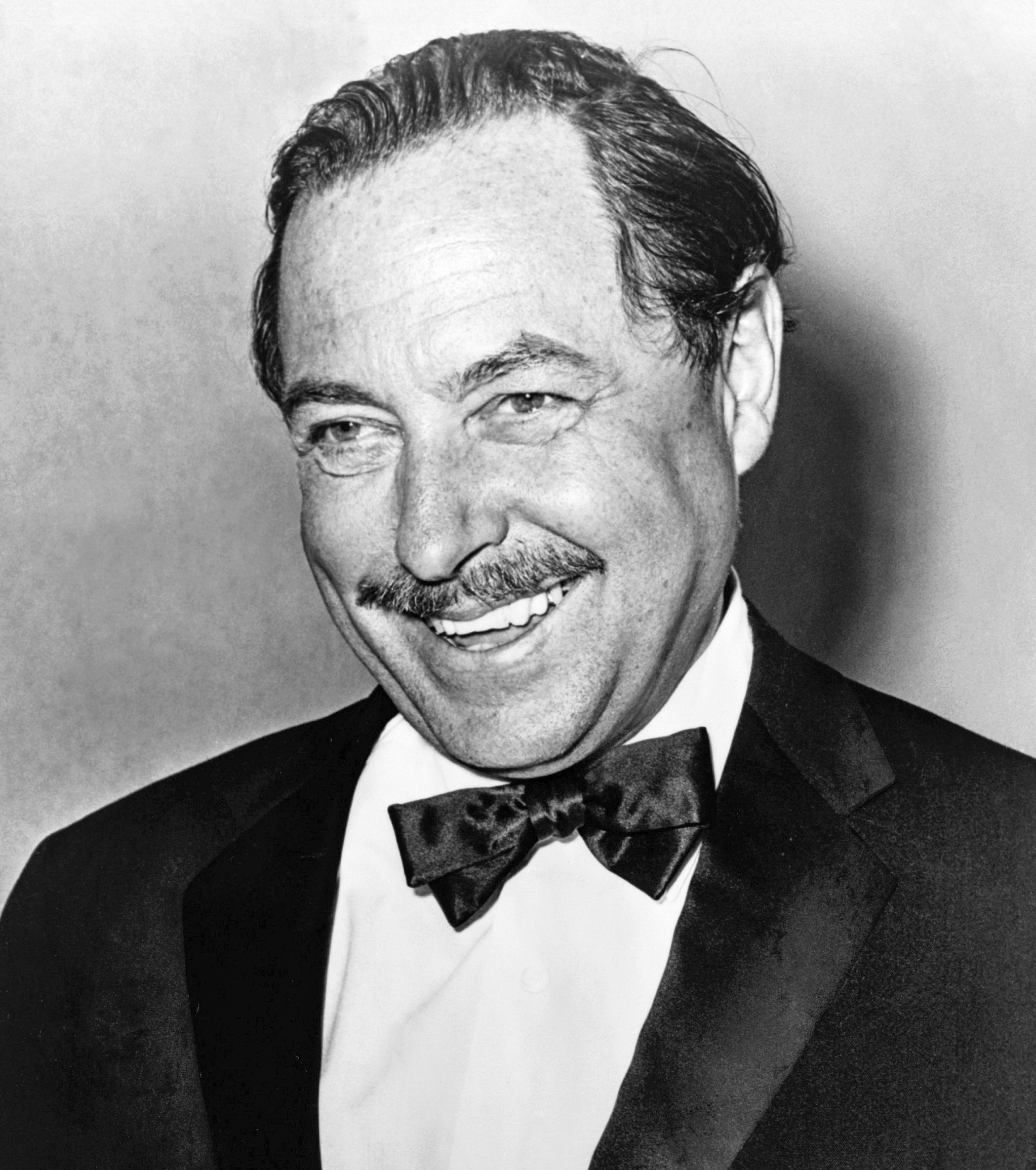
Tennessee Williams

- Harold Brodkey, short-story writer and novelist
- Lacy Clay, Congressman
- Hallowell Davis (1896–1992), pioneer in studying the physiology of hearing, at the Central Institute for the Deaf
- Stanley Elkin, novelist
- Gabe Fleisher, journalist and author of Wake Up To Politics
- Jane Froman, singer and actress whose life story was told in 1952 film With a Song in My Heart
- Bob Gale, screenwriter (Back to the Future) and movie producer
- Dave Garroway (1913-1982), host of many national TV shows in the '50s and '60s, including The Today Show and Wide Wide World
- Bernard Gilkey, player for five Major League Baseball teams
- John Hartford, composer ("Gentle on My Mind") and folk musician
- Ken Hitchcock, NHL head coach
- Ken Holtzman, MLB pitcher; threw two no-hitters and won 174 games for the Chicago Cubs
- J.C.R. Licklider, Internet pioneer
- Jeremiyah Love, NFL running back
- Patrick McCaw, NBA basketball player
- Nelly, rapper
- Howard Nemerov, poet
- James Peniston, sculptor
- Robert Person, MLB pitcher
- Art Shamsky, MLB player, Israel Baseball League manager
- Mike Shanahan, owner of St. Louis Blues hockey team (1986–95)
- Jayson Tatum, NBA player
- Tershawn Wharton, NFL player
- Tennessee Williams, Pulitzer Prize-winning playwright; attended University City High School
- Ike Willis, singer and sideman for Frank Zappa from 1978 to 1988

== See also ==
- List of cities in Missouri
- Delmar Loop Trolley
- Louisiana Purchase Exposition, also known as the 1904 World's Fair
- 1904 Summer Olympics, held a short distance from University City, on the Washington University Campus
- The University City Home Rental Trust, an attempt to combat racist real estate sales practices
