= Normandie Golf Club =

Golf course in Missouri, U.S.

- Location within Missouri
- 38°41′42″N 90°19′05″W

Club information
- Location: St. Louis, Missouri
- Established: 1901
- Type: Public
- Tota holes: 18
- Website: normandiegolf.com
- Designed by: Robert Foulis
- Par: 71
- Length: 6,534 yards (5,970 m)
- Course rating: 70.6
- Slope rating: 124

Normandie Golf Club is a public golf course in St. Louis, Missouri and is one of the oldest public golf courses west of the Mississippi River.

The par-71 18-hole golf course was designed and built by Robert Foulis in 1901.

In April 2021, the Metropolitan Golf Foundation announced that Jack Nicklaus and his golf architecture firm Nicklaus Design had joined and would lead the philanthropic effort to renovate the golf course.

In November 2023 the course closed to begin the renovation. It is slated to re-open at the end of 2025.

== Scorecard ==
Normandie Golf Club
Tee	Rating/Slope	1	2	3	4	5	6	7	8	9	Out	10	11	12	13	14	15	16	17	18	In	Total
Par		4	4	3	5	3	4	5	4	4	36	4	4	3	4	4	5	3	5	3	35	71
Blue	M:70.6/124	446	430	209	467	170	329	572	318	423	3364	420	412	136	310	411	468	190	573	250	3170	6534
White	M:69.1/119 W:73.7/129	365	410	190	455	153	312	490	259	408	3041	407	396	117	302	403	433	174	476	241	2949	5990
Red	W:68.3/115	275	310	141	379	131	287	441	236	307	2507	300	331	107	244	323	377	119	410	181	2392	4899
SI		1	9	11	7	13	15	3	17	5		4	2	18	16	8	14	12	6	10
