= Education in Greater St. Louis =

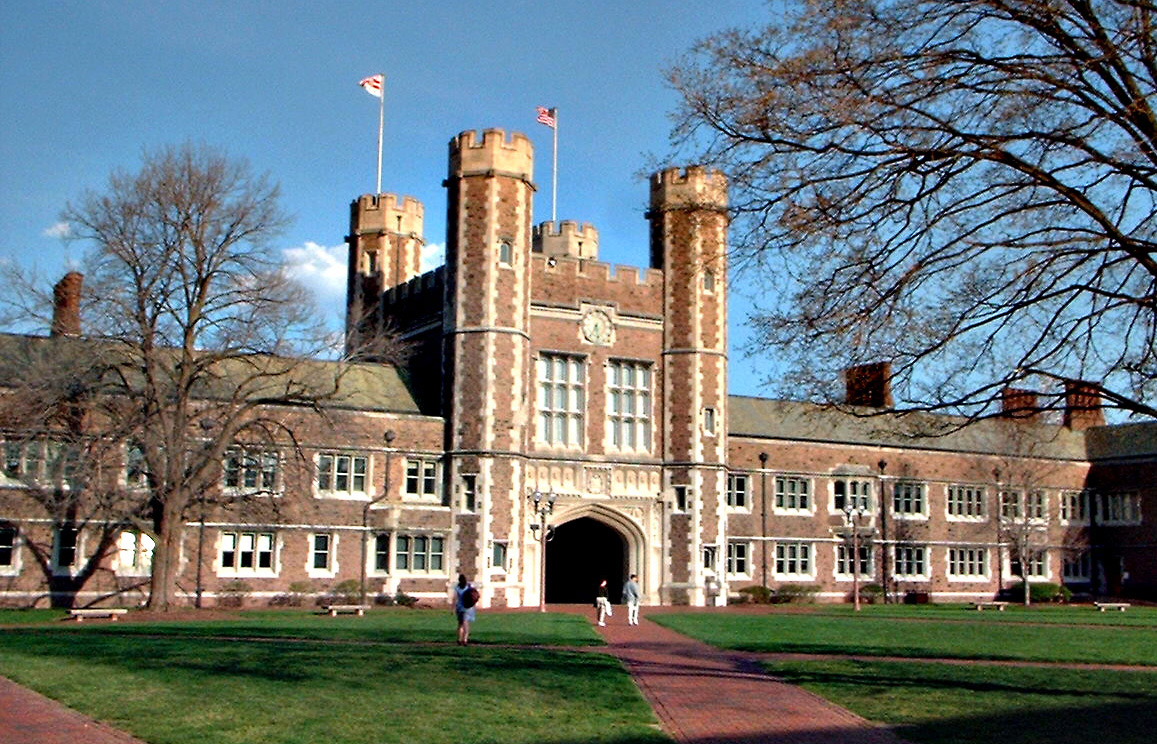
Brookings Hall, an icon of Washington University in St. Louis

Education in Greater St. Louis is provided by 132 public school districts, independent private schools, parochial schools, and several public library systems. Greater St. Louis also is home to more than thirty colleges and universities.

== Primary and secondary education ==
Greater St. Louis is home to 132 public school districts. Among the largest districts by enrollment in 2010 are the St. Louis Public Schools with 25,046 students, Rockwood School District with 22,382 students, and Fort Zumwalt School District with 18,840 students. Greater St. Louis schools also are notable for their excellence in the state of Missouri; five local public high schools being ranked nationally in the United States by Newsweek in 2011 were from Greater St. Louis: Clayton High School in Clayton School District, Metro Academic and Classical High School in the St. Louis Public Schools, Ladue Horton Watkins High School in Ladue School District, Kirkwood High School in Kirkwood School District, and Rockwood Summit High School in Rockwood School District. However, other schools have struggled financially and academically: the St. Louis Public Schools lost its accreditation and was taken over by the Missouri Board of Education, while the East St. Louis Public Schools repeatedly have been taken over by the state of Illinois due to financial problems and corruption.

Several independent private schools operate in Greater St. Louis, including Whitfield School, Mary Institute and St. Louis Country Day School, Visitation Academy of St. Louis, and John Burroughs School. Both private Catholic schools and schools under the authority of the Archdiocese of St. Louis operate in Greater St. Louis, with ten Archdiocesan high schools and more than a dozen private Catholic high schools in the region.

== Colleges and universities ==
According to the U.S. Census Bureau American Community Survey 21.4 percent of the adult population in St. Louis holds a bachelor's degree compared with the national average of 27 percent. Almost 209,000 students are enrolled in the area's nearly 40 colleges, universities, and technical schools. In 2006 approximately 5,287 associate degrees were granted in Greater St. Louis. Approximately 10% of the St. Louis metropolitan area consists of higher education students.

== Libraries ==
The oldest public library system in the area, the St. Louis Public Library, serves the city of St. Louis and maintains a collection of 4.7 million items, and it operates 14 branches and a central library building. St. Louis County Library operates 20 branches and has a collection of 2.6 million items. Both libraries have a borrowing agreement allowing them to exchange materials.

The Municipal Library Consortium of St. Louis County is an association of nine independent municipal libraries, including the Brentwood Public Library, Ferguson Municipal Public Library, Kirkwood Public Library, Maplewood Public Library, Richmond Heights Memorial Library, Rock Hill Public Library, University City Public Library, Valley Park Community Library, and the Webster Groves Public Library.

Other Missouri library systems in Greater St. Louis include the St. Charles City-County Library, which serves St. Charles County, the Powell Memorial Library, serving Troy, Missouri, the Scenic Regional Library, serving Warren and Franklin counties, and the Jefferson County Library, which serves the parts of Jefferson County that are part of Fox, Windsor and Northwest school districts.

In the Metro-East, library districts include the Wood River Public Library, serving the city of Wood River, Illinois, the East Alton Public Library, serving East Alton, Illinois, the Hayner Public Library, serving Alton, Illinois, the Edwardsville Library, serving Edwardsville, Illinois, and the Mississippi Valley Library, serving Fairmont City and Collinsville, Illinois.
