= Rock Hill, Missouri =

- City
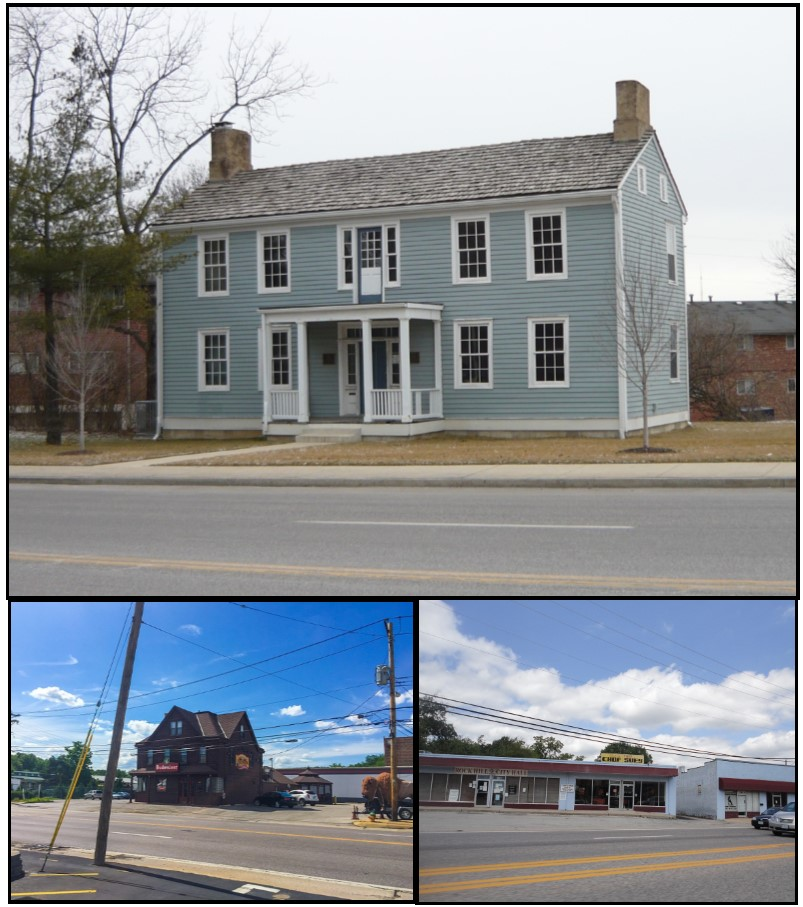
- Top: The Fairfax House, Bottom Left: Trainwreck Saloon, Bottom Right: Former Rock Hill City Hall

- Location of Rock Hill, Missouri
- Coordinates: 38°36′33″N 90°22′02″W
- Country: United States
- State: Missouri
- County: St. Louis
- Incorporated as village: April 1929
- Incorporated as city: April 1947
- Founder: James Collier Marshall

Government
  - Mayor: Edward Mahan

Area
  - Total: 1.10 sq mi (2.86 km^{2})
  - Land: 1.10 sq mi (2.86 km^{2})
  - Water: 0 sq mi (0.00 km^{2})
- Elevation: 541 ft (165 m)

Population (2020)
  - Total: 4,750
  - Density: 4,305.2/sq mi (1,662.26/km^{2})
- Time zone: UTC-6 (Central (CST))
  - Summer (DST): UTC-5 (CDT)
- ZIP Code: 63119
- Area code: 314
- FIPS code: 29-62660
- GNIS feature ID: 2396399
- Website: www.rockhillmo.net

Rock Hill is a city in St. Louis County, Missouri, United States. As of the 2020 census, Rock Hill had a population of 4,750. It is home to the Fairfax House on the National Register of Historic Places.

== Geography ==
According to the United States Census Bureau, the city has a total area of 1.09 square miles (2.82 km^{2}), all land.

Rock Hill is bounded by cities Ladue, Brentwood, Webster Groves, Glendale and Warson Woods.

Streets

Manchester Road is four lanes and runs east–west across Rock Hill. North Rock Hill Road was connected to the South McKnight Road extension in June 1962. Voters passed a $3 million bond issue to repair roads in 2000. By 2005 the fund was nearly depleted with considerable work left to be done. Voters passed a proposition in 2011 to extend the street bond issue, allowing the city to raise an additional $3.5 million.

In October 2019, the board of aldermen voted to lower the speed limit on most streets to 20 miles per hour.

== History ==
James Collier Marshall settled what became Rock Hill around 1832. He and his brother John Marshall purchased 800 acres along Manchester Road where he and his brother built a log building that operated as a home and store.

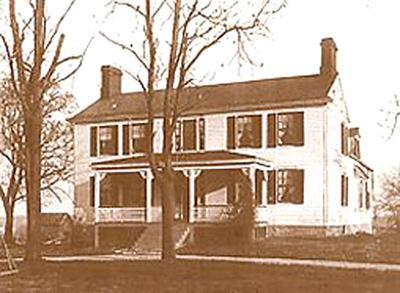
Fairfax House in 1910.

In 1839 James built a two-story weatherboard home, naming it "Fairfax" after a family friend in Maryland, Albert Kirby Fairfax, Lord Fairfax of Cameron. A year later the property was divided between James and John Marshall when James married Elizabeth Kyle McCausland (she is related to the Robert Campbell Family of St. Louis through the Kyles). Fairfax was completed the following year. James and Elizabeth had five children who lived to maturity. A son, Ernest, the only to marry and have children, raised two sons.

James Marshall sought to build a church and requested the services of the Presbyterian Church of St. Louis, which sent Rev Artemus Bullard to assist Marshall in 1845. A Presbyterian congregation was established in Rock Hill in March 1845, and met in a log house on Marshall's property while the church was built on land contributed by Marshall for a church. Though there is no written proof, it is assumed by many that slaves built the church using stone quarried from the Marshall farm quarry. Rev. Bullard gave the church the name "Rock Hill Presbyterian Church," presumably after two geographic features in the area, which became the namesake of the area. In 1866 fifteen members separated to found the Webster Groves Presbyterian Church

Marshall served as first postmaster at Fairfax House c. 1845. Marshall died in February 1864. The post office was closed in 1863, only to reopen a year later until 1897, whereupon mail service was moved to Webster Groves.

Mail service was re-established in February 1874.

Rock Hill was a stop near present-day Creve Coeur Drive on the Missouri Pacific spur from Creve Coeur, Missouri to downtown St. Louis. Trains ran twice daily. In 1934 Rock Hill Investment Co. purchased 22.93 acres on the railroad from Rock Hill Supply Co. for an industrial subdivision In 1954 Walter F. Hellmich purchased 15 acres to develop an "Industrial Court." In 1969 Rock Hill notified Missouri Pacific it would condemn its station.

Rock Hill remained largely undeveloped until the 1920s when much of the area was parceled for the construction of houses. In 1940 a 27-acre subdivision was created south of Manchester road. In April 1929 Rock Hill was incorporated as a village. The village switched to a mayor–aldermanic form of government in 1941. In April 1947 the Village of Rock Hill voted to incorporate as a fourth class city.

On 10 February 1959 a powerful tornado struck Rock Hill north of Manchester, destroying Mackle Florist (1913–1965) and continued onward into St. Louis.

In April 1962 the city voted to annex the eastern half of Des Peres Avenue.

The city flag was presented by the Citizens of Rock Hill Improvement Association in May 1965.

In 2006 Rock Hill began transitioning from a residential city to a point-of-sale city with a retail development project on Manchester. With city financial reserves at critical levels, city administrator George Liyeos told the Post-Dispatch "our entire future hinges on the success of that project."

The 30th annual Rock Hill Fall Festival was held in 2013.

== Demographics ==
Historical population
Census	Pop.	Note	%±
1930	1,309		—
1940	1,821		39.1%
1950	3,847		111.3%
1960	6,523		69.6%
1970	6,815		4.5%
1980	5,702		−16.3%
1990	5,217		−8.5%
2000	4,765		−8.7%
2010	4,635		−2.7%
2020	4,750		2.5%
U.S. Decennial Census

=== Racial and ethnic composition ===
Rock Hill city, Missouri – Racial and ethnic composition Note: the US Census treats Hispanic/Latino as an ethnic category. This table excludes Latinos from the racial categories and assigns them to a separate category. Hispanics/Latinos may be of any race.
Race / Ethnicity (NH = Non-Hispanic)	Pop 2000	Pop 2010	Pop 2020	% 2000	% 2010	% 2020
White alone (NH)	3,206	3,188	3,347	67.28%	68.78%	70.46%
Black or African American alone (NH)	1,299	1,062	803	27.26%	22.91%	16.91%
Native American or Alaska Native alone (NH)	8	13	5	0.17%	0.28%	0.11%
Asian alone (NH)	94	115	100	1.97%	2.48%	2.11%
Native Hawaiian or Pacific Islander alone (NH)	1	0	0	0.02%	0.00%	0.00%
Other race alone (NH)	2	8	34	0.04%	0.17%	0.72%
Mixed race or Multiracial (NH)	94	121	283	1.97%	2.61%	5.96%
Hispanic or Latino (any race)	61	128	178	1.28%	2.76%	3.75%
Total	4,765	4,635	4,750	100.00%	100.00%	100.00%

=== 2020 census ===
As of the 2020 census, Rock Hill had a population of 4,750. The median age was 37.2 years. 20.9% of residents were under the age of 18 and 16.0% of residents were 65 years of age or older. For every 100 females there were 93.2 males, and for every 100 females age 18 and over there were 90.1 males age 18 and over.

100.0% of residents lived in urban areas, while 0.0% lived in rural areas.

There were 2,125 households in Rock Hill, of which 27.6% had children under the age of 18 living in them. Of all households, 42.1% were married-couple households, 20.6% were households with a male householder and no spouse or partner present, and 30.5% were households with a female householder and no spouse or partner present. About 34.1% of all households were made up of individuals and 11.4% had someone living alone who was 65 years of age or older.

There were 2,238 housing units, of which 5.0% were vacant. The homeowner vacancy rate was 1.4% and the rental vacancy rate was 7.4%.

=== 2010 census ===
As of the census of 2010, there were 4,635 people, 2,064 households, and 1,198 families residing in the city. The population density was 4,252.3 inhabitants per square mile (1,641.8/km^{2}). There were 2,217 housing units at an average density of 2,033.9 per square mile (785.3/km^{2}). The racial makeup of the city was 70.6% White, 23.0% African American, 0.3% Native American, 2.5% Asian, 0.8% from other races, and 2.9% from two or more races. Hispanic or Latino of any race were 2.8% of the population.

There were 2,064 households, of which 26.6% had children under the age of 18 living with them, 42.3% were married couples living together, 11.8% had a female householder with no husband present, 3.9% had a male householder with no wife present, and 42.0% were non-families. 33.8% of all households were made up of individuals, and 9% had someone living alone who was 65 years of age or older. The average household size was 2.25 and the average family size was 2.93.

The median age in the city was 36.9 years. 20.7% of residents were under the age of 18; 7.1% were between the ages of 18 and 24; 32.9% were from 25 to 44; 26.8% were from 45 to 64; and 12.6% were 65 years of age or older. The gender makeup of the city was 49.0% male and 51.0% female.

== Business ==
Business first developed east of Deer Creek. Windom was the Rock Hill area serviced by railroad east of the river bounded by Brentwood Boulevard and Litzinger Road. Windom stop, later "Mentor", had a post office where mail was delivered weekly. West of Deer Creek a number of dairy and produce farms developed.

In business since 1890, Trainwreck Saloon on Manchester is the oldest continually operated bar in St. Louis County. The Hacienda restaurant building on Manchester Road was the home built by steamboat captain Mils T. Redmon in 1861. In 1951 the house became a restaurant called Chalet De Normandie, owned by the Ledait family, and later Parente's Italian Village. In 1968, it was St. Louis' first full-service Mexican eatery. It was called Oliver's until 1977, when it became Hacienda.

In May 1999 the Board of Alderman selected Sansone Development over Landside Resources for redevelopment of McKnight and Manchester. In October Sansone withdrew from the project. Sansone told Rock Hill later that year it wanted to scale back the development area from 25 acres to 16, just the northwest corner. After the city reopening the bid process Rock Hill agreed in April 2000 to allow Sansone to develop 16 acres, financed by up to $7 million in tax-increment financing. Sansone withdrew its proposal again in September 2000 citing city delays that meant surrounding development projects had progressed so much as to make the 16-acre proposal infeasible. The city re-bid the projects and received 40-acre plans from Regency Realty and THF Realty and an additional 25-acre plan from Regency. In April 2001 both developers retracted their bids amid a firestorm of resident opposition against the proposals.

In 2001 RSI Kitchen & Bath purchased the three-acre former Stivers car dealership property on Manchester for construction of its main showroom. In December 2000 Quebecor World began talks with city officials to acquire the city hall for a potential expansion of the adjacent Sayers Printing Company. In August 2002 Quebecor World Sayers closed its 3.5-acre property.

In January 2004 the Board of Aldermen selected Novus Companies to develop 36.9 acres at the southwest and northwest corners of Manchester and McKnight roads. In March 2005 the Board of Aldermen approved the $95 million mixed-use development, called Market at McKnight. The buy-out area targeted 126 properties on the north corner, and 48 properties, including 15 homes, on the south side. Demolition began in August 2006. In May 2007 Rock Hill sought a second request for proposals when over half of north-side property owners were unsatisfied with Novus' buy-out offers and Novus sought an additional $7 million in tax increment financing (TIF). In December 2007 the Board of Alderman replaced Novus with Miller Weingarten and Hutkin Properties on the northwest redevelopment site and increased the TIF from $18 million to $26.7 million. The south Market at McKnight opened in November 2007. By January 2010 the development area was 60 percent leased. In April 2014 Novus announced its second anchor for the development, 27,000-square-foot Lucky's Market.

In June 2005 the Board of Aldermen approved Mills Properties' request to build an 84-unit apartment complex on 7.7 acres on McKnight Road.

In 2006 Rock Hill joined the Webster Groves/Shrewsberry Area Chamber of Commerce.

In December 2008 Target delayed its plans for a store on the northwest development by nine months, citing the global credit crisis. In March 2009 Target canceled its planned location. Miller Weingarten ended its involvement in May. The 27-acre north development area was reduced to 2.9 acres in October 2010.

== Education ==
Since 1948 Rock Hill has been part of the Webster Groves School District. Three public schools are within the city's borders:

- Hudson Elementary School
- Givens Elementary School (formerly Steger Sixth Grade Center and Computer School)

Rock Hill School District comprised Rock Hill, parts of Ladue, Warson Woods, Kirkwood, Brentwood and Webster Groves; and was one of the first districts formed in St. Louis County. Rock Hill #I on Manchester and Rock Hill Road was established in 1909. In 1911 enrollment was 270. In 1912 two more elementary schools were built. In 1920 Rock Hill #II passed on to Brentwood when the city split from Rock Hill School District to form its own school district. Rock Hill #I was expanded with a three-story addition in 1930, the same year Rock Hill #III was razed. In 1945 ten acres were purchased for construction of a junior high school, later also a senior high school, which is today Hudson Elementary School. It was designed by Ernest J. Friton. In July 1948, voters opted to merge the district with Webster Groves School District. The Webster Groves School Board accepted the merge in September. Enrollment in Rock Hill School District was 435 at the time. Rock Hill superintendent T. Dean Adams was named as principal of Rock Hill's two schools. Rock Hill #I was renamed after long-time Rock Hill school board president Ed Schall. The NAACP sued and won the right for students on the north side of Lithia Avenue to attend Schall after schools were legally integrated in 1956.

In May 1958, Webster Groves School District voters passed a bond issue for the construction of a $1.6 million junior high school in Rock Hill and a second junior high school abutting Webster Groves Senior High School. Steger Junior High, named after Webster Groves Superintendent Leonard Steger, was built in 1960. Steger was converted to an elementary school amid budget cuts in 1978 as part of a district-wide reorganization plan. In 1983 the school district finalized plans to consolidate sixth grade teaching at Steger.

Schall School was rebuilt in 1965, then transferred to Special School District of St. Louis County in 1975. Enrollment was 172. Hudson was closed in 1978 and reopened in 1984 after remodeling. Schall was made a Department of Motor Vehicles office circa 1982.

Rock Hill Preschool

From c. 1974 Rock Hill Preschool operated out of the Parks and Recreation building on North Rock Hill Road. In March 2007 the city eliminated the preschool program as a cost-saving measure. Mayor Morgan voted against the preschool the next month when a second aldermanic vote came down to a tie.

== Parks, recreation and historical landmarks ==
The recreation program was set in motion in 1971 by mayor Lincoln Wagner. In June 1972 mayor Jess Stroup created a citizen parks and recreation commission to build a city park. One of the recreation commission's first acts was to create a summer day camp program for children. By October 1974 the city signed a contract to begin construction of a half-acre park. Dedicated in June 1975, the two-acre park had two tennis courts, two handball courts, two shuffleboard courts and horseshoe pits. In 1976 the city hired Genie Zakrzewski to direct the parks and recreation program. By June 1982, the city had added four more parks:

- Oakhaven Park – Three-acre park on Gilbert & Oakhaven completed in 1977. Two lots for the park were purchased in 1974 and 1975. Built with four tennis courts, a picnic shelter, horseshoe pits and a playground.
- Oak Trail Nature Park – Four-acre park at the end of Oakhaven with 2000 feet of trails. Developed in 1979.
- Stroup Field – On Old Warson and McKinley. The land for this two-and-a-half-acre park was purchased around 1978. It initially included two softball fields and a soccer/football field.
- Greenwood Park – Located between Lithia and Eldridge. Sub-acre park that initially included a basketball court and playground.

The five parks cost $325,000 to build, with three quarters of the amount coming from federal and state programs.

After the Rock Hill Parks and Recreation building was demolished, the tennis courts at Rock Hill park remained until the park was closed and dismantled in 2017.

Two additional parks have also been built:

- Hensley Park – Next to Salem Hills
- Whitfield Park – Berry Road & Madison Avenue

Over half of residents had visited a city park in that last year, according to a 2009 survey commissioned by the city. Seventy-six percent of respondents felt the parks needed improvements. Oakhaven Park was the most used, followed by Stroup Field.

The Rock Hill Presbyterian Church was built by slaves in 1847 at what is now Manchester and McKnight roads. It was the oldest operating Presbyterian church west of the Mississippi River until 2010 when its congregation left. The United African Presbyterian Church congregation occupied the building until 2011 when the Giddings-Lovejoy Presbytery sold the property to a gas station. In July 2011 the Board of Aldermen approved construction under the condition that the gas station owners attempt to rehome the church. In April 2012 Cedar Lake Cellars began moving the church at its own expense to its winery in Foristell, Missouri.

Three time capsules were buried on the church property between 1845 and 1958. The later two (from 1935 and 1958) were recovered and opened in May. The third, its location having never been recorded, was never found.

== Government ==
Since 2003 the city administrator is no longer required to live in Rock Hill. Larry Hensley served as city administrator from 1983 to September 2002. George Liyeos served as city administrator from September 2005 until his resignation in May 2014. The Board of Aldermen appointed Jennifer Yackley as City Administrator in July.

Mayors

- 1929 – 1934, Mils T. Oliver
- 1934 – 1935, Edw. Frauenfelder
- 1935 – 1938, Mils T. Oliver
- 1938 – May 1943, J. W. Cloud
- May 1943 – April 1944, Joseph Spencer
- April 1944 – April 1945, R. W. Keller
- April 1945 – c. 1947, W. E. McDaniel
- April 1947 – May 1953, H. W. Cook (Died in office)
- August 1953 – c. 1956, Clarence Zahnow
- April 1956 – c. 1960, Elmer A. Whitney. Elected in 1956 by write-in ballot.
- April 1960 – April 1964, Edward Gebhardt
- April 1964 – 1971, Lincoln L. Wagner
- September 1971 – 1994, Jesse L. Stroup. Elected in September 1971 following the death of Wagner.
- April 1994 – April 2002, Kennard O. Whitfield President of the Missouri Conference of Black Mayors in 1997.
- April 2002 – August 2004, Robert Salamone (resigned). Defeated incumbent Whitfield under a campaign platform that promised "to save our city from financial ruin." Resigned under a cloud of controversy in 2004. A 2005 state audit discovered Salamone had received a commission in excess of $33,600 from the city's pension firm. Salamone pled guilty and was sentenced to two years probation and ordered to pay restitution in December 2006.
- September 2004 (appointed) – April 2005, Mike Conran. Alderman appointed to replace interim mayor Edith Brown.
- April 2005 – April 2010, Julie Morgan.
- April 2010 – May 2014, Daniel DiPlacido. Defeated incumbent and political rival Morgan on a campaign promising to respect property rights.
- May 2014 – Present, Edward Mahan. Ran unopposed in 2014.

City center

In 1940 voters passed a $11,000 bond issue to build a city hall and fire department headquarters. The project also received a federal grant. The city hall on Rock Hill Road was dedicated in December 1941.

In 1958 the city purchased the Koehler property on Manchester Road for the construction of a new city hall. The city hall housing police, fire station and Rock Hill Library was dedicated in May 1965.

By 1996 the city said city hall was overcrowded and planned to relocate to Stroup Field, on the southeast corner of McKinley Avenue and Old Warson Road. Later that year, however, voters defeated a parks and drainage sales tax intended to help finance the move.

Rock Hill then proposed remodeling city hall. By September 1999 proposed remodeling costs grew from $1.15 million to nearly $1.68 million.

City hall expansion plans were suspended in December 2000 when Quebecor World began talks with city officials to acquire the city hall property for a potential expansion of Sayers Printing Company. Talks soon fell apart and in April the city resumed planning for an expanded city center. In August 2002 Quebecor World Sayers closed its 3.5-acre property.

Sayers' property was one of three options being considered for city hall's expansion in October 2002. In December Gerber selected the former Gerber site on McKnight Road for the $5.2 million project. In November 2003 the Board of Aldermen purchased the former Gerber property on McKnight Road for $1.75 million. The city planned to build a $13 million, 83,000 square-foot city center complete with an indoor pool, library, full gymnasium, and banquet facility that doubled as meeting space.

In May 2004 Rock Hill Chief Financial Officer Don Cary said overspending put the city on track for bankruptcy by 2010. In June 2004 Mayor Robert Salamone abruptly announced his resignation effective in August, citing "individuals who seek to impede or even halt our efforts at improving our city." In October 2004 the city scaled back its plans for the McKnight site to administrative offices and a police station. The city sold the site to Mills Properties for $1.950 million in February 2005. A state audit in September 2005 said the city lost some $700,000 on the property.

City Hall moved into temporary retail space on Manchester in August 2005, then anticipated to be a temporary move lasting less than two years. In September it sold its former city hall to Novice Companies for $3.67 million. Also that year Rock Hill purchased five homes on North Rock Hill Road for construction of a permanent city hall. However, in March 2006 the city suspended its plans when it determined it was well short of the funds necessary to complete the project. In 2008 Rock Hill sold the property to Arco National Construction Company for construction of the company's corporate headquarters. In August 2011 city hall moved to Thornton.

In April 2016 voters approved a property tax rate increase to allow the city to issue $6.1 million in general obligation bonds. In March 2017 the Board of Aldermen approved planning for a proposed municipal center — a 12,100-square-foot city hall and police and fire department — on Rock Hill Road. In May the city awarded a $5.5 million construction contract to K&S Associates. Ceremonial ground breaking took place in June, with completion planned for late summer or early fall 2018.

Rock Hill Public Library

The original library was opened in June 1944 on the second floor of the Fairfax House. The volunteer-run library was supported by donations and open two days a week. It was later moved to the first floor of Fairfax House. In 1947 the city voted to support the library with taxes after the library weathered a brief closure the previous year.

In 1957 Rock Hill Public Library moved into the former Lions Club building on Manchester Road. From 1963 to 1964 the library was temporarily relocated in the Rock Hill Presbyterian Church while the Manchester location was razed to construct a new city hall and library. The new library was dedicated in May 1965.

Kelley Sallade served as director of Rock Hill Public Library from December 1984 to March 2014. During her tenure the library acquired its first computers for patrons. In 1996 the library joined seven other county libraries to form the Municipal Library Consortium.

In July 2005 the library's 2,400-square-foot location at city hall was closed and later razed for the Market at McKnight development. In January 2006 the library reopened at a temporary 3,696-square foot space on Manchester Road. In 2012 the library moved to a permanent 4456-square foot space at 9811 Manchester Road.

=== Police and fire ===
In 2004 mayor Robert Salamone approached the city of Brentwood about a possible takeover of Rock Hill police and fire services. The proposal was unpopular with Rock Hill residents. In July the Board of Aldermen voted unanimously to keep police and fire services local. The Board of Aldermen also passed resolutions consolidating some police and fire positions under a safety administrator position.

Police and fire moved to a residential property on Charleville Avenue when city hall on Manchester Road was razed in 2005.

In June 2018 the Board of Aldermen voted to transfer administration of the city's uniformed employee pension plan to the Missouri Local Government Employees Retirement System.

Rock Hill Police Department

Roger Stephens was the village's first police officer, who was later served as Chief for 13 years. During Stephens' tenure the city purchased its first police motor car, a 1933 Ford V8. Marshall Whitecotton was appointed police chief c. 1944, then elected to eight additional two-year terms until his death in August 1966. Under Whitecotton, Brentwood cooperated with Rock Hill's motorized six-man department, which by then had two-way radios.

Bradford Epperson served as police chief from 1966 until his death in April 1978. He was President of the Missouri Police Chiefs Association in 1975.

In 1973 Rock Hill voters made police chief an appointive position, having defeated a similar effort in 1966. After Chief James Johnstone retired, a police committee recommended promoting acting police chief Mark Zimmer for the permanent position but the recommendation was rejected by aldermen. Northwoods police chief Donald McDonald was appointed Rock Hill police chief in June 1983. Under his leadership Rock Hill became known for its aggressive enforcement of speed limits. He retired in June 1997. A 2000 Missouri study on racial profiling at traffic stops indicated Rock Hill pulled over significantly fewer black drivers than the county. Over four months black drivers made up 10.6 percent of 1,499 police stops.

Between 1983 and 2009 Officer Ronald Zeigler issued an estimated 150,000 tickets, mostly to speeding drivers. He was Missouri City Traffic Officer of the Year in 1985, Rock Hill Officer of the Year five times, and the 2000 Traffic Officer of the Millennium. Zeigler retired in October 2009. He "put the city on the regional map as a place where speeding motorists could expect to pay for their ignorance of speed limits," according to the Webster-Kirkwood Times. In 2011 Ziegler returned part-time.

In 2007 Rock Hill Police opened a substation inside a bank on Manchester Road.

Paul Arnett became police chief circa 2006. Previously he had served with the department for nearly 30 years. The Webster-Kirkwood Times, which published Arnett's crime dispatches (one of which appeared on David Letterman) wrote that "writing a good crime report is hard. Almost as hard as doing police work. And Chief Arnett appears to have mastered both." Arnett retired in March 2013.

In April 2010 officer Matt Crosby was shot and paralyzed when he responded to a domestic disturbance call on Raritan Drive. The shooter received a life sentence with possibility for parole in September 2012.

Rock Hill Fire Department

In October 1940 Rock Hill residents voted in favor of a bond issue creating a city fire service after a long-standing contract with Maplewood fire services ended. The fire station and city hall building was dedicated in December 1941.

John Kriska was fire chief circa 1990. He became safety administrator in 2004.

In 2006 the fire department received a record 932 calls. Current fire chief Kevin Halloran became chief c. 2008.

In 2008 the city received a $237,000 grant from the Federal Emergency Management Agency for a new fire truck. Fire house offices moved from the Charleville Firehouse to City Hall on Thornton Avenue while a fire engine and ambulance continued to operate out of the Charleville. CVS Pharmacy asked for $1.5 million TIF on the city's behalf to build a new firehouse to replace the old, which would be demolished to build CVS. In January 2013 the city TIF commission recommended against using TIF to finance the fire department's move. In April 2013 the Board of Alderman left the fire department out of the $1.2 million TIF, instead splitting the amount three ways between CVS, Webster Groves School District and the city.

In August 2016 Rock Hill agreed to explore consolidating its fire command with Clayton, Maplewood, Brentwood and Richmond Heights, however in September 2017 Rock Hill left the agreement after studies suggested the joint command would cost the city more than double its fire department budget.

August 21, 2018, was the grand opening of Rock Hill's new city hall, police and fire departments at 827 N. Rock Hill Road.

== Civics groups ==
Rock Hill Improvement Association

The Rock Hill Improvement Association was formed in 1938 to serve the "best interests" of the school district and city. In 1940 the association advocated for the creation of the fire department. In 1943 the association paid for the renovation of the second floor of the Fairfax House to house the library. The association met here weekly. Circa 1944 the Ladies Auxiliary of Rock Hill Improvement Association was established.

Interested Citizens of Rock Hill Improvement Association

The Interested Citizens association was formed by black Rock Hill residents in October 1963. The group litigated against commercial rezoning of neighborhoods. The association presented the city's flag design in 1965.
