= Hi-Fi Fo-Fum =

Large signs atop the building of the Hi-Fi Fo-Fum logo mascot "Hideton Finster Forbush Fum" have been a St.Louis landmark for decades

Hi-Fi Fo-Fum was an American audio equipment store that was founded in 1955 by Ron Bliffert. The flagship store was located in Richmond Heights, an inner suburb of St. Louis, Missouri, and was in operation from the company's inception until 2011. A second store was opened in Milwaukee, Wisconsin in the late 1960s, though it closed before the original location. The store was noted for carrying a wide variety of high-end audio and video equipment, as well as its sideline in installing sound systems for mobile vehicles and home theaters. Attempts by former manager Tony Dollar to keep the business intact after Bliffert's death were unsuccessful, and the retail store was liquidated by Bliffert's daughter.
