= Ferguson Municipal Public Library =

Public library in Ferguson, Missouri, USA

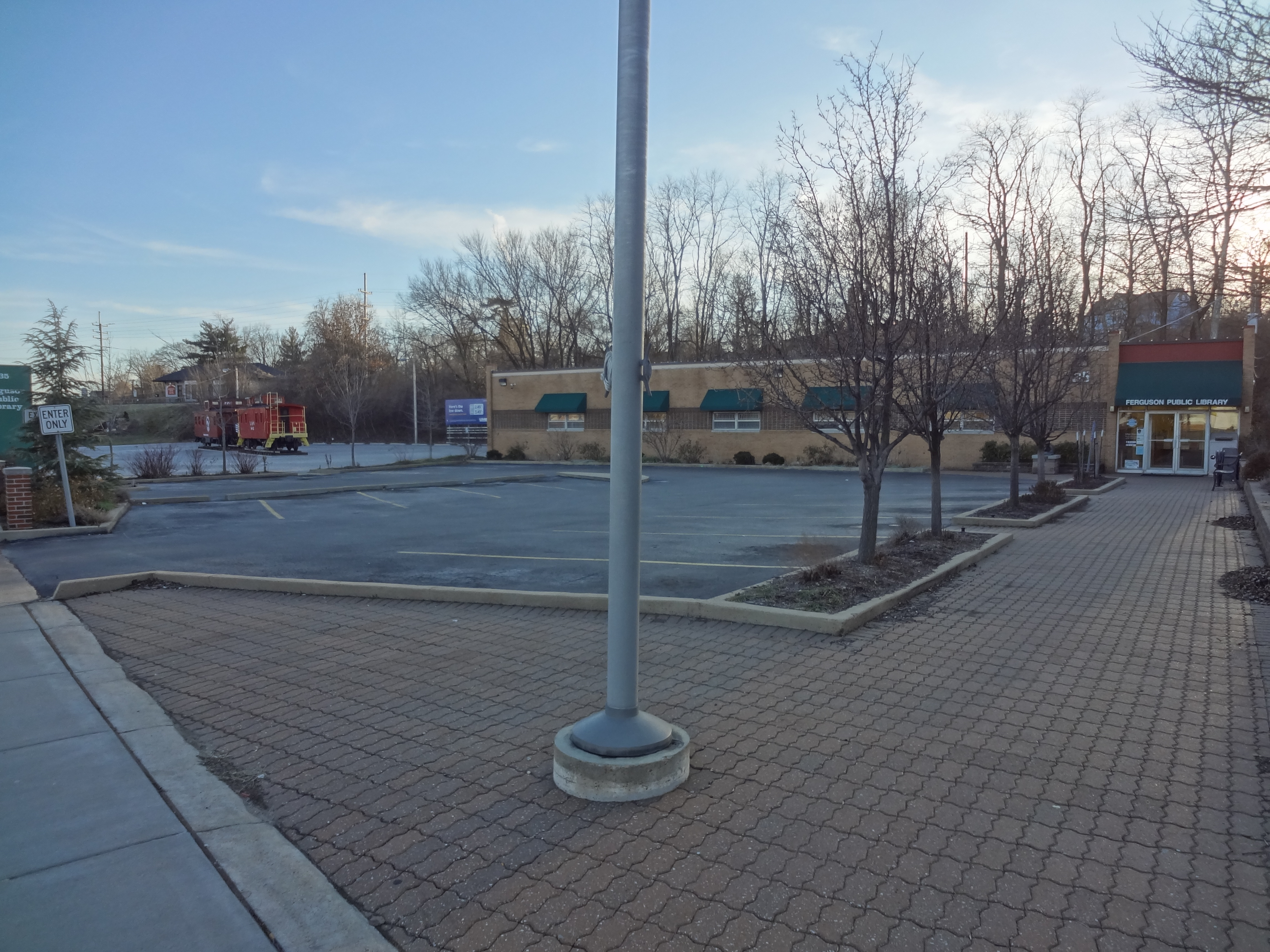
- Exterior of Ferguson Municipal Public Library, January 2012
- 38°44′44″N 90°18′22″W
- Location: Ferguson, Missouri
- Established: June 1930

Collection
- Size: 81,873 items (2014)

Access and use
- Population served: 21,538

Other information
- Budget: $400,000 (2014)
- Director: Scott Bonner
- Employees: 4 full-time employees
- Website: www.ferguson.lib.mo.us

Ferguson Municipal Public Library is an American public library located in Ferguson, Missouri. It is a member of the Municipal Library Consortium of St. Louis County.

== History ==
The Ferguson Municipal Public Library was founded in June 1930 as a volunteer community library. The Missouri Library Commission contacted Chapter FH of the P.E.O. Sisterhood about starting a public library in Ferguson and the Kirkwood Public Library provided guidance and gifted fifty books. The library opened on June 1, 1930, at the corner of Carson and Florissant Road with 575 books in its collection. Between 1930 and 1995, the library moved several times before securing a single-use building. In 1966, Ferguson Municipal Public Library joined the Municipal Library Consortium of St. Louis County (MLC). In 2015 the library was named by the Library Journal as the Gale Cengage/LJ Library of the Year.

== Services ==
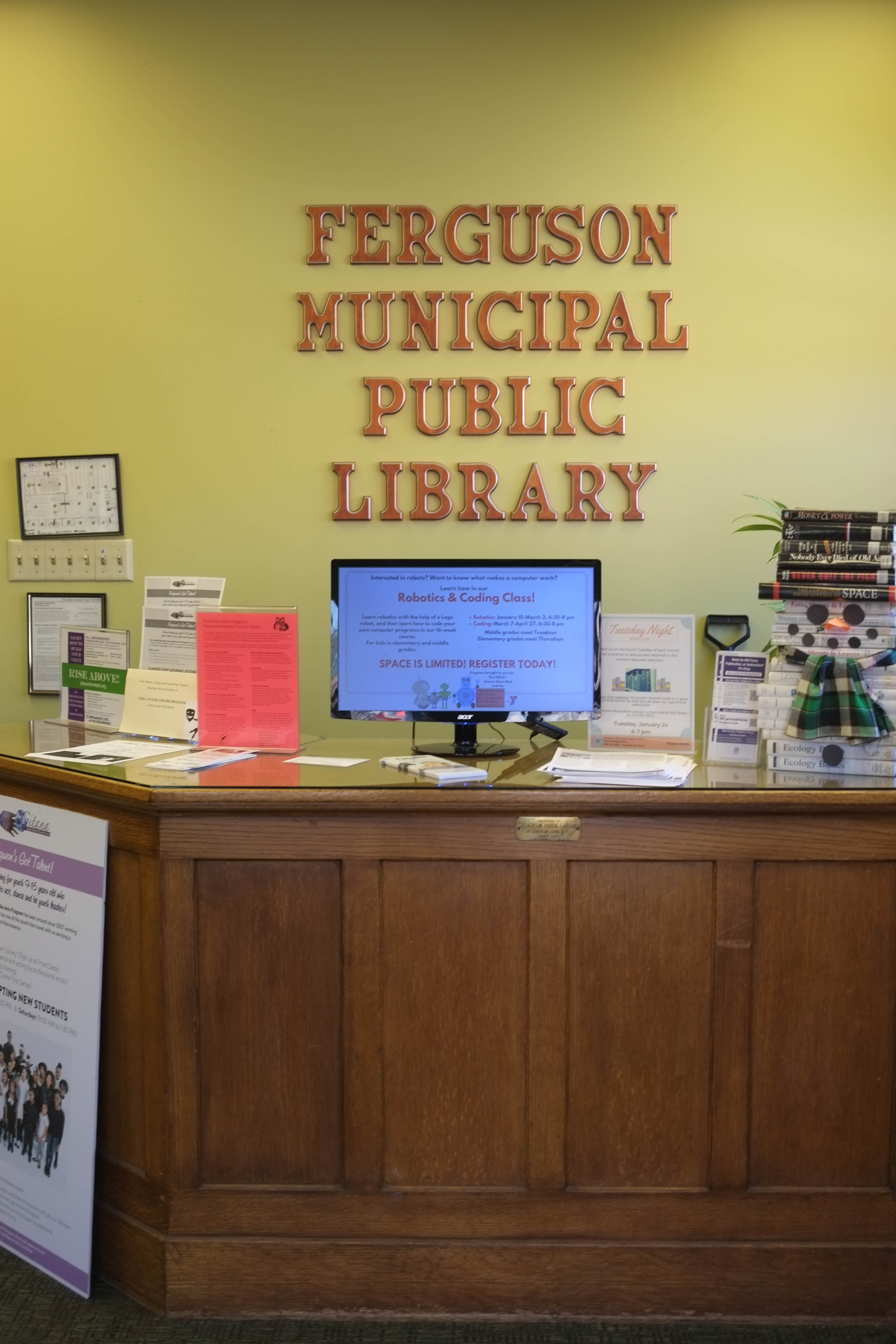
Inside the library, January 2017

Ferguson Municipal Public Library serves a population of 21,538 people. It has a collection of 77,317 volumes and circulation of 70,421 transactions. In addition, library patrons have access to more than 700,000 volumes located at the eight other libraries in the MLC. The Online Public Access Catalog is SirsiDynix Horizon. The library's catalog includes periodicals, special print and digital collections, movies, digital publications, access to ebooks and periodicals on the Internet. Their services include: WiFi and computer workstations, Chromebooks, interlibrary loans, events for children and adults, tax assistance for low income residents, voter registration and public meeting rooms.

=== Support services after Michael Brown shooting ===
The library has often been used as a meeting place for community resources, leaders, and business owners. It received national attention beginning in August 2014 for its efforts to support the local community in the wake of the shooting of Michael Brown. These efforts included helping teachers open an ad hoc school on library grounds in August and November 2014 when schools of the Ferguson-Florissant School District closed due to safety concerns.

Other support services included hosting the U.S. Small Business Administration to provide emergency loans and the office of the U.S. Secretary of State to provide document recovery and preservation of vital documents that were destroyed. The library also hosted the Missouri Department of Insurance to help local businesses file for insurance and held community meetings led by ONUS, Inc., the NAACP and Teach for America. The Alliance of Black Art Galleries selected the library to feature an art display in response to Brown's death and the related unrest. The library offered healing kits for local children that contain books and activities related to coping with traumatic events as well as a stuffed animal for the child to keep.

The library received over $350,000 in donations in the weeks following the grand jury decision not to indict the police officer involved in the shooting death of Michael Brown — approximately 85% of its annual budget.

== Administration ==
The library is independent and has its own tax levy. It is governed by a Library Board of Trustees composed of volunteers appointed by the Mayor of Ferguson. In 2014, the director, Scott Bonner, was the only full-time staffperson.

== See also ==
- Education in Greater St. Louis
- St. Louis County Library
- St. Louis County Law Library
- St. Louis Community College-Florissant Valley
