= List of killings by law enforcement officers in the United States, September 2012 =

This is a list of people reported killed by non-military law enforcement officers in the United States in September 2012, whether in the line of duty or not, and regardless of reason or method. The listing documents the occurrence of a death, making no implications regarding wrongdoing or justification on the part of the person killed or officer involved. Killings are arranged by date of the incident that caused death. Different death dates, if known, are noted in the description. The table below lists 67 people.

== September 2012 ==
Date	Name (Age) of Deceased	State (City)	Description
2012‑09‑30	Arnold, Eugene Leroy, Jr. (36)	Texas (Shamrock)	Arnold fled from police in Oklahoma and crossed into Texas. The vehicle chase ended when Arnold crashed into a field. A struggle ensued between Arnold and a Texas DPS officer. During the struggle, Arnold was fatally wounded by a gunshot.
2012-09-29	Buquet, Christian Nicholas (19)	Idaho (Coeur d'Alene)	Buquet was leading the police on a high speed chase after he had shot someone. Buquet lost control of his vehicle and spun out. Buquet then exited the vehicle and fired at officers. The officers returned fire, fatally striking Buquet.
2012-09-29	Wycoff, Stephen Robert (39)	Maryland (California)	Wycoff got into a violent struggle with an officer that was responding to a disturbance call. During the struggle, the officer fatally shot Wycoff.
2012-09-28	Alvarado, Valeria (32)	California (Chula Vista)	Alvarado allegedly struck a plainclothes Border Patrol agent with her car. The agent was allegedly on the hood of the car when he shot Alvarado.
2012-09-28	Davis Jr., Alton (32)	Louisiana (Henderson)	Deputies were approaching a vehicle in which Davis was behind the wheel. Davis put the vehicle into reverse and struck one of the officers. The officers fired at the vehicle, fatally wounding Davis.
2012-09-28	Helvik, Thomas (41)	Louisiana (Lafayette)	Helvik was being pursued following a bank robbery. Helvik drove his truck through a field and struck a fence. He was then shot and killed by a pursuing officer.
2012-09-27	Brown, Earl (73)	Florida (Lauderhill)	Officers responded to report of an intruder at a recycling center. When they saw Brown with a weapon, they fired multiple times. Brown was a security guard who had worked at the center for 35 years, but was not wearing a uniform. Brown died in the hospital on October 12, 2012.
2012-09-27	Mayhew, Anthony (37)	Utah (Salt Lake City)	Mayhew was in a 2-hour standoff with police that started with a bomb scare at a downtown bus station. Mayhew was fatally shot when he allegedly stopped listening to the officers commands and started to approach them.
2012-09-27	Rodriguez Jr., Jose (14)	California (Santa Ana)	Rodriguez allegedly called 9-1-1 to report a man with a gun outside of his house. When officers arrived at the scene, they found Rodriguez standing by the road armed with a shotgun. Rodriguez ignored orders to drop the weapon. Officers fatally shot Rodriguez when he allegedly pointed the weapon at them.
2012-09-26	Murray, Dennis Ray Jr	Texas (Beaumont)	Officers identified and pursued Murray regarding allegations of sexual assault. Murray fled to his home, retrieved a rifle and shot at officers. During a struggle for the rifle, officers fatally shot Murray.
2012-09-26	Worley, Kevin (25)	Missouri (Rock Hill)	Worley was a suspect in recent home invasions. An officer spotted him sitting in a car at a gas station. When the officer approached and ordered Worley to show his hands, Worley pulled out a gun. Worley was fatally shot when he allegedly pointed the weapon at the officer.
2012-09-25	Bah, Mohamed (28)	New York (New York)	Bah was fatally shot by three officers as he was stabbing a fourth officer. Police were at Bah's apartment after receiving a call from his mother. Bah's mother was worried that her son might hurt himself or someone else. Police used a taser and rubber bullet prior to using their regular firearms.
2012-09-25	Paladino, Maurice Chad (42)	Texas (Austin)	Paladino stole an SUV from a car dealership earlier in the day. When police found the vehicle in a hotel parking lot, they attempted to arrest Paladino. Paladino got in the vehicle and allegedly drove at an officer. The officer shot Paladino, who died the following day from his wounds.
2012-09-24	Thompson, Justin (15)	Tennessee (Memphis)	The teenager was shot and killed by off-duty police officer Terrance Shaw. Police say Thompson had attempted to rob Shaw.
2012-09-24	Alvarez, Edgar (24)	California (Hayward)	Police were searching for the suspect in an earlier shooting at a bar. When police attempted to stop a vehicle for questioning, the driver put the car in reverse and drove at the officers. The officers then fatally shot the driver.
2012-09-23	Lopez, Joshua Michael (22)	Maryland (Dundalk)	Officers were talking to the man after calls about a suspicious person in the area. The suspect allegedly went for the officer's gun. A second officer then fatally shot him.
2012-09-23	Lee, Henry, Sr. (77)	Washington (Seattle)	The man used a medical alert system to request help because of a suspicious activity in the area. When officers arrived at his house, he came outside with a gun. Two of the officers shot him when he allegedly raised the weapon towards them.
2012-09-22	Barnes, Samuel William (49)	Arizona (Phoenix)	Officers were responding to a domestic dispute call when they encountered Barnes pointing an AK-47 at his wife. Officers shot him when he refused to lower the weapon. After being hit, Barnes pointed the weapon towards one of the officers, and the officer fired a second time. Barnes died later at the hospital.
2012-09-22	McDonnell, Patrick (51)	Wisconsin (Eau Galle)	Police were called to house of a man said to be suicidal and armed. The man came out of the house with three weapons. He fired at least two shots at officers, striking one of their patrol cars. The officers then returned fire, fatally hitting the suspect.
2012-09-22	Storey, Paul Lawson (35)	California (Roseville)	Suspect was fleeing from the scene of a domestic dispute. When an officer caught him and attempted to arrest him, a struggle ensued. A second officer, fearing for the safety of the other officer, fatally shot the suspect.
2012-09-22	Claunch, Brian	Texas (Houston)	Police responded to report of a combative resident with a history of schizophrenia at a personal care home. Claunch, a double-amputee, cornered an officer with his wheelchair and threatened to stab the officer with a pen. A second officer feared for the first officer's safety and fatally shot Claunch.
2012-09-22	unnamed male (30s)	Florida (Hollywood)	Officers responded to a report of a man peering into windows of homes. When questioned the suspect became confrontational and was fatally shot.
2012-09-21	Anderson, Anthony (46)	Maryland (Baltimore)	Anderson was arrested by two plainclothes officers on a narcotics charge. Witnesses claim that the officers used excessive force. Anderson died of his injuries while in police custody.
2012-09-21	Kelly, Jeremiah (31)	Florida (Hollywood)	Kelly was caught burglarizing a home, and was fatally shot when he allegedly charged at officers
2012-09-21	Ziniewicz, Atom (34)	Alaska (Healy)	Officers were searching a wooded area for Ziniewicz in connection with an earlier shooting. During the manhunt, Ziniewicz was fatally shot.
2012-09-21	Watson, Steven L	Illinois (Riverdale, Chicago)	Officers responded to a report of a man firing a gun. Watson pointed a gun at officers after being told to drop it. He was shot multiple times and pronounced dead at a local hospital.
2012-09-20	Hill, Tyjuan (22)	New York (New York)	An officer pulled the suspect's car over. When the car came to a stop, the driver got out and ran on foot. When the officer caught up to him, the two men struggled. At one point the officer fired his gun, fatally striking the man in the head.
2012-09-20	Ferguson, Danny David (60)	North Carolina (High Point)	Police responding to a report of a stabbing at an apartment building found Ferguson in the lobby, armed with a knife. Two officers shot at him, killing him, after he allegedly refused commands to drop the knife and came towards them.
2012-09-20	Marquez, Samuel Jason (44)	New Mexico (South Valley)	Police were called when Marquez arrived at his mother's house and began arguing with her. She had a restraining order against him. Police say that when officers arrived, Marquez walked outside with a knife to his mother's throat. Officers shot and killed Marquez when he allegedly turned back toward the house and tried to take her with him.
2012-09-19	Towler, Delma (83)	Virginia (Altavista)	Police were investigating a 9-1-1 call and hang up. While the officers were trying to communicate with anyone in the house, a shot was fired from within. Delma then exited the house with a gun in her hand and walked towards another house. Officers ordered her to drop the weapon. Delma then allegedly pointed it towards the officers, one of whom then fatally shot her.
2012-09-19	Hannowsky, Christopher Lee (31)	California (Vista)	A gang-enforcement officer confronted the man because he appeared to be holding a knife. The two men got into a struggle. During the struggle the suspect allegedly took control of the officer's taser. The officer then drew his firearm, and fatally shot the man.
2012-09-19	Monge, Elias (22)	California (Fresno)	Police were responding to a call about an individual firing a shotgun in their front yard. Six officers responded and talked with the suspect for about 10 minutes, while waiting for a crisis negotiator to arrive. Before the negotiator got there, the suspect allegedly pointed the weapon towards one of the officers. All six officers at the scene fired their weapons, fatally striking the suspect.
2012-09-19	Domagala, Thomas Lars (27)	Nevada (North Las Vegas)	The suspect was being tracked by a mult-agency fugitive task force. During a vehicle pursuit, the car he was a passenger in struck another vehicle. The suspect got out and ran on foot. When the suspect allegedly made a motion as if going for a weapon, one of the pursuing officers fatally shot him.
2012-09-18	Stowell Jr., Gerald Arthur (50)	Oregon (The Dalles)	Police were at the house after a reported rape occurred. After some officers left the house to take the victim to the hospital, the suspect entered a bathroom and allegedly came out with a large knife. Two officers shot him after he refused to drop the weapon.
2012-09-18	Bunnell, Jason T (32)	New Jersey (Burlington)	An officer approached a suspicious person near a car dealership. The person fled on foot, then fired at the officer. The officer returned fire, killing the suspect.
2012-09-17	unnamed male (27)	California (Paramount)	The suspect got into a fight with a deputy responding to family dispute call. After hitting the officer in the head and attempting to choke him, the suspect allegedly went for the officer's pistol. At that point the officer fatally shot the suspect.
2012-09-16	Lucas, Jermaine (29)	Nebraska (Omaha)	Lucas was on a 48-hour furlough from a correctional facility when he was shot and killed by officers. The officers were investigating gunshots when they spotted Lucas running down the street towards them. They ordered him to lay down on the ground. Lucas allegedly went for his weapon, and the two officers fired.
2012-09-15	Castillo-Romero, Johnny (23)	Arizona (Tucson)	An officer responding to a call about a man with a gun spotted Romero, and ordered him to show his hands. Romero, who was in a wheelchair, allegedly turned and pointed a weapon at the officer, who then fatally shot him.
2012-09-14	McCall, Clay Crawford (26)	North Carolina (Charlotte)	Officers were responding to a domestic dispute call. McCall's grandmother had locked herself inside her home because of McCall's behavior. As officers approached McCall, he allegedly picked up some shears and aggressively moved towards the officers. One officer used a taser, and the second officer fired 2 rounds from his gun. McCall was pronounced dead at the hospital.
2012-09-14	McGowan, Christopher (22)	Illinois (Chicago)	Officers responded to report of two or three armed men arriving uninvited to a large block party. When officers arrived the men fled. While being chased, the men pointed their guns at officers. One suspect was shot and killed.
2012-09-14	Schuck, Daniel (47)	Texas (San Antonio)	Police were responding to a disturbance call at a hotel. Upon entering the room, the suspect allegedly fired at officers, both of whom returned fire. The suspect was pronounced dead at the scene.
2012-09-13	Idakoji, Labaran (26)	Texas (Houston)	Officers were arriving at a scene of multiple stabbings. The suspect then allegedly attempted to attack an officer. That officer shot the suspect. When the suspect continued to advance towards the officer, a second officer fired at the suspect, fatally wounding him.
2012-09-13	Shirrel, Dustin Lee (30)	Oklahoma (Pryor)	Police attempted to pull over a vehicle that Shirrel was a passenger in, because it appeared to be stolen. The driver fled, and after five miles crashed the car. Shirrel ran on foot into nearby woods. The driver surrendered, and told the officers that Shirrel was armed. Later he stepped out of the woods and allegedly brandished a handgun. Officers from three different agencies opened fire, killing Shirrel.
2012-09-12	Burns, James (53)	Pennsylvania (Erie)	Two bicycle cops spotted an armed individual. When police made contact and ordered him to drop his weapon, he allegedly pointed it at one of the officers. The officer responding by firing 2 shots, fatally striking the suspect in the head.
2012-09-12	Le, Victor Charles (20)	Georgia (Lilburn)	Family members called the police because their son was threatening to commit robbery. When an officer approached the house the man came outside. After a conversation with the officer, Le allegedly pointed a BB gun at the officer, who fired one shot. Le was fatally wounded.
2012-09-11	Jordan, David (20)	California (Long Beach)	Police say they were responding to a call about an armed man saying he wanted the police to end his life. Jordan's grandmother, the 911 caller, says she called to ask for an ambulance and informed the dispatcher that Jordan had autism. Police shot at Jordan multiple times when he allegedly lunged at them with what family members say was a steak knife.
2012-09-09	Cundy, Jerome George "Jerry" (53)	Georgia (Marietta)	Police began pursuing a vehicle that matched a description from an armed robbery after it refused a traffic stop. Officers eventually executed a PIT maneuver on the vehicle, and the driver allegedly got out and pointed a gun at officers, who shot the man to death.
2012-09-08	Wallace, Carleton J. (30)	Arkansas (Alexander)	An officer allegedly spotted Wallace walking with a pistol in the waist of his pants. Police say Wallace threw the weapon down along the road, and that an officer was searching him when her pistol reportedly discharged by accident, killing him.
2012-09-07	Cuevas, Reynaldo (20)	New York (New York)	Police responded to a burglary at a deli when a customer called 911. The burglary suspects attempted to flee through the back when police arrived. Cuevas, an employee, emerged from the front of the deli behind his manager and ran into a police officer, who fatally shot him. Police say they "believe it was an accidental discharge."
2012-09-07	Sanchez-Escoto, Alejandro (29)	Nevada (Las Vegas)	Chased by Nevada Highway Patrol troopers attempting to stop him from walking on the highway. Fell from overpass. May have fled because he feared deportation.
2012-09-07	Wright, Rasheen Rahan (31)	Georgia (Cochran)	Wright resisted arrest and was shocked with a Taser. Wright then pulled a gun and aimed it at the officer with the Taser. A second officer shot Wright who died of a single gunshot wound.
2012-09-06	Prieto, Eduardo (32)	Florida (Hallandale Beach)	Officers were responding to an armed robbery of a Walmart and followed the suspect's vehicle to a restaurant about three miles away. Three officers "perceived a threat" and fired on Prieto, killing him.
2012-09-06	Martinez, Donna Lynn (39)	Colorado (Lakewood)	Officers pulled over an SUV whose plates checked as stolen, and the two officers approached the vehicle from either side. According to police, the passenger became combative and the officer used a Taser on the man. The female driver began to drive away, and the other officer shot her, killing her. Police say that officer's arm was trapped in the vehicle; he had allegedly tried to remove the keys with his left hand, and then used his right hand to shoot her.
2012-09-05	Williams, Omarri (17)	Florida (Orlando)	Three officers shot and killed Williams when he allegedly pointed a gun at them after shooting two other people. Officers were responding to an armed robbery call.
2012-09-05	Gover, Edward S. (47)	Washington (Spokane)	Gover was shot 6 times by officers who confronted him in his girlfriend's backyard, believing him to be armed. Gover allegedly told the officers he had a knife, but only a set of keys was found by his body. Police had begun pursuing him after receiving a domestic assault report.
2012-09-05	Sweatman, James Jr.	Georgia (Atlanta)	Police responded to a car break-in call and an officer got into a struggle with a man, who he shot to death. Police say they recovered a gun and a screwdriver at the scene.
2012-09-04	Lacy, Christopher Boone (36)	California (Walnut Creek)	Lacy was pulled over by a California Highway Patrol officer. Lacy shot and fatally wounded the officer. Another officer approached the vehicle from the passenger side and fatally shot the suspect. Lacy died later that day in the hospital. Officer Kenyon M. Youngstrom, 37, died from his wounds on September 5, 2012.
2012-09-04	Pineda, Mark (21)	Texas (San Antonio)	An off-duty police officer shot and killed a man who allegedly broke his kitchen window and entered his apartment. The officer shot the man in the head.
2012-09-03	Pedroza, Guillermo Arevalo (36)	Mexico (Nuevo Laredo)	US Border Patrol agents were attempting to apprehend someone who was trying to illegally swim across the Rio Grande. People picnicking on the Mexican side began verbally heckling the agents. The agents claim rocks were thrown at them, which witnesses deny. Agents shot Pedroza twice, killing him.
2012-09-03	Rivera, Jovan (26)	California (Azusa)	Shot while running from an officer. Officer was chasing the suspect after being alerted to an attempted robbery of an adult store. The officer believed that Rivera was armed due to information from the store clerk, it was later determined that he was unarmed.
2012-09-02	Romero, Mario (23)	California (Vallejo)	Romero and his brother-in-law, Joseph Johnson, were approached by officers for questioning regarding a recent gang-related shooting. Romero and Johnson were both shot after Romero allegedly went for a gun in his waistband. Romero died from his wounds. It was later discovered that the weapon was a pellet gun.
2012-09-02	Endrizzi, Robert Edward (60)	Washington (Arlington)	SWAT team was responding to calls about an individual shooting at people and vehicles. SWAT team came under fire and returned fire. Suspected was fatally wounded in shootout with officers.
2012-09-01	Chabot, Denis John (38)	Texas (Houston)	Officers responded to report of a disturbance at a motel. Officers arrived to find Chabot running on a freeway. Officers attempted to protect him by blocking traffic, but he continued to run. Chabot was then stunned with a Taser. Chabot was pronounced dead at a hospital.
2012-09-01	Rosario, Salvador	New Jersey (Paterson)	Police shot Rosario after he allegedly made a move toward them with a hammer. Officers had ordered him to drop the hammer in English, but Rosario only spoke Spanish.
2012-09-01	Plato-Jacobo, Daniel (47)	New Jersey (North Bergen)	Plato-Jacobo had threatened to stab people with broken glass. Plato-Jacobo then went into his apartment and retrieved a kitchen knife. He was fatally shot after refusing to drop the knife.
2012-09-01	Zelaya, Elder Josue (18)	Georgia (Atlanta)	Zelaya opened fire in a bar wounding 4 patrons. An off-duty officer who was working security called for back-up. When a uniformed on-duty officer arrived, they engaged Zelaya. Zelaya ended up fatally wounded.
2012-09-01	Dunton, Anthony (45)	California (San Diego)	Was shot and killed in hospital after swinging a chain and charging at deputies guarding him, police say. He was about to undergo a CT scan after an earlier incident in the downtown jail, where he was "subdued" by several deputies who used a Taser at least once after he allegedly attacked them.

== Known erroneous reports ==
This section includes deaths which were initially reported as police killings but later turned out not to be.

Date	Name	State (City)	Initial Reports	Later Reports
2012‑09‑13	Thomas, Andrew Charles (44)	Pennsylvania (Plymouth Township)	Suspect allegedly shot and killed an officer after being pulled over for a hit-and-run. Later he was shot and taken into custody, he died from his wounds.	Thomas was running from a hit-and-run accident. He ambushed and killed a police officer. Thomas later turned the gun on himself, and died from 2 self-inflicted gunshots.

== See also ==
- Death in custody § United States
- Henry A. Wallace Police Crime Public Database
- List of cases of police brutality
- List of countries with annual rates and counts for killings by law enforcement officers
- List of law enforcement officers killed in the line of duty in the United States
- List of law enforcement officers convicted for an on-duty killing in the United States
- List of shootings by US immigration agents
- List of police reforms related to the George Floyd protests
- List of unarmed African Americans killed by law enforcement officers in the United States
- Lists of killings by law enforcement officers
- Police brutality in the United States
- Police misconduct § United States
- Police riot § United States
- Police use of deadly force in the United States
