= Maplewood Richmond Heights High School =

Public high school in Maplewood, Missouri, US

Location
- 7539 Manchester Road; Maplewood, Missouri 63143; United States; 38°36′51″N 90°19′27″W

Information
- Type: Public high school
- Established: 1929; 97 years ago
- School district: Maplewood Richmond Heights School District
- NCES District ID: 292001001067
- Staff: 32.80 (on an FTE basis)
- Grades: 9–12
- Gender: Co-educational
- Enrollment: 431 (2023–24)
- Student to teacher ratio: 13.14
- Colors: Blue and white
- Athletics conference: South Central Athletic Association
- Nickname: Blue Devils
- Website: mrhschools.net/schools/mrh-high-school

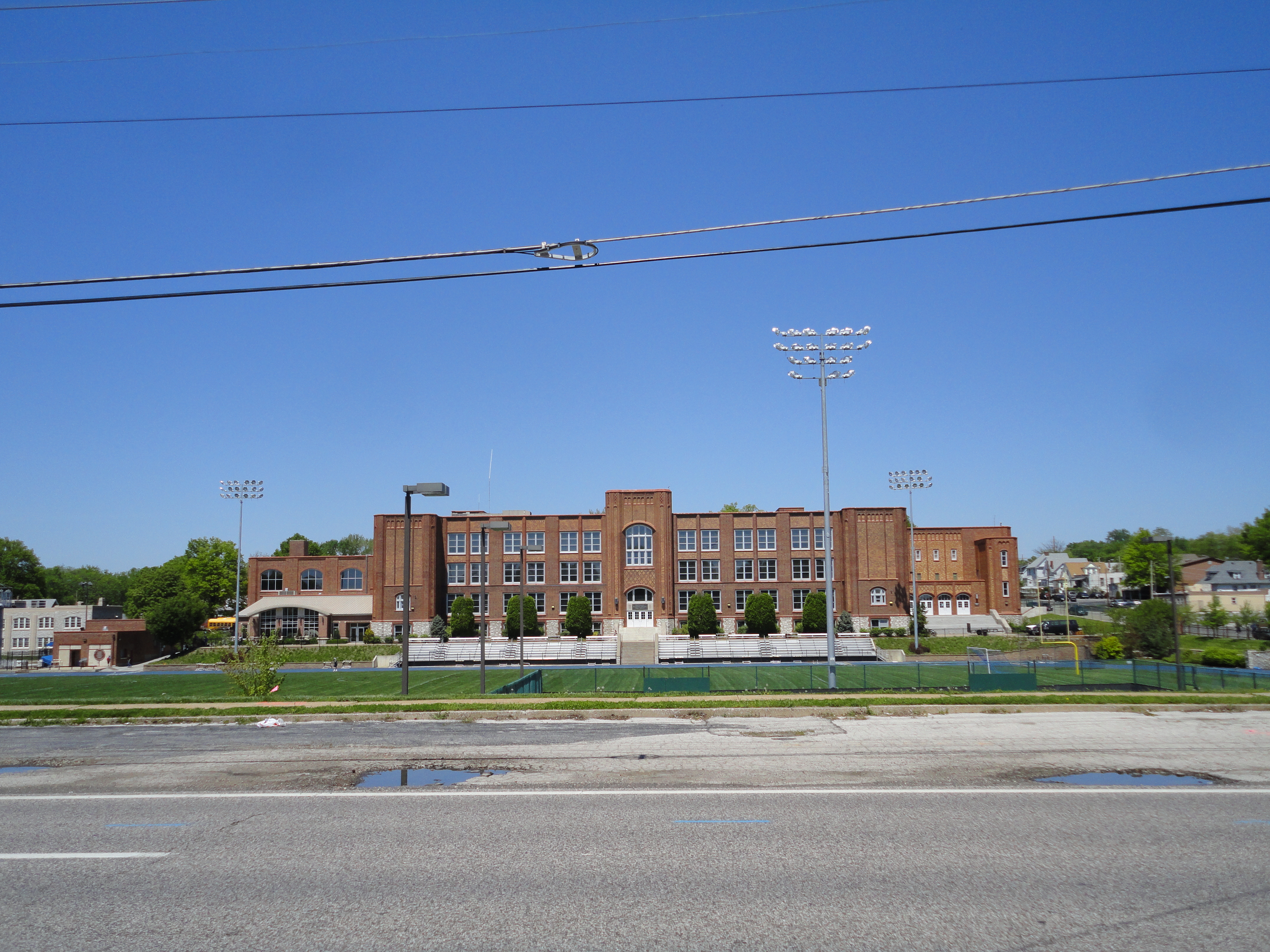
Maplewood Richmond Heights High School, April 2011

Maplewood Richmond Heights High School is a public high school in Maplewood, Missouri, United States.

== History ==
Maplewood Richmond Heights School District was established in 1876 after St. Louis split from St. Louis County. The original high school building, designed by famed school architect William B. Ittner, built in 1929, is still standing and in use today.

As of 2022 the building has been undergoing major renovations and expansion.

== Athletics ==
In fall 2007, Maplewood's football team was undefeated in the regular season, losing to Blair Oaks, the defending state champions, in the state championship semifinal round with a score of 42–14. Maplewood's final record for the season was 12–1.

In 2015, Maplewood Richmond Heights High School canceled its football program for the 2015–2016 season. Reasons included a lack of interest among the student body, injuries, and school size. Soccer replaced football for the school's homecoming game.

In the fall of 2015, the MRH Blue Devils soccer team broke the school's single season record in wins (20) after finishing the 2015–16 season 20–6.

Current sports are:

- Baseball
- Boys' basketball
  - State championships: 2007, 2008
- Girls' basketball
- Volleyball
- Cheerleading
- Girls' soccer
- Boys' soccer
- Cross country
- Track and field
- Wrestling
  - State championships: 1941, 1942, 1943, 1944, 1945, 1946, 1973
- Girls' softball
- Boys golf

== Notable alumni ==
- Tershawn Wharton, professional American football defensive end and Super Bowl LVII champion for the Kansas City Chiefs.
- Mark Christman, professional Major League Baseball infielder for the St. Louis Browns.
- Paul Christman, professional American Football quarterback for the Chicago Cardinals and Green Bay Packers.
