= Rock Hill Public Library =

- 38.60704°N 90.37406°W
- Location: Rock Hill, Missouri
- Established: 1943

Collection
- Size: 19,000+ items

Access and use
- Circulation: 51,101
- Members: 2,473

Other information
- Director: Erin Phelps
- Website: www.rockhillpubliclibrary.org

The Rock Hill Public Library is a public library in Rock Hill, Missouri, a suburb of St. Louis. Established in 1943, the library holds more than 19,000 items.

The Rock Hill Public Library is a member of the Municipal Library Consortium (MLC), which is made up of nine independent libraries in St. Louis County. The MLC houses a collection of over 700,000 items in total. In 2024, the consortium joined the Missouri Evergreen statewide library network, expanding access to over 4 million items across participating libraries.

== History ==
The Rock Hill Public Library was established in 1943 after community leaders recognized the need for a local public library in Rock Hill, Missouri. At the time, residents were required to travel to neighboring communities to access library services. On November 19, 1943, representatives from several local organizations, including the Lions Club and the Rock Hill Improvement Association, met at the historic Fairfax House and formed the Rock Hill Village Library Association.

The library opened to the public on June 4, 1944, occupying two rooms on the second floor of the Fairfax House. The initial collection consisted of approximately 1,600 books, and the library operated two days per week with a staff of volunteers.

In 1947, voters approved a ten-cent tax levy to provide stable financial support for the library. Following the approval of this measure, a board of trustees was established to oversee operations, and the library hired its first full-time librarian.

The library relocated in 1957 to the former Lions Club property at 9620 Manchester Road in Rock Hill, Missouri. The larger facility allowed the collection to expand to more than 6,000 books and supported the development of additional services. During construction of a new city hall building between 1963 and 1964, the library temporarily operated out of the Rock Hill Presbyterian Church. The combined city hall and library building was completed and dedicated on May 16, 1965, by which time the library’s collection had grown to approximately 20,000 volumes and the staff included five employees.

On May 31, 1996, the library joined seven other independent libraries to establish the Municipal Library Consortium (MLC) of St. Louis County. The consortium later expanded to nine member libraries and enabled shared catalogs and interlibrary delivery services among participating institutions.

In 2005, redevelopment of the city hall site required the library to vacate its location. It temporarily relocated to the Colonial Square Shopping Center on Manchester Road, reopening there on January 3, 2006. After purchasing and renovating a former paint store building, the library moved to its current location at 9811 Manchester Road in Rock Hill, Missouri in July 2012. The library now maintains an in-house collection of more than 19,000 items and continues to serve the Rock Hill community through a small professional staff of two full-time employees and three part-time employees.

== Services ==
The Rock Hill Public Library provides a circulating collection of books and media as well as access to digital resources, including e-books, e-audiobooks, and online databases. Patrons may also borrow a variety of nontraditional materials, such as telescopes, musical instruments, educational STEM kits, puzzles, and recreational equipment.

In addition to its circulating collection, the library offers public meeting space for community groups and organizations. A meeting room is available for reservation, and materials may be returned through an exterior drop box accessible outside regular operating hours. Through its membership in the Municipal Library Consortium of St. Louis County, library users also have access to shared catalogs and delivery services among participating municipal libraries.
