= Maplewood Richmond Heights School District =

School district in Missouri

Maplewood-Richmond Heights School District

Location
- 7539 Manchester Rd Maplewood, MO 63143-2913 St. Louis County United States

District information
- Established: 1876; 150 years ago
- Superintendent: Dr. Mary Hendricks-Harris
- Schools: 4
- Budget: $24,829,000 (2018-19)
- NCES District ID: 2920010

Students and staff
- Students: 1534 (2018-19)
- Teachers: 112.85 FTE
- Staff: 102.45 FTE
- Student–teacher ratio: 13.59
- Athletic conference: Suburban Central
- District mascot: Blue Devils
- Colors: Blue and White

Other information
- Website: mrhschools.net

Maplewood Richmond Heights School District or MRHSD, is a public school district in Maplewood, Missouri. The district serves primarily students who live in Maplewood, Richmond Heights and certain sections of Webster Groves.

== History ==
In 1840, the first school in the area opened off of Manchester Road and McCausland. This school was called the "Washington Institute", and later the Benton Station School. At the time, it was a part of St. Louis Public Schools, however, in 1876, St. Louis City separated from St. Louis County causing a need for new school districts to serve communities in the county, including Maplewood and the surrounding cities. In 1907, the first high school opened, making it one of the few high schools in St. Louis County. In 1929, construction began on a new high school, which is still in use today. By 1935, MRHSD had a running bus system for its pupils. In 1951, the name was changed from School District of Maplewood to Maplewood-Richmond Heights School District. In 2002, First Lady Laura Bush visited MRH to host a "community and character" national program. In 2004, a new elementary school was opened. Due to ongoing gentrification within the borders of the MRHSD, student body enrollment has jumped nearly 40% from 1990 to 2019 causing an increased demand for new schools. An Early Childhood Center was opened in the early 2000s to accommodate Pre-K children.

=== Milestones ===
- 1840 - First school in the area opened
- 1876 - St. Louis County separated from the city of St. Louis, resulting in the formation of a new school district in Maplewood
- 1888 - Bartold Valley School is constructed
- 1892 - the two-room Bartold Valley School is replaced with an eight-room school and renamed Valley School
- 1906 - voters change the district from a rural school district to a village school district, Sutton School, and East Richmond School are built
- 1909 - Lincoln School for Negroes opens with nine students in rented space in the Church of the Living God
- 1910 - County courts officially designate the district as Maplewood City Schools
- 1916 - Lincoln School for Negroes and a new high school building are constructed
- 1921 - a second portion of the high school is approved for construction
- 1922 - West Richmond School opens with portable classrooms
- 1929 - construction begins on the current high school, designed by William B. Ittner, Black students attend Douglas School in Webster Groves, or Sumner or Vashon High School in St. Louis.
- 1933 - "The New Lincoln School" is constructed and used in conjunction with what is now called "The Old Lincoln School". Grades 5-8 meet in the new building and 1-4 in the old school building.
- 1951 - the district expands and is re-named the Maplewood-Richmond Heights School District
- 1953 - voters approve funds for a new Valley School and additions to East Richmond and the New Lincoln School. The old Valley School and the Old Lincoln School are sold.
- 1955 - the school board moves to integrate the high school over the next two years
- 1963 - a new school is funded to replace Sutton.
- 1964 - the Lincoln School is closed and sold to the Special School District
- 1978 - facing financial difficulties, 21 teaching positions are eliminated, the district closes the Junior High School, and changes schools to be grade centers:
  - Early Childhood Center (K-2) operates at the Valley School location
  - Nolan Bruce Elementary (3-5) operates at the site of the former Sutton School
  - Cheney Elementary (2-5) operates at the former East Richmond School
  - AB Green Middle School (6-8) operates at the former West Richmond School
- 1986 - the number of students continues to decline and 47 teaching positions are eliminated
- 2001 - a bond issue passes to construct a new elementary school at the site of the Cheney Elementary School, and to renovate a middle school center in the high school building.
- 2002 - First Lady Laura Bush chooses MRH as the site to launch her "community and Character" program. MRH opens its Student Success Center, an alternative high school, within the high school building.
- 2020 - a bond issue is passed for an addition to the Middle School/High School building.

== Academics ==
In 2018-19, the district wide average ACT score is 19.5 and 68% of students go to college. The annual performance score was 97.5 indicating it is well above the benchmark set by the state of Missouri to be a "fully accredited" school district".

== Demographics ==
White	African American	Asian American	Latino	Two or More Races
74%	17%	3%	3%	2%

== Finances ==
In the 2016–2017 school year, MRHSD had $19,483,000 worth of expenditures and $22,800,000 worth of revenue.

== List of Schools ==
- Maplewood Richmond Heights High School
- MRH Middle School
- MRH Elementary School
- Early Education Center
