= Immacolata School =

Location
- 8910 Clayton Road; St. Louis, Missouri; United States
- Coordinates: 38°38′18″N 90°21′04″W

Information
- Type: Roman Catholic, parochial
- Motto: Go Immac
- Established: 1949
- Principal: Mr. Tom Havrilka
- Grades: K–8
- Enrollment: ≈275
- Colors: Blue and white
- Website: immacolata.org

Immacolata School is a Catholic school in Immacolata Parish, Richmond Heights, Missouri. The school was founded in September 1949 by the Sisters of St. Joseph of Carondelet. Students attend from grades Preschool through eighth. Immacolata School's first graduating class was in 1950. The cornerstone was laid on the main building in 1949. The principal of Immacolata School is Dr. Jennifer Stutsman, a former long-time middle school Social Studies and Science teacher at the school. The pastor is Rev. Msgr. Vernon Gardin. In 2008, the Parish built a new school wing which added classrooms, offices and a conference room. Other recent improvements include a renovated playground, athletic fields, kitchen and cafeteria as well as a new wooden floor in the gymnasium. Students attend from the parish's boundaries as well as from neighboring areas.
