= Kirkwood Public Library =

Public library in Missouri, US

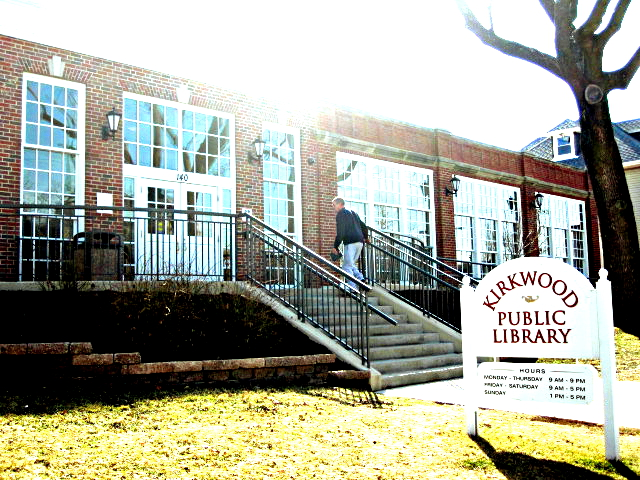
- 38°34′54.8″N 90°24′16.18″W
- Location: Kirkwood, Missouri, United States
- Type: Public Library
- Established: 1924

Collection
- Size: 118,217

Access and use
- Circulation: 466,285
- Population served: Kirkwood, Missouri, St. Louis County, Missouri, St. Louis, St. Charles County, Missouri,
- Members: 27,505

Other information
- Budget: $2.7 million
- Director: Christa Van Herreweghe
- Employees: 48
- Website: http://kirkwoodpubliclibrary.org

Kirkwood Public Library (KPL) primarily serves residents of the city of Kirkwood, Missouri, USA. The library is operated independently, and is a part of the Municipal Library Consortium of St. Louis County (MLC), which connects it to 8 other independently operated libraries in neighboring St. Louis County municipalities. It is a member of the Downtown Special Business District and the Kirkwood Des Peres Area Chamber of Commerce. In 1930, the Kirkwood Public Library helped to open the Ferguson Municipal Public Library by donating its initial first books.

== Unique To This Library ==
The library features several special collections. A Hot DVD collection of new and blockbuster films and Hot Reads featuring popular and bestselling titles available on a first come first serve basis. The library also houses a Community Spotlight collection featuring books about and written by local authors.

In May 2012, the Missouri History Museum donated a historical map of the city of Kirkwood, Missouri’s African American population to the Kirkwood Public Library. Previously, the map had been a part of the museum’s 6-month “Kirkwood Roots” exhibit.

== History ==
The library underwent major renovations in 2010, which required it to move to a temporary location. The MLC was formed in May 1996 and Kirkwood Public Library was one of its original members.

== Gallery ==
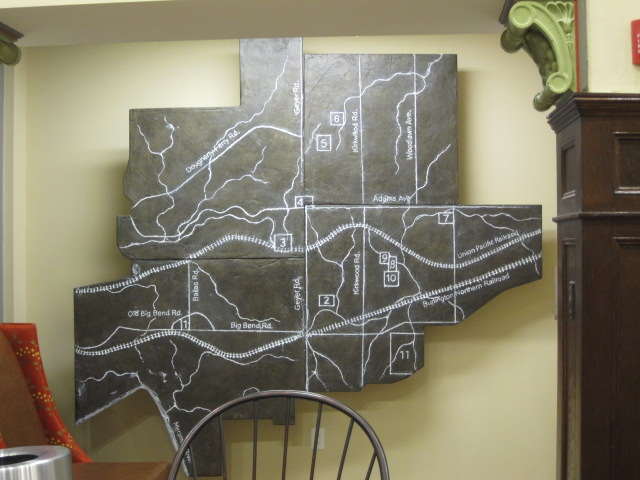
Map donated by the Missouri History Museum to Kirkwood Public Library.
