= Maplewood Public Library =

Public library in Maplewood, Missouri, the United States

- 38.61463°N 90.32554°W
- Location: Maplewood, Missouri
- Established: 1935

Collection
- Size: 43,000

Access and use
- Circulation: 77,070 (2013)

Other information
- Director: Ashley Bryant
- Website: maplewoodpubliclibrary.org

The Maplewood Public Library is a public library in Maplewood, Missouri, a suburb of St. Louis. The library was established in 1935.

It is a member of the Municipal Library Consortium of St. Louis County, nine independent libraries in St. Louis County.
