= Fairfax House (Rock Hill, Missouri) =

- U.S. National Register of Historic Places
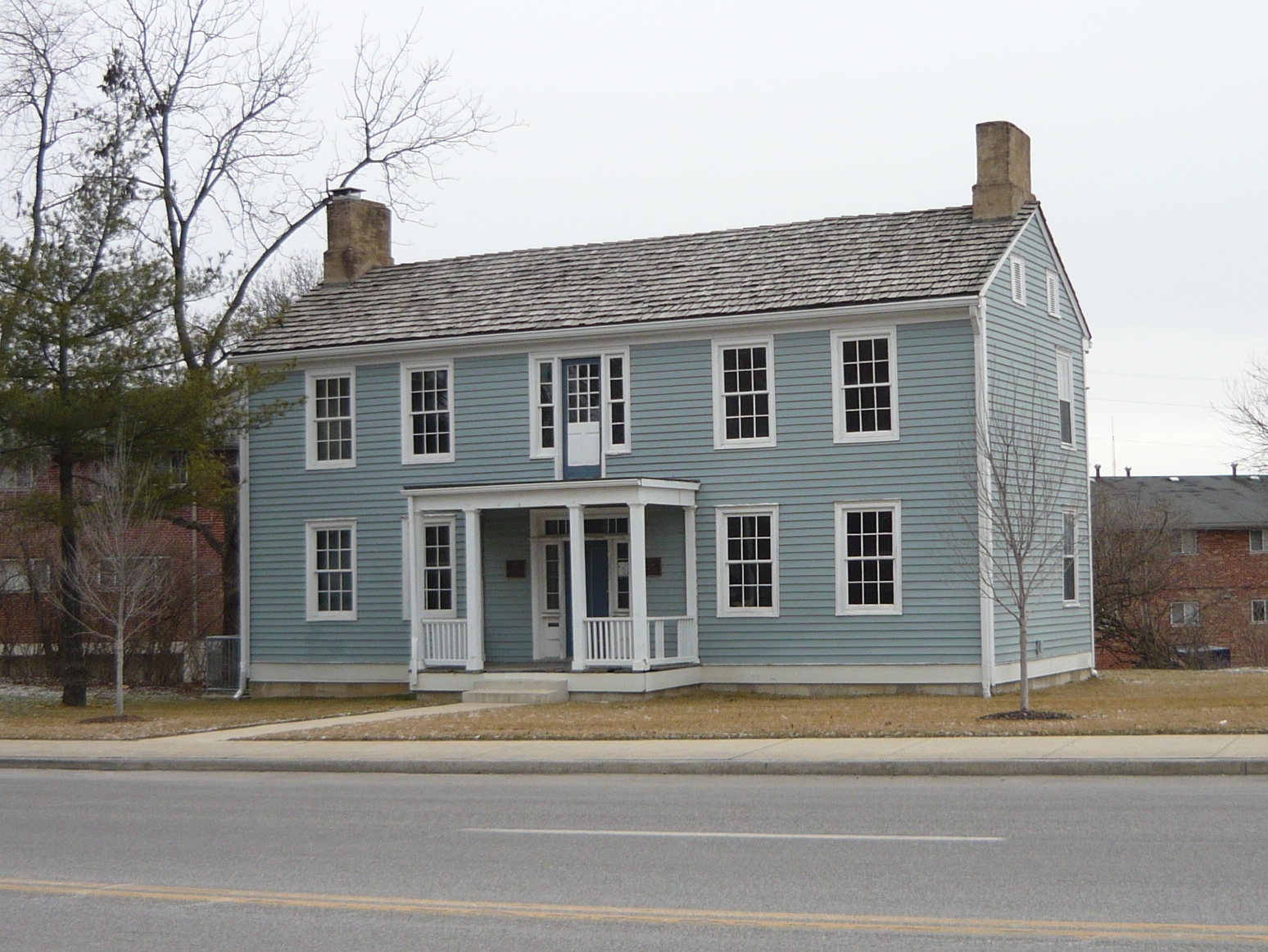
- The Fairfax House in February 2016
- Built: 1841
- Architectural style: Greek Revival
- NRHP reference No.: 04000280
- Added to NRHP: 2004

The Fairfax House is a historic structure in Rock Hill, Missouri. The house is owned by the City of Rock hill and is currently resting near the north east corner of the intersection of McKnight Road and Manchester Road.

Virginians James Collier Marshall, his brother, John, and two sisters settled in St. Louis County in 1832. James bought 500 acres in what became Rock Hill, Missouri. James built the house c. 1841, around the time he married his wife. The home became known as "Fairfax House".

In 1941 due to impending development, the home was sold to the City of Rock Hill and moved from its original location at 9400 Manchester Road to 9430 Manchester Road. Soon, the City of Rock Hill opened a library in the building in June 1944 on the second floor of Fairfax House. The volunteer-run library was supported by donations and open two days a week. It was later moved to the first floor. In 1957, the library was moved to the Lions Club building on Manchester Road. Fairfax House was occupied as business space until 1997, when it was moved across Manchester Road to a site next to the Rock Hill Presbyterian Church. In 2001, the Rock Hill Historic Preservation Commission said it was seeking private funds for a $300,000 to $400,000 renovation to turn the house into an interpretative learning center. In July 2002 the city council funded a $27,000 restoration. In 2004 the house was placed on the National Register of Historic Places and on the Daughters of the American Revolution historic sites listing. Exterior restorations continued for several years in an attempt to preserve the deteriorating home.

The property was put up for sale by the Giddings Lovejoy Presbytery which forced the vacating of the church and the home in 2011. Because the home was on the National Register of Historic Places it could not be destroyed and was thus moved to a lot around the corner on McKnight Road. The historic church built in the 1850s was torn down because funds could not be raised to relocate it. A gas station now occupies the corner.
