= University City Public Library =

Public library in University City, Kansas

- 38°39′24″N 90°18′33″W
- Location: University City, Missouri
- Established: 1939

Collection
- Size: 218,000 items

Access and use
- Circulation: 485,087 (2009-10)
- Members: 37,300

Other information
- Director: Patrick Wall (2011-) Linda Ballard (1993-2011)
- Website: http://www.ucpl.lib.mo.us/

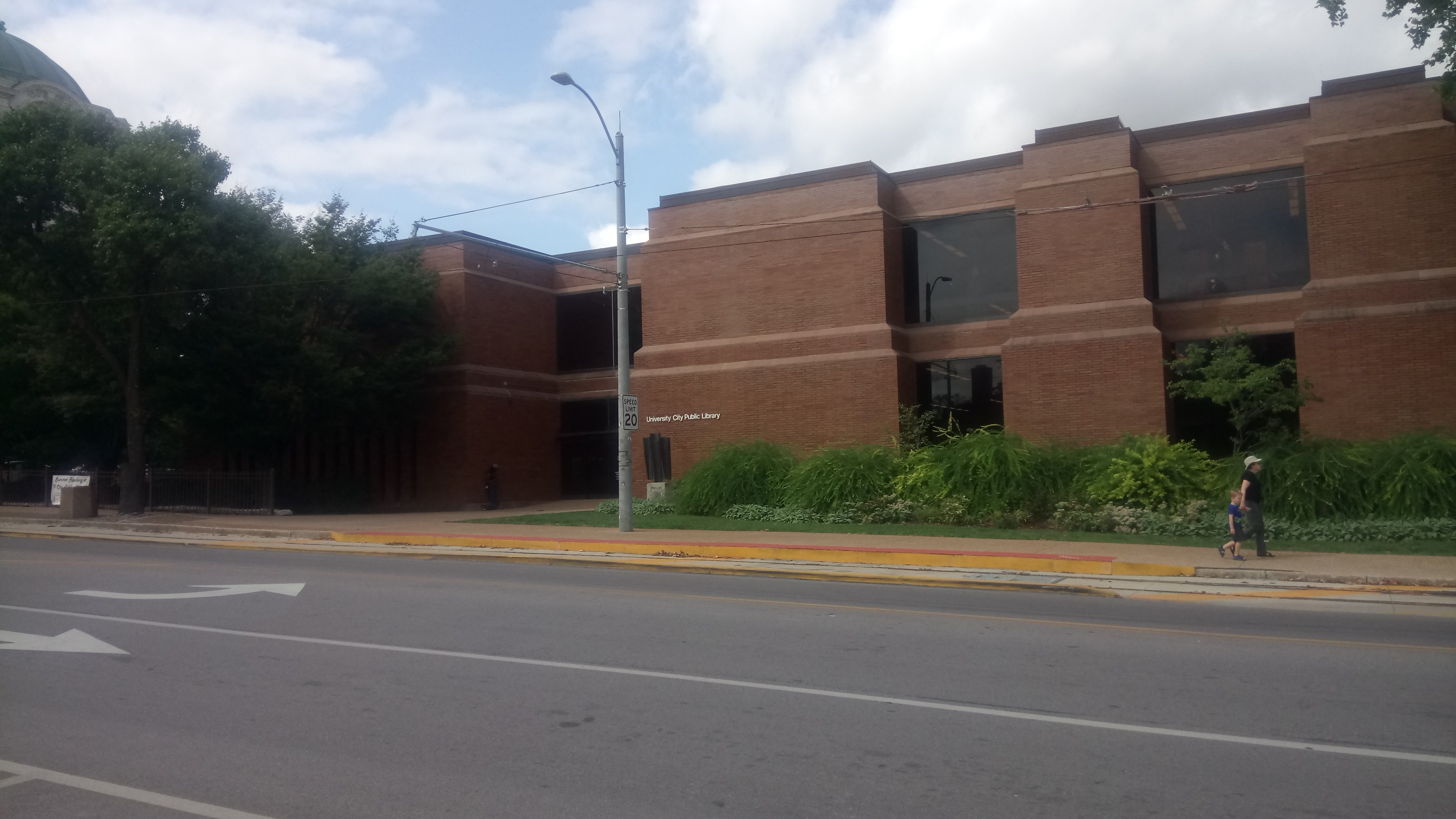
University City Public Library

The University City Public Library is a public library in University City, Missouri, near the Delmar Loop. Established in 1939, the library holds more than 150,000 books. It offers several activities and services for all ages.

It is a member of the Municipal Library Consortium of St. Louis County, nine independent libraries in St. Louis County.
