= Municipal Library Consortium of St. Louis County =

- Location: St. Louis County, Missouri
- Established: 1996

Collection
- Size: 700,000+ items

Other information
- Website: Official website

The Municipal Library Consortium of St. Louis County (MLC) is a partnership of nine independent public libraries in St. Louis County, Missouri, US. It was formed in 1997 as a way for the libraries to share a patron and bibliographic database as well as other resources. A valid library card from any of the member libraries can be used in any other MLC library.

== History ==
On May 31, 1996, eight independent public libraries in St. Louis County formed the MLC, including Brentwood Public Library, Ferguson Municipal Public Library, Kirkwood Public Library, Maplewood Public Library, Richmond Heights Memorial Library, Rock Hill Public Library, University City Public Library and Valley Park Community Library. Webster Groves Public Library later joined increasing the number of member libraries to nine.

== Facilities ==
MLC consists of nine independent public libraries including:

- Brentwood Public Library
- Ferguson Municipal Public Library
- Kirkwood Public Library
- Maplewood Public Library
- Richmond Heights Memorial Library
- Rock Hill Public Library
- University City Public Library
- Valley Park Community Library
- Webster Groves Public Library

== See also ==
- Education in Greater St. Louis
