= Richmond Heights Memorial Library =

- 38°37′42.94″N 90°19′51.51″W
- Location: Richmond Heights, Missouri
- Established: 1933

Collection
- Size: 60,000+ items

Other information
- Website: http://www.richmondheightslibrary.org/

The Richmond Heights Memorial Library is a public library in Richmond Heights, Missouri, a suburb of St. Louis. Established in 1933, the library holds more than 60,000 items. It offers several activities and services for all ages.

It is a member of the Municipal Library Consortium of St. Louis County, nine independent libraries in St. Louis County.
