= Webster Groves Public Library =

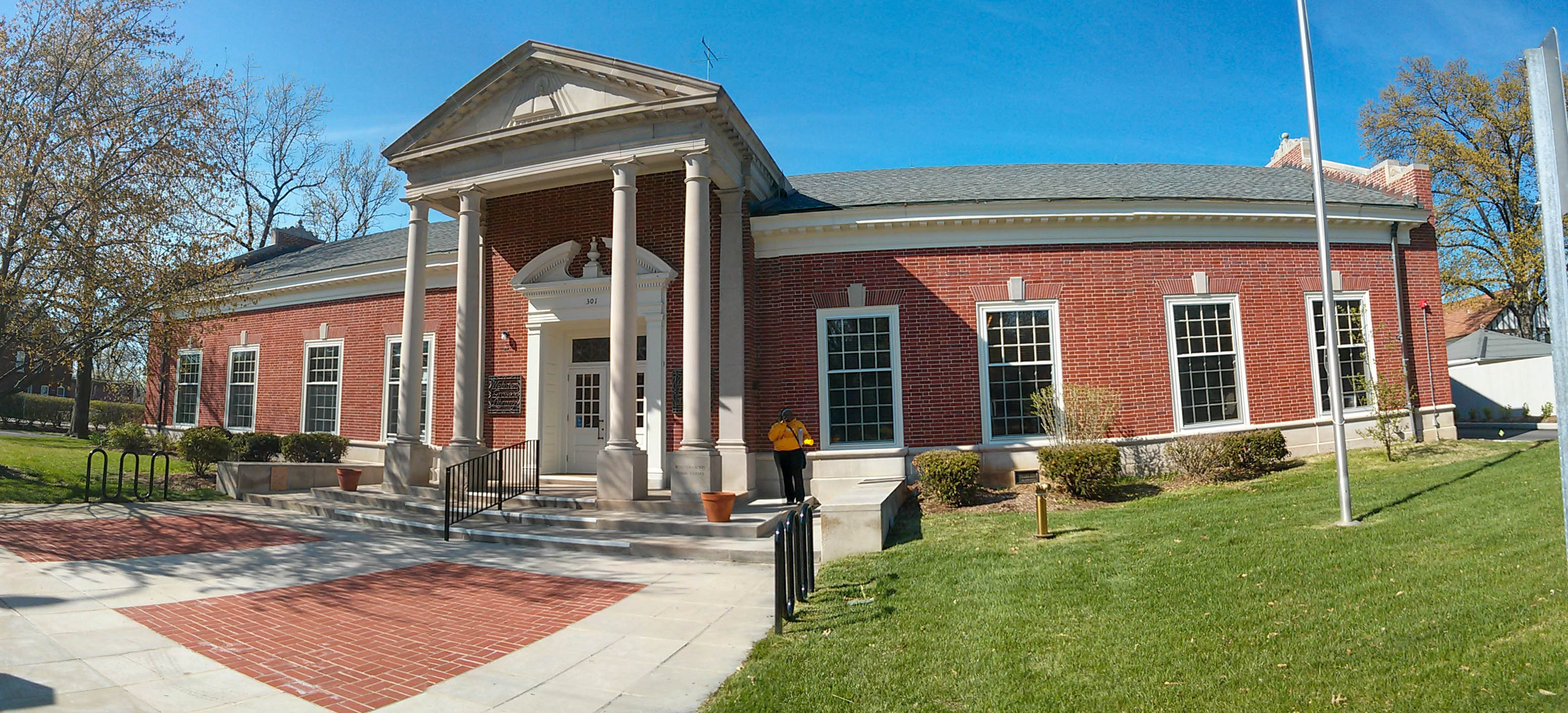
- WGPL in 2013
- Location: Webster Groves, Missouri, United States
- Established: 1911

Collection
- Size: 70,000

Other information
- Director: Tom Cooper
- Affiliation: Municipal Library Consortium of St. Louis County
- Website: wgpl.org

The Webster Groves Public Library is a municipal library in Webster Groves, Missouri. It is a member of the Municipal Library Consortium of St. Louis County.

== History ==
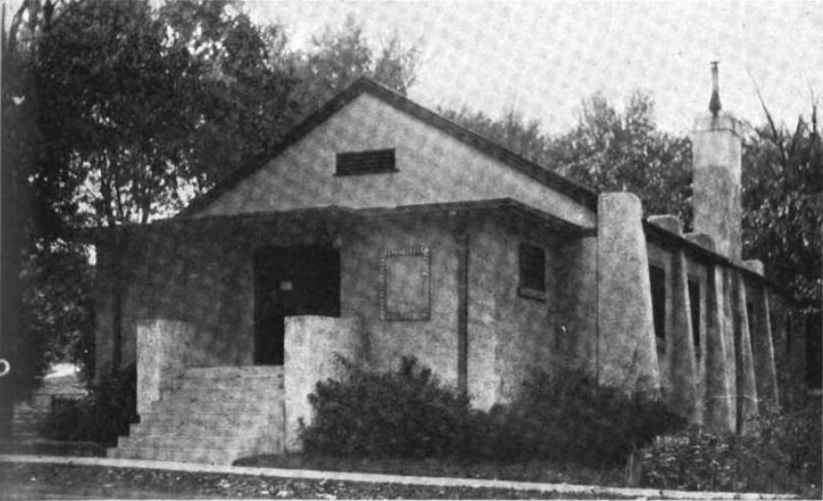
The original library built in 1911.

=== Early years ===
The oldest public library in St. Louis County, Missouri, Webster Groves Public Library originated in a small reading room opened by First Congregational Church in 1884. When the Church built a new sanctuary in 1893 it included a library and reading room that was open to the public. Eventually Church leadership decided that the reading room was not meeting its mission, and it was closed in 1908. Management of the library then passed to the Monday Club of Webster Groves. In 1911 Webster Groves residents William and Jennie Jager donated land to the Monday Club to erect a building, under the condition that it include space for a public library. The building was designed by architect Lawrence Ewald and built at a cost of US$6000, and opened on October 12, 1911. The library was managed by five volunteer assistants and a librarian salaried by the City of Webster Groves. It was open two afternoons and one morning each week and was also open to the Monday Club for meetings.

On April 5, 1927, the citizens of Webster Groves voted 2,887 to 551 in favor of a tax levy to fund the library, making it one of the first tax-supported municipal libraries in St. Louis County. At the time, the school board was building an addition to the Webster Groves High School and offered to include a space for the library in it. The public library remained in the high school from 1928 to 1951.

During the 1930s, a second library was established in North Webster with the help of Douglass High School Principal Howell Goins for access by African-Americans. Because the high school, like all high schools at the time, was segregated, African Americans were only allowed entrance to the library one afternoon a week. This second library at Douglass High School was staffed by a librarian whose salary was split between the library board and the Board of Education.

=== 1951 Building at 301 E. Lockwood Avenue ===
Late in the 1940s the Library Board began planning for a stand-alone library building, and funds were raised through a bond issue that passed in 1947. A site was picked at the corner of Lockwood and Orchard Avenues, along the southern edge of the neighborhood known as Webster Park. The building was designed by the St. Louis firm of J. P. Hoener Associates, and the grand opening was held in October, 1951.

Over time, the library's services outgrew the space in this building, which was just under 11,000 square feet. Cubicles to house staff offices were built in the main reading room; Children's Services were moved to the Auditorium, leaving the library without a public meeting room.

From the late 1990s, various library boards at various times talked about an expansion plan for the building, but were met by the problem that the building was largely landlocked, with residences on most sides.

Another long-term problem for the library was the lack of sufficient parking. In 1999, the residence at 227 E. Lockwood, across Orchard Avenue from the library, was listed for sale. The library board voted to purchase this house and subsequently applied to the Webster Groves Plan Commission for a Conditional Use Permit to subdivide the rather large lot this house sat on, in order to build a parking lot at the southeast corner of Lockwood and Orchard Avenues. The plan occasioned some opposition in the community from people who did not want a parking lot built and did not believe that the level of traffic in and out of the library made it necessary. But the library board prevailed, and the parking lot was built. The residence, with its smaller lot, was then sold.

In 2003 another residence to the east of the library was listed for sale, and the library board purchased it, as well, hoping that a property contiguous to the library building could provide space for an expansion. This plan grew problematic, as the board began to realize the many impediments to using this old house, since its use as a public building required handicapped accessibility and new restrooms; however, the cost of razing the house and expanding the library building was unfeasible.

==== Library expansion ====
In February 2009, voters in Webster Groves approved a 13 ½ cent tax levy increase. Four and a half cents of that increase were meant to improve operating revenues, while 9 cents would fund the sale of bonds to pay for a renovation and expansion of the building at 301 E. Lockwood Avenue. The highly regarded St. Louis firm of Powers Bowersox Associates was hired for design work. The building they designed included all the requested components, including an entire second floor dedicated to children’s services and a meeting room where classes could be held and community groups could meet. But it also went the original plans one better by adding a lower level Computer and Reference Room, leaving the entire original Reading Room open for browsing and reading. The addition, clad in a glass curtain wall, was embraced as a striking and bold design statement by the city’s Architectural Review Board, though it met opposition from a small group of neighbors, who believed it clashed with the design of the original building.

Construction began in late 2010, but in late September 2011, the general contractor, Frederich Construction, Incorporated, experiencing severe legal and financial problems, defaulted on their contract. Their surety company, Travelers Insurance, stepped in and oversaw the hiring of a new general contractor, Demien Construction. Demien completed the building in December 2012, about six months after the originally planned completion date.
