= St. Louis County Law Library =

Law library

Coordinates: 38°38′54″N 90°20′21″W

The St. Louis County Law Library in Missouri was established in 1941 as a public law library under Missouri Statute. It is located on the sixth floor of the Courts building in the St. Louis County Courthouse at 105 South Central in Clayton, Missouri.

It operates as a public agency, independent of St. Louis County government. It is funded from a portion of the surcharge paid by parties to civil lawsuits in the 21st Judicial Circuit of the Missouri Circuit Courts.

== Collection ==
The St. Louis County Law Library print collection is made up of many volumes including portions of the West National Reporter System, along with loose-leaf material, and a substantial portion of major treatises on a wide range of legal and ancillary disciplines. In addition, the St. Louis County Law Library also grants free access to Westlaw.
