= Brentwood Public Library =

Public library in Missouri

- 38°37′5.18″N 90°20′52.59″W
- Location: Brentwood, Missouri
- Established: 1938

Collection
- Size: 53,000+ items

Access and use
- Members: 3,700

Other information
- Website: http://www.brentwood.lib.mo.us/

The Brentwood Public Library is a public library in Brentwood, Missouri, a suburb of St. Louis. Established in 1938, the library holds more than 53,000 items. It offers several activities and services for all ages.

It is a member of the Municipal Library Consortium of St. Louis County, nine independent libraries in St. Louis County. Author Irene Hannon is a former employee of the library.
