= Richmond Heights, Missouri =

- City
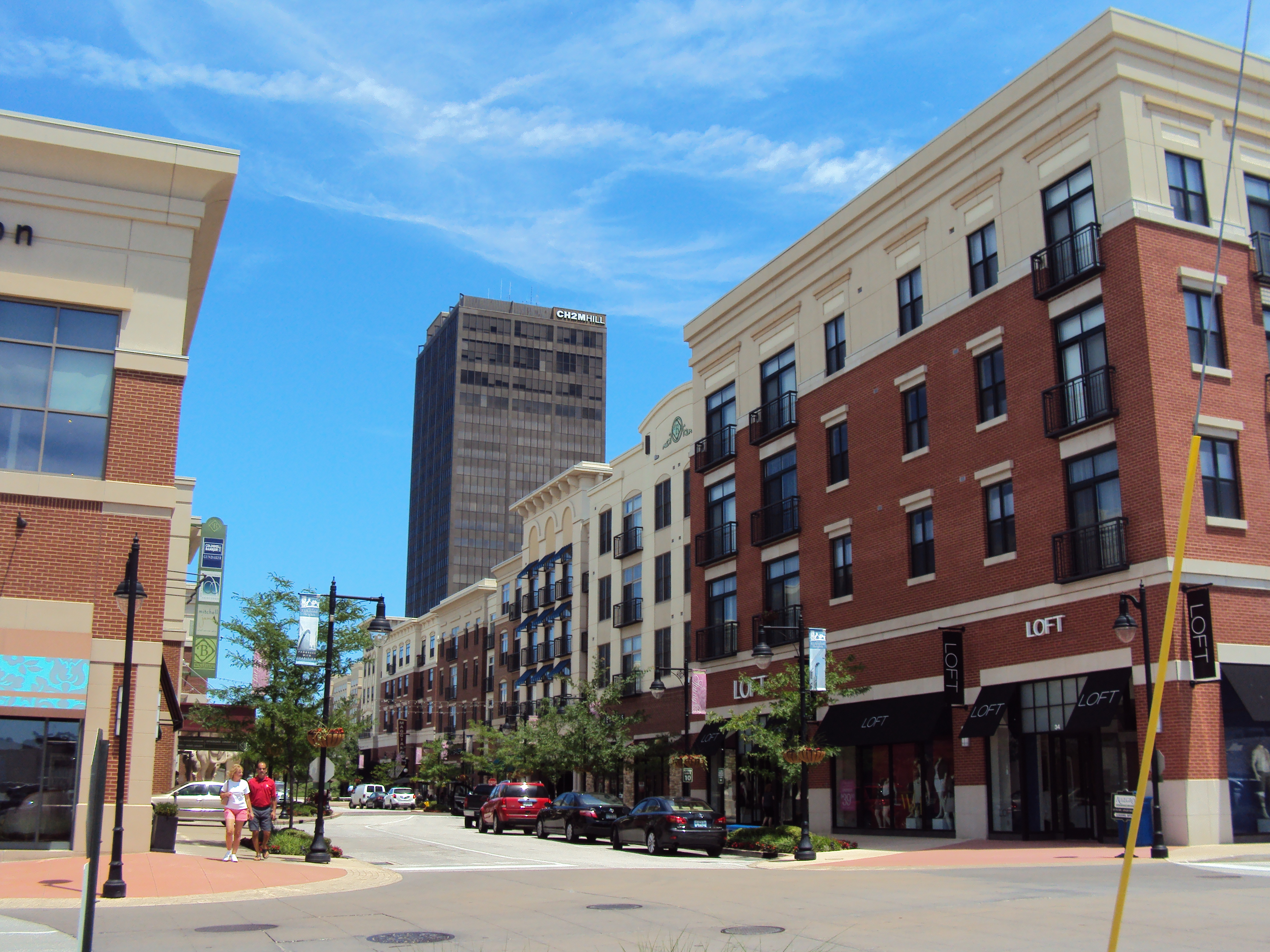
- The Boulevard shopping area, June 2010

- Location of Richmond Heights, Missouri
- Coordinates: 38°37′42″N 90°19′43″W
- Country: United States
- State: Missouri
- County: St. Louis

Government
  - Type: Council-Manager
  - Mayor: Reginald Finney
  - City Manager: Amy Hamilton

Area
  - Total: 2.29 sq mi (5.93 km^{2})
  - Land: 2.29 sq mi (5.93 km^{2})
  - Water: 0 sq mi (0.00 km^{2})
- Elevation: 495 ft (151 m)

Population (2020)
  - Total: 9,286
  - Density: 4,054/sq mi (1,565.3/km^{2})
- Time zone: UTC-6 (Central (CST))
  - Summer (DST): UTC-5 (CDT)
- ZIP code: 63117
- Area code: 314
- FIPS code: 29-61706
- GNIS feature ID: 2396370
- Website: http://www.richmondheights.org/

Richmond Heights is a city in St. Louis County, Missouri. It is an inner-ring suburb of St. Louis, Missouri, United States. The United States census shows the population grew from 8,603 in 2010 to 9,286 in 2020. According to Robert L. Ramsay, the name was suggested by Robert E. Lee, who thought the topography of the area resembled Richmond, Virginia.

== Geography ==
According to the United States Census Bureau, the city has a total area of 2.30 square miles (5.96 km^{2}), all land.

=== Highways ===
Richmond Heights has several major highways within its boundaries: Interstate 170, Interstate 64 and U.S. Route 40.

== Demographics ==
Historical population
Census	Pop.	Note	%±
1920	2,136		—
1930	9,150		328.4%
1940	12,802		39.9%
1950	15,045		17.5%
1960	15,622		3.8%
1970	13,802		−11.7%
1980	11,516		−16.6%
1990	10,448		−9.3%
2000	9,602		−8.1%
2010	8,603		−10.4%
2020	9,286		7.9%
U.S. Decennial Census

=== Racial and ethnic composition ===
Richmond Heights city, Missouri – Racial and ethnic composition Note: the US Census treats Hispanic/Latino as an ethnic category. This table excludes Latinos from the racial categories and assigns them to a separate category. Hispanics/Latinos may be of any race.
Race / Ethnicity (NH = Non-Hispanic)	Pop 2000	Pop 2010	Pop 2020	% 2000	% 2010	% 2020
White alone (NH)	7,704	6,889	7,155	80.23%	80.08%	77.05%
Black or African American alone (NH)	1,276	988	800	13.29%	11.48%	8.62%
Native American or Alaska Native alone (NH)	19	15	9	0.20%	0.17%	0.10%
Asian alone (NH)	305	358	543	3.18%	4.16%	5.85%
Native Hawaiian or Pacific Islander alone (NH)	1	2	0	0.01%	0.02%	0.00%
Other race alone (NH)	13	10	30	0.14%	0.12%	0.32%
Mixed race or Multiracial (NH)	117	144	381	1.22%	1.67%	4.10%
Hispanic or Latino (any race)	167	197	368	1.74%	2.29%	3.96%
Total	9,602	8,603	9,286	100.00%	100.00%	100.00%

=== 2020 census ===
As of the 2020 census, Richmond Heights had a population of 9,286. The median age was 37.4 years. 18.9% of residents were under the age of 18 and 16.0% were 65 years of age or older. For every 100 females there were 88.7 males, and for every 100 females age 18 and over there were 86.9 males age 18 and over.

The population density was 4,055.0 per square mile (1,565.9/km^{2}).

100.0% of residents lived in urban areas, while 0.0% lived in rural areas.

There were 4,553 households in Richmond Heights, of which 22.4% had children under the age of 18 living in them. Of all households, 36.9% were married-couple households, 22.1% were households with a male householder and no spouse or partner present, and 33.9% were households with a female householder and no spouse or partner present. About 42.2% of all households were made up of individuals and 11.3% had someone living alone who was 65 years of age or older.

There were 4,899 housing units, of which 7.1% were vacant. The homeowner vacancy rate was 0.7% and the rental vacancy rate was 7.0%.

=== Income and poverty ===
The 2016–2020 5-year American Community Survey estimates show that the median household income was $88,289 (with a margin of error of +/- $14,706) and the median family income was $130,283 (+/- $16,078). Males had a median income of $54,616 (+/- $8,409) versus $54,154 (+/- $8,790) for females. The median income for those above 16 years old was $54,405 (+/- $6,603). Approximately, 2.4% of families and 4.6% of the population were below the poverty line, including 1.2% of those under the age of 18 and 6.7% of those ages 65 or over.

=== Education ===
The educational attainment of residents 25 years and older was 7.9% high school or equivalent degree, 10.6% some college with no degree, 4.4% associate’s degree, 35.4% bachelor’s degree, and 40.3% graduate or professional degree. The population ages 3 and over enrolled in school was 12% in nursery or preschool, 54.8% in kindergarten to 12th grade, 20.8% college undergraduate, and 12.4% in graduate school.

=== 2010 census ===
As of the census of 2010, there were 8,603 people, 4,244 households, and 2,012 families living in the city. The population density was 3,740.4 inhabitants per square mile (1,444.2/km^{2}). There were 4,680 housing units at an average density of 2,034.8 per square mile (785.6/km^{2}). The racial makeup of the city was 81.7% White, 11.6% African American, 0.2% Native American, 4.2% Asian, 0.5% from other races, and 1.8% from two or more races. Hispanic or Latino of any race were 2.3% of the population.

There were 4,244 households, of which 20.9% had children under the age of 18 living with them, 35.8% were married couples living together, 8.4% had a female householder with no husband present, 3.3% had a male householder with no wife present, and 52.6% were non-families. 42.4% of all households were made up of individuals, and 10.4% had someone living alone who was 65 years of age or older. The average household size was 2.01 and the average family size was 2.84.

The median age in the city was 38.6 years. 18.2% of residents were under the age of 18; 7.9% were between the ages of 18 and 24; 32.8% were from 25 to 44; 27.7% were from 45 to 64; and 13.5% were 65 years of age or older. The gender makeup of the city was 46.8% male and 53.2% female.

=== 2000 census ===
As of the census of 2000, there were 9,602 people, 4,647 households, and 2,202 families living in the city. The population density was 4,191.5 inhabitants per square mile (1,618.3/km^{2}). There were 4,931 housing units at an average density of 2,152.5 per square mile (831.1/km^{2}). The racial makeup of the city was 81.54% White, 13.32% African American, 0.25% Native American, 3.20% Asian, 0.01% Pacific Islander, 0.34% from other races, and 1.34% from two or more races. Hispanic or Latino of any race were 1.74% of the population.

In the city the population was spread out, with 19.2% under the age of 18, 9.0% from 18 to 24, 36.0% from 25 to 44, 21.0% from 45 to 64, and 14.7% who were 65 years of age or older. The median age was 36 years. For every 100 females, there were 85.6 males. For every 100 females age 18 and over, there were 80.1 males.

The median income for a household in the city was $50,557, and the median income for a family was $69,681. Males had a median income of $47,536 versus $35,407 for females. The per capita income for the city was $37,217. About 4.4% of families and 7.3% of the population were below the poverty line, including 8.3% of those under age 18 and 11.7% of those age 65 or over.

== Economy ==
Panera Bread was formerly headquartered in Richmond Heights. The Sisters of Saint Mary hospital, a movie theater, various notable small businesses, specialty shops, and franchised business locations. The Saint Louis Galleria is a prominent shopping mall in the area, and a large source of municipal revenue.

== Transportation ==
=== Public transportation ===
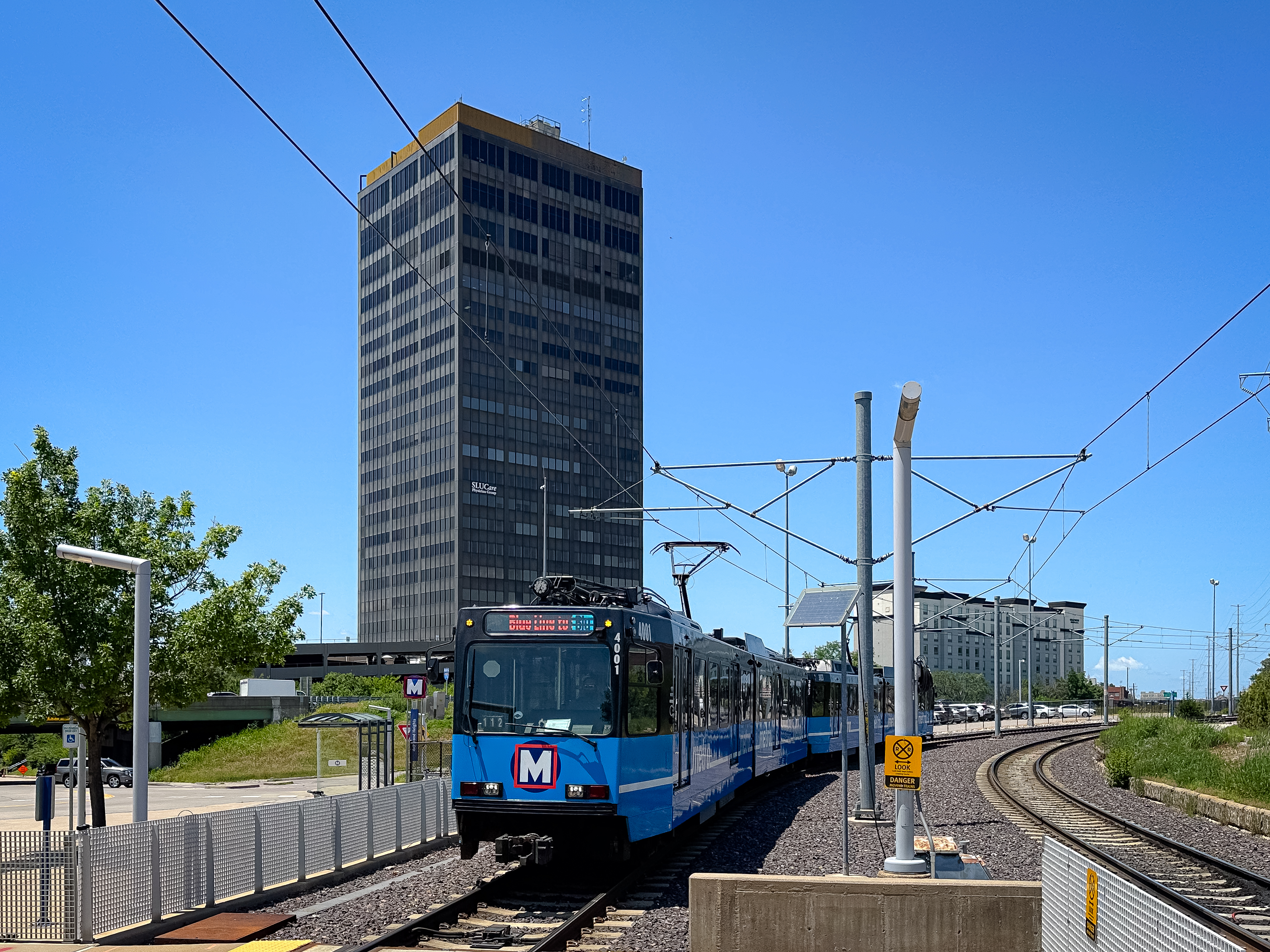
MetroLink near the Richmond Heights station

Richmond Heights is served by the Blue Line of the St. Louis region's MetroLink light rail system via the Richmond Heights station.

=== Major roads and highways ===
Major arterial routes in Richmond Heights include Big Bend Boulevard, Brentwood Boulevard, Clayton Road, Eager Road, Hanley Road, and McKnight Road. Interstate 64 also passes through the city traveling east and west, while Interstate 170 enters from the north and ends at I-64 and Eager Road.

== Education ==
Public education in Richmond Heights is administered by Maplewood-Richmond Heights School District.

Richmond Heights has a public library, the Richmond Heights Memorial Library.

== See also ==
- Evens & Howard Fire Brick Co., a specialty, high-temperature brick company in the city that established African American neighborhoods in Richmond Heights, despite racial segregation in St. Louis County at the time
- Fitz's, root beer brand started in Richmond Heights
- THE HEIGHTS Community Center, a facility with a fitness center, pool, community events rooms, and Richmond Heights Memorial Library.
- Hi-Pointe, St. Louis, adjoining St. Louis neighborhood
- Immacolata School, Catholic primary school
- International Schoolhouse, a Spanish-Immersion school for Pre-K through grade 2
- Little Flower Catholic School, Catholic K-8 school
- St. Louis Modern Chinese School, teaching Chinese language and arts
- Wydown/Skinker, St. Louis, narrow St. Louis neighborhood west of Forest Park and bordered on the south by Richmond Heights
