= Hop Alley =

Hop Alley may refer to:

- Chinatown, St. Louis
- Chinatown, Denver
