= List of Truman State University people =

The following is a list of notable people associated with Truman State University, located in the American city of Kirksville, Missouri.

== Notable alumni and faculty ==
=== Politics and government ===
- Samuel W. Arnold – former U.S. congressman from Missouri's 1st district
- Sean Bagniewski – member of the Iowa House of Representatives
- Jedh Colby Barker – United States Marine Corps, posthumous recipient of the Medal of Honor from the Vietnam War
- Robert J. Behnen – genealogist; former Republican member of the Missouri House of Representatives
- Beryl Franklin Carroll – 20th governor of Iowa
- John W. Cauthorn – former Republican member of the Missouri State Senate
- Mike Colona – Democratic member of the Missouri House of Representatives
- Sean J. Cooksey – commissioner of the Federal Election Commission
- John V. Cox – retired United States Marine Corps aviator and major general
- Zina Pickens Cruse – 20th Judicial Circuit judge in St. Clair County, Illinois
- Duke Cunningham – United States Navy veteran and former Republican member of the United States House of Representatives from California's 50th Congressional District
- Harsha de Silva – deputy minister of Foreign Affairs in Sri Lanka
- Hung Hsiu-chu (Continuing Education) – deputy speaker of the Legislative Yuan of Republic of China, Chairman of Kuomintang
- Alphonso Jackson – 13th U.S. secretary of Housing and Urban Development (HUD)
- Lyda Krewson – mayor of St. Louis
- Afoa Moega Lutu – American Samoan politician and lawyer who served as the former Attorney-General of Samoa in two different administrations
- Clare Magee – U.S. representative from Missouri
- Rebecca McClanahan – RN and professor of nursing; former Democratic member of the Missouri House of Representatives
- Susana A. Mendoza – current comptroller for the State of Illinois; former city clerk for the City of Chicago; former member of the Illinois House of Representatives
- John R. Murdock – U.S. representative from Arizona
- Maggie Nurrenbern – Missouri state senator from the 17th District
- John Pershing – Army officer who achieved rank of general of the Armies
- Milton Andrew Romjue – U.S. representative from Missouri
- Mary Rhodes Russell – judge on the Supreme Court of Missouri, appointed in 2004 and retained in 2006
- Ed Schieffer – Democratic member of the Missouri House of Representatives
- Eric Schmitt – Republican member of the Missouri Senate, 46th state treasurer of Missouri (2017–2019), 43rd attorney general of Missouri (2019–2023), U.S. senator (2023–present)
- Fred Schwengel – Republican member of the U.S. House of Representatives, 1955–1965 & 1967–73
- Scott Sifton – Democratic candidate for United States Senate, member of the Missouri Senate (2013–2021)
- Dan A. Sullivan – Republican member of the Arkansas House of Representatives from Jonesboro since 2015
- Arthur L. Willard – U.S. Navy vice admiral and recipient of the Navy Cross
- Peter Zeihan – geopolitiical analyst, author, and educator

=== Media and the arts ===
- Kristopher Battles – artist, known as the last remaining USMC combat artist in 2010
- Sandra Benitez – novelist
- Corinne Brinkerhoff – television producer and writer
- Mike Chen – Chinese-born American YouTuber
- Jenna Fischer – actress, best known for her role as Pam Beesly in the U.S. adaptation of The Office
- Kevin C. Fitzpatrick – non-fiction writer best known for his research of Dorothy Parker and the Algonquin Round Table
- Lori Nix – printer and photographer known for her work with dioramas
- Tara Osseck – Miss Missouri 2009
- Prajwal Parajuly – Nepali-speaking Indian author of The Gurkha's Daughter
- Rhonda Vincent – bluegrass singer, International Bluegrass Music Association's female vocalist of the year 2000–2006

=== Education ===
- Marc Becker – professor of History, included in The Professors: The 101 Most Dangerous Academics in America
- Jason Beckfield – professor of Sociology at Harvard University
- Glenn Frank – president of the University of Wisconsin–Madison
- Huping Ling – professor of History
- Emmanuel Nnadozie – Nigerian economist, author, educator; founder of the Truman McNair Program

=== Science and technology ===
- Harry H. Laughlin – leading eugenicist in the first half of the 20th century
- Charlie Miller – computer security researcher known for identifying vulnerabilities in Apple products and cars

=== Athletics ===
- Ray Armstead – gold medal winner in the 1984 Olympics (4 × 400 m relay)
- Gene Bartow – college basketball head coach for UCLA, UAB, Illinois, and Memphis
- Brian Dzingai – Zimbabwean Olympic sprinter
- Lenvil Elliott – former professional American football player who played running back for nine seasons in the NFL
- Don Faurot – conference champion football and basketball head coach, member of the College Football Hall of Fame
- Harry Gallatin – Truman men's basketball player, NBA player for the New York Knicks and the Detroit Pistons, coach of the New York Knicks and member of the Basketball Hall of Fame
- Tom Geredine – former professional American football player who played wide receiver for three seasons in the NFL
- Kane – real name Glenn Jacobs, WWE wrestler, played both football and basketball for Truman; former mayor of Knox County, Tennessee
- Gloria McCloskey – All-American Girls Professional Baseball League player
- Mike Morris – former long snapper for the Minnesota Vikings; current radio host on 1500 ESPN in Minneapolis
- Al Nipper – Major League Baseball coach; former pitcher for the Boston Red Sox, Chicago Cubs, and Cleveland Indians
- Ken Norton – boxer (one of the few to beat Muhammad Ali); father of future Super Bowl champion linebacker Ken Norton Jr.
- Bill Seman – former Canadian football player who played for the Hamilton Tiger-Cats
- Sharron Washington – former Canadian football player who played for the Hamilton Tiger-Cats
- Gregg Williams – Super Bowl-winning defensive coordinator for the New Orleans Saints, Buffalo Bills former head coach

== Presidents (TSU) ==
These persons have served as presidents or interim presidents of North Missouri Normal and Commercial School (1867–1868), North Missouri Normal School (1868–1870), North Missouri Normal School of the 1st District (1870–1918), Northeast Missouri State Teachers College (1918–1968), Northeast Missouri State College (1968–1972), Northeast Missouri State University (1972–1996), and Truman State University (1996–present).

Title	Name	Dates
President	Joseph Baldwin	1867–1881
President	William P. Nason	1881–1882
President	Joseph P. Blanton	1882–1891
President	William D. Dobson	1891–1899
President	John R. Kirk	1899–1925
President	Eugene Fair	1925–1937
President	Walter H. Ryle	1937–1967
President	F. Clark Elkins	1967–1969
President	Eli F. Mittler	1969–1970
President	Charles J. McClain	1970–1989
Interim President	Robert A. Dager	1989–1990
President	Russell G. Warren	1990–1994
President	W. Jack Magruder	1994–2003
President	Barbara Dixon	2003–2008
President	Darrell W. Krueger	2008–2010
President	Troy D. Paino	2010–2016
President	Susan L. Thomas	2016–present
