= China–Senegal relations =

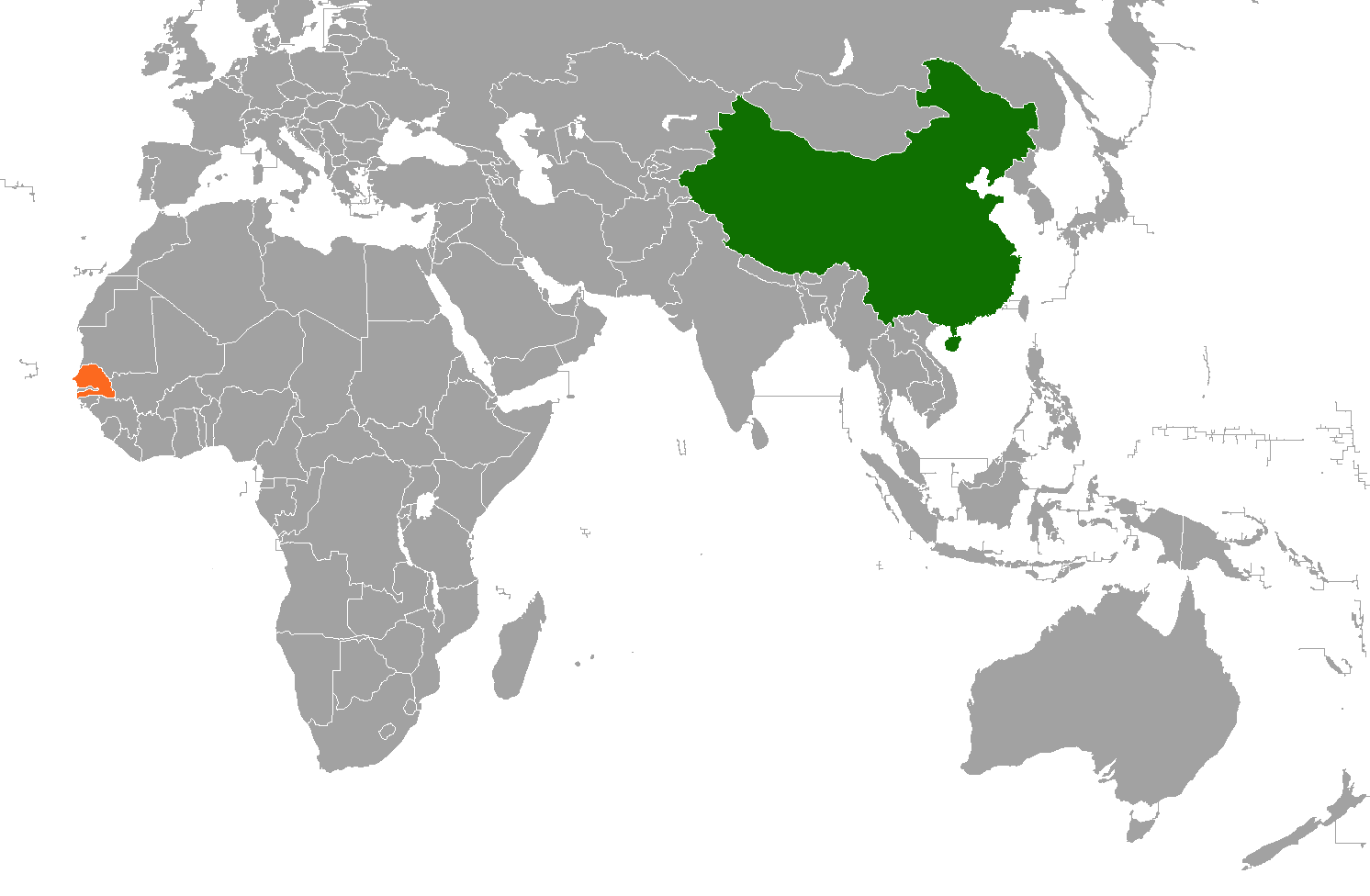
- China: Senegal

China–Senegal relations refer to the foreign relations between China and Senegal.

== History ==
The earliest Chinese engagement in Africa may date back to as early as the tenth century, but modern diplomatic relations between China and Africa began in the mid-1900s. While much of China's growing interest in African countries is linked to natural resource extraction to feed its growing economy, this is not the case for involvement in Senegal, given the country's relatively limited supply of natural resources. China is also looking to accrue international influence by investing and creating infrastructure and markets in Africa, rather than simply giving aid, as Western powers have largely done in the past. For China, Senegal therefore presents an economically strategic location, and an opportunity to establish diplomatic relations in a country that has historically been a force of political stability in the West African region. For Senegal, establishing relations with China has legitimized its role in international affairs, and provided new trade and investment opportunities.

The history of China–Senegal relations has consisted of an alternating Senegalese recognition between the governments of mainland China (PRC) and Taiwan (formerly the ROC). This has largely been a result of Beijing's “One China policy,” in which the PRC required foreign governments to break ties with Taiwan before proceeding in diplomatic relations with the PRC. This trend of alternating recognition was common among many African countries and China during the second half of the twentieth century.

Senegal gained independence in 1960 after formerly existing as a French colony, and in September of the same year, Léopold Sédar Senghor became Senegal's first president. Soon after, Senegal established relations with Taipei, the capital city of Taiwan. In 1961, Senegal recognized the People's Republic of China (PRC), but the PRC was unwilling to maintain this relationship while Senegal still retained ties with Taiwan. President Senghor stated in 1964 that he did not wish to maintain economic ties with Beijing, but oppositionist groups, including the Senegal African Independence Party, a communist party, were in support of retaining a relationship with Beijing at the time.

In 1971, Senegal voted in favor of the PRC joining the United Nations, a motion which passed. Shortly thereafter, on December 7, 1971. Two years later, in 1973, the PRC and Senegal established trade and economic agreements. These relations lasted until January 1996, when Senegal resumed relations with Taipei and the PRC in turn suspended relations with Senegal. The PRC maintained this suspension until October 2005 when the relationship was restored. In August 2016, current Senegalese President Macky Sall attended the G20 summit in Hangzhou as the leader of a guest country, where he met with General Secretary of the Chinese Communist Party Xi Jinping and said he wanted to push for more independent development in Africa (FOCAC).

China has an embassy located in the Senegal's capital, Dakar, and Zhang Xun is the Chinese ambassador to Senegal (Ministry of Foreign Affairs of the PRC). Senegal also has an embassy located in Beijing, and Papa Khalilou Fall is the Senegalese ambassador to the PRC. In 2000, the Forum on China-Africa Cooperation was established to provide a platform through which Chinese officials could meet with officials of several African states.

== Economic relations ==
Since the re-establishment of diplomacy between China and Senegal, economic relations between the two countries have rapidly grown. This is part of a widespread Chinese effort to invest in the continent of Africa. China has pledged to no longer passively enter into trade agreements and give aid, but rather be an active investor in the future of Africa. In December 2015, Chinese leader Xi Jinping pledged $60 billion towards African development projects over the next three years. The amount of aid that China has pledged has more than doubled since 2006. To put the immense amount of Chinese aid in perspective, China's Export-Import Bank extended $62.7 billion in loans to African countries between 2001 and 2010, $12.5 billion more than the World Bank. Chinese involvement in Senegal is strategic given the growth prospects of the country. Senegal is the second fastest growing economy in West Africa and the fourth fastest in Sub-Saharan Africa as a whole. This growth has been propelled by Senegalese government's involvement in specific sectors such as groundnuts, rice and horticultural goods. Additionally, the Port of Dakar is an intersection between Europe, North America, South America and the rest of Africa, and as a result, is one of the largest and most efficient deep-water seaports along the West African coast. The government sentiment and prime location of Senegal make the country an optimal economic partner for a newly minted world power like China which is looking to expand its military, political and economic power across the world in conjunction with other world powers like the European Union and the United States.

Senegal joined the Belt and Road Initiative (BRI) in 2018.

=== Land resources ===
Aside from natural phosphates and a prominent fishing economy, Senegal is not home to many natural resources. However, their reliance on a developed agricultural industry, which employed 75% of the Senegalese working population as of 2013, is crucial. The current program in place involving joint Chinese and Senegalese agricultural research was initially a partnership established between Senegal and Taiwan but then went under Chinese control with the reestablishment of diplomatic relations in 2005. Agricultural and biological research is funded primarily by the Chinese Ministry of Commerce. China's increasing presence on the African continent due to agricultural ventures has been the source of worldwide attraction, especially due to corporate-driven land deals by Chinese businesses, known as “land grabs.” Chinese involvement in Senegal, in particular, was due to an inability to bring in any collaboration efforts from the West according to Former President Abdoulaye Wade. Since the Senegalese government sought to prioritize the development of the country's agricultural industry, and therefore food security for its citizens, international involvement was welcomed by President Wade and his administration. In the beginning, there were many difficulties in the early stages of the project for those participating in the collaboration, due to communication issues, flaws in project designs and overall distrust on both Chinese and Senegalese sides, as crops were not yielding as quickly as predicted leading to frustration on both sides. It seemed that there had not been as much consideration for any socio-cultural education by either party Senegal has since set up a program that which provides over 74,000 acres of land for farming, included with infrastructure for water retention which increases produce yield dramatically. Chinese agriculturalists have also returned to China to implement techniques learned in Senegal to the country's farms and agricultural land. Since land in Senegal, and the continent of Africa overall, is considered mineral-rich and unexploited, in the view of China, Chinese agricultural techniques should be implemented to not only feed China but increase the global supply of food as a whole. Even with this international cooperation, the Senegalese government still prioritized natives over Chinese foreigners when selling and providing land.

=== Trade ===
China is now Senegal's second largest trading partner, second only to the European Union as of 2015. Trade flows between the two countries are unbalanced. Senegal's imports averaged $349 million annually from China, while China imported $26B as Senegalese exports to China tripled between 2000 and 2005. China's top imports from Senegal include raw materials such as ground nuts and their byproducts, and titanium ore. On the other hand, Senegal's top imports from China primarily include technology and infrastructure-related products including telephones, large construction vehicles, steel and delivery trucks The composition of trading goods is a leading indicator of the state of economic relations between the two countries: China as a world economic powerhouse using its resources to invest in Senegal as an up and comer in a rising Africa. The Chinese presence is prominent in trade as Senegal Peche, the largest commercial fishing and shipping enterprise, is now a subsidiary of the China National Fisheries Association, a state-owned multi-national fishing corporation to large infrastructure projects that include building a new international airport in a newly developed urban center to Diamniadio.

=== Senegalese sentiment ===
The economic exchange between the two countries has been largely welcomed by Senegalese citizens and government. In recently conducted surveys, 65 percent Senegalese citizens responded to the question, “Is China’s economic and political influence positive or negative?” with “somewhat positive” or “very positive”. Additionally, when asked about the usefulness of Chinese economic activities in their countries, 54 percent of Senegalese citizens responded Chinese developmental assistance as being “somewhat/very good job” The government favors Chinese presence due to the availability to credit. While there is little official information available about the amount and nature of Chinese investment in Senegal. Through interviews from Senegalese government officials, the Chinese government offers short and long-term loans with the highest interest rates being at two percent, relatively low compared to other funding sources. The option of these loans have improved infrastructure among other projects in Senegal.

=== Long-term investments ===
The majority of China's private business is concentrated in Senegal's capital of Dakar, which has grown so rapidly that Senegal is building a new city funded by China and its CGC Overseas Construction Group. The new infrastructure project is a response to increasing prices which have pushed out the middle class. The new city has a new highway connecting the new city of Diamniadio and the capital of Dakar and plans for a new international airport. Diamniadio currently has a population of 30,000, but it is expected to expand tenfold by 2019 as a result of this project. China's investment Senegal is not limited to financing the large infrastructure projects, but also skills-training. As Chinese construction companies have sprung up in the country, training schools have risen alongside building the skills capacity in the country. Like many Chinese economic phenomena, this is not unique to Senegal. At the 2017 African Development Week, executive secretary of the African Capacity Building Foundation, Emmanuel Nnadoize, noted the importance of Chinese-led skills training on the continent.

== Sovereignty issues ==
Senegal follows the one China principle. It recognizes the People's Republic of China as the sole government of China and Taiwan as an integral part of China's territory, and supports all efforts by the PRC to "achieve national reunification". It also considers Hong Kong, Xinjiang and Tibet to be China's internal affairs.

== Chinese military involvement in Senegal ==
In 2006, former President Abdoulaye Wade went to Beijing and, later in the year, attended the FOCAC (The Forum on China-Africa Cooperation) summit where senior Chinese military officials began to discuss a track for military cooperation with Senegal. These discussions occurred just one year after Senegal re-established diplomatic relations with China. Since then, Senegal has partnered with Chinese forces in multiple areas, including training exercises and material and equipment acquisition. In 2007, China also provided ambulances and trucks, as well as communication and mining equipment. At the time, the Chinese ambassador to Senegal added that the cooperation between the two nations gave way for assisting Senegal in their peacekeeping missions, most notably in Darfur, Sudan, the Ivory Coast and the Democratic Republic of Congo. These partnerships have helped the Senegalese armed forces to gain higher levels of experience, professionalism, responsibility and respect towards and for the country's population, regardless of its extent compared to military collaborations between the United States or France. The most recent showcasing of equipment was a large delivery of armored vehicles to Senegal. Going with China's involvement in Africa to develop an international presence, providing aid to the Senegalese military mutually benefits both parties: Senegal can better and increase their military power while China has yet another foothold in the region. China is also able to portray itself both as a military power and humanitarian within the parameters of African politics.

== Social and race relations ==
Though diplomatic and economic relations between China and Senegal were first established in 1971, Chinese migrants did not begin arriving in Senegal until the 1980s. Many of these migrants came as workers under Henan Construction Company, which was one of the main multinational companies involved in the Chinese-funded infrastructure development projects in Senegal. Once their contracts ended in the late 1990s, workers who stayed behind began to take advantage of other business opportunities available to them, namely in trade. While residing in Senegal, many Henan workers noticed that Senegalese traders in Dakar's markets were selling cheaper Chinese-made products. With their connections back home, they realized that they could do the same by importing at an even lower cost and subsequently, gain higher profits than those being earned by Senegalese traders. Therefore, these first Chinese traders rented out store space in the Centenaire area of Dakar, where the devaluation of the CFA francs (the primary currency used in Senegal) in the 90s forced many Centenaire residents to rent out their properties for an extra stream of income. To this day, Chinese retail businesses remain primarily situated around the Centenaire's Papa Gueye Fall Avenue and Boulevard General De Gaulle. The continuing migration of Chinese citizens into the area has led to the development of a Chinatown within Dakar, which, as of 2009, had around 200 Chinese shops, restaurants, and other Chinese-owned businesses.

=== Demographics of Chinese nationals in Senegal ===
In 2004, there was an estimated 300 Chinese in Senegal. Following the 2005 renewal of diplomatic relations, Chinese migration into Senegal increased, facilitated by expedited visas courtesy of unofficial networks between Senegalese brokers, the Senegalese Ministry of the Interior, and the Senegalese embassy in Beijing. Furthermore, passports in China, though previously extremely limited and dependent upon administrative rank, are now more readily available since China started simplifying passport regulations starting in the 1980s. This process included a 1985 law that allowed ordinary citizens to apply for passports, provided they could show evidence of sponsorship from abroad. Following international standards as set by the World Trade Organization, in 2005 China allowed any citizen to apply for a passport by providing identification and residence documents. The first Chinese migrants to Senegal began arriving in the mid-1990s., when the government made changes in the necessary procedures for getting a Chinese passport to travel to Africa. This expanded to the groups for whom it was possible to obtain such a passport, making it available for people other than just scholars and people with family already settled there.

By 2008, the estimate of Chinese nationals in Senegal increased to around 1,000 in Dakar alone, with more continuing to enter the country in pursuit of business opportunities. The majority of these migrants are traders and entrepreneurs who are looking to tap into Senegalese demand for cheaper Chinese goods. Due to the fact that many Chinese migrants come for only short periods of time and then either return to China or pursue ventures in other African countries, the constant inflow and outflow makes it very difficult to keep track of the long-term population level of Chinese in Senegal Estimates of the current population vary widely, from the Chinese embassy's count of approximately 2000 to UNACOIS's (National Union of Senegalese Retailers and Industrialists) estimate of more than 5000 Currently, the largest portion of Chinese traders in Senegal originate from Henan province, comprising approximately 60% of the Chinese traders’ community. Other provinces that Chinese nationals residing in Senegal originate from include Sichuan, Fujian, and Zhejiang. Most of these migrants are from rural areas with low socioeconomic status, limited educational backgrounds, and little work experience. Of this population, single men in their late 20s to early 30s are the predominant demographic, followed by slightly older married men who often bring their wives and families with them. Some traders who came in the early 2000s have expanded into other fields such as catering and agriculture, but most remain as shopkeepers who work under the 1st wave of Chinese shop owners from the late 1990s that helped bring them into the country in the first place.

=== Race relations ===
Race relations between Chinese residents and Senegalese locals vary, largely on the basis of the environment in which they interact. To the Senegalese residents who rent out garages and living spaces to Chinese migrants at inflated prices, the Chinese presence is a reassurance of economic security in the face of personal debts generated by the depreciation of the CFA francs in the 1990s. In addition to the stream of income they provide in the form of rent, the generally reserved and discreet attitudes of Chinese residents make them appealing tenants to Senegalese proprietors. For Senegalese consumers, the arrival of Chinese merchants and resulting influx of cheap consumer goods has driven down prices and increased their purchasing power. Though these goods are typically of lower-quality, their affordability continues to attract Senegalese consumers and generally keep them happy or indifferent to the presence of Chinese traders.

On the other hand, Senegalese merchants in direct competition with Chinese traders have understandably become increasingly suspicious and hostile towards Chinese residents. Competition remains fierce and Chinese merchants have driven many of their Senegalese counterparts out of business with their “dumping strategy” of cheaper prices and higher volumes of consumer goods. Aware of the often unregulated means through which Chinese merchants bring their products into Senegal, protests against Chinese traders rose and culminated in a major strike in 2004 against Chinese products led by UNACOIS. Many Senegalese-run shops were closed and some Chinese shops were attacked in protest against Chinese retailers and their products. Since the strike, tensions have remained high as the Senegalese government has taken little to no action to tighten entry requirements against Chinese migrants and verify the validity of Chinese business contracts within Senegal. During the 2012 Senegalese presidential elections, these political frustrations reflected in the burning of three Chinese stores. Amongst Senegalese business owners and traders, current perception of Chinese traders in Senegal is generally based on strong anti-Chinese sentiments. Due to the high visibility of Chinese business owners, especially in urban districts where customers are the most readily available, this sentiment has been able to develop. Furthermore, the Chinese community, much like in other African countries where the Chinese presence has increased, has reflected an insular nature that has delayed the integration of the community into Senegalese society.

=== Media portrayal ===
Through media sources such as China Radio International, Chinese journalists have already made a presence in Senegal. With the continued development of the Sino-African relationship, Chinese leadership have attempted to create a more positive image of China in Africa. Western media has largely portrayed China's involvements in Africa as exploitative in nature; Chinese media is trying to shift views towards one of an economic ally. As a result, within Chinese-run media, Senegalese locals are often seen or portrayed by the media as ignorant, furthering the role of China as one of a socio-economic developer. The emphasis is placed on how the Chinese presence in Senegal has brought technology, know-how, and other management strategies.

Senegalese media's portrayal of Chinese is reflective of overall portrayal of Chinese migrants in African media. Despite the growing development of Chinese and African economic relations, there is still very little written about the daily interactions between Chinese and African people in Africa. Present-day media depictions of Chinese residents in Africa has often been increasingly negative due to the economic competition they bring against local businessmen. In general, opposition political parties and civil society organizations representing the interest of local traders have pushed anti-Chinese rhetoric in media and Chinese in Africa are becoming targets of increasingly anti-Chinese sentiments amongst local merchants. Specifically, many Senegalese media sources often exaggerate the number of Chinese residents in Senegal to stir up fear of Chinese competition and thus anti-Chinese sentiment. Lack of cultural knowledge and personal interactions with the closed-off Chinese community has perpetuated the Senegalese media's vague portrayal. Recently, however, the Chinese and Senegalese governments have made joint efforts to try and increase dialogue between the two cultures through endeavors such as the 2014 creation of the China Cultural Center in Dakar.
