= Chinese St. Louis =

2004 non-fiction book by Huping Ling

Chinese St. Louis: From Enclave to Cultural Community is a 2004 non-fiction book by Huping Ling, published by Temple University Press.

Ling argued that the Chinese of St. Louis focused on, in Ling's words, "maintaining and preserving its cultural heritage" as it no longer has a particular place in the metropolitan area where it is concentrated; Haiming Liu of California State Polytechnic University took that statement and argued that it shows that a "flexible social network" is how, by the 2000s, many Chinese American groups are characterized. Shehong Chen of the University of Massachusetts, Lowell stated that the author uses "ample facts" to support that assertion.

== Contents ==
The time period 1870s-1960s is covered in the initial part of the book, while the remainder covers subsequent periods.

The work includes a literature review of the subject.

== Reception ==
Hong Cheng (Chinese: 程洪; pinyin: Chéng Hóng) of University of California, Los Angeles argued that other ethnic groups in the U.S. had the same de-centralization process, and that even some ethnic groups of European origin had held onto ethnic enclaves while some Chinese communities increasingly lost theirs. Cheng argued that Ling could show a unique Chinese American model if she explains the implications of China-United States relations on Chinese Americans.

Haiming Liu stated that the work "is an important contribution" to its general content area.

Marie Rose Wong of Seattle University concluded that the book is "a notable and much needed addition".

== See also ==
- Chinese Chicago - Another book by Ling
