= Huping Ling =

Chinese American academic

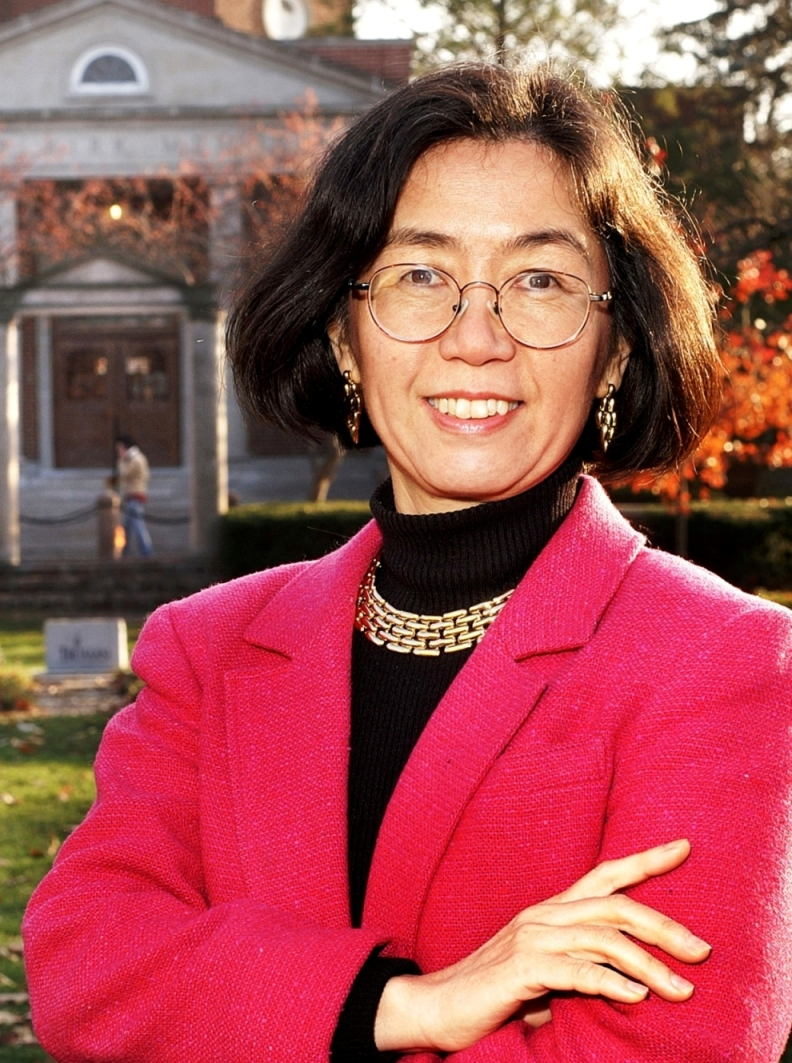
- Huping Ling in 2006
- Born: 1956 (age 69–70)
- Education: Shanxi University (BA); University of Oregon (MA); Miami University (Ph.D)
- Occupations: Professor, author
- Employer: Truman State University
- Known for: Asian American studies

Huping Ling (Chinese: 令狐萍; pinyin: Lìng Húpíng; born 1956) is a Chinese American academic. She is a professor of history and past department chair at Truman State University in Kirksville, Missouri, where she founded the Asian studies program. She is the recipient of a 2024 Lifetime Achievement Award from the Association for Asian American Studies. She is a visiting fellow at the Hoover Institution at Stanford University, the Changjiang Scholar Chair Professor of the Chinese Ministry of Education, a distinguished honorary professor at Lishui University, and a visiting professor of the Institute of Overseas Chinese Studies at Jinan University. She is the funding and inaugural book series editor for Asian American Studies Today for Rutgers University Press, is on the editorial board of Overseas Chinese History Study for the Overseas Chinese History Research Institution in Beijing, and served as the executive editor-in-chief for the Journal of Asian American Studies (2008-2012). She is also on the board of directors of the Chinese Historical Society of Overseas Chinese Studies and serves as a consultant to the Overseas Chinese Affairs Office of Guangdong Provincial Government.

Her research focuses on Asian American studies, including immigration and ethnicity, assimilation and adaptation, transnationalism, family and marriage, feminism, employment patterns, and community structures. A Ford Foundation prize-winning author, she has published 35 books and more than 200 articles on Asian American studies.

== Education and career ==
Ling began her career as a high school teacher in Taiyuan, Shanxi, China, from 1974 through 1978. In 1982, she graduated from Taiyuan's Shanxi University with a bachelor's degree in history. From 1982-85, she worked as an assistant professor of history at Shanxi University. In 1985, she was a visiting scholar at the history department at Georgetown University. She earned her master's in 1987 at the University of Oregon, and completed her Ph.D at Miami University in 1991. She began teaching as an assistant professor of history at Truman State University from 1991-1995. In 1996, she became associate professor of history and full professor in 2004.

She is a visiting professor with the Institute of Overseas Chinese Studies at Jinan University in Guangzhou, China. She is the Changjiang Scholar Chair Professor by the Chinese Ministry of Education at the Wuhan Theoretical Research Center of the Overseas Chinese Affairs Office of the State Council and China Central Normal University.

She also serves as consultant to the Overseas Chinese Affairs Office of Guangdong Provincial Government, consultant and member of the Board of Directors for the Female Writers Association in Shanxi of the Chinese National Writers Association, and executive editor of the Journal of Asian American Studies. For the Association for Asian American Studies, she served as the Board Director and Representative of the Midwest/Mountain/Canada Region from 2001-2003. Since 1999, she has been part of the Steering Committee as a History Caucus.

She is the inaugural editor of Rutgers University Press book series Asian American Studies Today. She has been a reviewer for The Choice, the Journal of Urban History, the International Migration Review, the Journal of American Ethnic History, The Journal of American History, the Journal of the History of Sexuality, the University of Hawaii Press, and Prentice Hall. In 2004, she served on the Book Award Committee for the 46th Missouri Conference on History.

== Selected lectures and interviews ==
- Keynote speech, Inclusion Talk Series (AANHPI): “Asian American History: Race, Transnational Migration and Community”, May 28, 2024.
- Author event sponsored by the United States Heartland China Association (USHCA) and Chinese American Museum of Chicago (COMOC), February 7, 2024.
- “New Theory in Chinese American Studies”, China Central Normal University, May 17, 2023.
- PBS interview, “Curious Columbus: Why Is There No Chinatown in Columbus?”, WOSU Public Media, May 4, 2023.
- STL History Live "Myth & Reality of 'Hop Alley': The Chinese American Community in St. Louis", Missouri Historical Society, May 26, 2020.
- “Chinese Chicago: Race, Transnational Migration, and Community since 1870”, Chinese American Museum of Chicago, February 12, 2012.
- Interview, "Chinese Community in St. Louis", 90.7 KWMU, July 5, 2005.

== Selected publications ==
=== Books ===
==== Author ====
- Surviving on the Gold Mountain: A History of Chinese American Women and Their Lives Albany: State University of New York Press, 1998.
- Jinshan Yao: A History of Chinese American Women. Beijing: Chinese Social Sciences Publishing House, 1999.
  - Revised and expanded edition in traditional Chinese. In the series Showwe Literature and Philosophy. Taipei: Showwe Information, 2015.
- Ping Piao Mei Guo: New Immigrants in America. Shanxi: Beiyue Literature and Art Publishing House, 2003.
  - Revised and expanded edition in traditional Chinese. Taipei: Showwe Information, 2021.
- Chinese St. Louis: From Enclave to Cultural Community. Philadelphia: Temple University Press, 2004.
- Voices of the Heart: Asian American Women on Immigration, Work, and Family. Truman State University Press, 2007.
- Chinese Chicago: Race, Transnational Migration, and Community since 1870. Stanford University Press, 2012.
  - Chinese edition. Guangzhou: World Books Publishing House, 2015.
- A Complete History of Chinese in America. Beijing: Chinese Overseas Press, 2017.
- Chinese Americans in the Heartland: Migration, Work, and Community. Rutgers University Press, 2022.
- Asian American History. Rutgers University Press, 2023.

==== Editor ====
- Emerging Voices: Experiences of Underrepresented Asian Americans. Rutgers University Press, 2008.
- Asian America: Forming New Communities, Expanding Boundaries. Rutgers University Press, 2009.
- Asian American History and Cultures: An Encyclopedia. Two volumes (with Allan W. Austin). M. E. Sharpe, 2010.
  - Chinese edition. Guangzhou: World Books Publishing House, 2016.

=== Articles and book chapters ===
- “Surviving on the Gold Mountain: A Review of Sources about Chinese American Women.” The History Teacher. Vol. 26, no. 4 (August 1993): 459-470.
- “Chinese Merchant Wives in the United States: 1840-1945.” In Origins and Destinations. Chinese Historical Society of Southern California/UCLA Asian American Studies Center, 1994.
- “Sze-Kew Dun, A Chinese-American Woman in Kirksville.” Missouri Historical Review. Vol. 91 (October 1996): 35-51.
- “A History of Chinese Female Students in the United States, 1880s-1990s.” Journal of American Ethnic History. Vol.16, no.3 (Spring 1997): 81-109.
- “Family and Marriage of Late-Nineteenth and Early-Twentieth Century Chinese Immigrant Women.” Journal of American Ethnic History. Vol. 19, no. 2 (Winter 2000): 43-63.
- “Historiography and Research Methodologies of Chinese American Women.” Research on Women in Modern Chinese History. No. 9 (August 2001): 235-253.
- “Hop Alley: Myth and Reality of the St. Louis Chinatown, 1860s-1930s.” Journal of Urban History. Vol. 28, no.2 (January 2002): 184-219.
- “The Rise and Fall of the Study in America Movement in Taiwan.” Overseas Chinese History Studies. No. 4 (2003): 21-28.
- “Governing ‘Hop Alley:’ On Leong Chinese Merchants and Laborers Association, 1906-1966.” Journal of American Ethnic History. Vol. 23, no. 2 (Winter 2004): 50-84.
- “Growing up in ‘Hop Alley:’ The Chinese American Youth in St. Louis during the Early-Twentieth Century.” In Asian American Children, edited by Benson Tong. Westport, Connecticut: Greenwood Press, 2004.
- “Reconceptualizing Chinese American Community in St. Louis: From Chinatown to Cultural Community.” Journal of American Ethnic History. Vol. 24, no. 2 (Winter 2005): 65-101.
- “New Perspectives on Chinese American Studies: Cultural Community Theory.” Overseas Chinese History Studies. No.1 (2007): 25-31.
- “The Changing Public Image of Chinese Americans and the Rise of China.” Urban China. No. 23 (2007): 75-79.
- "Chinese Chicago: Transnational Migration and Businesses, 1890s-1930s." Journal of Chinese Overseas. Vol. 6 (2010): 250-285.
- "Chinese Immigrants." In Encyclopedia of the American Immigration, edited by R. Kent Rasmussen. Salem Press, 2010.
- "Chinese-American women." In Women in American History: An Encyclopedia, edited by Hasia R. Diner. Facts on File, 2011.
- "The Changing Public Image of Chinese Americans and the Rise of China." 21st Century International Review (March 2011): 10-15.
- "The Transnational World of Chinese Entrepreneurs in Chicago, 1870s to 1940s: New Sources and Perspectives on Southern Chinese Emigration." Frontier History in China. Vol.6, no.3 (2011): 370-406.
- "Asian Americans in Missouri." In Asian America: A State by State Historical Encyclopedia, edited by Jun Xing. Greenwood Press, 2012.
- “Negotiating Transnational Migration: Marriage and Changing Gender Roles among the Chinese Diaspora.” In Routledge Handbook of the Chinese Diaspora, edited by Chee-Beng Tan. Routledge, 2013.
- “The New Trends in American Chinatowns: The Case of Chinese in Chicago.” In Chinatowns around the World: Gilded Ghettos, Ethnopolis, and Cultural Diaspora, edited by Bernard Wong and Chee-Beng Tan. Leiden: Brill, 2013.
- “Rise of China and Its Meaning to Asian Americans.” American Review of China Studies. Vol. 14, no. 1 (Spring 2013): 1-23.
- “Chinese Chicago: Transnational Migration and Entrepreneurship, 1870s-1930s.” Overseas Chinese History Studies. No. 3 (2013): 1-18.
- “A History of the Chinese Female Students in the U.S.” In New Perspectives on the History of Women's Education in the United States, edited by Margaret Nash. Palgrave Press, 2017.
- “The Chinese American Studies: Theories, Approaches, Challenges and Potentials.” International Journal of Diasporic Chinese Studies. Vol. 10, no.1 (June 2018): 81-110.
- “New Millennial Study Abroad Wave: An Analysis and Evaluation.” Shenzheng University Journal of Social Sciences. Vol. 36, no. 1 (January 2019): 1-9.
- “The Overseas Chinese Community Organizations: Zhonghua Huiguan and On Leong, 1850s-1960s.” International Journal of Diasporic Chinese Studies (June 2023): 1-20.

== Honors ==
- 1999: Ford Foundation Book Award.
- 2004: Golden Apple Award from the Order of Omega and Truman State University's Greek Community.
- 2006: Walker and Doris Allen Fellowship from Truman State University.
- 2006: Best Article Award from the Missouri Conference on History.
- 2010: Editors' Choice Award from Booklist and the Reference Books Bulletin.
- 2012-2015: Changjiang Scholar Chair Professor from the Chinese Ministry of Education.
- 2016-2018: Visiting Fellow of the Hoover Institution at Stanford University.
- 2024: Lifetime Achievement Award from the Association for Asian American Studies.

== Public appearances ==
Ling has been featured on WOSU-FM, World Journal, Chicago Daily Herald, The Dallas Morning News, West End Word, St. Louis Post-Dispatch, St. Louis Chinese American News, the Riverfront Times, the Charles Brennan Show, and St. Louis Public Radio, among others. She has also been included in books and encyclopedias on famous Chinese Americans and authors. She is frequently invited to lecture on Asian cultures and Asian American experiences at conferences, universities, schools, libraries, government and private agencies, and community organizations, nationally and internationally.

== See also ==
- History of Chinese Americans in St. Louis
- Journal of Asian American Studies
- History of Chinese Americans in Chicago
- List of Truman State University people
