= Mario Azevedo =

Mozambican historian (born 1940)

Mario Joaquim Azevedo (born 1940) is a Mozambican novelist, historian, professor, and epidemiologist.

A refugee, Azevedo, esteemed as one of the most remarkable Mozambican voices during the years of the War of Independence from Portugal, emigrated from his native country to the United States, where he received his B.A. from The Catholic University of America, his M.A., his Ph.D. from Duke University, from American University, and his M.P.H from the University of North Carolina at Chapel Hill.

In 1980 he became associate professor of history at Jackson State University; he passed in 1986 to the UNC Charlotte, where he has become Frank Porter Graham Professor and Chair of the Department of African-American and African Studies.

Azevedo was co-coordinator of the Southeastern Regional Seminar in Africa Studies from 1987 to 1989.

== Works ==
- The Returning Hunter, 1978
- Africa and Its People: An Interdisciplinary Survey of the Continent (editor), 1982
- Cameroon and Its National Character (editor), 1984
- Cameroon and Chad in Historical and Contemporary Perspectives (editor), 1989
- Historical Dictionary of Mozambique, 1991
- Kenya: The Land, the People, and the Nation (editor), 1993
- Africana Studies: A Survey of Africa and the African Diaspora (editor), 1993
- Chad: A Nation in Search of Its Future (co-authored with Emmanuel U. Nnadozie), 1997
- Roots of Violence: History of War in Chad, 1998
- Tragedy and Triumph: Mozambique Refugees in Southern Africa, 1977-2001, 2002
