= Chinese Chicago =

2012 book by Huping Ling

Chinese Chicago: Race, Transnational Migration, and Community since 1870 is a 2012 book by Huping Ling, published by Stanford University Press. It discusses the Chinese in Chicago.

The primary thesis of the book is that the Chinese immigration to Chicago is transnational.

Charlotte Brooks of Baruch College stated that the book has more emphasis on immigration in the early 20th century and less emphasis on subsequent immigration.

Philip Q. Yang of Texas Woman's University described it as "the most complete history of Chinese in Chicago".

Wing-kai To of Bridgewater State University wrote that the work's synthesis of various topics makes the book "go beyond" the "classic studies" in the field.

== Background ==
Ling conducted research for over 10 years. She consulted genealogical documents, interviews, magazines, and newspapers. She specifically consulted the University of Chicago Ernest Burgess Papers and Immigration and Naturalization Service documents. She also consulted two museums, the Chinese-American Museum of Chicago and the Chinese American Museum. She also used Chinese language documents in addition to documents in English.

== Contents ==
In the original English version, there is an introduction, and then seven content chapters, and then an ending chapter. The chapters are in chronological order by time period. According to James Zarsadiaz of Northwestern University, the content about life before 1965 makes up "a hefty portion of the book", and that the portions about periods post-1965 use a "sociological" "narrative tone".

Toisan (Taishan) and immigration from there to Chicago are described in the first chapter. The initial Chinatown in the Chicago Loop and the moving to the current Chinatown, Chicago in Armour Square are the topics of the second chapter. To wrote that, due to the overlap of topics, the first two chapters "could actually be combined into one". The businesses of the Chinatowns are described in Chapter 3. Family lives are discussed in the fourth chapter. Ethnic organizations are described in the fifth chapter. The academic community of Chinese origins is discussed in Chapter 6. West Argyle Street Historic District (a new Chinatown in Uptown Chicago) is discussed in Chapter 7, and that chapter also compares different generations of Chinese immigrants, as well as the differences between the Armour Square and Uptown Chinatowns. The final chapter describes how new migrants from the Chinese interior came to the coastal Chinese cities that Chinese Americans originated from.

Images of artwork, figures, maps, photographs, and tables are present in Chinese Chicago.

== Release ==
It was translated into Chinese as 芝加哥的华人: 1870年以来的种族、跨国移民和社区, published by World Publishing Corporation (世界图书出版公司).

== Reception ==
Brooks overall praised the original English version of the book, describing it as "thoroughly researched" and a "comprehensive portrait" reflecting an "attention to detail". According to Brooks, the book could have shown how Chicago's development in the 20th century affected tensions between racial groups and that it does not show how aspects differed among time periods.

Julia María Schiavone Camacho, an independent scholar, stated that the book is "informative and fascinating".

Kathryn E. Wilson of Georgia State University stated that the work "is particularly strong in" showing how Chicago affected Chinese immigrants, and that there were both benefits and drawbacks of the work's expansive scope.

To wrote that the work is "a rich historical portrait".

Yang also praised the book, describing it as "sophisticated and engaging", and stated that its uniqueness is from its exploration of transnationalism.

Zarsadiaz, citing how relatively little sourcing was present regarding ethnic Chinese in the region, described the book as "a scholarly tour de force".

Zhiheng Zhang of the WLCNZ Institute in Auckland, New Zealand wrote that the book "is worth having as a valuable reference."

== See also ==
- Chinese St. Louis - Another book by Ling
