= St. Louis Modern Chinese School =

School in Missouri, United States

Coordinates: 38°38′04″N 90°19′02″W

- Chinese: 圣路易现代中文学校/ 聖路易現代中文學校

Information
- Established: 1997; 29 years ago

The St. Louis Modern Chinese School (SLMCS, simplified Chinese: 圣路易现代中文学校; traditional Chinese: 聖路易現代中文學校; pinyin: Shènglùyì Xiàndài Zhōngwén Xuéxiào) is an American school that teaches Chinese as a second language and Chinese culture. The school is located in the Esquire Building at 6710 Clayton Road in Richmond Heights, Missouri, a suburb of St. Louis.

Founded in 1997 by Chinese Americans of the Mainland China-origin community, the St. Louis Modern Chinese School is a family-oriented non-profit school that is financially supported by volunteers, public donations, and tuition. Students at SLMCS learn about Chinese language and culture, leadership, and responsible citizenship. Students are encouraged to learn about globalization and cultural diversity.

Students perform Chinese Kung Fu at the University of Missouri–St. Louis in December 2005.

Beginning with 40 students, the St. Louis Modern Chinese School had several hundred students within a decade and more than 700 at two decades. In 2017, teachers said most of the parents appeared to be first-generation Chinese immigrants. During the COVID-19 pandemic, enrollment fell by one-third. Still, the school raised nearly $100,000 for COVID-19 relief for the metro area and hosted a Stop Asian Hate rally. In 2022, KSDK described it as "a thriving center supported by nearly a thousand families across the St. Louis metro area."

SLMCS is an active member of Chinese School Association in the United States (CSAUS), which has about 150 member schools and more than 20,000 enrolled students.

Electives offered by SLMCS began with dance, waist drum, and arts and crafts. Others were added over the years, including martial arts, math, and an essay class whose finished works were published in the Chinese newspapers in St. Louis. Other classes prepare students for SAT II Math Subject Tests and math contests such as MathCounts, to which SLMCS sent a team of students in 2005 and 2006. In 2006, the SLMCS team won 1st place but was unable to go on to State MathCounts because the school was not a Monday-Friday school.

St. Louis Modern Chinese School promotes Chinese culture throughout the St. Louis area. SLMCS sets up performances of fan dancing and Chinese Gong Fu and other activities at the University of Missouri–St. Louis, the Missouri Botanical Garden, and various other locations. SLMCS also hosts a Christmas Gala every year featuring performances by students.

== See also ==
- Chinese in St. Louis
