= Busch Memorial Stadium =

Stadium in St. Louis, Missouri (1966–2005)

- Busch Stadium II; Baseball Heaven
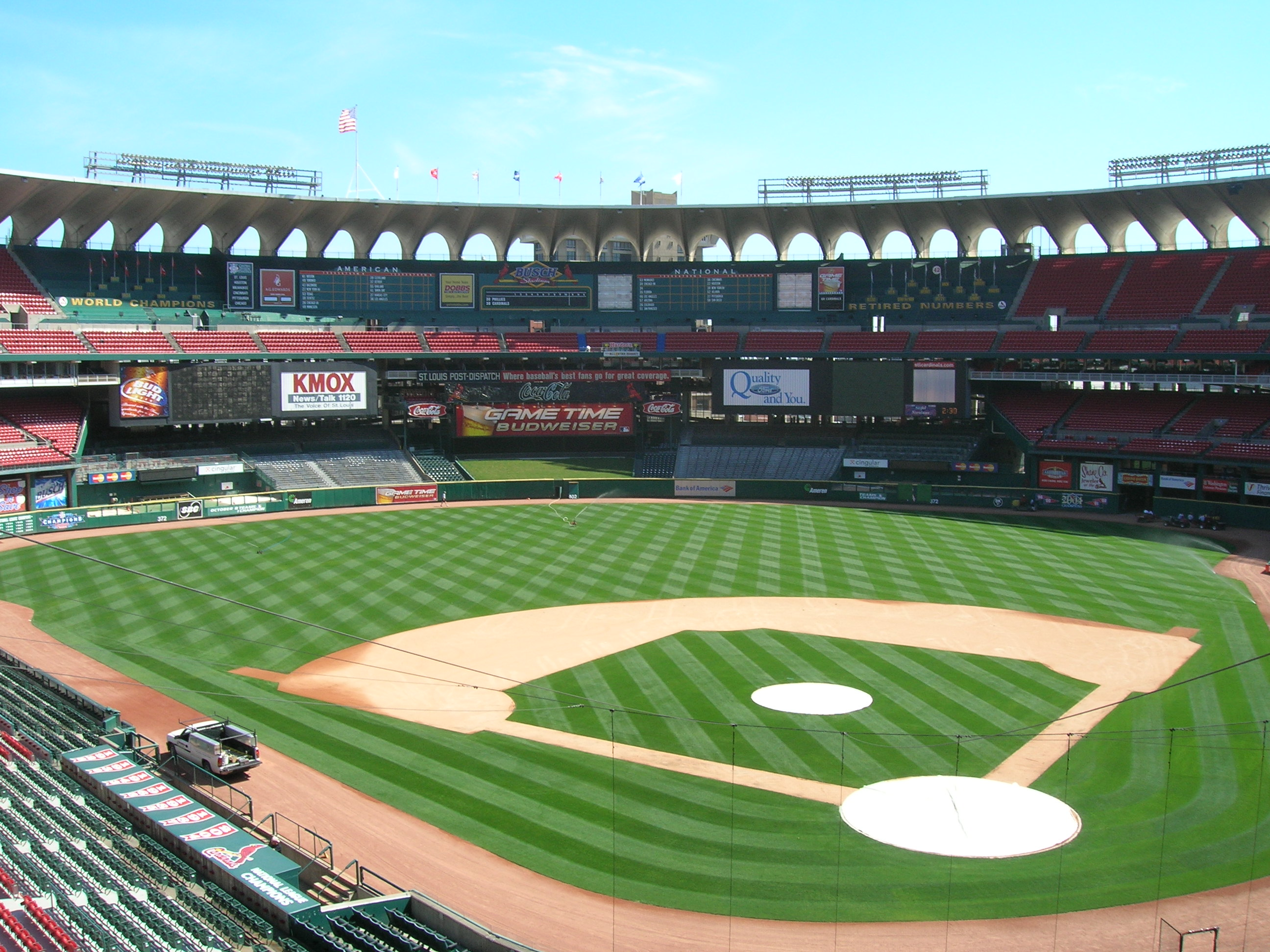
- Busch Memorial Stadium in 2005
- Interactive map of Busch Memorial Stadium
- Former names: Civic Center Busch Memorial Stadium (1966–1981); Busch Stadium (1982–2005)
- Location: 250 Stadium Plaza; St. Louis, Missouri
- Coordinates: 38°37′26″N 90°11′33″W
- Owner: St. Louis Cardinals
- Operator: St. Louis Cardinals
- Capacity: Baseball: 49,676 (1997–2005); 57,676 (1966–1996); Football: 60,000
- Surface: Natural grass (1996–2005); AstroTurf (1970–1995); Natural grass (1966–1969)
- Field size: Original Dimensions (1966); Left Field – 330 ft (101 m); Left-Center – 386 ft (118 m); Center Field – 414 ft (126 m); Right-Center – 386 ft (118 m); Right Field – 330 ft (101 m); Backstop – 64 ft (20 m) 1996; Left Field – 330 ft (101 m); Left-Center – 372 ft (113 m); Center Field – 402 ft (123 m); Right-Center – 372 ft (113 m); Right Field – 330 ft (101 m); Backstop – 64 ft (20 m)

Construction
- Groundbreaking: May 25, 1964; 62 years ago
- Built: 1964–1966
- Opened: May 12, 1966; 60 years ago
- Closed: October 19, 2005; 21 years ago
- Demolished: November 7 – December 8, 2005
- Cost: US$24 million ($238 million in 2025 dollars)
- Architects: Sverdrup & Parcel; Edward Durell Stone; Schwarz & Van Hoefen, Associated
- General contractor: Fruin–Colnon/Millstone

Tenants
- St. Louis Cardinals (MLB) (1966–2005); St. Louis Cardinals (NFL) (1966–1987); St. Louis Stars (NPSL / NASL) (1967–1974, 1977); St. Louis Rams (NFL) (1995)

Busch Memorial Stadium (Busch Stadium II) was a multi-purpose sports facility in St. Louis, Missouri, that operated for 40 years, from 1966 through 2005. Built as Civic Center Busch Memorial Stadium, its official name was shortened to Busch Stadium in January 1982.

The stadium served as the home of the St. Louis Cardinals National League baseball team for its entire operating existence, while also serving as home to the National Football League's Cardinals team for 22 seasons, from 1966 through 1987, as well as the St. Louis Rams during part of the 1995 season. It opened four days after the last baseball game was played at Sportsman's Park (which had been renamed Busch Stadium in 1953, when Anheuser-Busch bought the team). The St. Louis Stars of the NPSL and later NASL played at the stadium from 1967 to 1974; the team later used the stadium for select matches up through the 1977 season.

The stadium was designed by Sverdrup & Parcel and built by Grün & Bilfinger. Edward Durell Stone designed the roof, a 96-arch "Crown of Arches". The Crown echoed the Gateway Arch, which had been completed only a year before Busch Stadium opened. Otherwise, it was very similar in appearance to other circular multipurpose "cookie-cutter stadiums" built in the 1960s and early 1970s in Atlanta, Cincinnati, and Pittsburgh, all of which were essentially open-air copies of the Houston Astrodome.

Its final event was the sixth game of the 2005 National League Championship Series on October 19. The stadium was demolished by wrecking ball in late 2005 and part of its former footprint is occupied by its replacement—the new Busch Stadium (a.k.a. Busch Stadium III), located to its south.

== History ==
=== Background ===
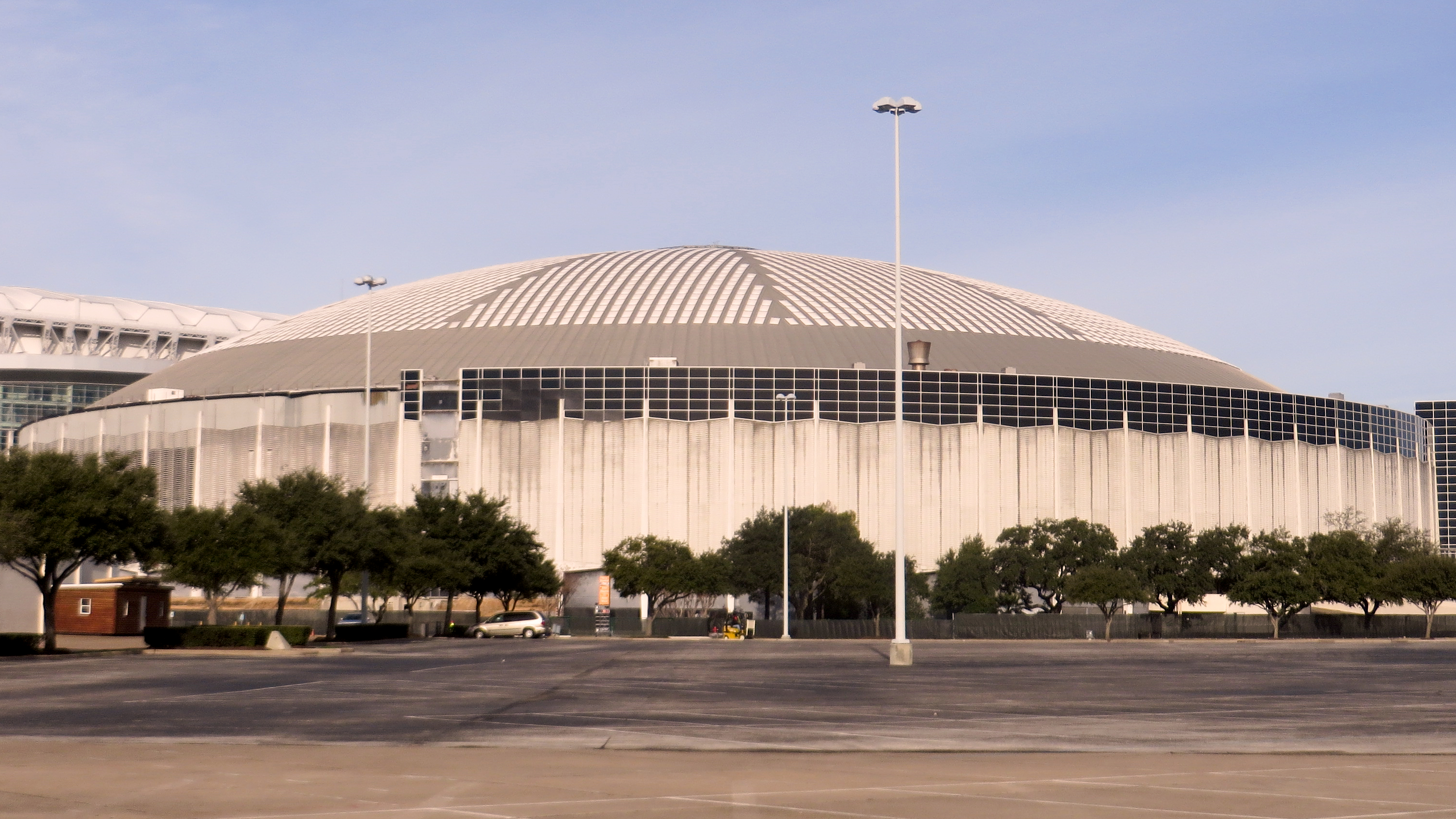
Houston Astrodome

With new stadiums such as the Astrodome and Shea Stadium, St. Louis felt the need to modernize. Many of these stadiums demonstrated modern feats of engineering and architecture, but also demonstrated a transition occurring for the American public at the time—traditional to the cutting edge. At the time of design, the Busch Stadium II was planned to be used for several purposes. The stadium was named Civic Center Busch Memorial Stadium. Just weeks after opening, the new stadium hosted the All-Star Game, followed by a performance by The Beatles. The landmark that distinguishes St. Louis' skyline, the Gateway Arch, was built across the street. To complement this historic landmark, the new stadium had 96 open arches on its roof. As a testament to the design, Busch was one of the last built in the 1960s to be torn down. After serving the St. Louis Cardinals for 40 seasons, it was torn down in 2005.

=== Construction ===
The baseball Cardinals had played at Sportsman's Park since 1920, originally as tenants of the St. Louis Browns of the American League.

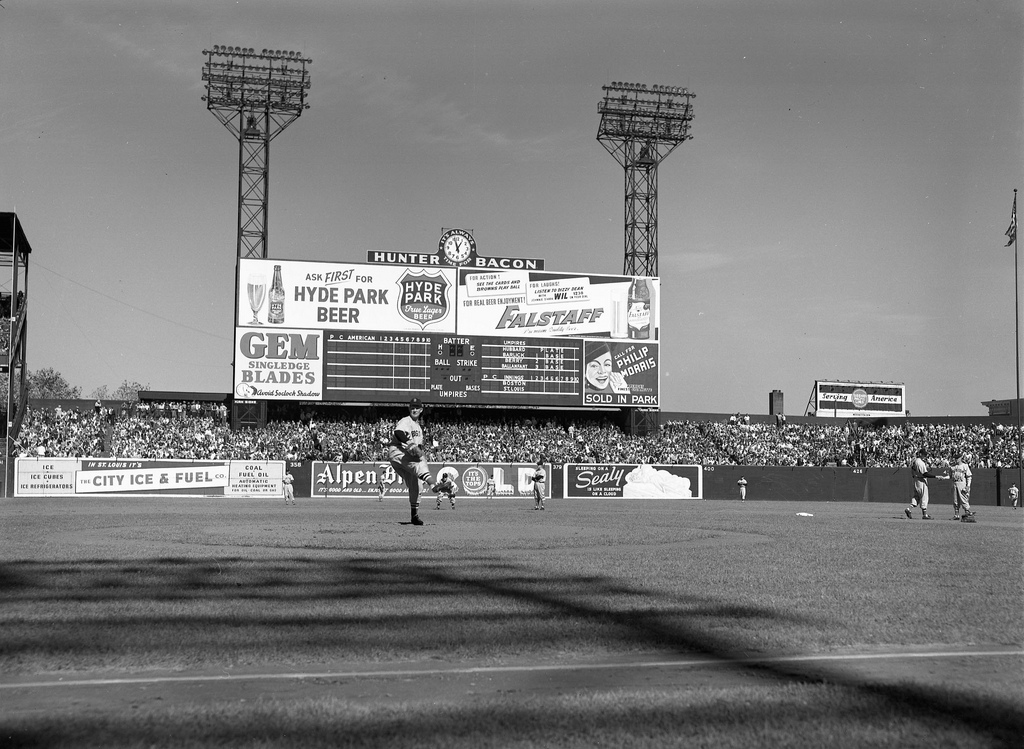
Sportsman's Park 1946 World Series

The Cardinals had long since passed the Browns as St. Louis' premier team, and chafed at having the Browns as landlords. At least as early as the 1940s, the Cardinals had sought to build their own park. Longtime owner Sam Breadon had set aside $3 million to build a new park. However, he was unable to find any land to do so, and World War II put those plans on hold. By 1947, Breadon faced the prospect of having to pay a heavy tax bill on his stadium fund. Tax lawyer Fred Saigh convinced Breadon to sell him the team, arguing this would save the Cardinals from this stiff tax burden.

When this tax dodge came to light in 1953 following an IRS audit, Saigh was subsequently charged with tax evasion, and pleaded no contest. Facing certain banishment from baseball, he put the team up for sale. Ultimately, Anheuser-Busch bought the Cardinals with the specific goal of keeping them in St. Louis.

However, the Cardinals would have needed a new park in any event. Sportsman's Park had been built in its final form in 1909, and had not aged well. By 1953, even with the rent from the Cardinals, there was not nearly enough revenue to bring the stadium up to code, with city officials even threatening to have it condemned. With this in mind, soon after Anheuser-Busch bought the Cardinals, Browns owner Bill Veeck sold the park to the Cardinals, who heavily renovated the park and renamed it Busch Stadium, while Veeck relocated his team to Baltimore (rebranding it the Orioles).

By the late 1950s, however, the need for a new park could no longer be staved off. Sportsman's Park/Busch Stadium had almost no parking, and the neighborhood around it had gone to seed.

In 1958, Charles Farris, the city's head of development, proposed a new stadium downtown as the core of a plan to revive a 31-block area of the business district. The original design of the stadium called for a baseball-only format, but after the NFL's Chicago Cardinals moved to St. Louis at the end of the 1959 season, becoming known as the football Cardinals in St. Louis, the design was altered to accommodate football as well: the football Cardinals would share Sportsman's Park/Busch Stadium with the baseball Cardinals.

With support from the local Chamber of Commerce, the Civic Center Redevelopment Corporation was established in September 1959, and it was given power of eminent domain, which was used to condemn several areas that were rundown or had gone to seed years before, including the small Chinatown district, the Grand Theater (a historic opera house that had evolved into a burlesque strip club), and various flophouses and abandoned warehouses.

Groundbreaking occurred on May 25, 1964, and construction took just under two years. The plan also included parking garages, the Stouffer's Riverfront Inn, and office buildings. A few years later, it also became the new home of the Spanish Pavilion from the 1964 New York World's Fair.

The stadium opened on May 12, 1966, one month into the baseball season, as Civic Center Busch Memorial Stadium. However, the "Civic Center" part was rarely used, and most people called it simply Busch Memorial Stadium.

=== Subsequent years ===
The stadium's grass was replaced with AstroTurf in 1970. St. Louis' notoriously hot summers made it difficult to keep the grass alive, especially when the football Cardinals insisted on practicing on the field during the end of the baseball Cardinals' season. The Cardinals retained a full dirt infield for eight seasons. A removable, sectioned Astroturf surface covered the infield during football season. The infield was converted to sliding pits when the surface was replaced for the 1978 baseball season. With artificial turf, the playing conditions at Busch Stadium were among the hottest in baseball, with temperatures well above the local official readings.

Anheuser-Busch (who owned the baseball Cardinals at the time) bought the stadium in 1981 for $53 million and removed the "Memorial" from the stadium's name, becoming simply Busch Stadium; the price included the parking garages.

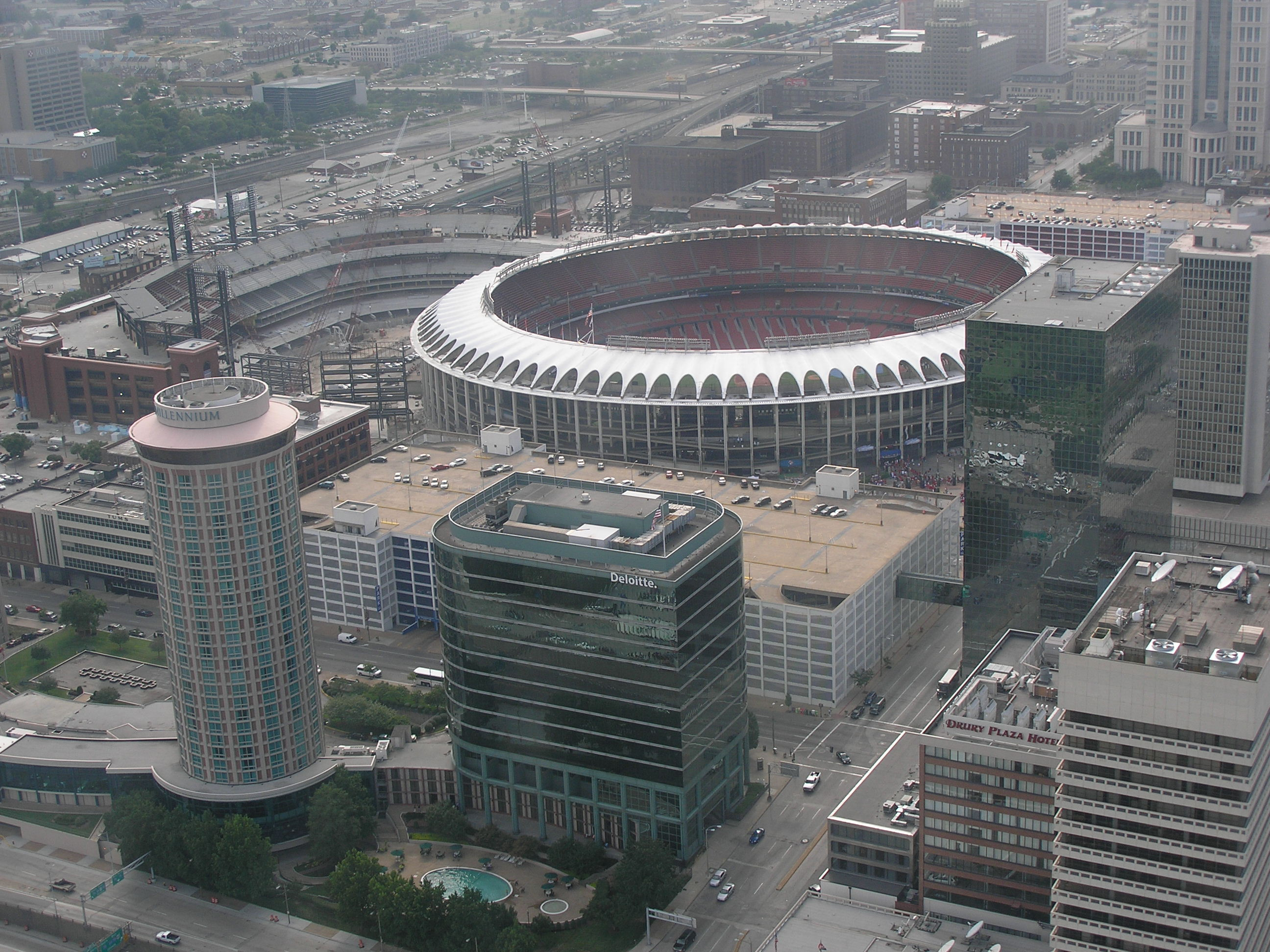
The new and old Busch Stadiums in August 2005

Over the years, the grounds became home to bronze statues of Stan Musial, Enos Slaughter, Dizzy Dean, Rogers Hornsby, Red Schoendienst, Lou Brock, Bob Gibson, James "Cool Papa" Bell, George Sisler, Jack Buck, and Ozzie Smith.

Following Busch's last 1995 event—the Rams' October 22 game before the opening of the Dome at America's Center—the Cardinals retrofitted it into a baseball-only stadium. A large section of the upper deck outfield seats was closed, replaced with a hand-operated scoreboard and flags commemorating the Cardinals' retired numbers and World Series championships. The stadium's original natural grass field was restored, and the outfield walls were re-painted green from their original blue.

=== Postseason ===
The Cardinals Won a total of two World Series championships in Busch Memorial Stadium in the years 1967 and 1982. In the 1967 World Series, the Cardinals won in a total of 7 games against the American League team the Boston Red Sox. In 1982, the Cardinals won 4 out of 7 games against the Milwaukee Brewers to win their 9th World Series title. The Cardinals started the series down 3-1, but, came back in 7 games. In the 1985 National League Championship Series, Cardinals Hall of fame Shortstop, Ozzie Smith came up to bat with three runners on base, and hit his first left handed home-run of his career, into right field. Then, the Legendary Cardinals announcer, Jack Buck, said his Iconic line "Go Crazy Folks, Go Crazy!". It won the game 3-2 for the Cardinals, helping them to defeat the Los Angeles Dodgers in the NLCS, which subsequently caused them to make it to the World Series, where they lost to the Kansas City Royals.

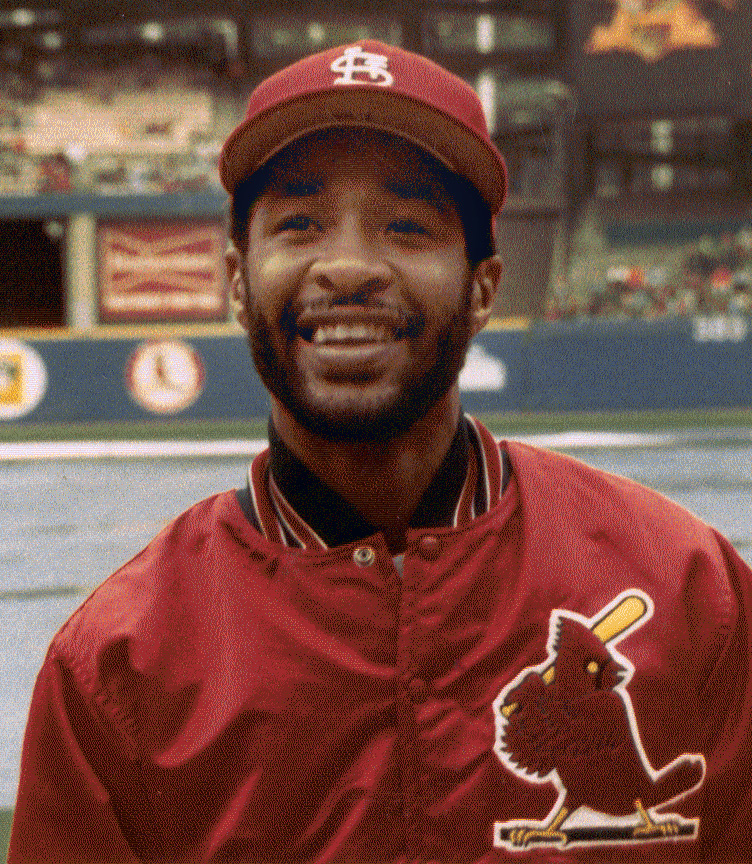
Ozzie Smith, 1983

=== Demolition ===
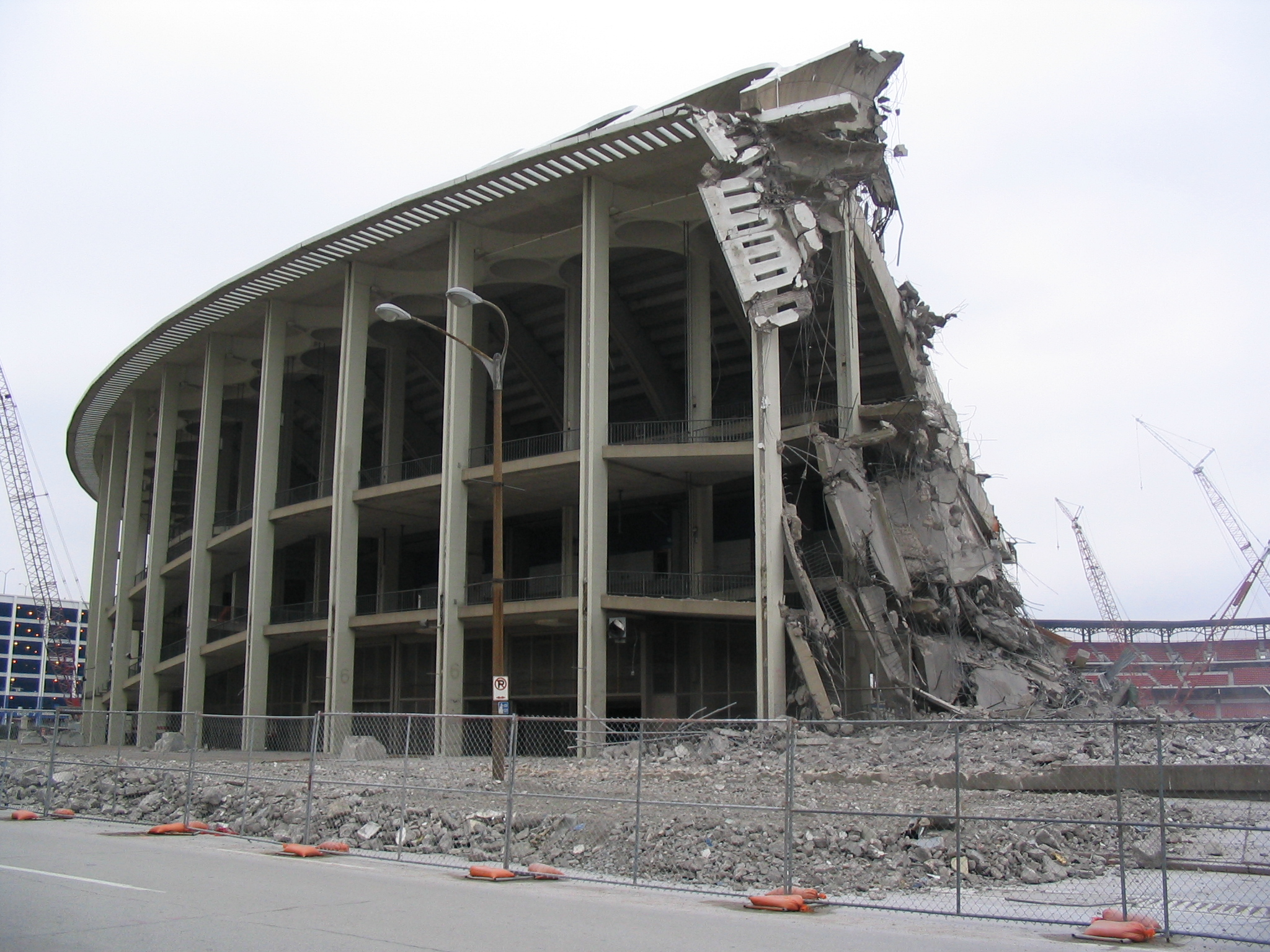
Busch Stadium II demolition in December 2005

Busch Memorial Stadium was originally slated to be imploded, like most modern-day stadium demolitions, to be able to finish construction on the new stadium in time for the 2006 season. Due to fear of damaging the nearby Stadium MetroLink station, it was decided to tear down the stadium with a wrecking ball, piece-by-piece, over the course of a few weeks.

Demolition of the stadium began at 3:07 p.m. CST on November 7 and was completed shortly after midnight on December 8, 2005.

Part of the footprint of the old stadium is occupied by the outfield of the new stadium. The Cardinals had planned to build Ballpark Village on the site of the stadium ($320 million for the first phase). It was to consist of boutiques and restaurants, condominium apartments anchored by the new headquarters of Centene Corporation—all to be built in time for the All-Star Game in 2009.

None of the construction had occurred until groundbreaking ceremonies on February 8, 2013, and locals derisively referred to its rain-soaked unfinished status before that date as "Lake DeWitt"—after Cardinal President William DeWitt, Jr. In March 2009, the Cardinals announced the site would be used for a softball field and parking during the game.

== Uses ==
=== Baseball ===
In its opening year, Busch Stadium hosted the All-Star Game, a 2–1 National League victory in 10 innings, mostly remembered for the humidity and 105 °F (41 °C) temperatures. The stadium hosted World Series games in six different seasons: 1967, 1968, 1982, 1985, 1987, and 2004. The Cardinals won the World Series in 1967 and 1982 while playing in the stadium (the seventh game of the 1982 Series was won at Busch). The 1968 and 2004 World Series were clinched in Busch Stadium by visitors: the Detroit Tigers in the seventh game and the Boston Red Sox in a four-game sweep, respectively.

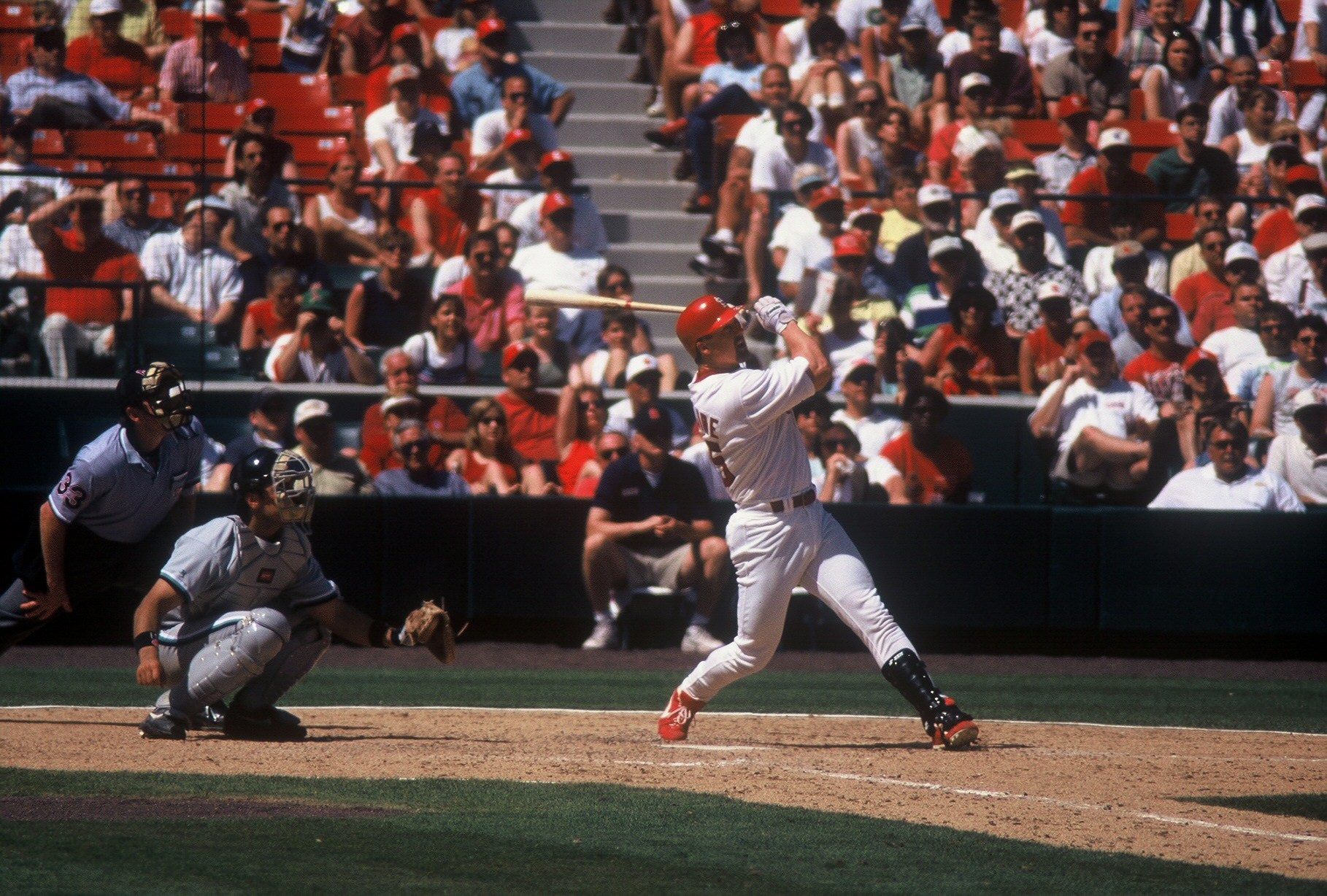
Mark McGwire bats in a 1998 home game.

The stadium was also the site of Mark McGwire's historic 62nd home run of the 1998 season that broke Roger Maris' single-season record, and also of McGwire's 70th of that season, for a record which lasted until Barry Bonds surpassed it in 2001. The dimensions in the center and the power alleys had been altered from time to time over the years. Initially, the park was very favorable to pitchers, with spacious outfield dimensions. Consequently, its design (as well as the Astroturf surface) was favorable to the Cardinals' style of play for most of the time from the 1960s through the 1990s, which emphasized good baserunning and extra-base hits. Later changes attempted to make the outfield better balanced between pitching and power hitting.

Before the 1996 season, the stadium was retrofitted to become a baseball-only stadium. Part of the top deck in center field was permanently closed, and in 1997, flags were put in place to honor the team's retired numbers and pennants. Even before then, the stadium had come under less scorn from baseball purists than other cookie-cutter stadiums built during the same era, partly because the "crown of arches" gave it a more traditional look than its cousins and partially because it was alone amongst cookie-cutters in having field-level outfield seating.

The baseball diamond was oriented southeast by east (home to center field); the new stadium is aligned east-northeast, the recommended orientation by MLB.

=== Football ===
Busch Stadium was also the home of the St. Louis Cardinals of the National Football League for 22 seasons, from 1966 through 1987.

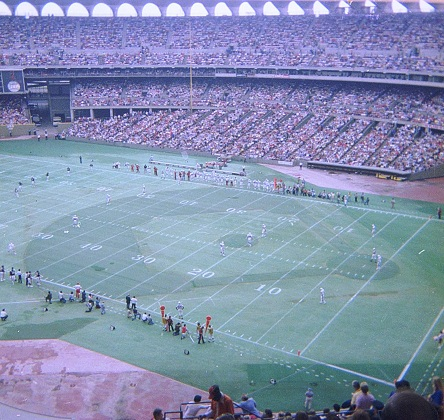
Chicago Bears at St. Louis Football Cardinals on Sep 25, 1977

The stadium was one of, and later the smallest, facilities in the NFL: while the NFL Cardinals played there, it seated 54,692 people, barely more than the NFL's minimum capacity of 50,000 (mandated in 1970). Various efforts were made to get a new larger stadium or expansion of Busch Stadium, but after these failed, Cardinals owner Bill Bidwill relocated the team to Phoenix, Arizona after the 1987 season.

The NFL Cardinals never hosted a playoff game during their 28 seasons in St. Louis, while the "Gridbirds" made only three playoff appearances during that stretch, losing on the road against the Minnesota Vikings in 1974, Los Angeles Rams in 1975, and Green Bay Packers in 1982. Despite this lack of success, they won the third place Playoff Bowl after the 1964 season, upsetting Vince Lombardi's Packers 31–24 at the Orange Bowl in Miami.

Busch Stadium was also briefly the home of the St. Louis Rams, who had relocated from Anaheim Stadium in Anaheim, California. Due to completion of their new home stadium, the new and nearby Trans World Dome (later renamed the Dome at America's Center) being delayed, the Rams played the first half of the 1995 season at Busch Stadium: for these four home games, Busch Stadium seated 60,000 people.

The Rams played their last game at Busch Stadium on October 22, while the new indoor venue hosted its first NFL game on November 12, 1995.

Between the Cardinals' 1987 departure and the Rams' 1995 arrival, the stadium hosted two NFL pre-season games: one between the Seattle Seahawks and the New England Patriots in 1989, and one between the New York Jets and the Kansas City Chiefs in 1991.

=== Soccer ===
The St. Louis Stars, a professional soccer team, played at Busch Stadium for several years in the 1960s and 1970s. They were initially a member of the National Professional Soccer League for one season in 1967 and moved to the North American Soccer League for their remaining seasons, which they split between Busch Stadium and Francis Field. The team set their record attendance of 32,605 against the New York Cosmos in 1977. The Stars were relocated to Southern California after the 1977 season after being unable to sign a new lease at Busch Stadium.

The stadium also hosted international soccer. It served as the temporary home venue for Trinidad and Tobago in a 1985 CONCACAF Championship match against the United States, who won 2–1 in front of 15,823 fans. The match was part of regional qualifiers for the 1986 FIFA World Cup.

The annual Bronze Boot Game between the Saint Louis Billikens and the SIU Edwardsville Cougars was played at Busch Stadium from 1972 until 1985. The matchup saw record size crowds, including the second highest attendance for a regular season college soccer match: 22,512 on October 30, 1980.

=== Concerts ===
Acts that performed at Busch Stadium include:

- The Beatles, on August 21, 1966, during their final North American tour.
- Jeff Beck, Ted Nugent, Jefferson Starship and Fleetwood Mac, as part of "Super Jam 76"
- The Who, on August 11, 1989
- The Rolling Stones, on September 17, 1989, during their Steel Wheels Tour
- New Kids on the Block on August 26, 1990, during The Magic Summer Tour
- U2 on September 20, 1992, during their Zoo TV Tour
- Paul McCartney on April 29, 1993, during The New World Tour
- Elton John and Billy Joel on August 9, 1994, during their first Face to Face Tour

== Seating capacity ==
Baseball
Years	Capacity
1966	49,275
1967–1970	49,450
1971–1978	50,126
1979–1986	50,222
1987	53,138
1988–1989	54,224
1990	54,727
1991	56,227
1992–1994	56,627
1995	57,078
1996	57,673
1997–2000	49,676
2001–2003	50,354
2004–2005	50,345

Football
Years	Capacity
1966–1969	49,818
1970–1971	50,492
1972–1985	51,392
1986–1994	54,692

Years	Capacity
1995	60,000

== See also ==
- Soccer in St. Louis

Preceded by Busch Stadium (I)	Home of the St. Louis Cardinals (NL); 1966–2005	Succeeded by Busch Stadium (III)
Preceded by Busch Stadium (I)	Home of the St. Louis Cardinals (NFL); 1966–1987	Succeeded by Sun Devil Stadium
Preceded by Anaheim Stadium	Home of the St. Louis Rams; September 10, 1995 – October 22, 1995	Succeeded by Trans World Dome
Preceded by Metropolitan Stadium	Host of the All-Star Game; 1966	Succeeded by Anaheim Stadium
Preceded by Miami Orange Bowl	Host of the College Cup; 1974	Succeeded by Ralph Korte Stadium
