= History of Chinese Americans in St. Louis =

The history of Chinese Americans in St. Louis began in 1857, with the arrival of 24-year-old Alla Lee in St. Louis, Missouri; it continues through the present day.

== History ==
A native of Ningbo, China, Alla Lee socialized with the Irish American community and married an Irish woman. He sold coffee and tea in a shop on North Tenth Street.

Around 1867, several hundred Chinese moved from New York and San Francisco to find work in factories and mines in and around St. Louis. The community they settled, Hop Alley, became St. Louis' Chinatown.

In the late 19th century and the early 20th century, the ethnic Chinese population was less than 0.1% of the city's population—but they provided 60% of the city's laundry services. At the turn of the century, there were 300 Chinese in St. Louis.

The size of the population had not much changed by 1960, when 102 Chinese lived in the city's suburbs, making up 30% of the Greater St. Louis Chinese. The move to the Missouri suburbs was accelerated in 1966, when Chinatown was demolished to make room for a parking lot for Busch Stadium. By 1970, 461 lived in the suburbs, making up 80% of the area population.

In 1980 the number increased to 3,873, making up 78% of the area population. In 1990, the number increased to 3,873, making up 83% of the area total.

The 2000 U.S. census said that there were 9,120 people of Chinese descent in Greater St. Louis.

In 2004, unofficial estimates ranged from 15,000 to 20,000, according to Huping Ling, author of Chinese St. Louis: From Enclave to Cultural Community. She said that 1% of the population of suburban St. Louis was ethnic Chinese and that the "great majority" of the ethnic Chinese in the area lived in the suburbs, particularly those west and south of St. Louis.

== Institutions ==
Chinese Americans founded Chinese-language schools and Chinese churches and community organizations. As of 2004, there were more than 40 Chinese community organizations in the area. Organization of Chinese Americans has an area chapter, OCA St. Louis, founded in 1973. Other organizations include the St. Louis Overseas Chinese Educational Activity Center, also called the Chinese Cultural Center (Note: traditional Chinese: 聖路易斯中華文化中心; simplified Chinese: 圣路易斯中华文化中心; pinyin: Shènglùyìsī Zhōnghuá Wénhuà Zhōngxīn), the St. Louis Taiwanese Association, the Chinese Liberty Assembly, and the St. Louis Chinese Jaycees.

== Cuisine ==
The destruction of Hop Alley closed many restaurants, some of which reopened elsewhere in the area.

As of 2004, the St. Louis area had more than 300 Chinese restaurants.

As of 2012, the city retained a number of chop suey restaurants, largely in low-income neighborhoods and African-American communities in the northern part of the city. 22 used the words "chop suey" in their names. Such restaurants had been popular in many parts of the country from the early 20th century, but had declined in the West Coast and the East Coast with new Chinese immigration and with more diverse types of food available. But the cuisine retained prominence in the American Midwest, where there was less Chinese immigration.

== Education ==
St. Louis Modern Chinese School students perform Chinese Kung Fu at the University of Missouri–St. Louis in December 2005.

As of 2016, there were four Chinese-language schools in the St. Louis area:

- St. Louis Modern Chinese School in Richmond Heights was established in 1997 by the Mainland China-origin community with 40 students. By 2007, there were several hundred students.
- St. Louis Chinese Language School ( (Note: 聖路易中文學校; 圣路易中文学校; Shènglùyì Zhōngwén Xuéxiào) holds its classes at the St. Joseph Institute for the Deaf school in Chesterfield.
- St. Louis Chinese Academy (Note: 聖路易中華語文學校; 圣路易中华语文学校; Shènglùyì Zhōnghuá Yǔwén Xuéxiào) holds its classes at the St. Louis Community College at Meramec Campus in Kirkwood.
- St. Louis Language Immersion School operates a Chinese School at 3740 Marine Avenue in the city of St. Louis. Education at the school is free for area students.

As well, St. Louis University High School has Chinese-language programs and is home to a Confucius classroom that is part of Webster University's Confucius Institute.

== Media ==
As of 2004, there were two weekly Chinese language newspapers:

- St. Louis Chinese American News (Note: 聖路易時報; 圣路易时报; Shènglùyì Shíbào), headquartered in Overland,
- St. Louis Chinese Journal (Note: 聖路易新聞; 圣路易新闻; Shènglùyì Xīnwén), headquartered in University City.

== Religion ==
As of 2004, there were around 12 Chinese religious institutions.

Christian churches include the Taiwanese Presbyterian Church of Greater St. Louis (TPCSTL, (Note: 聖路易臺灣基督長老教會; 圣路易台湾基督长老教会; Shèng Lùyì Táiwān Jīdū Zhǎnglǎo Jiàohuì) in Ballwin, the St. Louis Chinese Christian Church (SLCCC; (Note: 聖路易華人基督教會; 圣路易华人基督教会; Shèng Lùyì Huárén Jīdūjiàohuì) in Chesterfield, the St. Louis Chinese Gospel Church (Note: 聖路易中華福音教會; 圣路易中华福音教会; Shèng Lùyì Zhōnghuá Fúyīn Jiàohuì) in Manchester, the Light of Christ Lutheran Chinese Mission (Note: 基督之光路德會華人教會; 基督之光路德会华人教会; Jīdū zhī Guāng Lùdéhuì Huárén Jiàohuì) in Olivette, The St. Louis Chinese Baptist Church (STLCBC; (Note: 聖路易華人浸信會; 圣路易华人浸信会; Shèng Lùyì Huárén Jìnxìnhuì) in St. Peters, the Lutheran Asian Ministry in St. Louis, and the St. Louis Tabernacle of Joy.

The other religious institutions are the St. Louis Amitabha Buddhist Learning Center, the St. Louis Tzu-Chi Foundation, the St. Louis International Buddhist Association, the Mid-America Buddhist Association (MABA) in Augusta, and the St. Louis Falun Dafa. The Fo Guang Shan St. Louis Buddhist Center (FGS) (Note: 佛光山聖路易禪淨中心; 佛光山圣路易禅净中心; Fó Guāngshān Shèng Lùyì Chánjìng Zhōngxīn) is in Bridgeton.

== Recreation ==
The Chinese Culture Days are annually held at the Missouri Botanical Gardens. The Chinese community organizations sponsor this event, cultural gatherings, and other Chinese-American events.

== Notable residents ==
- Steven Chu, physicist
- Huping Ling, professor at Truman State University
- Qiu Xiaolong, novelist
