= Chinatown, St. Louis =

Neighborhood of St. Louis in Missouri, US

St. Louis Chinatown
- Neighborhood of St. Louis
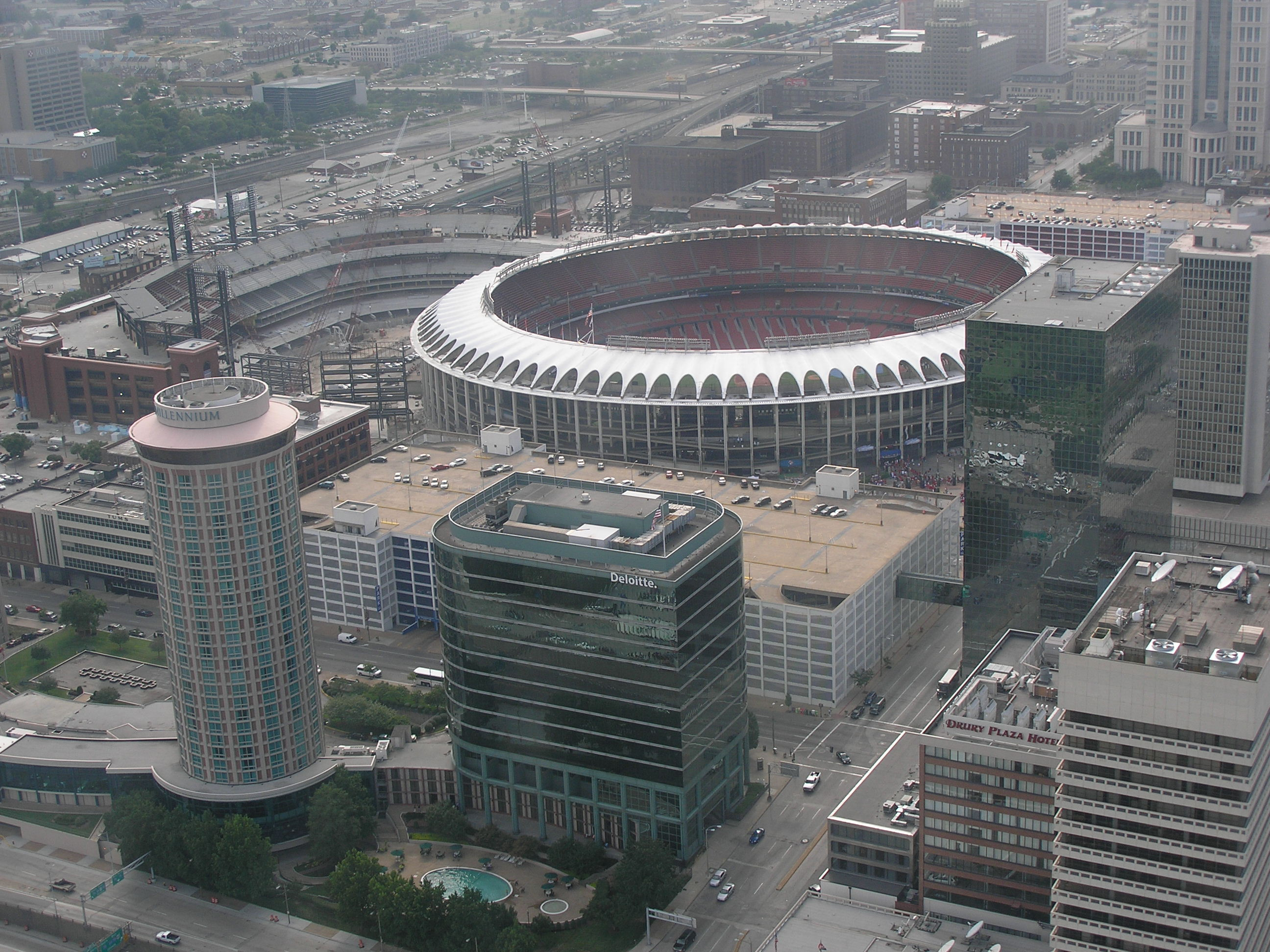
- New and old Busch Stadiums, at the location of the old Chinatown
- Interactive map of St. Louis Chinatown
- Coordinates: 38°37′38″N 90°11′52″W
- Country: United States
- State: Missouri
- City: St. Louis
- Area code: Area code 314

Chinatown in St. Louis, Missouri, was a Chinatown near Downtown St. Louis that existed from 1869 until its demolition for Busch Memorial Stadium in 1966. Also called Hop Alley, it was bounded by Seventh, Tenth, Walnut and Chestnut streets.

== History ==
The first Chinese immigrant to St. Louis was Alla Lee, born in Ningbo near Shanghai, who arrived in the city in 1857. Lee remained the only Chinese immigrant until 1869, when a group of about 250 immigrants (mostly men) arrived seeking factory work. In January 1870, another group of Chinese immigrants arrived, including some women. By 1900, the immigrant population of St. Louis Chinatown had settled at between 300 and 400. Chinatown established itself as the home to Chinese hand laundries, which in turn represented more than half of the city's laundry facilities. Other businesses included groceries, restaurants, tea shops, barber shops, and opium dens. Between 1958 and the mid-1960s, Chinatown was condemned and demolished for urban renewal and to make space for Busch Memorial Stadium.

== See also ==
- History of Chinese Americans in St. Louis
- History of St. Louis, Missouri
- List of Chinatowns in the United States
- Organization of Chinese Americans
