= Emmanuel Nnadozie =

Economist and academic

Emmanuel Nnadozie is an educator, economist, professor of economics, entrepreneur and author. His scholarly works are in the area of economics and development in Africa and the world. This includes African Economic Development. He has also contributed to research journals such as the "Journal of African Finance and Economic Development", Journal of College Student Development. He has been a research fellow at the University of Oxford and a visiting professor at the University of Carolina - Charlotte.

He is currently Executive Secretary of the African Capacity Building Foundation (ACBF). He was previously Chief Economist and director of the Economic Development and NEPAD Division of the United Nations Economic Commission for Africa (ECA). As such, he edits the annual publication African Economic Outlook.

== United Nations Economic Commission for Africa (ECA) ==
He led and managed the development agenda of ECA and served as the spokesperson for the ECA on economic development in Africa. He served as Adviser to the Executive Secretary of ECA on Africa's Development, representing the Commission intergovernmental and continental bodies and meetings and advises African Governments on development issues. He coordinated UN System-wide Support to Africa's Development and supported the UN relations with the African Union (AU) Commission, the NEPAD Agency, the APRM Secretariat, the RECs and other regional and sub-regional organizations.

He formulated and implemented substantive work and programmes in the areas of: macroeconomic analysis, growth and employment, development finance, investment, industrial development, Millennium Development Goals (MDGs), poverty eradication, Least Developed Countries (LDCs) and coordination of UN system support to the African Union and its NEPAD programme. He oversaw and led the preparation of such ECA flagship outputs and reports as the Economic Report on Africa (ERA), African MDGs and Least Developed Countries (LDCs) Reports and the Report on Financing for Development and the Regional Coordination Mechanism of UN agency organizations (RCM-Africa).

== Academic career ==
From 1989 to 2004, Nnadozie taught economics at Truman State University in Kirksville, Missouri. While at Truman, he also held a fellowship at University of Oxford and a visiting professorship at University of North Carolina. In 1992 he obtained a federal grant to establish the university's McNair Scholars Program. He served as the director of the program until he left the university in 2004. Additionally, he was a co-founder and faculty advisor of the African Students Association at Truman.

== Works ==
- African Economic Development 2nd Edition - 2019
- African Economic Development - 2003
- African Culture & American Business in Africa: How to Strategically Manage Cultural Differences in African Business -1998
- Chad: A Nation in Search of Its Future (co-authored with Mario Azevedo), 1997
- Oil and Socioeconomic Crisis in Nigeria: A Regional Perspective to the Nigerian Disease and the Rural Sector - 1995
- Journal of African Finance and Economic Development - 2001 (co-authored Sa-Aadu; Diery Seck)
- Nigeria politics challenges Christian unity: Ecumenical response to Nigeria politics - 1992)
- Oil & Socioeconomic Crisis in Nigeria - 1980

== Affiliations and awards ==
=== Awards ===
- Outstanding Black Missourian award - for contributions towards Black education.

=== Affiliations ===
- Pi Delta Phi
- Phi Kappa Phi
- Omicron Delta Kappa
